= Morris County, New Jersey =

County in New Jersey, United States

- County
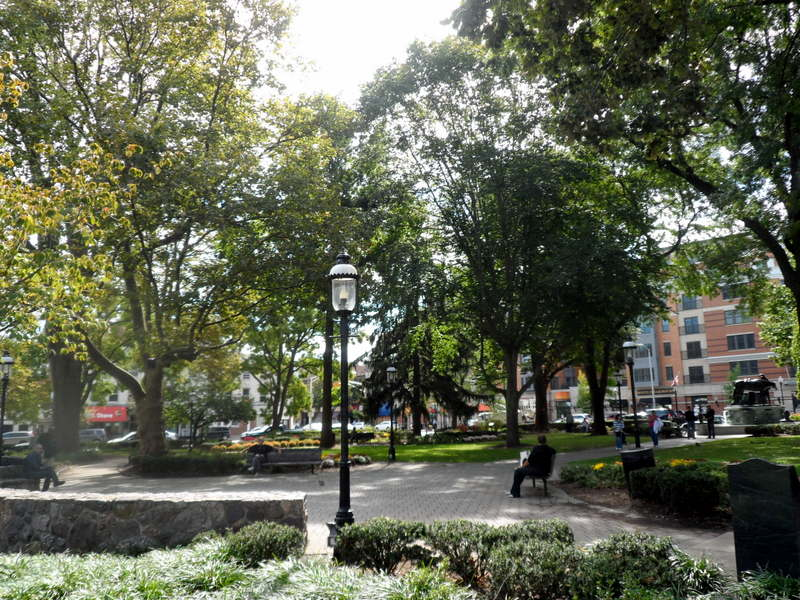
- The Morristown Green, a historic park, serves as a gathering place and a center of culture within Morristown, the county seat of Morris County.

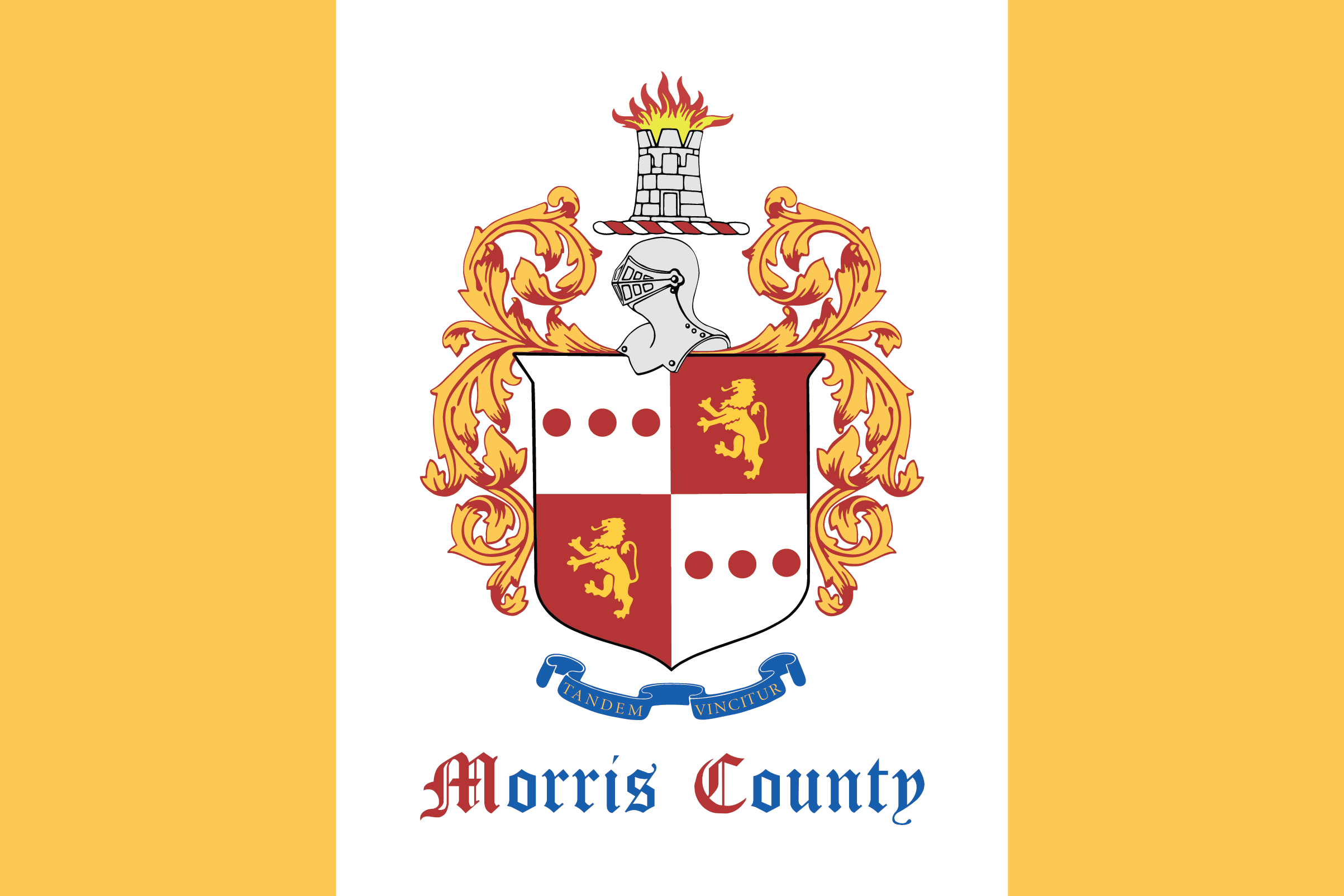
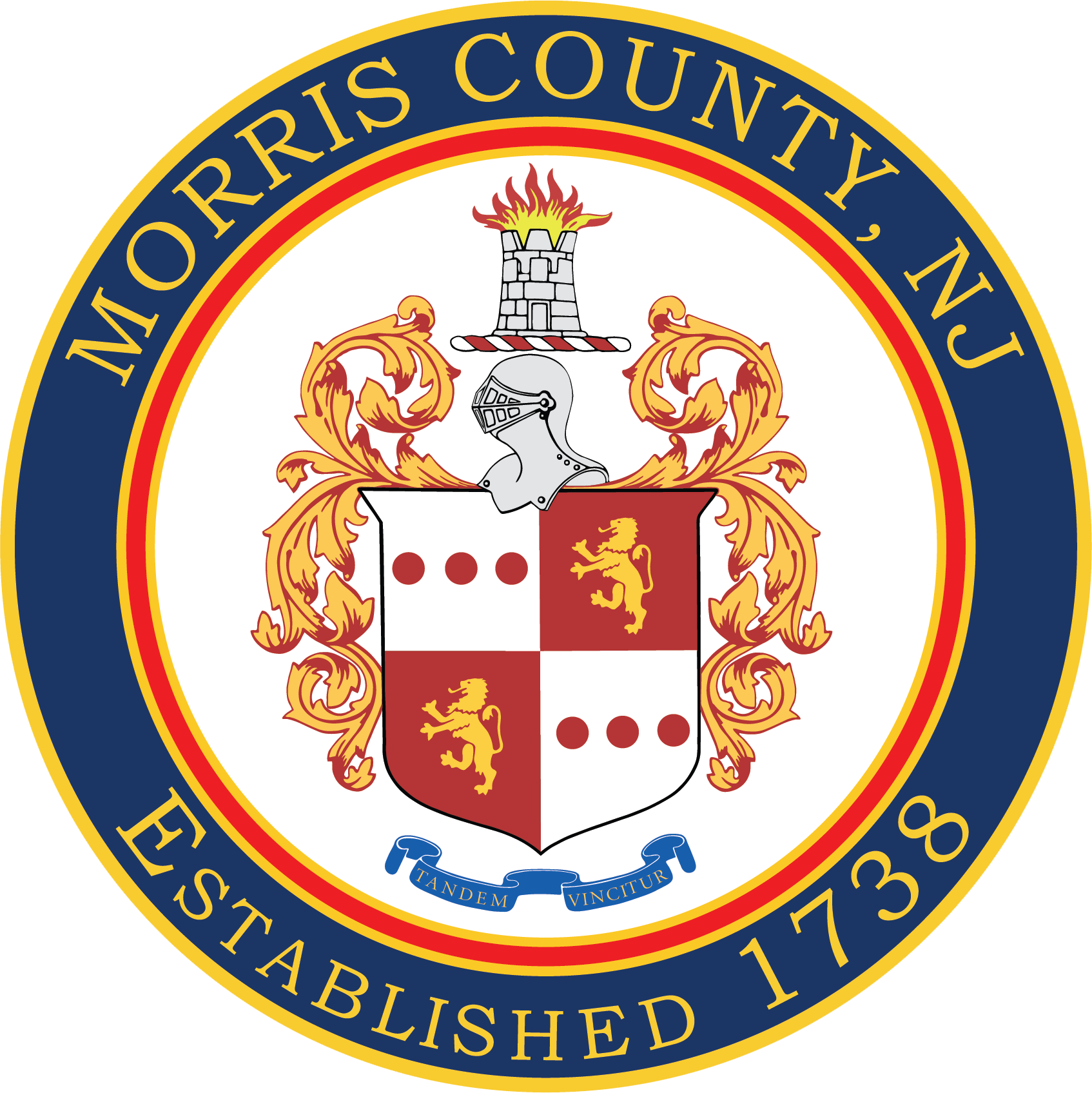
- Flag Seal

- Location within the U.S. state of New Jersey
- Interactive map of Morris County, New Jersey
- Coordinates: 40.87°N 74.55°W
- Country: United States
- State: New Jersey
- Founded: March 15, 1739
- Named for: Colonial governor Lewis Morris
- Seat: Morristown
- Largest township: Parsippany-Troy Hills (population); Rockaway Township (area)

Government
  - Director of the Board of Commissioners: Stephen Shaw (R, term ends December 31, 2026)

Area
  - Total: 481.52 sq mi (1,247.1 km^{2})
  - Land: 460.97 sq mi (1,193.9 km^{2})
  - Water: 20.55 sq mi (53.2 km^{2}) 4.3%

Population (2020)
  - Total: 509,285 ▲
  - Estimate (2025): 524,251
  - Density: 1,104.8/sq mi (426.57/km^{2})
- Time zone: UTC−5 (Eastern)
  - Summer (DST): UTC−4 (EDT)
- Congressional districts: 7th, 11th
- Website: morriscountynj.gov

Morris County is a county located in the U.S. state of New Jersey, about 30 mi (48 km) west of New York City. According to the 2020 census, the county was the state's tenth-most populous county, with a population of 509,285, its highest decennial count ever and an increase of 17,009 (+3.5%) from the 2010 census count of 492,276, which in turn reflected an increase of 22,064 (+4.7%) from the 470,212 counted in the 2000 census. The United States Census Bureau's Population Estimates Program estimated a 2025 population of 524,251, an increase of 14,966 (+2.9%) from the 2020 decennial census. Morris County is part of the New York metropolitan area and is divided into 39 municipalities, with many commuter towns but no large cities. Its county seat is Morristown, in the southeast. The most populous place was Parsippany-Troy Hills, with 56,162 residents at the time of the 2020 census, while Rockaway Township covered 45.55 square miles (118.0 km^{2}), the largest total area of any municipality. The county is part of the North Jersey region of the state.

In 2021, the county had a per capita personal income of $61,915, the highest in New Jersey and ranked 16th of 3,113 counties in the United States. Morris County, as of the 2020 Census, was the fourteenth-wealthiest county in the United States by median household income at $117,298 (second in New Jersey behind Hunterdon County at $117,858).

In 2017, Morris County was ranked second among the state's 21 counties in healthiness, according to an annual report by County Health Rankings and Roadmaps.

== History ==
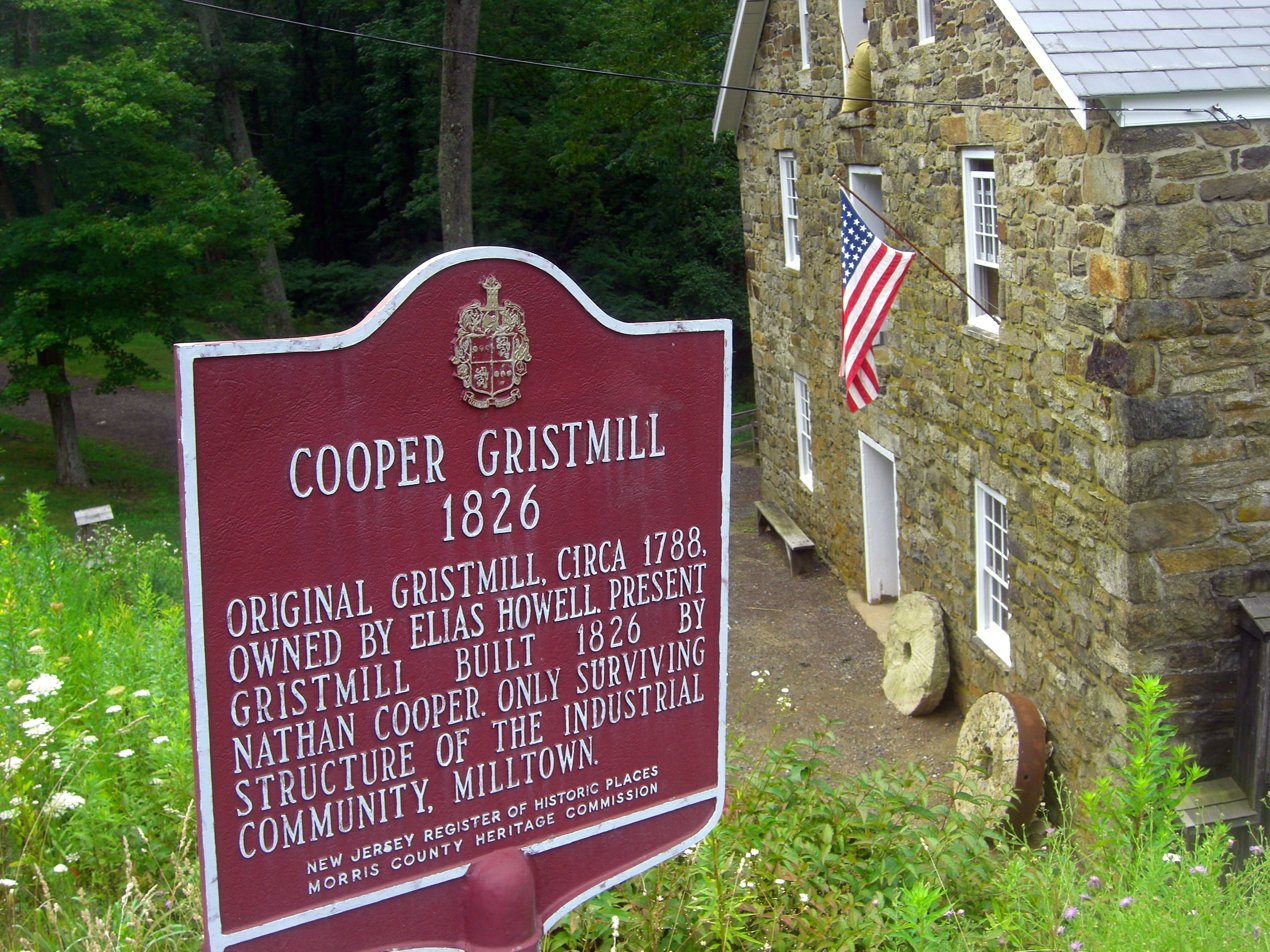
Nathan Cooper Gristmill in Chester Township

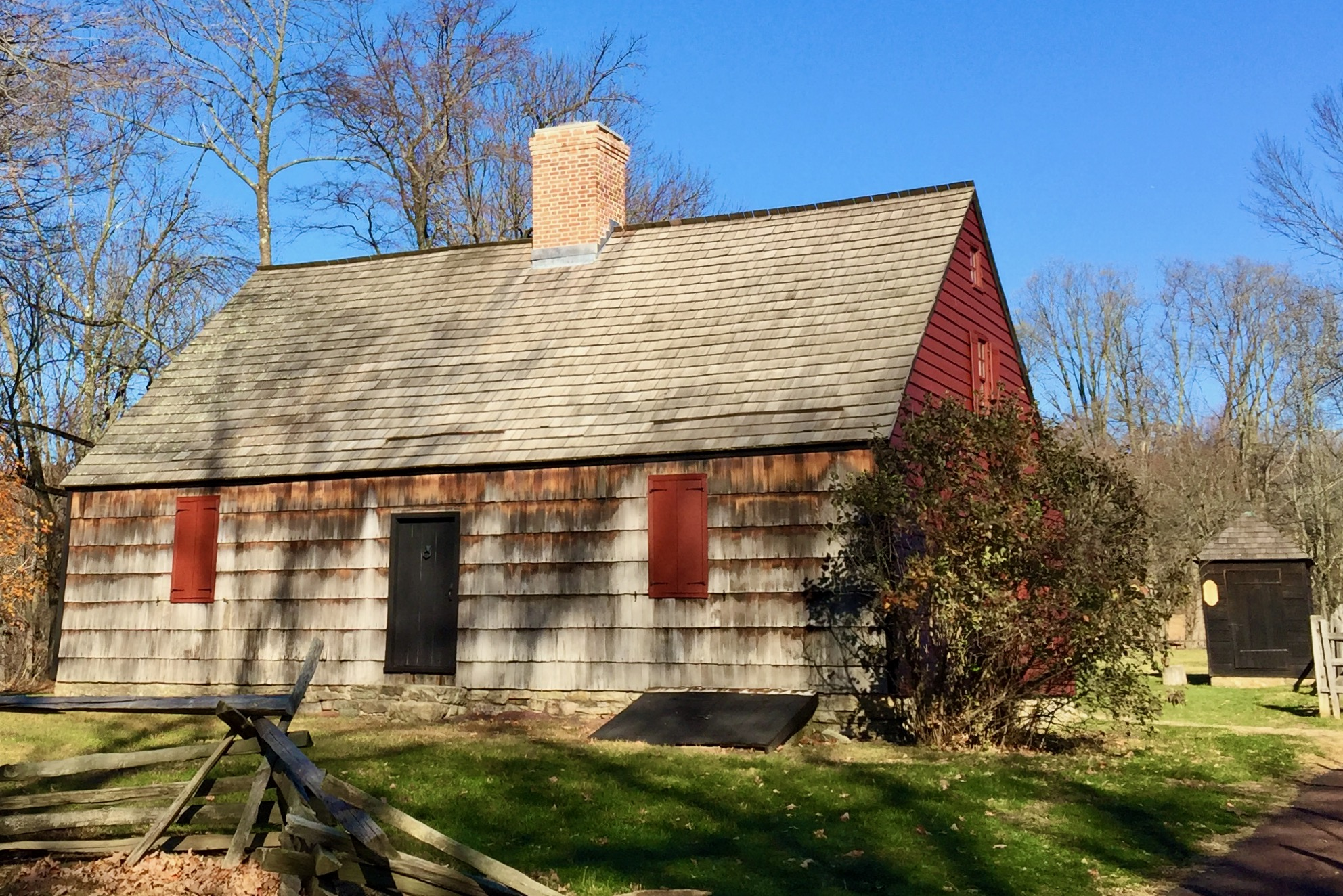
The Wick House at Jockey Hollow

=== Etymology ===
Morris County was named after Colonel Lewis Morris, governor of New Jersey in 1738–39, the year the county was named.

=== Paleo-Indians and Native Americans ===
The Wisconsin Glacier covered the northern section of Morris County from about 23,000 BC to 13,000 BC.

After the Wisconsin Glacier melted around 13,000 BC, Paleo-Indians settled the area from the south in search of big and small game as well as plants. The area was first tundra with grasses growing. Rabbits and fox moved into the area from the south.

Around the year 1000, the area of Morris County was inhabited by the Lenape Native Americans prior to the arrival of European settlers. They came from the Mississippi River area. They lived along the rivers, hunted game, and fished in addition to collecting plants and nuts.

=== Dutch and English colonization ===
Henry Hudson explored the Hudson River area in 1609, and later the Dutch did surveys of the area.

From 1611 to 1614, the Dutch established the colony of New Netherland, which claimed territory between the 40th and 45th parallel north, a zone which included northern New Jersey. Dutch forts were established along the Hudson River beginning in 1613. As the years went by, more forts were established to trade with Native Americans.

The Native Americans traded furs and food with the Dutch for various goods. In return the Dutch gave the Native Americans metal pots, knives, guns, axes, and blankets. Trading with the Native Americans occurred until 1643 when a series of wars broke out between the Dutch and Native Americans.

There were hostile relations between the Dutch and Native Americans between 1643 and 1660. This prevented colonization by the Dutch of the Morris County region which was technically included in their claimed "New Netherland".

On August 27, 1664, three English ships approached Fort Amsterdam and the fort was surrendered to the English. The English now controlled New Netherland and Morris County was now under control of the colony of New York. Relations with the Native Americans improved for a while.

There was a war with the Dutch ten years later. The Dutch re-took control of New Amsterdam but after a year returned it to the English. Relations with the Native Americans and English improved for a while.

European settlements began in the early 18th century while the area was known as Hunterdon County. Native Americans were still in the area at that time. Land was purchased from the Native Americans for various things such as blankets, shirts, rum, guns, knives, pots and gunpowder. European colonization began along the Atlantic coast moving inland.

The first European settlement in the area today known as Morris County occurred in Pompton Plains by the Dutch in 1695. From 1710 to 1730, various iron mines and forges were established. The first was in Whippany in 1710 and then in Succasunna in 1713.

By 1750, nearly all Native Americans had left New Jersey. This was due to land purchases from the Native Americans, diseases that the Native Americans contracted from Europeans, and due to starvation from the Little Ice Age, during which Native American corn crops failed and rivers froze, preventing fishing. Snow storms sent game into semi-hibernation or made them difficult to find. Nut crops such as oak, hickory, beech, walnut, chestnut and butternut failed some years due to late frosts in spring. Many of the Morris County Native Americans went to eastern Canada and others went to the Ohio Valley. The Walking Purchase in September 1737, prevented Native Americans from going to eastern Pennsylvania. At that time, European settlement grew swiftly as there was now land to be farmed and settled.

Morris County was originally part of Burlington County which had been established in 1694. It then became part of Hunterdon County, which separated from Burlington County in 1714.

Morris County was created on March 15, 1739 [O.S. 1738], from portions of Hunterdon County. The county was named for the Governor of the Province of New Jersey, Colonel Lewis Morris. In later years Sussex County (on June 8, 1753) and, after the revolution, Warren County (on November 20, 1824, from portions of Sussex County) were carved out of what had been the original area of Morris County under English rule.

The county was the site of the winter camp of the Continental Army after the Battles of Trenton and Princeton during the winter of 1777, as well as another winter camp at Jockey Hollow during an extremely cold winter of 1779–80.

In the 1880s, Dover was the center of iron ore mining with the 132 mines producing 700,000 tons of ore annually. The mines were mostly worked by Cornish miners, with the bulk of the population in Dover and Port Oram of Cornish extraction. At that time the Cornish had kept their customs and dialect, were deeply religious and predominantly Methodists.

== Geography and geology ==
According to the U.S. Census Bureau, as of the 2020 Census, the county had a total area of 481.52 square miles (1,247.1 km^{2}), of which 460.97 square miles (1,193.9 km^{2}) was land (95.7%) and 20.55 square miles (53.2 km^{2}) was water (4.3%).

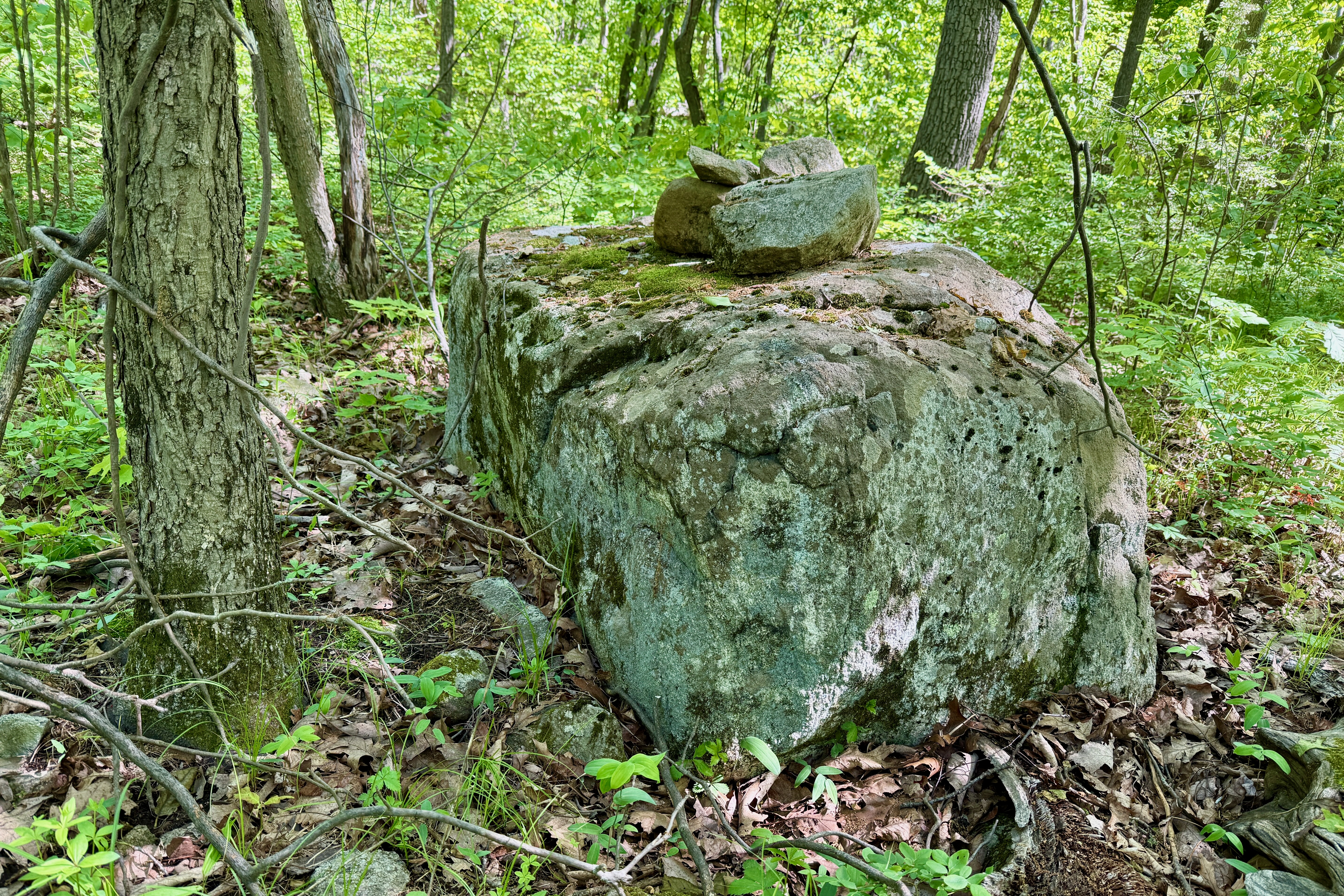
Highest point, in woods near sign on trail indicating highest point in county located in Jefferson Township.

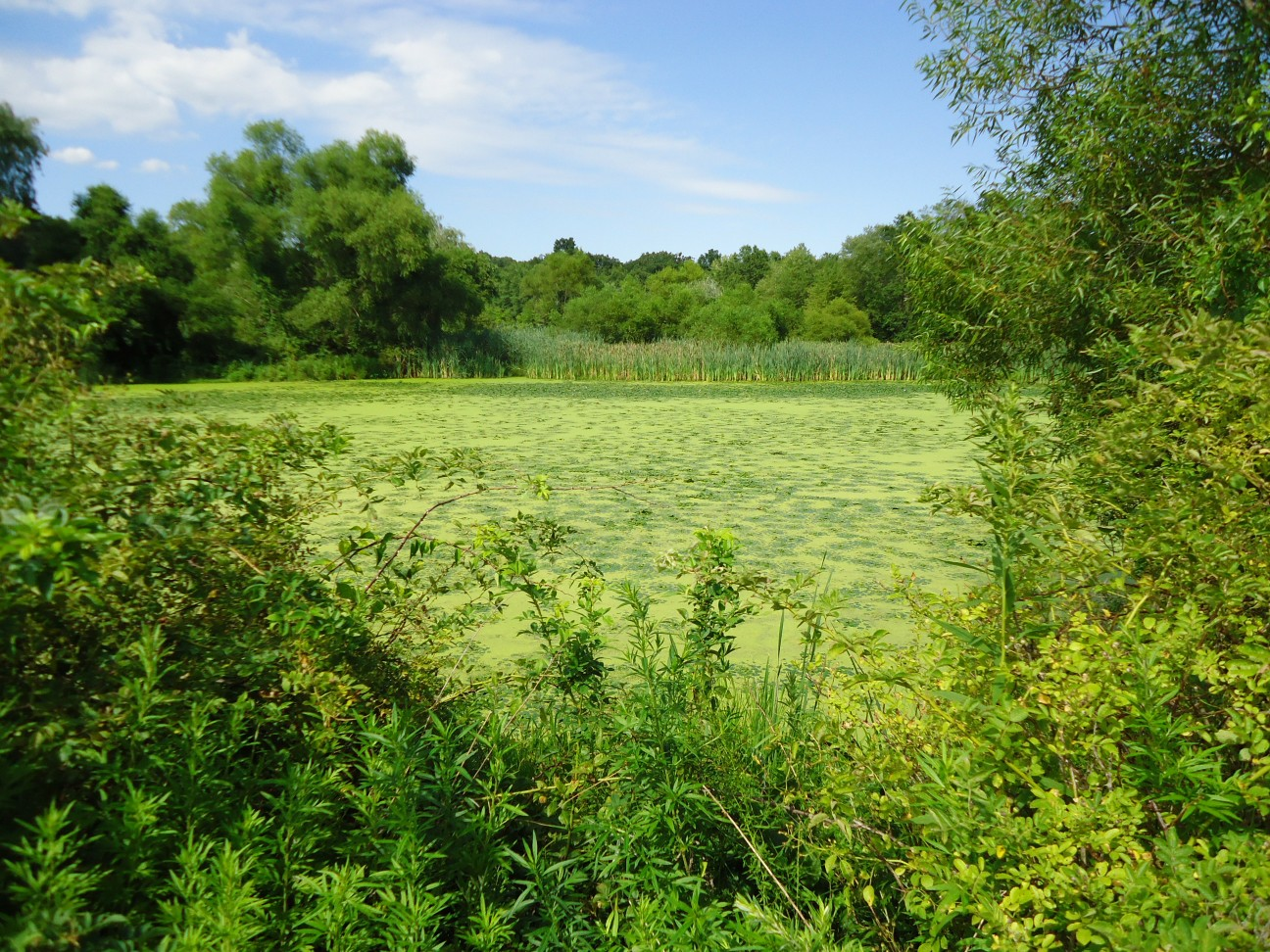
Loantaka Brook Reservation bikeway pond with algae located in Morris Township

The county rises in elevation and relief from east to west, with only the more developed eastern suburbs in the Passaic River valley being relatively level. The highest point is at 1,395 feet (425 m) above sea level on a mountain south of Pine Swamp in western Jefferson Township. The second-highest point is on a mountain just north of Riker Lake at 1,358 feet (414 m). The lowest point is about 160 feet (49 m) in elevation, at Two Bridges, the confluence of the Passaic and Pompton rivers.

The county is drained by several rivers. The Rockaway River drains 125 square miles (320 km^{2}), of the northern section of the county. The Whippany River drains 69 square miles (180 km^{2}) of the middle of the county. The South Branch of the Raritan River and the Black River drain the western area.

Most of the county's borders are rivers. The Pequannock River drains the northern boundary area. The Pompton River drains the eastern section. The Passaic River also drains the eastern border area. The western border is drained by the Musconetcong River. There are several large lakes in Morris County; among them are the state's largest lake, Lake Hopatcong, Budd Lake, Lake Parsippany, and the Boonton Reservoir, also known as the Jersey City Reservoir.

=== Climate ===
Morris has a humid continental climate (Dfa/Dfb) and the hardiness zones are 6a and 6b.

Climate data for Morristown
Month	Jan	Feb	Mar	Apr	May	Jun	Jul	Aug	Sep	Oct	Nov	Dec	Year
Mean daily maximum °F (°C)	38 (3)	41 (5)	50 (10)	61 (16)	71 (22)	80 (27)	85 (29)	83 (28)	75 (24)	65 (18)	54 (12)	43 (6)	62 (17)
Mean daily minimum °F (°C)	18 (−8)	19 (−7)	27 (−3)	36 (2)	46 (8)	54 (12)	59 (15)	58 (14)	51 (11)	39 (4)	32 (0)	23 (−5)	39 (4)
Average precipitation inches (mm)	4.50 (114)	3.00 (76)	4.41 (112)	4.64 (118)	5.09 (129)	4.40 (112)	5.29 (134)	4.37 (111)	5.33 (135)	4.17 (106)	4.37 (111)	4.10 (104)	53.67 (1,363)

=== Weather ===
Morristown, New Jersey

Climate chart (precipitation, max. and min. temperature)
J	F	M	A	M	J	J	A	S	O	N	D
4.5 38 18	3.1 41 19	4.4 50 27	4.6 61 36	5.1 71 46	4.4 80 54	5.3 85 59	4.4 83 58	5.3 75 51	4.2 65 39	4.4 54 32	4.1 43 23
- █ Average max. and min. temperatures in °F
- █ Precipitation totals in inches
- Source: The Weather Channel
Metric conversion
J	F	M	A	M	J	J	A	S	O	N	D
114 3 −8	79 5 −7	112 10 −3	118 16 2	129 22 8	112 27 12	134 29 15	111 28 14	135 24 11	106 18 4	111 12 0	104 6 −5
- █ Average max. and min. temperatures in °C
- █ Precipitation totals in mm

In recent years, average temperatures in the county seat of Morristown have ranged from a low of 18 to 23 °F (−8 to −5 °C) in January to a high of 83 to 85 °F (28 to 29 °C) in July, although a record low of −26 °F (−32 °C) was recorded in February 1934 and a record high of 104 °F (40 °C) was recorded in August 2001. Average monthly precipitation ranged from 3.12 inches (79 mm) in February to 5.33 inches (135 mm) in September.

=== Geology ===
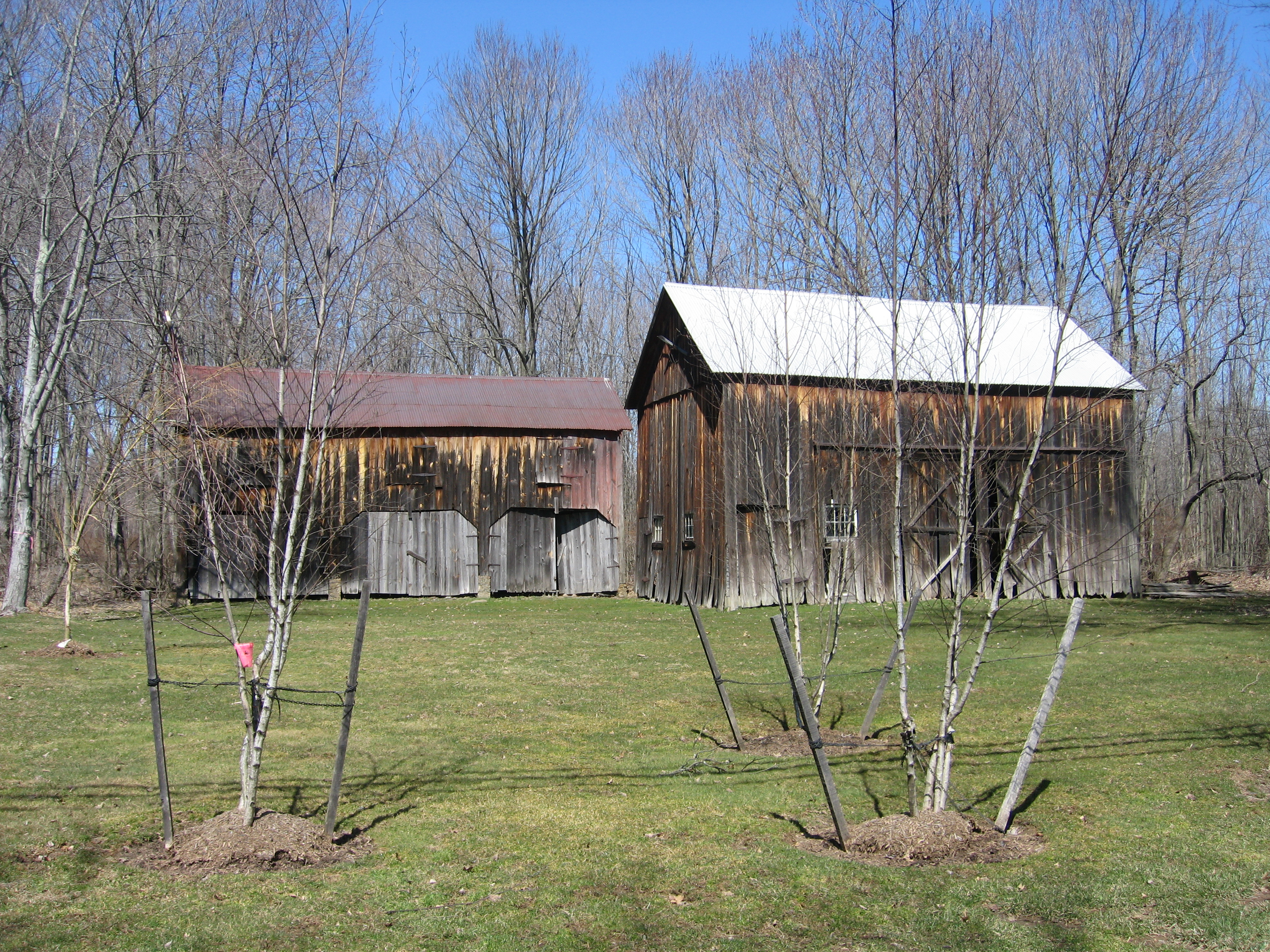
Barn located in the Great Swamp National Wildlife Refuge located in Harding Township

Around 500 million years ago, a chain of volcanic islands shaped like an arc collided with proto-North America. The islands rode over top of the North American plate. This created the highlands in western Morris County and the eastern section of Morris County.

Around 400 million years ago, a small continent long and narrow collided with proto-North America. This created folding and faulting, as compression occurred. Then around 350 million years ago, the African Plate collided with North America creating the folding and faulting in the Appalachians. But when the African plate pulled away from North America, an aborted rift valley was created. This half graben, starts east of Boonton and goes through the middle of Parsippany, south to Morristown, to the south end of Great Swamp. From Parsippany and the Boonton area the half graben goes east to the western side of Paterson, where there was another fault by the lava flows. East of the Ramapo Fault is where there is this aborted rift valley.

The Ramapo fault goes through the county on a northeast–southwest axis. The fault separates the Highlands from the Piedmont, also known as the Newark Basin. This is an active fault. The last major earthquake occurred in 1884, with a strength measured at 5.3 on the Richter scale.

Around 21,000 BCE., the Wisconsin Glacier covered about half of Morris County. The terminal moraine went from Hackettstown east to north of Budd Lake, east to Rockaway and Denville, then southeast to Morristown then south to the south end of Great Swamp. When the glacier melted around 13,000 B.C. the melt water created Glacial Lake Passaic. The lake extended from what is now Pompton Lakes through Parsippany south to the south end of Great Swamp. From Parsippany the lake went east to the lava flows of western Paterson. This lake was 30 miles (48 km) long and 10 miles (16 km) miles wide and the depth was about 200 feet (61 m). When the Wisconsin glacier covered Morris County, the ice sheet was about 300 metres (980 ft) deep. Due to debris from the glacier, the lake was unable to drain through the Watchung Mountains near Short Hills. Instead, it drained through Moggy Hollow at the southwestern end of the lake. But when the glacier melted and receded to the New York State line, the lake drained though the Little Falls area, as this was lower in elevation than Moggy Hollow. And thus the Passaic River formed.

The swamps of the Great Piece Meadows, Hatfield Swamp, Troy Meadows, Lee Meadows and Great Swamp were all under the Lake Passaic until it drained, and then these areas were created.

== Demographics ==
Historical population
Census	Pop.	Note	%±
1790	16,216		—
1800	17,750		9.5%
1810	21,828		23.0%
1820	21,368		−2.1%
1830	23,666		10.8%
1840	25,844		9.2%
1850	30,158		16.7%
1860	34,677		15.0%
1870	43,137		24.4%
1880	50,861		17.9%
1890	54,101		6.4%
1900	65,156		20.4%
1910	74,704		14.7%
1920	82,694		10.7%
1930	110,445		33.6%
1940	125,732		13.8%
1950	164,371		30.7%
1960	261,620		59.2%
1970	383,454		46.6%
1980	407,630		6.3%
1990	421,353		3.4%
2000	470,212		11.6%
2010	492,276		4.7%
2020	509,285		3.5%
2025 (est.)	524,251		2.9%
Historical sources: 1790–1990; 1970–2010 2000; 2010 2000–2010; 2010 2020

=== 2020 census ===
As of the 2020 census, the county had 509,285 people, 188,496 households, and 129,707 families. The population density was 1,106.7 inhabitants per square mile (427.3/km^{2}). There were 197,722 housing units at an average density of 429.67 per square mile (165.9/km^{2}).

The racial makeup of the county was 69.7% White, 3.3% Black or African American, 0.3% American Indian and Alaska Native, 11.4% Asian, <0.1% Native Hawaiian and Pacific Islander, 6.1% from some other race, and 9.2% from two or more races. Hispanic or Latino residents of any race comprised 15.1% of the population.

The median age was 42.6 years. 20.8% of residents were under the age of 18 and 17.6% were 65 years of age or older. For every 100 females there were 95.8 males, and for every 100 females age 18 and over there were 93.3 males age 18 and over.

Of the 188,496 households, 32.0% had children under the age of 18 living in them. Of all households, 57.5% were married-couple households, 14.4% were households with a male householder with no spouse or partner present, and 23.0% were households with a female householder with no spouse or partner present. About 23.5% of all households were made up of individuals, 10.9% had someone living alone who was 65 years of age or older, the average household size was 2.61, and the average family size was 3.17.

There were 197,722 housing units, of which 4.7% were vacant. Among occupied housing units, 72.2% were owner-occupied and 27.8% were renter-occupied. The homeowner vacancy rate was 1.2% and the rental vacancy rate was 5.5%.

91.4% of residents lived in urban areas, while 8.6% lived in rural areas.

The county's median household income was $116,283, and the median family income was $141,633. About 5.5% of the population were below the poverty line, including 5.1% of those under age 18 and 5.6% of those age 65 or over.

=== Racial and ethnic composition ===
Morris County, New Jersey – Racial and ethnic composition Note: the US Census treats Hispanic/Latino as an ethnic category. This table excludes Latinos from the racial categories and assigns them to a separate category. Hispanics/Latinos may be of any race.
Race / Ethnicity (NH = Non-Hispanic)	Pop 1980	Pop 1990	Pop 2000	Pop 2010	Pop 2020	% 1980	% 1990	% 2000	% 2010	% 2020
White alone (NH)	378,857	372,418	385,582	369,551	341,175	92.94%	88.39%	82.00%	75.07%	66.99%
Black or African American alone (NH)	9,811	11,931	12,506	14,134	15,586	2.41%	2.83%	2.66%	2.87%	3.06%
Native American or Alaska Native alone (NH)	222	378	379	369	373	0.05%	0.09%	0.08%	0.07%	0.07%
Asian alone (NH)	6,782	16,556	29,310	43,862	57,700	1.66%	3.93%	6.23%	8.91%	11.33%
Native Hawaiian or Pacific Islander alone (NH)	x	x	148	70	93	x	x	0.03%	0.01%	0.02%
Other race alone (NH)	1,006	256	646	806	2,337	0.25%	0.06%	0.14%	0.16%	0.46%
Mixed race or Multiracial (NH)	x	x	5,015	7,002	15,360	x	x	1.07%	1.42%	3.02%
Hispanic or Latino (any race)	10,952	19,814	36,626	56,482	76,661	2.69%	4.70%	7.79%	11.47%	15.05%
Total	407,630	421,353	470,212	492,276	509,285	100.00%	100.00%	100.00%	100.00%	100.00%

=== 2010 census ===
The 2010 United States census counted 492,276 people, 180,534 households, and 129,262 families in the county. The population density was 1,069.8 per square mile (413.1/km^{2}). There were 189,842 housing units at an average density of 412.5 per square mile (159.3/km^{2}). The racial makeup was 82.61% (406,683) White, 3.12% (15,360) Black or African American, 0.16% (805) Native American, 8.95% (44,069) Asian, 0.02% (106) Pacific Islander, 3.03% (14,910) from other races, and 2.10% (10,343) from two or more races. Hispanic or Latino residents of any race were 11.47% (56,482) of the population.

Of the 180,534 households, 33.9% had children under the age of 18; 59.6% were married couples living together; 8.5% had a female householder with no husband present and 28.4% were non-families. Of all households, 23.5% were made up of individuals and 9.5% had someone living alone who was 65 years of age or older. The average household size was 2.68 and the average family size was 3.19.

23.9% of the population were under the age of 18, 7.1% from 18 to 24, 25.2% from 25 to 44, 30% from 45 to 64, and 13.8% who were 65 years of age or older. The median age was 41.3 years. For every 100 females, the population had 95.9 males. For every 100 females ages 18 and older there were 93.2 males.

== Government ==
=== County government ===
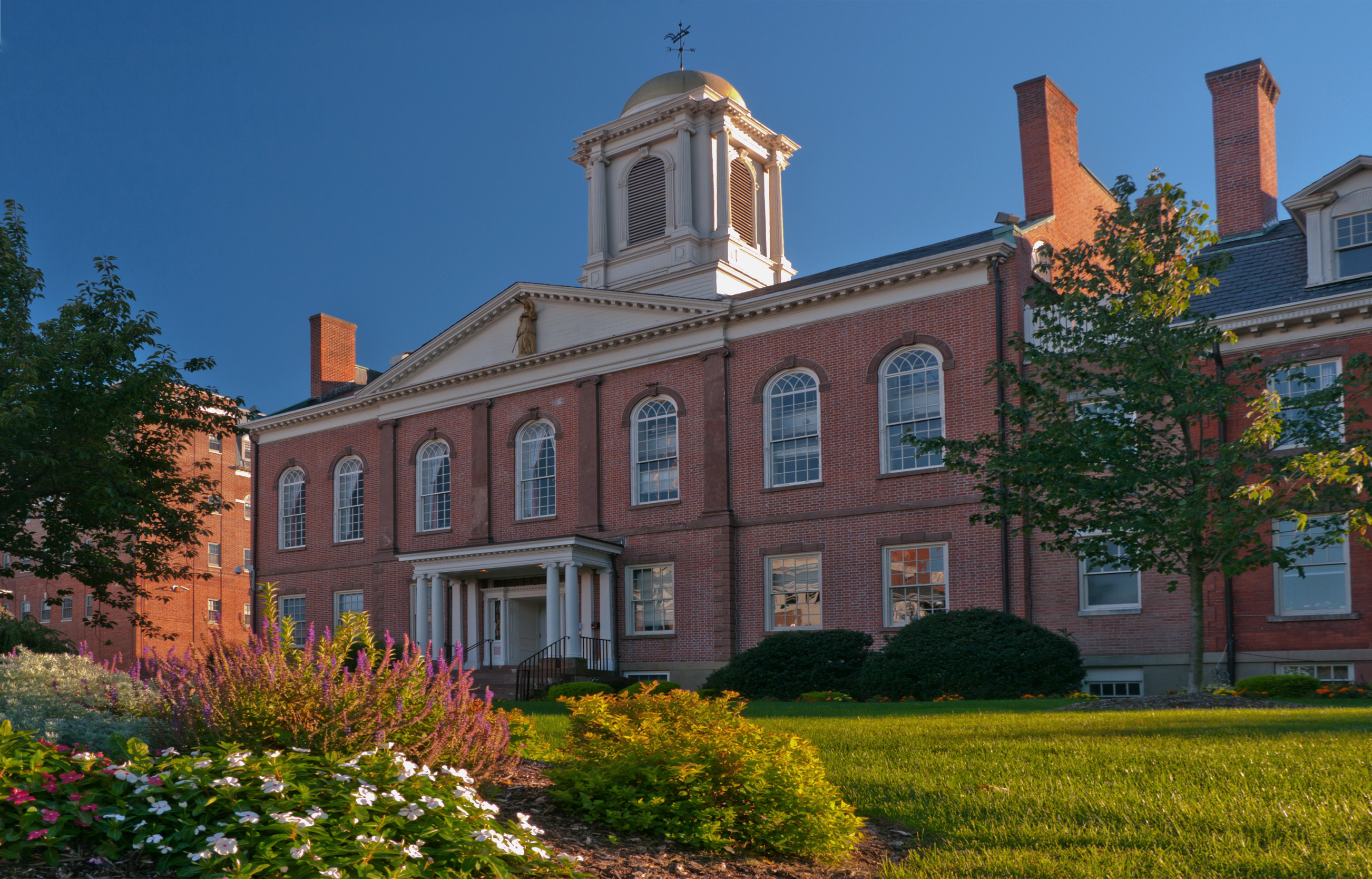
Morris County Courthouse, built 1827, in Morristown

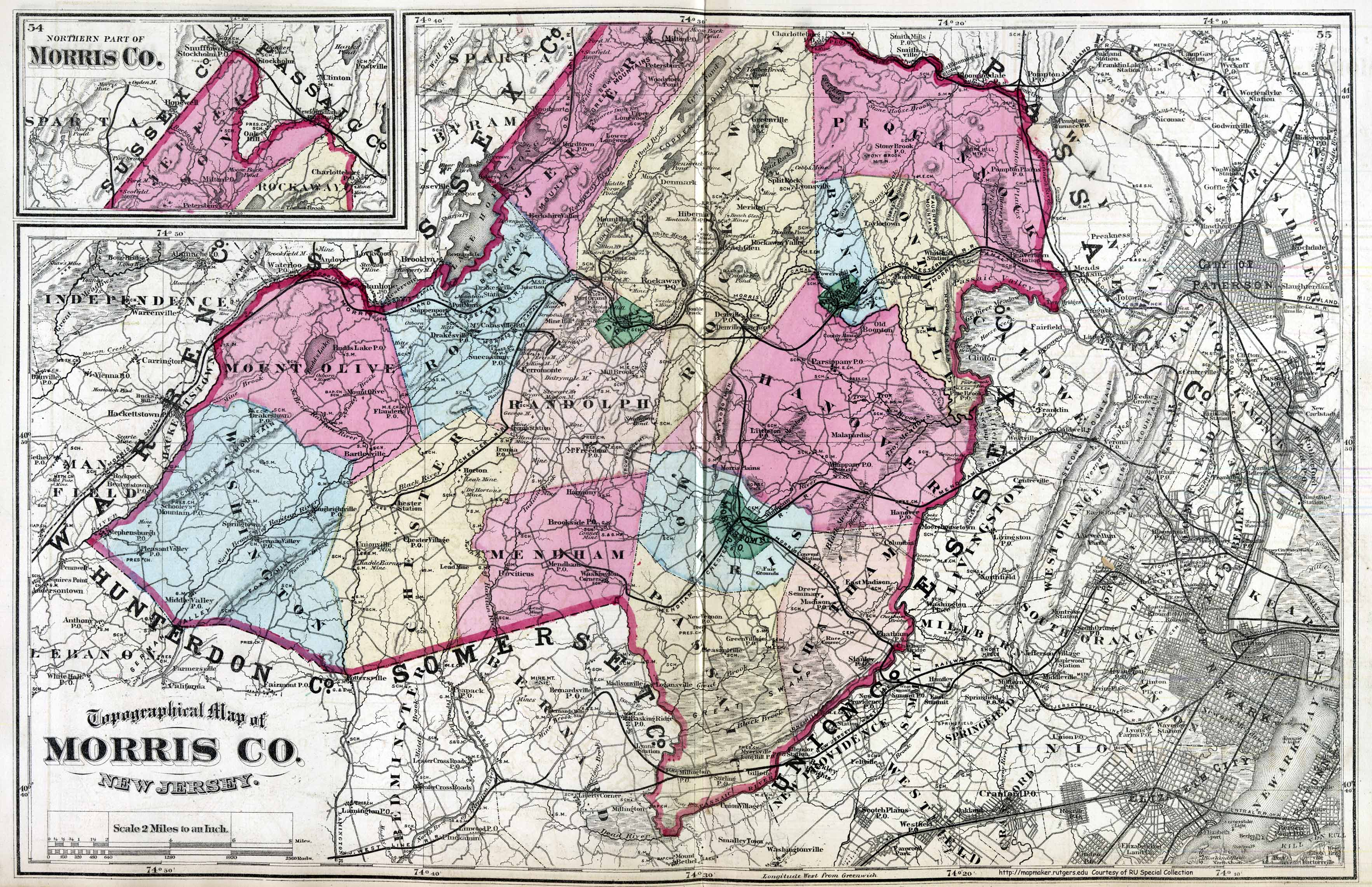
Morris County in 1872

Morris County is governed by a Board of County Commissioners comprised of seven members who are elected at-large in partisan elections to three-year terms on a staggered basis, with either one or three seats up for election each year as part of the November general election. Actual day-to-day operation of departments is supervised by County Administrator Deena Leary.

As of 2026, Morris County's Commissioners (with all terms ending December 31) are Director Stephen H. Shaw (R, Mountain Lakes, 2027), Deputy Director John Krickus (R, Washington Township, 2027), Douglas Cabana (R, Boonton Township, 2025), Thomas J. Mastrangelo (R, Montville, 2028), Christine Myers (R, Harding Township, 2028), Tayfun Selen (R, Chatham Township, 2026) and Deborah Smith (R, Denville Township, 2027).

In 2016, freeholders were paid $24,375 and the freeholder director was paid an annual salary of $25,350.

==== Former commissioners ====
No Democrat has been elected to county-wide office since 1973; the longest Democratic drought in any New Jersey county. Former county commissioners include:

- 2018–2020: Heather Darling (R)
- 2013–2019: John Cesaro (R)
- 2012–2018: Hank Lyon (R)
- 2013–2015: David Scapicchio (R)
- 2007–2012: Eugene Feyl (R)
- 1999–2012: Margaret Nordstrom (R)
- 2006–2012: William Chegwidden (R)
- 1998–2012: John Murphy (R)
- 1999–2010: Jack Schrier (R)
- 2007–2010: James Murray (R)
- 2001–2007: John Inglesino (R)
- 1992–2006: Cecilia Laureys (R)
- 1984, 1992–2006: Frank Dreutzler (R)
- 1995–1997: Chris Christie (R)
- 1975–1978: Douglas Romaine (D)

Pursuant to Article VII Section II of the New Jersey State Constitution, each county in New Jersey is required to have three elected administrative officials known as constitutional officers. These officers are the County Clerk and County Surrogate (both elected for five-year terms of office) and the County Sheriff (elected for a three-year term). As of 2026, they are County Clerk Ann F. Grossi (R, Parsippany–Troy Hills, 2028), Sheriff James M. Gannon (R, Boonton Township, 2028) and Surrogate Heather Darling (R, Roxbury, 2029).

The County Prosecutor is Robert J. Carroll, who was sworn into the position in October 2020 following the retirement of Frederic M. Knapp. Morris County is a part of Vicinage 10 of the New Jersey Superior Court (along with Sussex County), which is seated at the Morris County Courthouse in Morristown; the Assignment Judge for Vicinage 10 is Stuart A. Minkowitz. Law enforcement at the county level is the Morris County Sheriff's Office. The Morris County Park Police was disbanded and merged into the Sheriff's Office on January 1, 2022. The County law enforcement organization includes the Morris County Prosecutor's Office.

=== Federal representatives ===
The 7th and 11th Congressional Districts cover the county. For the 119th United States Congress, New Jersey's 7th congressional district is represented by Thomas Kean Jr. (R, Westfield). For the 119th United States Congress, New Jersey's 11th congressional district is represented by Analilia Mejia (D, Glen Ridge) who was elected in a 2026 special election to serve for the remainder of the Congress following the resignation Mikie Sherrill (D, Montclair), who was elected Governor of New Jersey in 2025.

=== State representatives ===
The 39 municipalities of Morris County are represented by four legislative districts.

District	Senator	Assembly	Municipalities
21st	Jon Bramnick (R)	Vincent "Vinnie" Kearney (D) Andrew Macurdy (D)	Chatham Borough, Chatham Township, and Long Hill. The remainder of this district covers portions of Middlesex County, Somerset County and Union County.
24th	Parker Space (R)	Dawn Fantasia (R) Mike Inganamort (R)	Chester Borough, Chester Township, Mount Olive, Netcong, Roxbury, and Washington Township. The remainder of this district covers all of Sussex County and portions of Warren County.
25th	Anthony M. "Tony" Bucco (R)	Aura K. Dunn (R) Marisa Sweeney (D)	Boonton Township, Butler, Dover, Harding, Jefferson Township, Kinnelon, Madison, Mendham Borough, Mendham Township, Mine Hill, Morris Township, Morristown, Mount Arlington, Randolph, Rockaway Borough, Rockaway Township, Victory Gardens, and Wharton. The remainder of this district covers a portion of Passaic County.
26th	Joseph Pennacchio (R)	Brian Bergen (R) Jay Webber (R)	Boonton, Denville, East Hanover, Florham Park, Hanover, Lincoln Park, Montville, Morris Plains, Mountain Lakes, Parsippany–Troy Hills, Pequannock, and Riverdale. The remainder of this district covers portions of Passaic County.

=== Other ===
The Morris Automated Information Network, which supplies Internet service to area libraries, turned down $10,000 per year in federal funding, starting in 2004. Acceptance of the grants would have required the network to install anti-porn content filters to comply with the Children's Internet Protection Act. As these filters excluded legitimate information—such as pages with the word "breast" in online searches regarding "breast cancer"—the network declined to accept these grants.

Another organization having the power to affect the county budget without county governmental control is the Morris County Board of Taxation, (also called the Morris County Tax Board). "[T]he freeholders, and county government in general, do not have control over tax board spending. ... [T]he tax board is an entity of state government, even though it submits expense vouchers to county government."

== Politics ==
United States presidential election results for Morris County, New Jersey
Year	Republican		Democratic		Third party(ies)	
Year	No.	%	No.	%	No.	%
1896	8,190	58.71%	4,936	35.38%	825	5.91%
1900	7,743	54.48%	5,793	40.76%	676	4.76%
1904	8,201	57.73%	4,768	33.56%	1,237	8.71%
1908	9,089	61.16%	5,026	33.82%	747	5.03%
1912	3,329	23.70%	5,628	40.07%	5,089	36.23%
1916	8,530	54.23%	6,798	43.22%	400	2.54%
1920	20,686	71.50%	7,256	25.08%	989	3.42%
1924	24,812	69.59%	8,042	22.56%	2,801	7.86%
1928	33,189	68.35%	15,188	31.28%	182	0.37%
1932	31,481	59.17%	20,117	37.81%	1,604	3.01%
1936	32,365	55.86%	24,978	43.11%	600	1.04%
1940	39,720	61.47%	24,698	38.23%	194	0.30%
1944	39,732	64.74%	21,454	34.96%	186	0.30%
1948	42,558	68.01%	18,864	30.15%	1,152	1.84%
1952	62,847	72.55%	23,662	27.31%	120	0.14%
1956	76,571	79.37%	19,503	20.22%	395	0.41%
1960	75,039	63.66%	42,698	36.22%	146	0.12%
1964	55,024	42.68%	73,684	57.16%	205	0.16%
1968	85,512	57.75%	52,398	35.39%	10,152	6.86%
1972	113,469	68.18%	50,937	30.60%	2,028	1.22%
1976	105,921	61.45%	63,749	36.98%	2,703	1.57%
1980	105,260	60.63%	48,965	28.20%	19,379	11.16%
1984	137,719	71.91%	53,201	27.78%	584	0.30%
1988	127,420	68.05%	58,721	31.36%	1,108	0.59%
1992	108,431	51.82%	67,593	32.31%	33,208	15.87%
1996	95,830	48.96%	81,092	41.43%	18,823	9.62%
2000	111,066	53.78%	88,039	42.63%	7,403	3.58%
2004	135,241	57.51%	98,066	41.70%	1,847	0.79%
2008	132,331	53.46%	112,275	45.36%	2,913	1.18%
2012	125,279	54.79%	100,563	43.98%	2,805	1.23%
2016	126,071	49.72%	115,249	45.46%	12,217	4.82%
2020	141,134	47.15%	153,881	51.41%	4,307	1.44%
2024	143,439	50.39%	135,672	47.66%	5,555	1.95%

Though New Jersey is mainly a Democratic state, Morris County has generally leaned towards the Republican Party. The GOP has carried the county in all but three presidential elections starting in 1896: in 1912, 1964, and 2020. Republicans hold every countywide elected office and all of the county's seats in the state legislature. The last Democrat to win a county office was Commissioner Douglas Romaine in 1973. Cory Booker in 2020 became the first Democrat to win the county in a Senate election since Bill Bradley in 1984.

In 2024, Donald Trump flipped the county back to the Republican presidential column, and Republican Curtis Bashaw carried the county against Andy Kim in the concurrent Senate election. In the 2025 New Jersey gubernatorial election, Democrat Mikie Sherrill won the county, for the first time since 1973.

As of October 1, 2021, there were a total of 397,571 registered voters in Morris County, of whom 136,127 (34.2%) were registered as Republicans, 117,323 (29.5%) were registered as Democrats and 140,145 (35.3%) were registered as unaffiliated. There were 3,976 voters (1.0%) registered to other parties.

Senate Class 1 election results

United States Senate election results for Morris County, New Jersey1
Year	Republican		Democratic		Third party(ies)	
Year	No.	%	No.	%	No.	%
2024	135,636	50.49%	127,727	47.54%	5,289	1.97%
2018	114,783	53.38%	93,763	43.60%	6,492	3.02%
2012	114,078	54.36%	93,209	44.42%	2,561	1.22%
2006	85,656	57.17%	61,431	41.00%	2,738	1.83%
2000	118,283	60.97%	69,889	36.03%	5,817	3.00%
1994	75,717	59.53%	49,241	38.71%	2,237	1.76%
1988	103,843	56.39%	79,237	43.03%	1,057	0.57%
1982	82,251	66.11%	41,134	33.06%	1,031	0.83%

Senate Class 2 election results

United States Senate election results for Morris County, New Jersey2
Year	Republican		Democratic		Third party(ies)	
Year	No.	%	No.	%	No.	%
2020	141,373	48.59%	146,148	50.23%	3,453	1.19%
2014	64,688	55.57%	49,920	42.88%	1,807	1.55%
2013	54,665	56.43%	41,317	42.65%	889	0.92%
2008	124,198	55.85%	94,558	42.52%	3,620	1.63%
2002	79,984	57.97%	55,592	40.29%	2,406	1.74%
1996	103,283	54.77%	73,921	39.20%	11,378	6.03%
1990	66,369	57.57%	46,928	40.71%	1,983	1.72%
1984	77,683	41.87%	106,678	57.50%	1,154	0.62%

=== State elections ===
Governor election results

Gubernatorial election results for Morris County, New Jersey
Year	Republican		Democratic		Third party(ies)	
Year	No.	%	No.	%	No.	%
2025	111,422	48.67%	116,488	50.89%	1,006	0.44%
2021	102,769	55.28%	81,915	44.06%	1,239	0.67%
2017	77,203	53.12%	65,507	45.08%	2,617	1.80%
2013	98,888	70.09%	39,824	28.23%	2,382	1.69%
2009	99,085	60.04%	51,586	31.26%	14,352	8.70%
2005	82,550	55.95%	60,986	41.34%	3,997	2.71%
2001	79,350	55.79%	60,948	42.85%	1,942	1.37%
1997	97,414	65.40%	41,296	27.72%	10,252	6.88%
1993	98,715	61.88%	58,028	36.37%	2,789	1.75%
1989	67,592	51.66%	61,678	47.14%	1,567	1.20%
1985	85,189	78.44%	22,847	21.04%	566	0.52%
1981	86,882	67.06%	41,310	31.89%	1,362	1.05%
1977	66,288	53.68%	55,033	44.57%	2,160	1.75%
1973	40,524	35.37%	72,539	63.32%	1,495	1.31%
1969	84,144	67.53%	38,613	30.99%	1,843	1.48%
1965	54,306	53.14%	46,174	45.18%	1,709	1.67%
1961	54,564	64.72%	29,216	34.65%	531	0.63%
1957	43,110	55.65%	34,040	43.95%	310	0.40%
1953	36,100	56.51%	26,899	42.11%	884	1.38%

== Municipalities ==
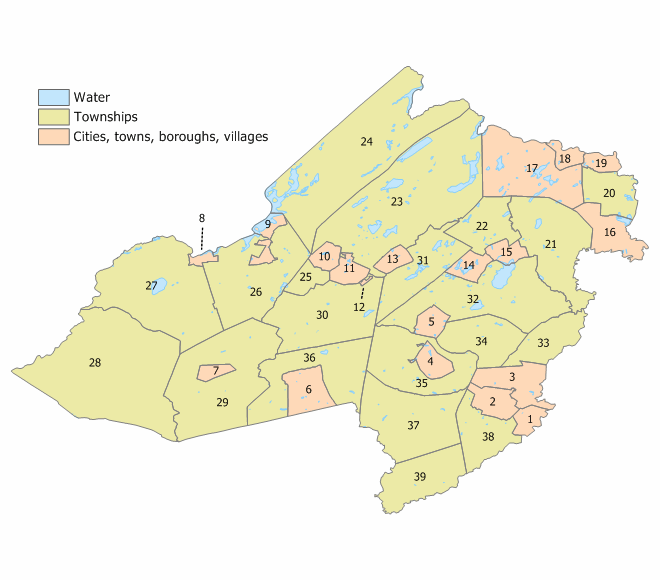
Indexed map of Morris County municipalities (click to see index key)

Interactive map of municipalities in Morris County.

The 39 municipalities in Morris County (with 2010 Census data for population, housing units and area) are:

Municipality (with map key)		Municipal type	Population	Housing Units	Total Area	Water Area	Land Area	Pop. Density	Housing Density	School District	Communities
Boonton Town	15	town	8,815	3,398	2.51	0.17	2.34	3,574.6	1,455.2	Boonton	
Boonton Township	22	township	4,380	1,647	8.63	0.39	8.24	517.2	199.8	Mountain Lakes (9–12) (S/R); Boonton Township (PK-8)	
Butler	18	borough	8,047	3,169	2.09	0.05	2.04	3,703.2	1,556.6	Butler	
Chatham Borough	1	borough	9,212	3,210	2.42	0.05	2.37	3,776.1	1,352.5	The Chathams	
Chatham Township	38	township	10,983	4,128	9.36	0.38	8.98	1,164.2	459.8	The Chathams	Green Village CDP (part; 1,103)
Chester Borough	7	borough	1,681	647	1.60	0.00	1.59	1,034.8	406.0	West Morris (9–12); Chester (PK-8)	
Chester Township	29	township	7,713	2,697	29.46	0.09	29.38	266.8	91.8	West Morris (9–12); Chester (PK-8)	
Denville	31	township	17,107	6,734	12.64	0.77	11.87	1,401.8	567.4	Morris Hills (9–12); Denville Township (PK-8)	Cedar Lake; Estling Lake; Indian Lake; Lake Arrowhead; Mount Tabor CDP (part; 1,244); Union Hill
Dover	11	town	18,460	5,783	2.73	0.05	2.68	6,765.5	2,154.8	Dover	
East Hanover	33	township	11,105	3,976	8.14	0.24	7.89	1,413.7	503.8	Hanover Park (9–12); East Hanover (PK-8)	
Florham Park	3	borough	12,585	4,201	7.54	0.25	7.29	1,604.9	576.4	Hanover Park (9–12); Florham Park (PK-8)	
Hanover	34	township	14,677	5,526	10.73	0.20	10.52	1,302.8	525.0	Hanover Park (9–12); Hanover Township (PK-8)	Cedar Knolls CDP (4,082); Whippany CDP (8,863)
Harding	37	township	3,871	1,610	20.44	0.53	19.92	192.7	80.8	Madison (9–12) (S/R); Harding Township (PK-8)	Green Village CDP (part; 1,103); New Vernon CDP (825)
Jefferson	24	township	20,538	8,597	43.11	3.98	39.13	544.7	219.7	Jefferson Township	Lake Hopatcong CDP (10,232); Lake Swannanoa; Lower Berkshire Valley CDP (part; 617); Newfoundland CDP (part; 1,145); Oak Ridge CDP (part; 10,996); Picatinny Arsenal; Russia
Kinnelon	17	borough	9,966	3,600	19.19	1.20	17.99	569.7	200.1	Kinnelon	Jacksonville; Smoke Rise
Lincoln Park	16	borough	10,915	4,145	6.91	0.53	6.38	1,649.0	649.7	Boonton (9–12) (S/R); Lincoln Park (PK-8)	Jacksonville
Long Hill	39	township	8,629	3,226	12.14	0.29	11.85	734.3	272.2	Watchung Hills (9–12); Long Hill Township (PK-8)	Gillette CDP (2,956); Millington CDP (3,038); Stirling CDP (2,555)
Madison	2	borough	16,937	5,775	4.22	0.01	4.21	3,767.9	1,373.3	Madison	
Mendham Borough	6	borough	4,981	1,798	6.00	0.05	5.95	837.1	302.2	West Morris (9–12); Mendham Borough (PK-8)	
Mendham Township	36	township	5,869	2,062	18.10	0.23	17.87	328.4	115.4	West Morris (9–12); Mendham Township (PK-8)	Brookside CDP (1,737)
Mine Hill	25	township	4,015	1,380	3.03	0.09	2.94	1,241.6	469.3	Dover (7–12) (S/R); Mine Hill (PK-6)	
Montville	21	township	22,450	7,823	19.06	0.58	18.48	1,165.0	423.3	Montville Township	Jacksonville; Pine Brook CDP (5,675); Towaco CDP (5,624)
Morris Plains	5	borough	6,153	2,197	2.59	0.04	2.56	2,163.5	859.2	Morris (9–12) (S/R); Morris Plains (PK-8)	
Morris Township	35	township	22,974	8,502	15.76	0.14	15.62	1,428.3	544.4	Morris	Convent Station; Washington Valley
Morristown	4	town	20,180	8,172	3.03	0.10	2.93	6,284.9	2,789.6	Morris	
Mount Arlington	9	borough	5,909	2,545	2.92	0.75	2.17	2,325.2	1,171.8	Roxbury (9–12) (S/R); Mount Arlington (K-8)	
Mount Olive	27	township	28,886	11,244	31.08	1.67	29.41	956.1	382.4	Mount Olive Township	Budd Lake CDP (9,784); Flanders CDP (9,832)
Mountain Lakes	14	borough	4,472	1,363	2.89	0.27	2.62	1,590.3	521.1	Mountain Lakes	
Netcong	8	borough	3,375	1,449	0.92	0.07	0.84	3,828.4	1,716.4	Lenape Valley (9–12); Netcong (PK-8)	
Parsippany-Troy Hills	32	township	56,162	21,274	25.39	1.83	23.56	2,259.3	902.8	Parsippany-Troy Hills	Greystone Park; Lake Hiawatha CDP (10,194); Mount Tabor CDP (part; 1,244); Parsippany CDP (22,778); Rainbow Lakes CDP (1,255) Troy Hills CDP (5,081)
Pequannock	20	township	15,571	6,794	7.17	0.42	6.75	2,302.7	1,006.7	Pequannock Township	Jacksonville; Pompton Plains CDP (11,144)
Randolph	30	township	26,504	9,343	21.07	0.25	20.82	1,235.9	448.7	Randolph Township	Ironia; Mount Freedom; Shongum
Riverdale	19	borough	4,107	1,657	2.09	0.07	2.01	1,766.5	822.5	Pompton Lakes (9–12) (S/R); Riverdale (PK-8)	
Rockaway Borough	13	borough	6,598	2,521	2.12	0.05	2.07	3,106.7	1,216.5	Morris Hills (9–12); Rockaway Borough (PK-8)	
Rockaway Township	23	township	25,341	9,587	45.55	4.14	41.40	583.4	231.6	Morris Hills (9–12); Rockaway Township (K-8)	Green Pond; Hibernia CDP (208); Lake Telemark CDP (1,172) Mount Hope CDP (2,930); Picatinny Arsenal; White Meadow Lake CDP (8,710)
Roxbury	26	township	22,950	8,582	21.89	1.06	20.83	1,119.9	412.1	Roxbury	Kenvil CDP (1,806); Landing CDP (4,296); Ledgewood CDP (4,903); Lower Berkshire Valley CDP (part; 617); Port Morris CDP (754); Succasunna CDP (10,338)
Victory Gardens	12	borough	1,582	566	0.15	0.00	0.15	10,419.2	3,879.8	Dover	
Washington Township	28	township	18,197	6,488	44.77	0.38	44.39	417.5	146.2	West Morris (9–12); Washington Township (PK-8)	Long Valley CDP (1,827); Middle Valley; Pottersville; Schooley's Mountain; Scrappy Corner
Wharton	10	borough	7,241	2,426	2.22	0.07	2.15	3,039.0	1,130.4	Morris Hills (9–12); Wharton Borough (K-8)	
Morris		county	509,285	189,842	481.62	21.45	460.18	1,069.8	412.5		

=== Secession from Essex County ===
The municipalities of western Essex County have discussed secession from the county, to create a new county or be annexed to Morris County, spurred mainly by a belief that tax policy benefits the poorer, urban, eastern portions of the county at the expense of the wealthier, more suburban municipalities in the western part of Essex County."

Dating back to the 1960s, then-Livingston Mayor William Clark had urged the township to secede from Essex County to join neighboring Morris. Additionally, from 2001 to 2003, Millburn, Montclair and Roseland all held nonbinding ballot referendums on the issue. Then-Montclair mayor Robert J. Russo gave a statement in 2003 about secession, "I've watched Essex County burden our people, with very little to show for it. We're fiscally conservative here and socially progressive – and we're finally rebelling."

== Economy ==
"Smart Growth" in pedestrian-oriented Morristown

Morris County has the third-highest median household income in the United States ($77,340).

The Bureau of Economic Analysis calculated that the county's gross domestic product was $51.2 billion in 2021, which was ranked third in the state and was a 5.0% increase from the prior year.

=== Taxation ===
Based on IRS data for the 2004 tax year, Morris County had the tenth-highest average federal income tax liability per return in the country. Average tax liability was $15,296, representing 16.3% of adjusted gross income. Mountain Lakes ranked among the highest annual property tax bills in New Jersey, and highest in Morris County, in 2018 of $20,471, compared to a statewide average of $8,767.

=== Business ===
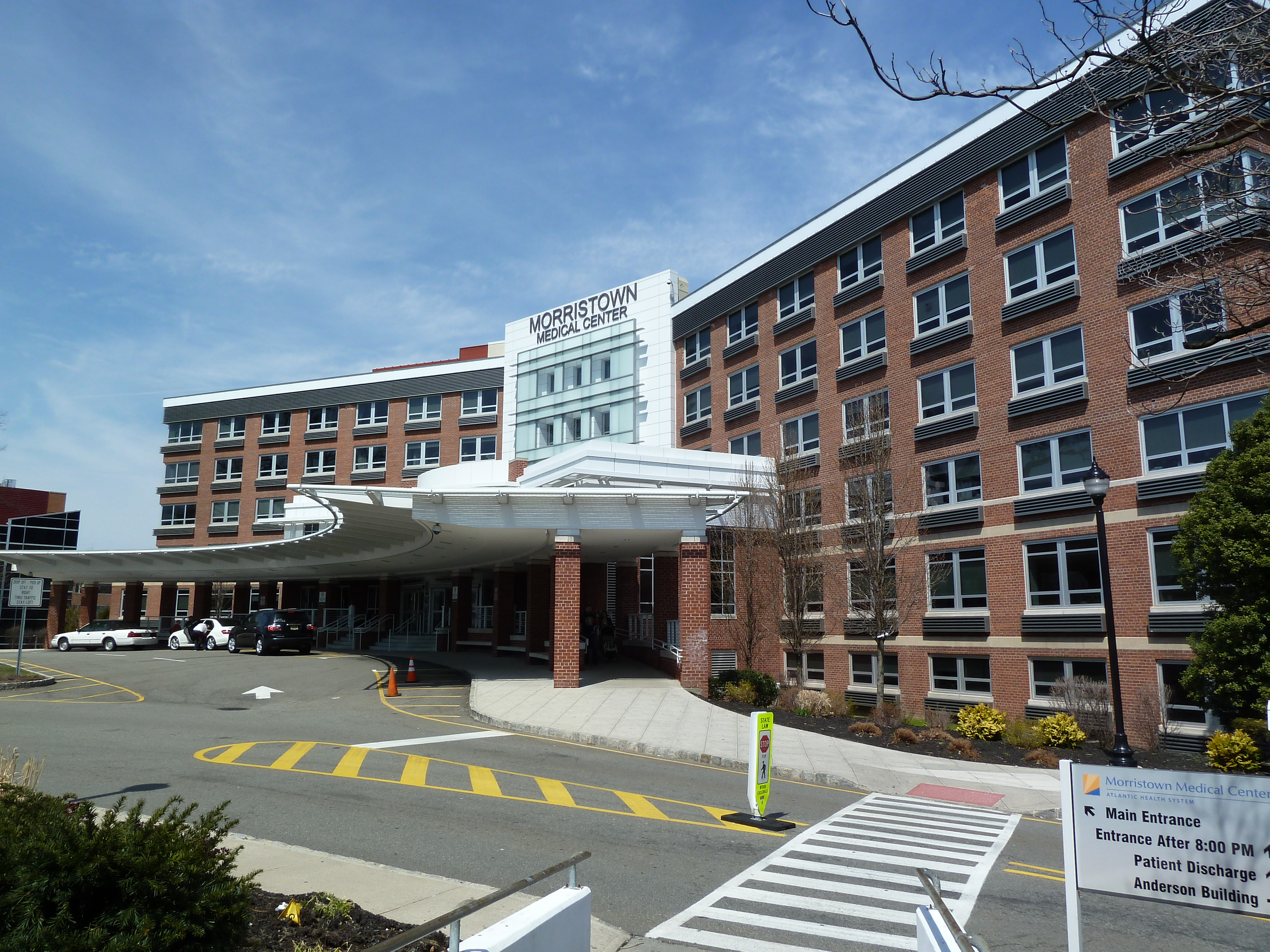
Morristown Medical Center is the flagship of Atlantic Health System

Morris County is home to 33 Fortune 500 businesses that have headquarters, offices or a major facility in Morris County. These include AT&T, Honeywell, Colgate-Palmolive, Pfizer, Johnson & Johnson, ExxonMobil, Novartis, BASF, Verizon, and Bayer, among others. Major industries include finance, insurance, real estate, pharmaceuticals, health services, research and development, and technology. There are 13,000 acres (20 mi^{2}) set aside for 28 county parks. Four county golf courses and 16 public and private courses are in Morris.

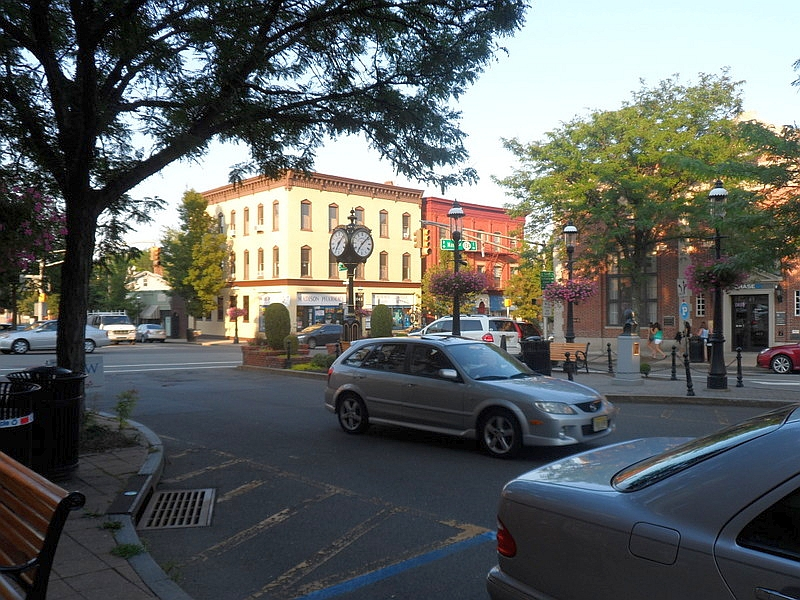
Downtown Madison

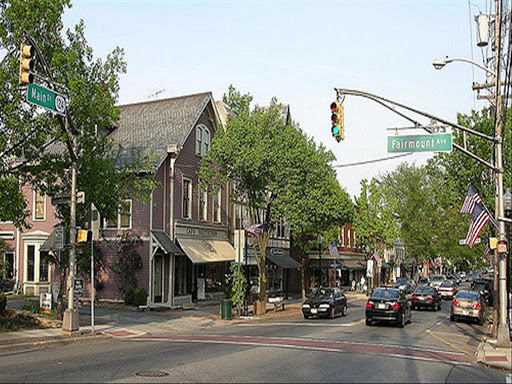
The Downtowns in Madison (above) and Chatham (below) are among the many pedestrian-oriented commercial centers in Morris County

Major employers in the county include:

#	Employer	# of employees
1	Novartis	5,000+
2	Atlantic Health System	2,500–4,999
3	Louis Berger Group	2,500–4,999
4	Picatinny Arsenal	2,500–4,999
5	Saint Clare's Hospital Inc.	2,500–4,999
6	UPS Logistics	1,000–2,499
7	Avis Budget Group	1,000–2,499
8	BASF Chemicals	1,000–2,499
9	ADP Services	1,000–2,499
10	AT&T Info Tech	1,000–2,499

=== Housing expense ===
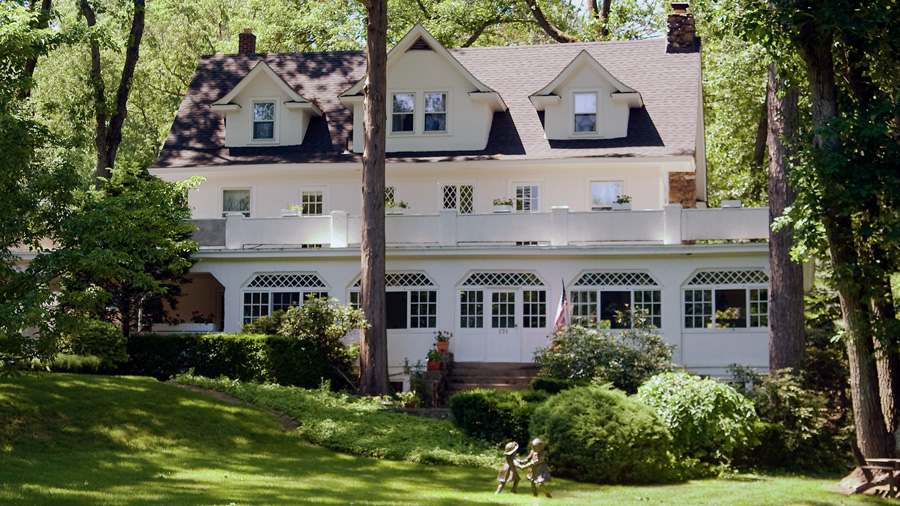
An early 1900s Arts and Crafts influenced Hapgood home located on Boulevard in Mountain Lakes

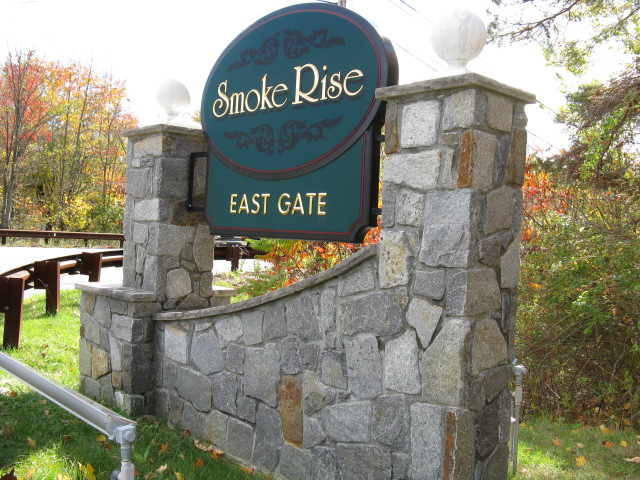
East Gate Entrance to Smoke Rise, an upscale private gated community located in Kinnelon

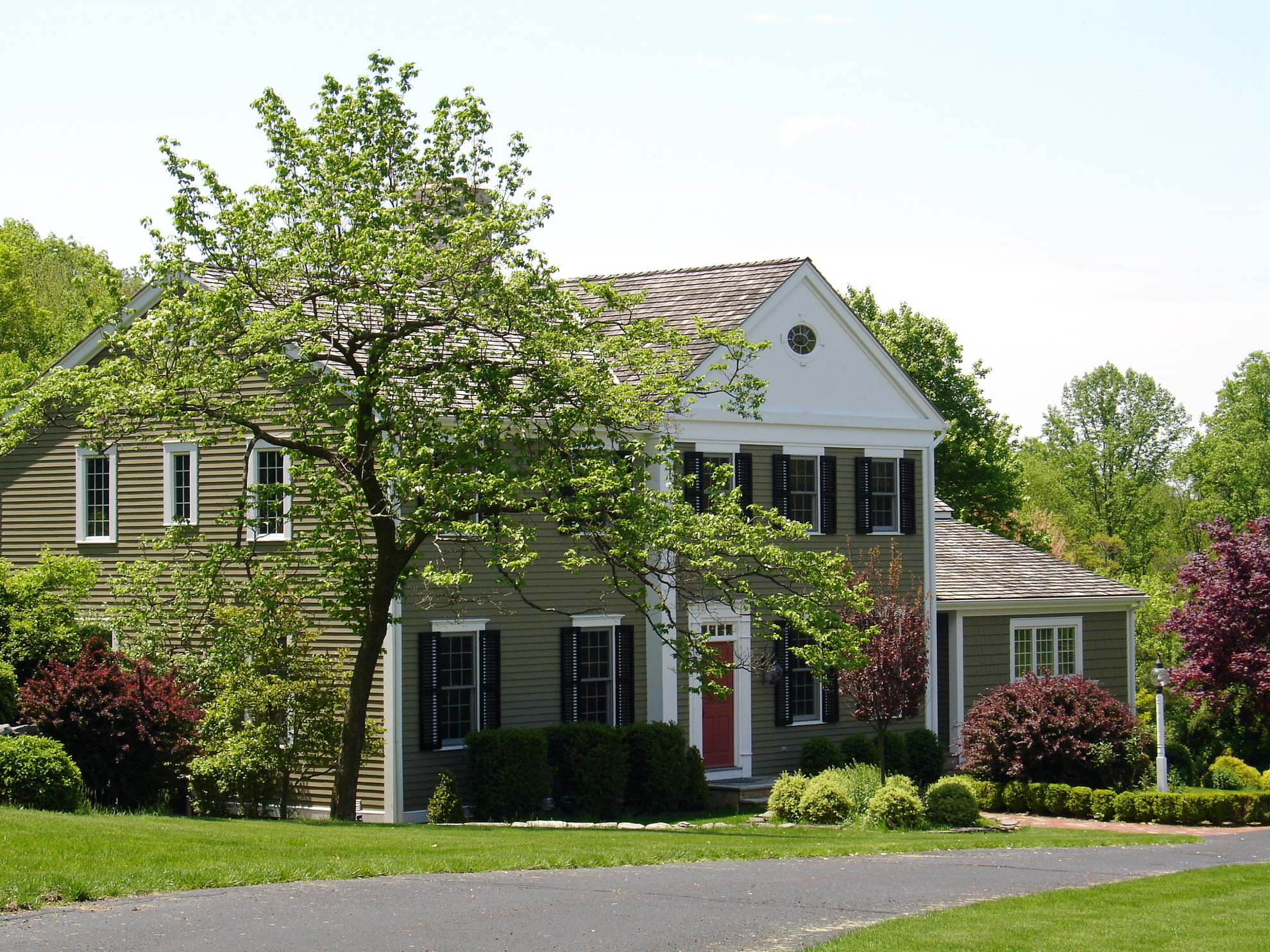
A Federal-style Colonial home located in Chester Township

In 2018, the median house price in Morris County was $469,900, the second highest in the state behind Bergen County (with a median home price of $476,200).

In the Forbes magazine 2012 ranking of the Most Expensive ZIP Codes in the United States, New Vernon (located within Harding Township) was ranked as the 32nd most expensive in the country, with a median home sale price of $2,701,885. There were a total of 6 Morris county zip codes listed in the top 500, which were Mountain Lakes (No. 288; $909,474), Mendham (includes both Mendham Borough and Mendham Township) (No. 356; $800,672), Chatham (includes both Chatham Borough and Chatham Township) (No. 375; $776,703), Florham Park (No. 440; $675,107), and Kinnelon (No. 462; $630,414).

In the magazine's 2006 listing, New Vernon (Harding Township) was ranked as the 23rd most expensive in the country, with its median home sale price in 2005 of $1,596,587 ranking as the state's 2nd highest behind Alpine located in Bergen County. In all, 5 Morris County zip codes were represented on the list in addition to New Vernon, including Mendham (includes both Mendham Borough and Mendham Township) (ranked No. 209; median sale price of $835,000), Mountain Lakes (No. 217; $826,250), Green Village (located within portions of both Harding Township and Chatham Township) (No. 282; $777,465), and Chester (includes both Chester Borough and Chester Township) (No. 288; $775,000).

== Education ==
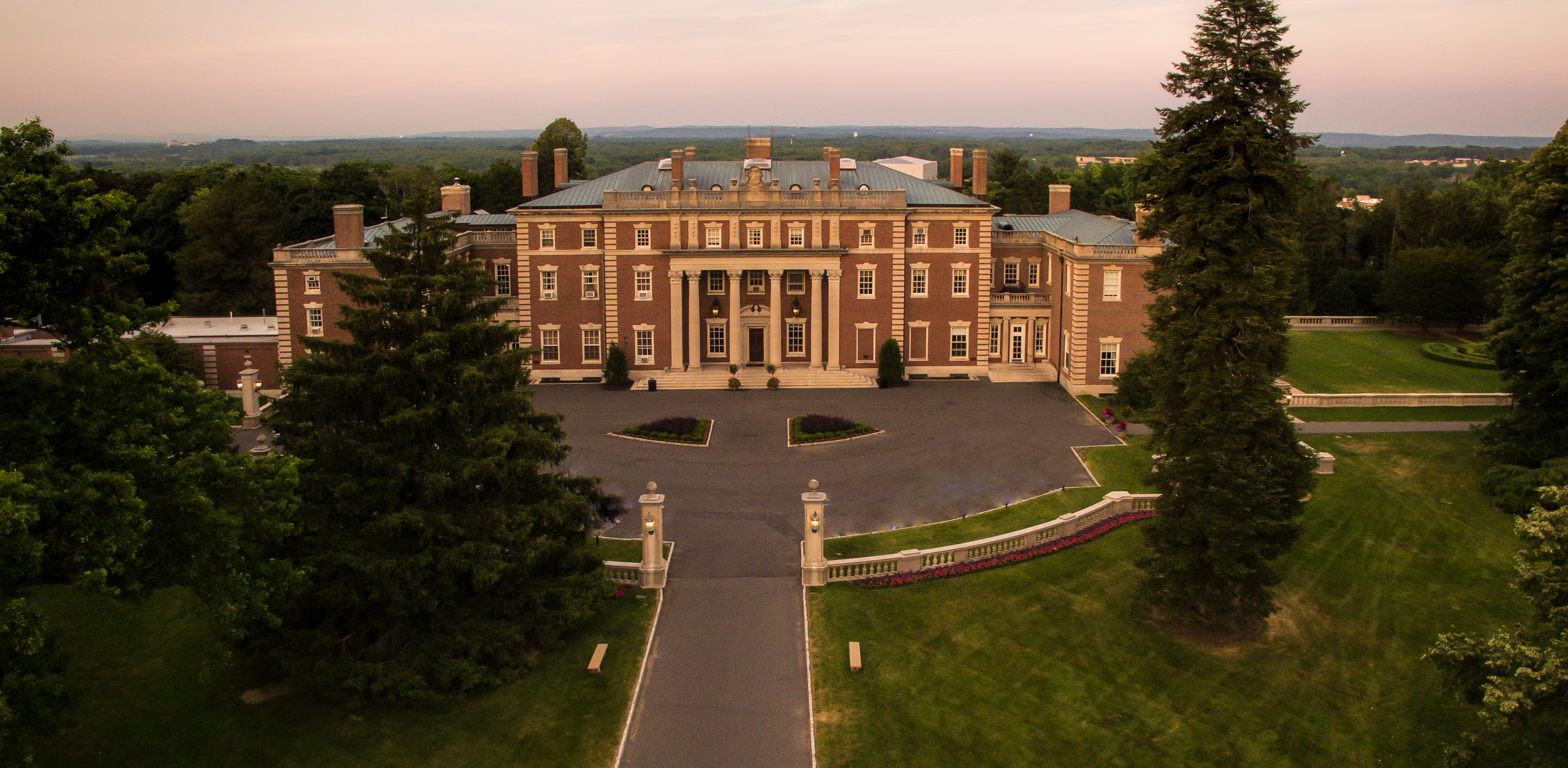
The Vanderbilt-Twombly mansion, centerpiece of FDU's Florham Campus

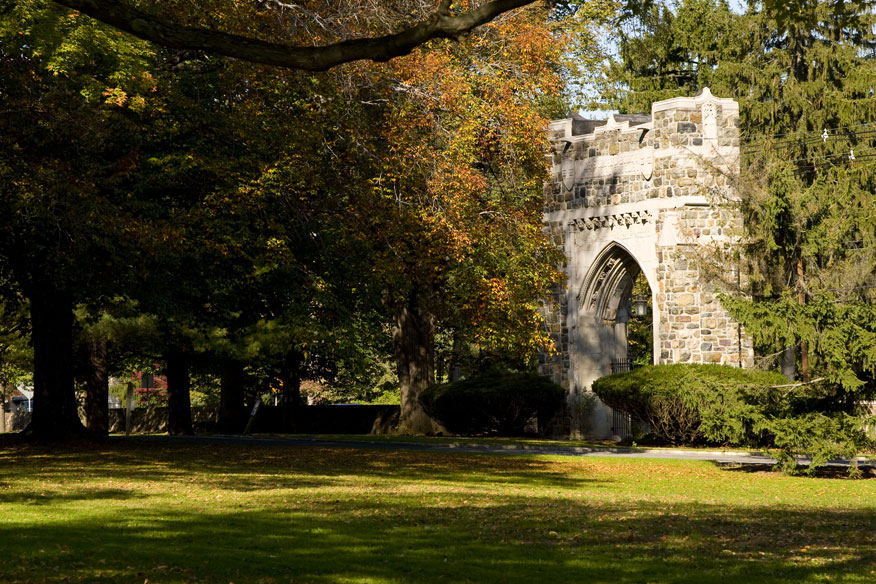
Bowne Memorial Gateway at Drew

As of 2018, 56.1 percent of Morris County residents were college graduates, the 2nd highest percentage in the state behind neighboring Somerset County with 58.0 percent.

- The County College of Morris is a two-year public community college serving students from Morris County, with its main campus in Randolph and was founded in 1965.
- The Assumption College for Sisters is another two-year college, the private Roman Catholic women's college located in Mendham.

The Florham Park–Madison–Convent Station (Morris Township) area is home to three universities:

- The Florham Campus of Fairleigh Dickinson University (FDU) is located on the border of these three municipalities. It is New Jersey's largest private institution of higher education.
- Drew University is a small, private university in Madison. Drew has been nicknamed the "University in the Forest" because of its wooded 186-acre (75 ha) campus.
- Saint Elizabeth University (SEU) (formerly College of Saint Elizabeth) is a private Roman Catholic, four-year, liberal arts college located in Convent Station that has been coeducational starting in September 2016, after being women-only since it opened in 1899.

== Arts and culture ==
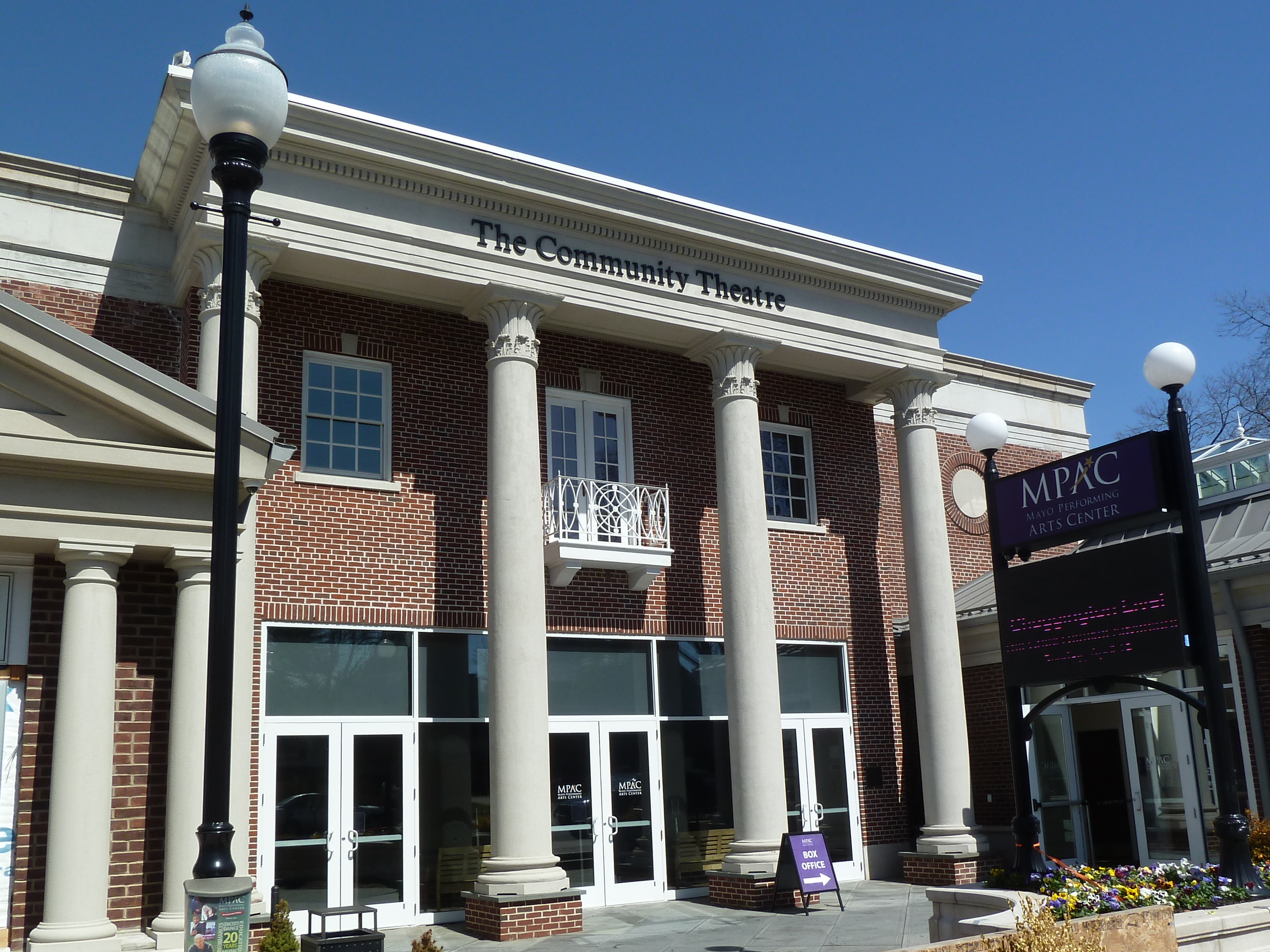
Mayo Performing Arts Center

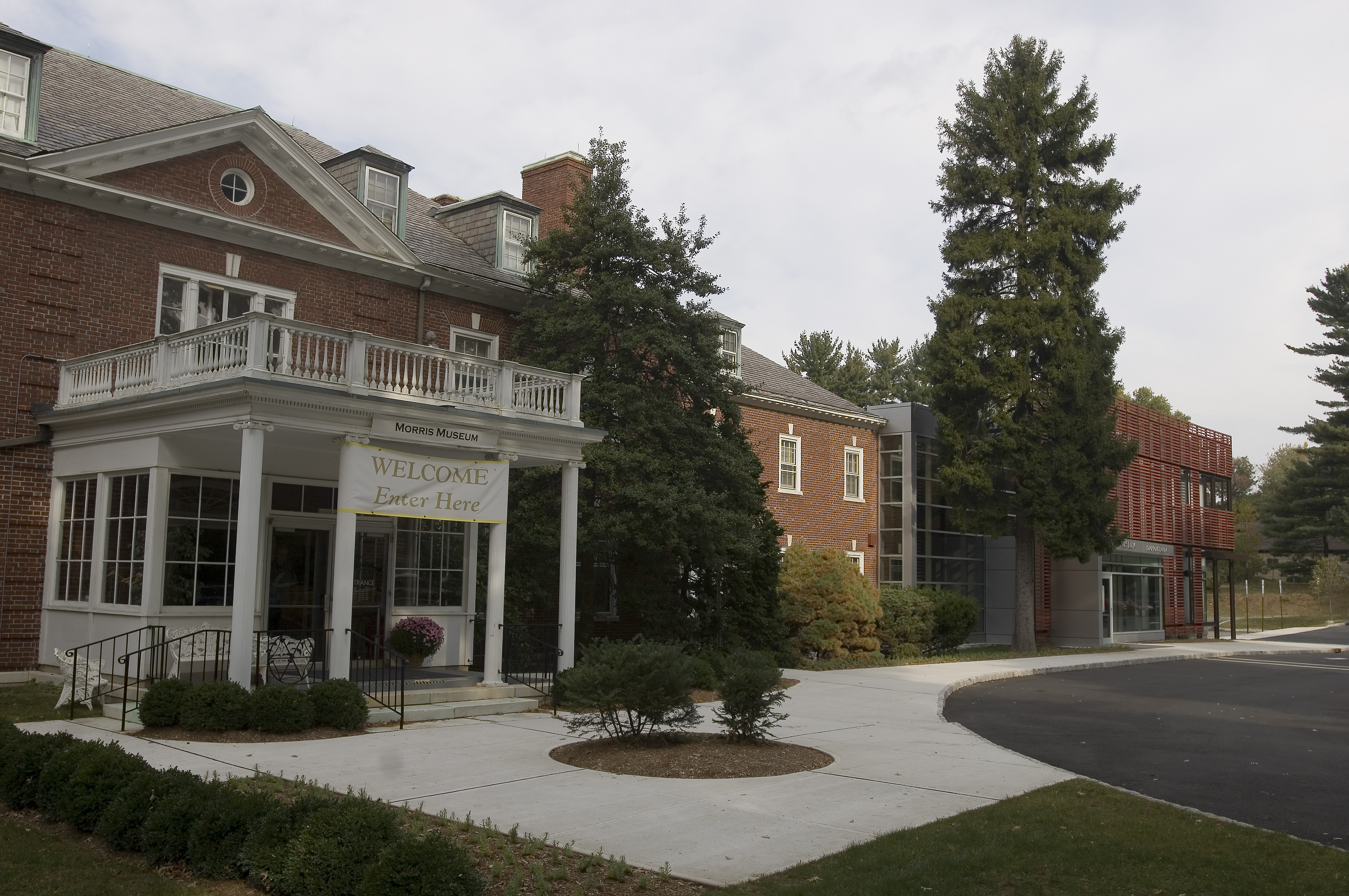
Morris Museum

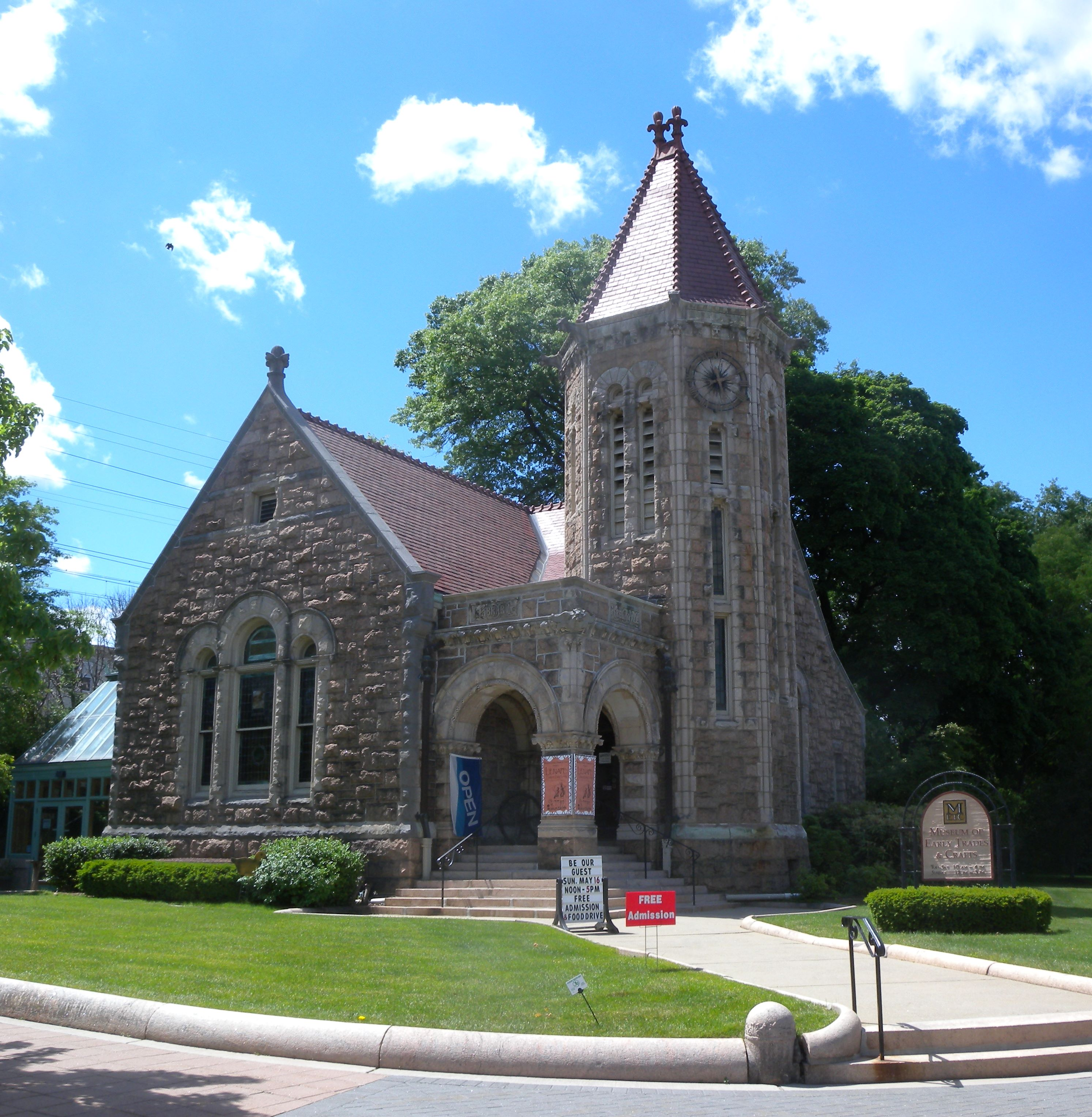
Museum of Early Trades and Crafts

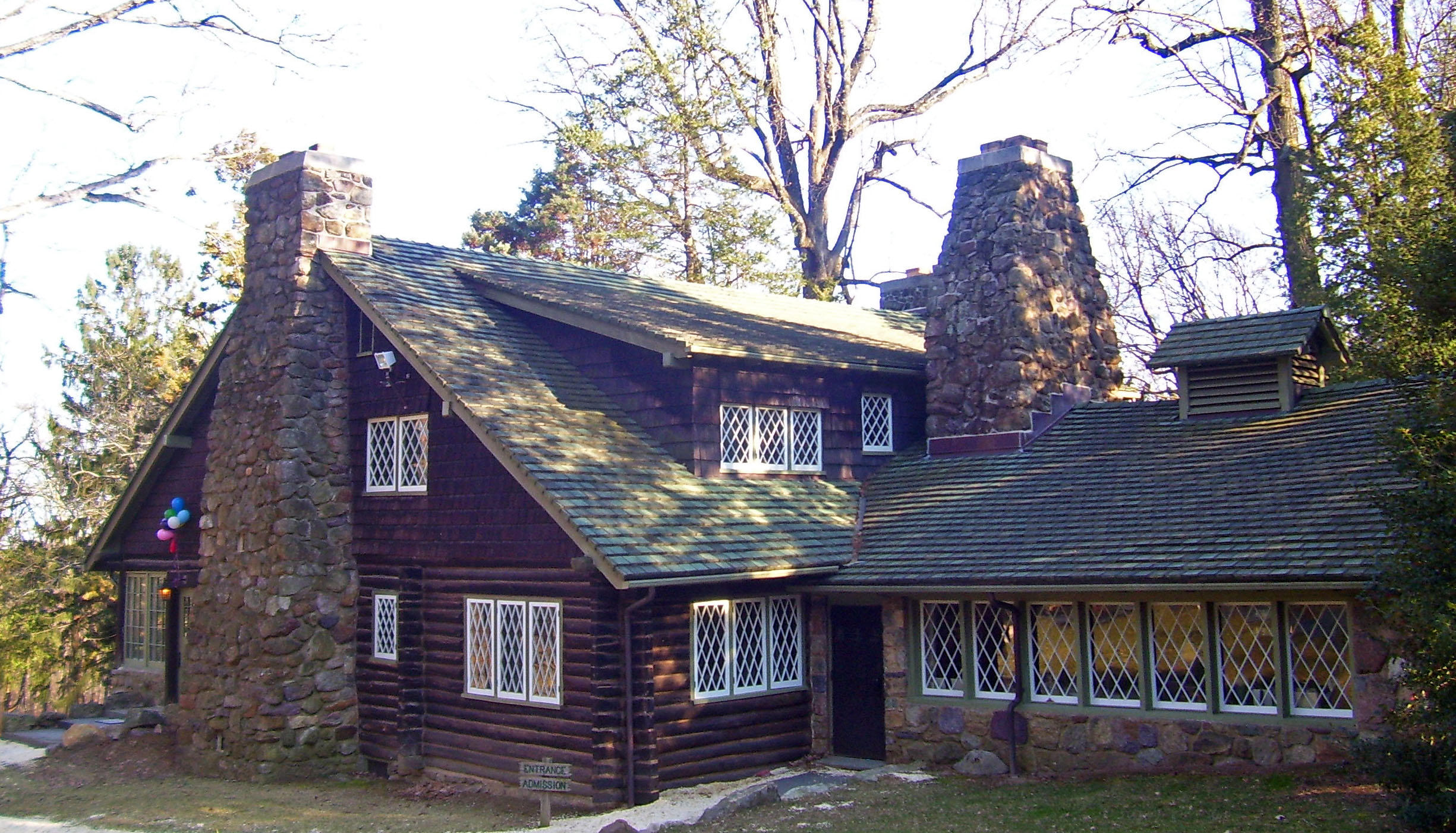
Craftsman Farms

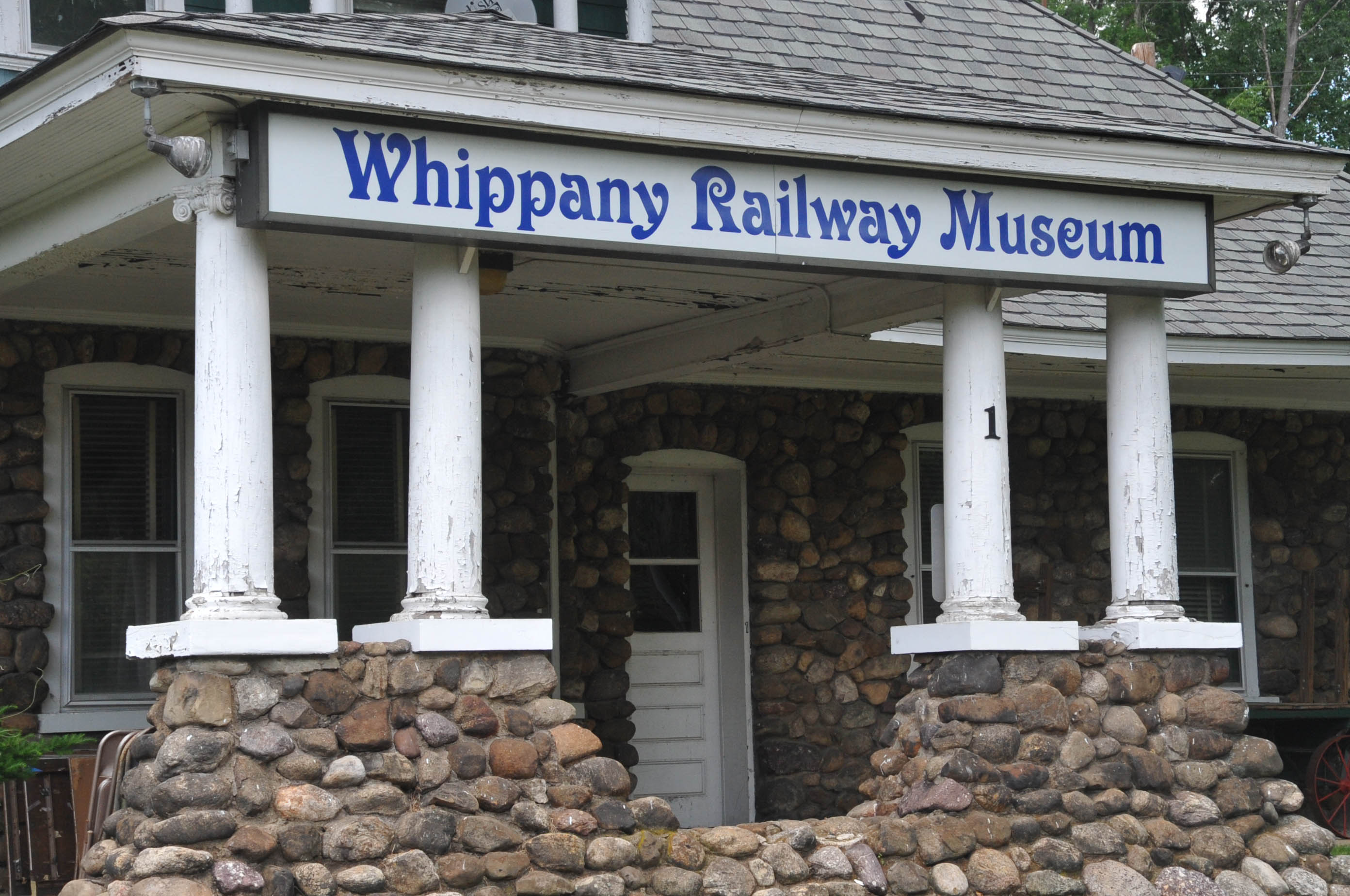
Whippany Railway Museum

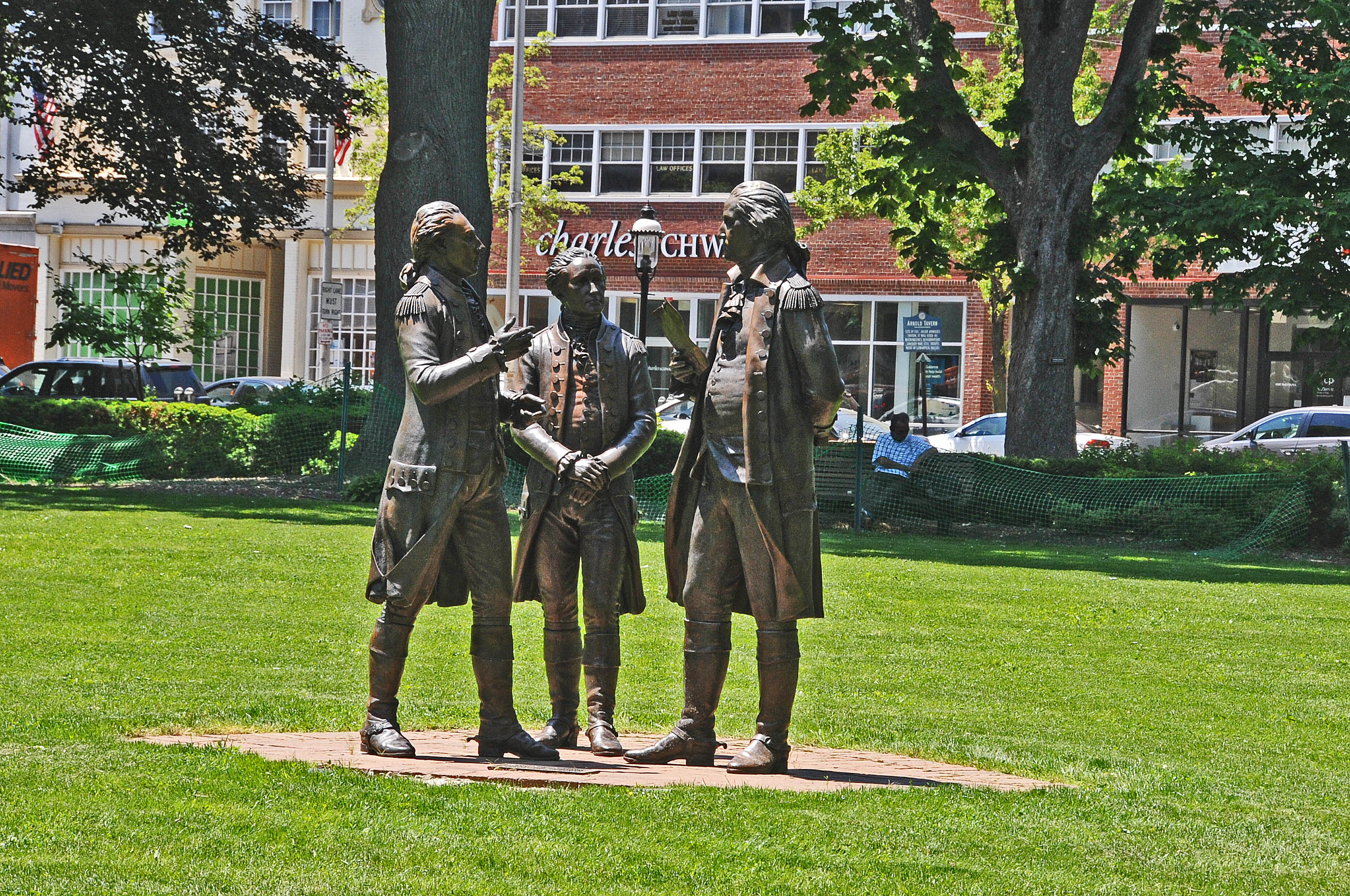
The Alliance on the Green

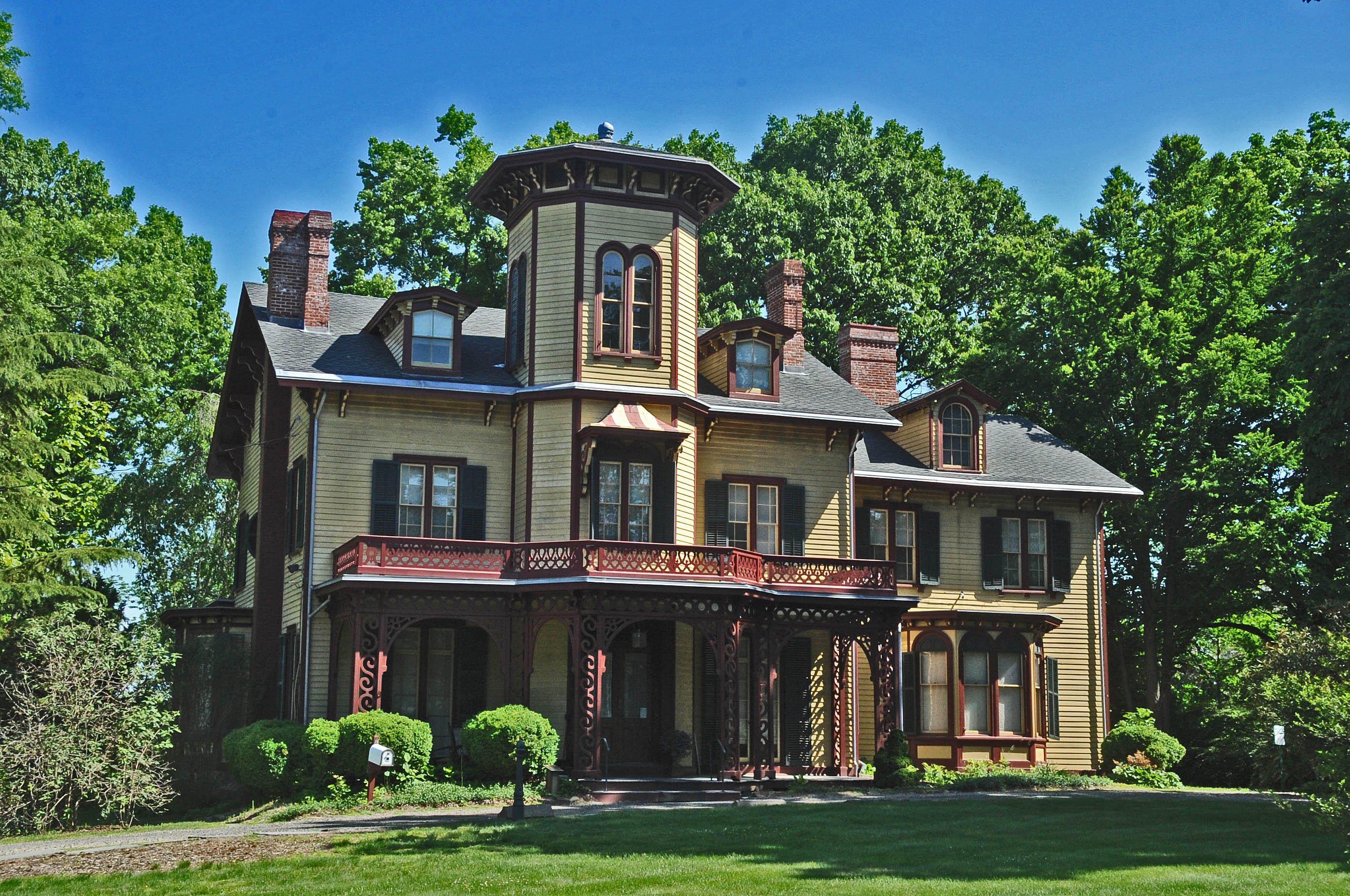
Acorn Hall, headquarters of the Morris County Historical Society

- Mayo Performing Arts Center is a former Walter Reade movie theater originally constructed in 1937 that has been converted into a 1,302-seat performing arts center.
- Shakespeare Theatre of New Jersey is one of 25 professional theatres in the state. Serving 100,000 adults and children annually, it is New Jersey's only professional theatre company dedicated to Shakespeare's canon and other classic masterworks. The F.M. Kirby Shakespeare Theatre, the company's main stage, is a short walk from Madison's downtown shopping district.
- Pax Amicus Castle Theatre is a community theater founded in 1970 that produces a full year-round season of Broadway and off-Broadway revivals, professional productions of works by Shakespeare and Edgar Allan Poe, a program devoted to children's theater, and special events throughout the year. The architecture of the theater is designed to look like a medieval castle.
- Acorn Hall is an 1853 Victorian Italianate mansion and home to the Morris County Historical Society. Donated to the historical society in 1971 by actress and political activist Mary Crane Hone, the mansion retained much of its original furnishings and accouterments as it remained in the same family for over a century. It is currently operated as a museum and is the headquarters of the Morris County Historical Society.
- Morris Museum is the second-largest museum in New Jersey at 75,524 square feet (7,016.4 m^{2}) and has actively been running since 1913 and was formally incorporated in 1943. The museum's permanent displays include rocks, minerals, fossils, animal mounts, a model railroad, and Native American crafts, pottery, carving, basketry and textiles.
- Museum of Early Trades and Crafts was founded in 1969 in the former site of the Madison Public Library to house a collection of over 8,000 tools and artifacts used in New Jersey before 1860 that had been collected by Agnes and Edgar Land.
- Stickley Museum at Craftsman Farms is an early 20th Century farm/farm-school designed in the Craftsman architectural style built by Gustav Stickley, an American furniture manufacturer, design leader, publisher of The Craftsman, and a leading voice in the American Arts and Crafts movement. Craftsman Farms currently operates as a historic house museum showcasing Stickley's original designs and furnishings.
- Whippany Railway Museum is a railway museum established in 1965 that is dedicated to preserving the heritage and history of the railroads of New Jersey through the restoration, preservation, interpretation and operation of historic railroad equipment and artifacts from New Jersey and the immediate vicinity.
- Morristown Green is a historic park at the center of town which was the old town "common" or "green". It is the site of several Revolutionary War and Civil war monuments, and is surrounded by historic churches, the colonial county-courthouse, and a shopping and restaurant district.
- Morristown National Historical Park — Four historic sites around Morristown associated with the American Revolutionary War, including Jockey Hollow, a park that includes a visitor center, the Revolution-era Wick farm, encampment site of George Washington's Continental Army, and around 25 miles of hiking trails, and the Washington's Headquarters & Ford Mansion, a Revolution-era Georgian-style mansion used by George Washington as his headquarters during the Jockey Hollow encampment.
  - Jockey Hollow, a few miles south of Morristown, New Jersey along Route 202 in Harding Township, was the site of a Continental Army encampment. It was from here that the entire Pennsylvania contingent mutinied and later, 200 New Jersey soldiers attempted to emulate them.
  - Fort Nonsense occupied a high hilltop overlooking Morristown, and is believed to have been the site of a signal fire or smoke signal, along with earthworks. It was originally built at the order of General George Washington in 1777 for use during the American Revolutionary War that began in 1775 and was ended in 1783 by the Treaty of Paris.
  - Ford Mansion in Morristown was the site of the "hard winter" (December 1779 – May 1780) quarters of George Washington and the Continental Army. That winter remains the coldest on record for New Jersey. Theodosia Ford, widow of Jacob Ford Jr., and her four children shared their household with Washington, his staff, including Alexander Hamilton, their servants and sometimes their family members. Martha Washington traveled from Mount Vernon to Morristown to spend the winter with her husband.
  - Washington's Headquarters Museum, the adjacent museum, is open to the public Wednesday through Sunday from September to June and seven days a week from July to August from 9:30 AM to 5:00 PM. The museum has three exhibit rooms and a sales area. A video production, Morristown: Where America Survived (New Jersey Network, 2009) is shown. The Ford Mansion is shown only by guided tour, which begins in the museum.
  - New Jersey Brigade Encampment Site is located south of Jockey Hollow in Bernardsville in Somerset County and extending into Harding Township; it was the encampment for approximately 1,300 Continental Army soldiers over the 1779-1780 winter.
- St. Peter's Episcopal Church is a large McKim Mead and White church with a bell tower, fine stained glass and medieval furnishings. The congregation has roots going back to the 1760s and was officially founded in 1827, with the current building consecrated in 1911 featuring gothic-revival architecture, medieval interior and fine stained glass. St. Peter's congregation has traditionally worshipped in the High Church tradition.
- Speedwell Ironworks is a National Historic Landmark and museum at the site where the electric telegraph was first presented to the public, on January 11, 1838. Speedwell Ironworks also provided most of the machinery for the SS Savannah, the first steamship to cross the Atlantic Ocean.

=== Sports ===
The United States Equestrian Team, the international equestrian team for the United States, was founded in 1950 at the Coates estate on Van Beuren Road in Morristown.

Morristown has a cricketing club, the first in North America.

The Mennen Arena in Morris Township, facilitated by The Morris County Park Commission, hosts various sporting events from ice hockey, figure skating, indoor football and outdoor rugby, to professional wrestling, MMA and Shrine Circus.

== Points of interest ==
=== Parks and recreation ===
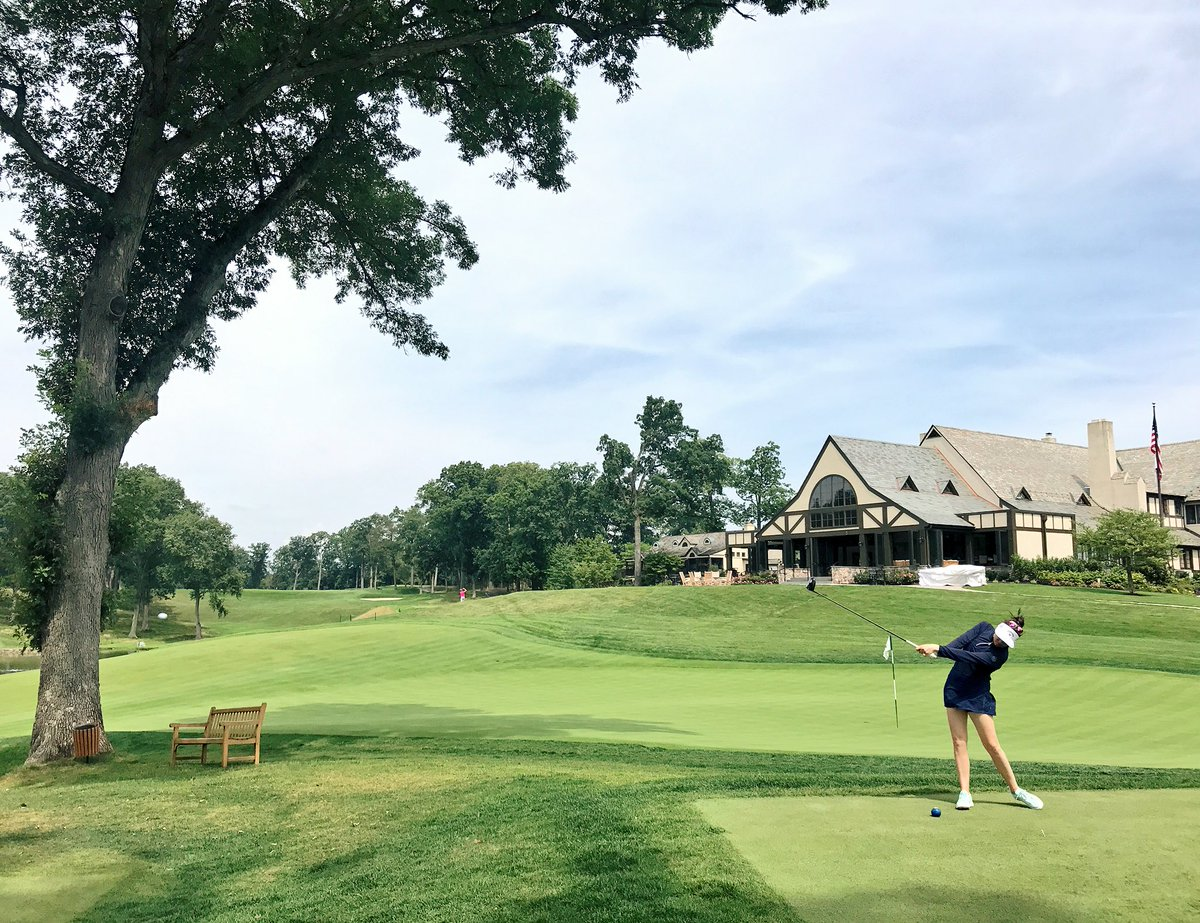
Morris County Golf Club

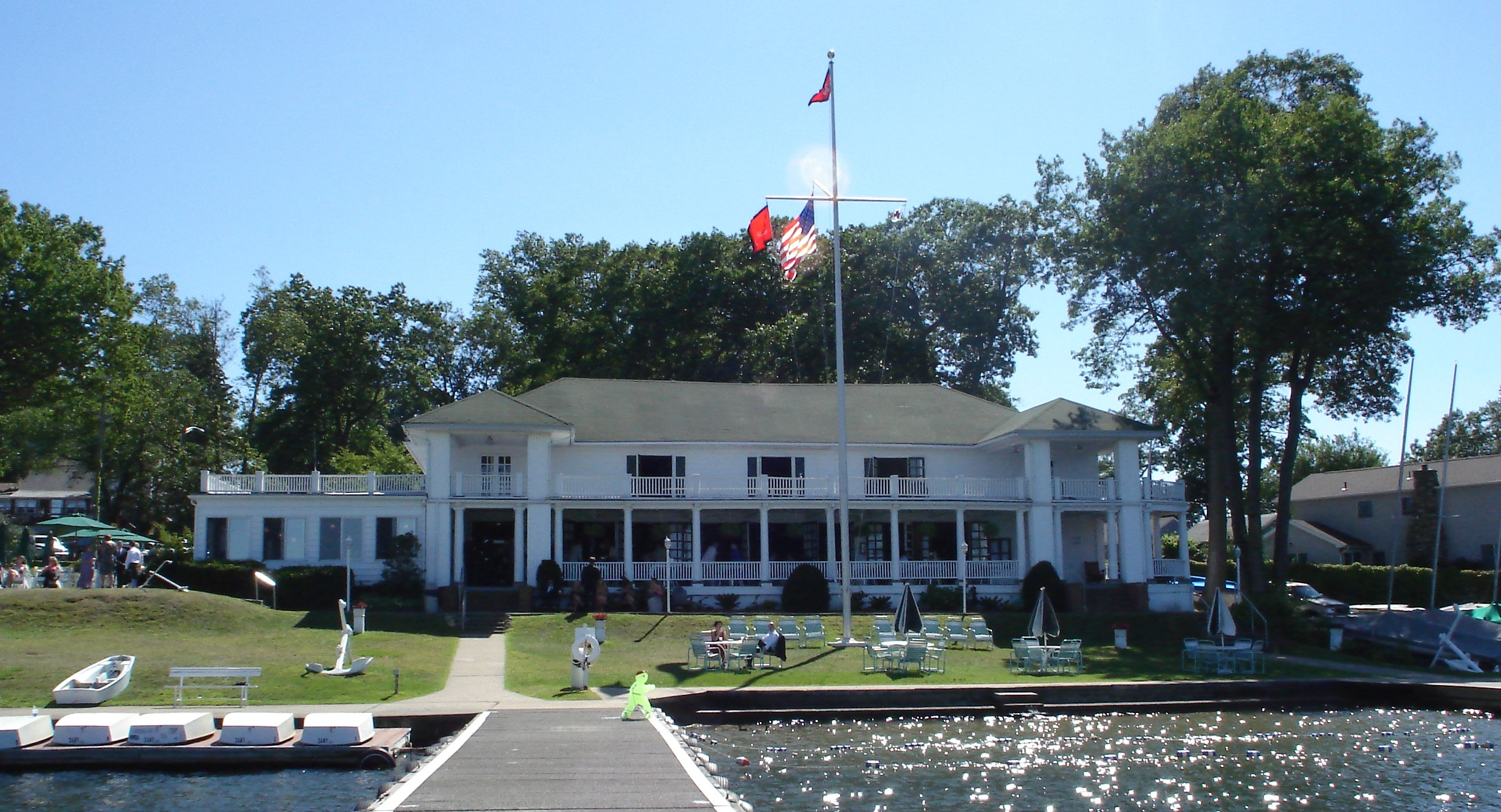
Lake Hopatcong Yacht Club

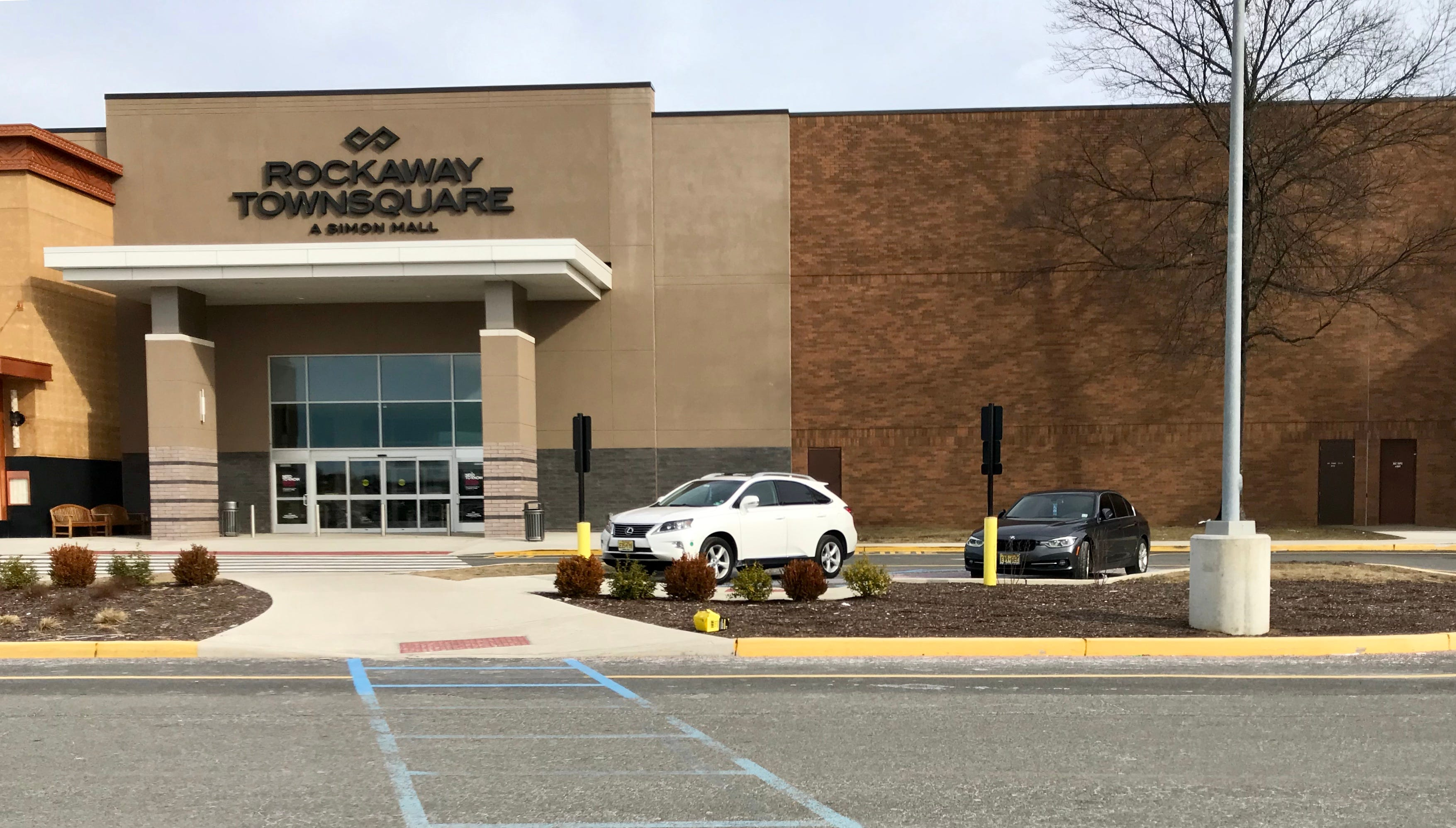
Rockaway Townsquare

The county's parks are under the administration of the Morris County Park Commission; established in 1956, it is the largest county park system in New Jersey with more than 20,000 acres (8,100 ha) of land under its management for recreational, leisure, and educational use. As of May 2022, it operates 38 facilities including outdoor parks, trails, a marina, an ice skating arena, a horse stable, a historical farm and an operating mill.

In March 1958, the Lewis Morris County Park in Morris Township became the first park dedicated by the MCPC, covering 350 acres (140 ha). As of 2021, it has expanded to 2,196 acres (889 ha) with 22.1 miles (35.6 km) of trails. The park was named for Lewis Morris, the first Colonial Governor of New Jersey. The second park acquisition was a donation in 1956 of 75 acres (30 ha) of land in Randolph now known as James Andrews Memorial Park, which has since been expanded to cover more than 580 acres (230 ha). Notably, Morristown National Historical Park became the country's first National Historical Park in 1933.

=== National protected areas ===
- Great Swamp National Wildlife Refuge (part)
- Morristown National Historical Park
- Troy Meadows

=== Other points of interest ===
- Morris County Golf Club, founded in 1894, was unique at the time in that it was established and operated by women. Two of the club's presidents have served as United States Golf Association presidents, which the club joined in 1895. The current course was designed in 1916 by architect Seth Raynor. The current clubhouse was built in 1919.
- Lake Hopatcong Yacht Club, established in 1905, the yacht club is located on the small peninsula of Bertrand Island along Lake Hopatcong. The Adirondack style clubhouse structure was listed on both the National and New Jersey registers of historic places in 1999.
- Rockaway Townsquare located in Rockaway Township is a super-regional mall anchored by Macy's, JCPenney, and Raymour & Flanigan with a gross leasable area of 1,248,000 square feet (115,900 m^{2}), placing it in the top ten among the largest shopping malls in New Jersey.

== Transportation ==
=== Roads and highways ===
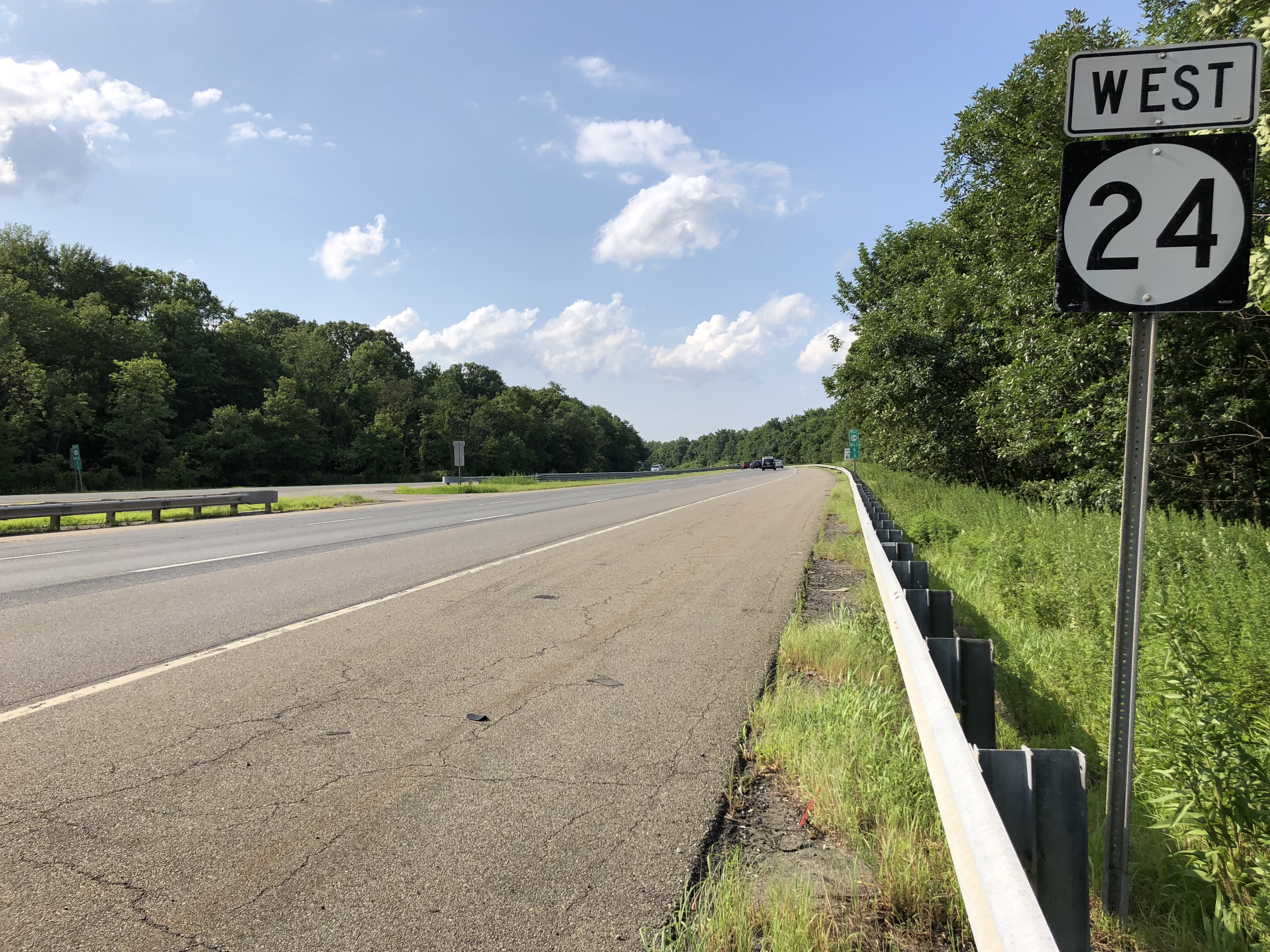
Route 24 westbound in Chatham

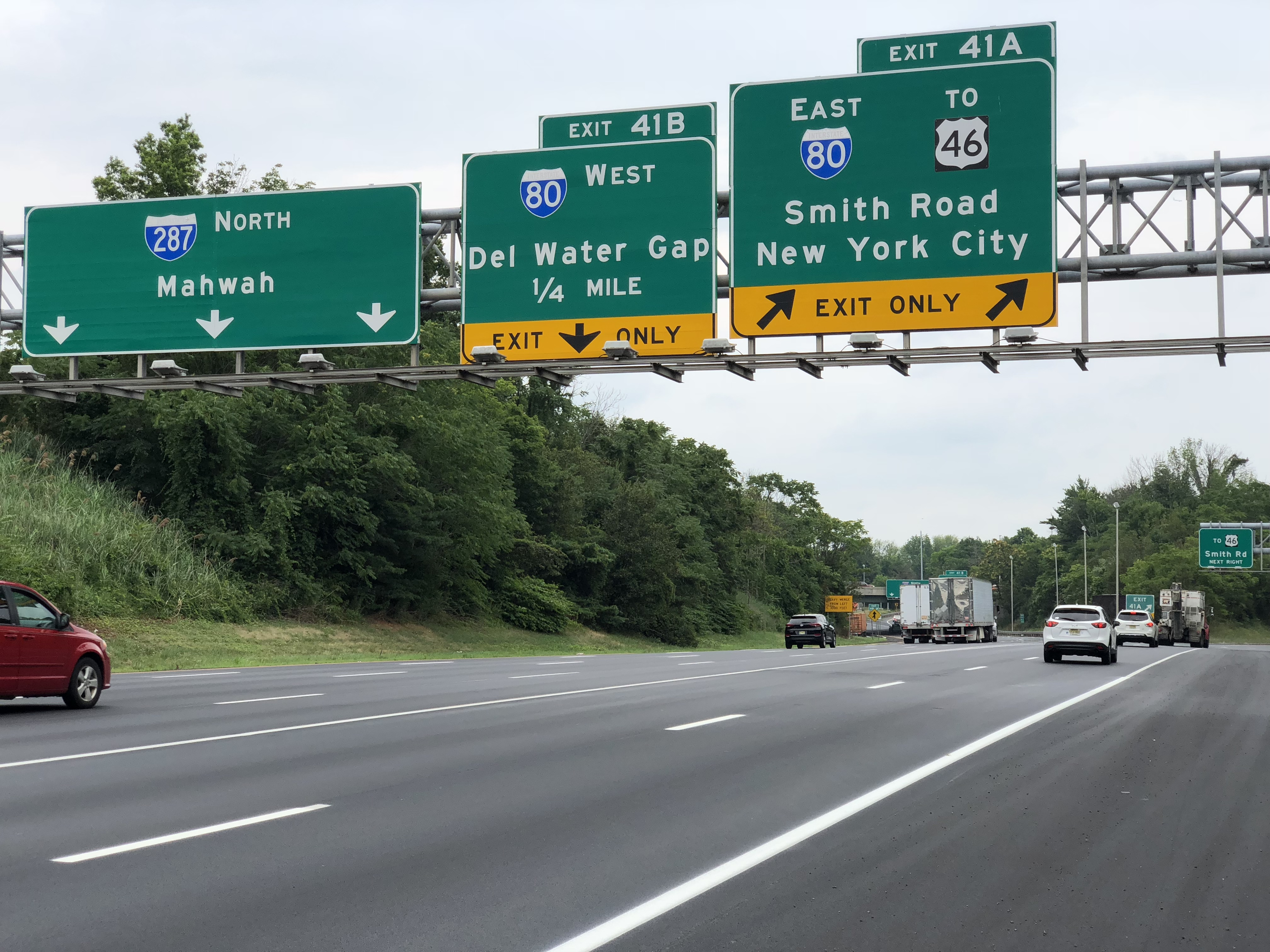
Interstate 287 northbound approaching Interstate 80 in Parsippany–Troy Hills

As of 2010, the county had a total of 2,527.39 miles (4,067.44 km) of roadways, of which 2,070.57 miles (3,332.26 km) are maintained by the local municipality, 295.54 miles (475.63 km) by Morris County and 161.28 miles (259.56 km) by the New Jersey Department of Transportation.

Morris County is served by several major roadways including:

- Interstate 80
- Interstate 280
- Interstate 287
- U.S. Route 46
- U.S. Route 202
- U.S. Route 206
- Route 10
- Route 15
- Route 23
- Route 24
- Route 53
- Route 124
- Route 159 (Only in Montville)
- Route 181 (Only in Jefferson)
- Route 183

=== Public transportation ===
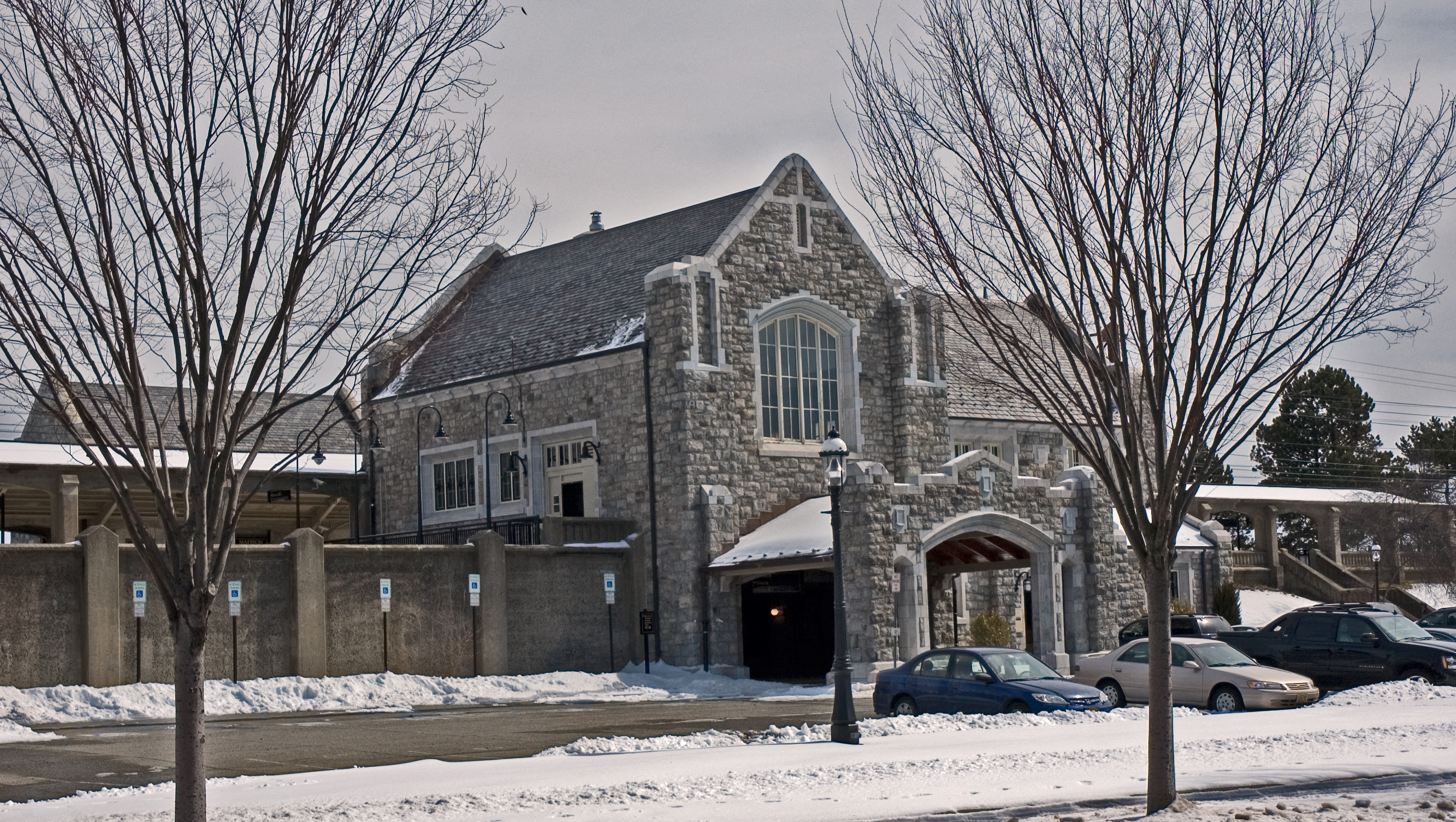
Madison Train Station

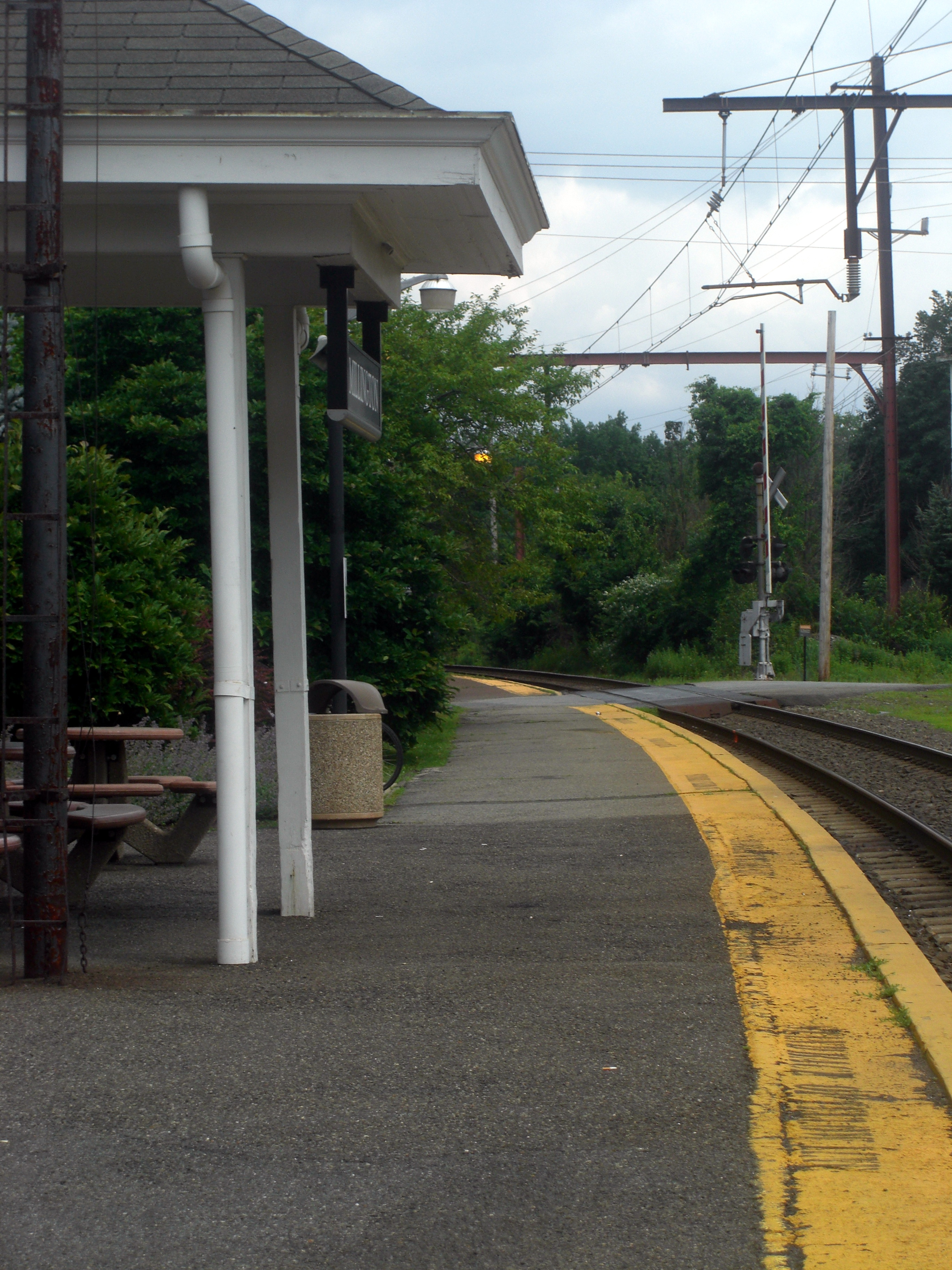
Millington Train Station

NJ Transit also provides rail service with Morris County via its Morris & Essex Lines and Montclair-Boonton Line to Hoboken Terminal and to New York City via its Midtown Direct service. Rail stations are located in the county providing electrified train service seven days a week from: Chatham, Madison, Convent Station, Morristown, Morris Plains, Denville, and Dover on NJ Transit's Morris & Essex Lines; electrified train service seven days a week from Gillette, Millington and Stirling on the Gladstone Branch; and diesel train service (weekdays only) from Mount Arlington, Lake Hopatcong, Netcong, Mount Olive, Mountain Lakes, Boonton, Towaco (Montville) and Lincoln Park.

Bus transportation is also offered by several carriers including Lakeland Bus Lines and NJ Transit.

=== Air ===
Morristown Municipal Airport is a general aviation reliever airport located 3 miles (4.8 km) east of downtown Morristown. Operated by DM Airports, Ltd, it is in the Whippany section of Hanover Township.

== Local media ==
- WMTR is an AM radio station at 1250 kHz is licensed to Morristown and features an oldies format.
- WDHA is an FM radio station (105.5 FM) broadcasting from Dover with their main studios in Cedar Knolls, featuring a rock format.
- WJSV radio and television (90.5 FM) is also in Morristown, the non-profit radio station of Morristown High School, which also has a television show which is shown on cable television, Colonial Corner.
- The Morristown Daily Record and The Star-Ledger and New Jersey Hills Media are published locally.
- Hometown Tales, a Public-access television cable TV show and podcast chronicling stories and urban legends from around the world, is loosely based in Morristown.
- Shop Morris County, the First Morris County Guide is a Resource for finding local events, restaurants, news, and more in Morris County, NJ.

== See also ==
- 2024 New Jersey drone sightings
- National Register of Historic Places listings in Morris County, New Jersey
- Sheep Hill Observatory
- Whippany River Watershed Action Committee
