= Tripucka =

Tripucka is a surname belonging to a family of professional athletes. Notable people with this surname include:

- Frank Tripucka (1927–2013), American football player who played in the NFL, CFL and AFL, father of Kelly
- Kelly Tripucka (born 1959), American retired basketball player who played in the NBA, son of Frank
- Travis Tripucka (born 1989), American football player in the NFL, son of Kelly
