= Peter Meinke =

American poet and author (born 1932)

- Born: 1932 (age 93–94); New York City, U.S.
- Education: Mountain Lakes High School; Hamilton College (BA); University of Michigan (MA); University of Minnesota (PhD)
- Occupations: Poet; author
- Spouse: Jeanne Clark
- Writing career
- Notable awards: Flannery O'Connor Award for Short Fiction (1986)

Peter Meinke (born 1932 in Brooklyn, New York) is an American poet and author. He has published 18 books of poems and short stories. The Piano Tuner, won the 1986 Flannery O'Connor Award for Short Fiction. His poetry has received many awards, including two NEA Fellowships and three prizes from the Poetry Society of America. His work has appeared in The New Yorker, Atlantic Monthly, Poetry, Kalliope, A journal of women's art and literature and other magazines. He is the current poet laureate of Florida and was appointed on June 15, 2015.

== Biography ==
Raised in Mountain Lakes, New Jersey, Meinke graduated in 1950 from Mountain Lakes High School and was inducted into its hall of fame in 2016. After receiving his BA from Hamilton College, Meinke served for two years in the Army. He later earned an MA at the University of Michigan and a PhD at the University of Minnesota.

Meinke and his wife, the artist Jeanne Clark, have lived in St. Petersburg, Florida, since 1966. For 27 years, Meinke was a professor at Eckerd College, where he was a director of the EC Writing Workshop. In February 2004, he was inducted as a foundation member into the Eckerd College Phi Beta Kappa chapter, Zeta of Florida. He also served on the faculty of the Eckerd College's Third Annual Writers in Paradise Conference in January 2007. From 2003 through 2005, he held the Darden Chair in Creative Writing at Old Dominion University.

== Works ==
Meinke's published books include:

- Unheard Music: Stories (2007)
- The Contracted World: New & More Selected Poems (2006)
- Zinc Fingers: Poems A to Z (2000)
- The Shape of Poetry: A Practical Guide to Writing Poetry (1999)
- Scars (1996)
- Campocorto (Sow's ear) (1996)
- The Piano Tuner: Stories (1994)
- Liquid Paper (1992)
- Far from Home (1988)
- Night Watch on the Chesapeake (1987)
- Underneath the Lantern (1986)
- Trying to Surprise God (1981)
- The Rat Poems: Or, Rats Live On No Evil Star (1978)
- The Night Train & The Golden Bird (1977)
- Lines from Neuchatel (1974)
- Very Seldom Animals (1969)
- Howard Nemerov (1968)
- The Legend of Larry, the Lizard (1968)
