= Boonton Township School District =

School district in Morris County, New Jersey, US

Address
- 11 Valley Road Boonton Township, Morris County, New Jersey, 07005; United States
- Coordinates: 40.925625°N 74.430973°W

District information
- Grades: PreK-8
- Superintendent: Ken Frattini
- Business administrator: John T. Murray II
- Schools: 1

Students and staff
- Enrollment: 414 (as of 2023–24)
- Faculty: 43.0 FTEs
- Student–teacher ratio: 9.6:1

Other information
- District Factor Group: I
- Website: www.btrvs.org
Ind.	Per pupil	District spending	Rank (*)	K-8 average	%± vs. average
1A	Total Spending	$18,259	30	$18,891	−3.3%
1	Budgetary Cost	14,793	38	14,159	4.5%
2	Classroom Instruction	9,642	50	8,659	11.4%
6	Support Services	1,463	6	2,167	−32.5%
8	Administrative Cost	1,904	59	1,547	23.1%
10	Operations & Maintenance	1,518	29	1,612	−5.8%
13	Extracurricular Activities	195	51	104	87.5%
16	Median Teacher Salary	65,510	42	61,136
Data from NJDoE 2014 Taxpayers' Guide to Education Spending. *Of K-8 districts with 401-750 students. Lowest spending=1; Highest=64

The Boonton Township School District is a community public school district that serves students in pre-kindergarten through eighth grade from Boonton Township, in Morris County, in the U.S. state of New Jersey.

As of the 2023–24 school year, the district, comprised of one school, had an enrollment of 414 students and 43.0 classroom teachers (on an FTE basis), for a student–teacher ratio of 9.6:1.

The district had been classified by the New Jersey Department of Education as being in District Factor Group "I", the second-highest of eight groupings. District Factor Groups organize districts statewide to allow comparison by common socioeconomic characteristics of the local districts. From lowest socioeconomic status to highest, the categories are A, B, CD, DE, FG, GH, I and J.

For ninth through twelfth grades, public school students attend Mountain Lakes High School, in Mountain Lakes as part of a sending/receiving relationship agreement. As of the 2023–24 school year, the high school had an enrollment of 550 students and 58.0 classroom teachers (on an FTE basis), for a student–teacher ratio of 9.5:1.

== History ==
Prior to 1991, high school students had attended Boonton High School.

== School ==
Rockaway Valley School had an enrollment of 407 students in grades PreK-8 as of the 2023–24 school year.

- Ken Frattini, principal

== Administration ==
Core members of the district's administration are:

- Ken Frattini, superintendent
- John T. Murray II, business administrator and board secretary

== Board of education ==
The district's board of education is comprised of nine members who set policy and oversee the fiscal and educational operation of the district through its administration. As a Type II school district, the board's trustees are elected directly by voters to serve three-year terms of office on a staggered basis, with three seats up for election each year held (since 2012) as part of the November general election. The board appoints a superintendent to oversee the district's day-to-day operations and a business administrator to supervise the business functions of the district.
