= Tony Sorrentino (American football) =

American football player and coach (born 1988)

Arizona Cardinals
- Title: Wide receivers coach

Personal information
- Born: June 28, 1983 (age 43); Parsippany, New Jersey, U.S.

Career information
- Position: Wide receiver (No. 18)
- High school: Mountain Lakes (Mountain Lakes, New Jersey)
- College: TCNJ (2001–2004)

Career history
- TCNJ (2007) Outside linebackers coach; Minnesota (2009) Offensive quality control coach; Minnesota (2010) Quarterbacks coach; Miami (FL) (2011) Offensive graduate assistant; TCNJ (2012) Quarterbacks coach & pass game coordinator; Jacksonville Jaguars (2013–2015) Assistant wide receivers coach & offensive quality control coach; Tennessee (2017) Offensive analyst; Florida Atlantic (2018) Director of operations; Northern Illinois (2019–2021) Passing game coordinator & wide receivers coach; Minnesota Vikings (2022–2025) Assistant wide receivers coach; Arizona Cardinals (2026–present) Wide receivers coach

Anthony Sorrentino (born June 28, 1983) is an American professional football coach who is the wide receivers coach for the Arizona Cardinals of the National Football League (NFL). He previously served as the assistant wide receivers coach for the Minnesota Vikings from 2022 to 2025.

Sorrentino played college football at TCNJ as a wide receiver from 2001 to 2004 and has previously served as an assistant coach for The College of New Jersey (TCNJ), the University of Minnesota, the University of Miami, Jacksonville Jaguars, University of Tennessee, Florida Atlantic University, Northern Illinois University and Minnesota Vikings.

== Early life ==
Sorrentino was born on June 28, 1983, in Parsippany, New Jersey. He is the son of Anthony and Susan Sorrentino. His father, Anthony Sr., was a prominent athlete and team co-captain at Trenton State (now TCNJ) in the late 1960s.

Sorrentino attended Mountain Lakes High School, where he was a standout three-sport athlete in football, basketball, and lacrosse, graduating in 2001. He served as a football team captain and earned first-team all-area, all-county, and all-conference honors. In his senior year, he was named the school's Athlete of the Year after leading the lacrosse team to a 19–1 record and a Gibbs Division Championship.

=== College ===
Sorrentino attended The College of New Jersey (TCNJ), where he was a four-year letterman at wide receiver from 2001 to 2004. As a senior in 2004, he earned NJAC All-Conference Honorable Mention honors after helping the Lions to a 7–2 record. During his junior season in 2003, he recorded a career-high 316 receiving yards. While balancing his playing career, Sorrentino gained early professional exposure through an internship with the Houston Texans. He graduated from TCNJ in 2005 with a Bachelor of Science in health and physical education and later returned to the university to earn a Master of Science in exercise science in 2012.

== Coaching career ==
=== Early career ===
Sorrentino began his coaching journey in the New Jersey high school ranks with positions at Morristown Beard School, West Essex High School and Montville Township High School. He moved into collegiate coaching with stints as an offensive quality control coach and quarterbacks coach at the University of Minnesota (2009–2010), a graduate assistant at the University of Miami (2011), and offensive quality control at the University of Tennessee (2017). He also spent time as the director of football operations at Florida Atlantic University under Lane Kiffin.

=== Jacksonville Jaguars ===
In 2013, Sorrentino began his NFL career began with the Jacksonville Jaguars, where he served as an assistant wide receivers coach and offensive quality control coach. During this period, he was instrumental in the development of Allen Robinson, who earned a Pro Bowl nod in 2015, and Allen Hurns, who became the youngest undrafted player since the 1970 merger to record 1,000 receiving yards and 10 touchdowns in a single season.

=== Northern Illinois ===
Between 2019 and 2021, Sorrentino served as passing game coordinator and wide receivers coach for Northern Illinois University Huskies, which won 2021 MAC Championship.

=== Minnesota Vikings ===
Sorrentino joined the Minnesota Vikings in 2022. He has helped coach Justin Jefferson during his 1,809-yard Offensive Player of the Year season and mentored Jordan Addison through a standout rookie campaign. In 2024, he helped the Vikings' wide receiver room become only the third in franchise history to feature three players with at least six receiving touchdowns each.

=== Arizona Cardinals ===
On February 11, 2026, Sorrentino was hired by the Arizona Cardinals as the team's wide receivers coach under new head coach Mike LaFleur.

== Personal life ==
Sorrentino and his wife, Kara, have three children: a daughter named Marea and two sons, Anthony Jr. and Luca. Sorrentino is an active advocate for Angelman Syndrome awareness, a cause he champions through the NFL's "My Cause My Cleats" initiative in honor of his nephew, Cameron.
