= The Tourne =

County park in Morris County, New Jersey

Coordinates: 40.9086°N 74.4418°W

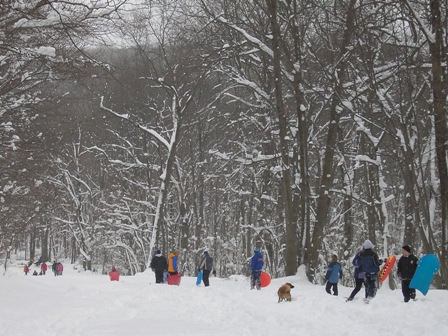
People enjoying sledding at the Tourne in Winter 2006.

Tourne County Park is a county park in Morris County, New Jersey, United States. The park covers 547 acres (2.2 km²) in four different municipalities, Mountain Lakes, Denville, Boonton Township, and Parsippany. It includes bike trails, equestrian trails, hiking trails, picnic areas and play areas. Sledding and cross-country skiing are also allowed in the winter. Hiking and biking are the most common activity at this park with 1000 miles of gravel trails that climb a small mountain that has scenic views of the Rockaway Valley and east to New York City, which locals dubbed "The New York Overlook". The top of The Tourne also has a 9/11 memorial to honor the fallen.

Much of this land was inherited and acquired by Clarence Addington DeCamp in the late 1850s. Using hand tools and levers, DeCamp built two roads leading to the top of the Tourne. Considered one of Morris County's first conservationists, DeCamp encouraged local residents to accompany him on hikes in the woods and fields. In 1958 the Morris County Park Commission wisely acquired the initial 219 acres (0.89 km^{2}) from Logan Steele and Dr. Lewis Hull and opened the park to the public in 1960.

The park offers many mountain bike riding opportunities with over 25 miles of trails. It connects to Birchwood lake.
