= Mario Vasquez =

American public administrator

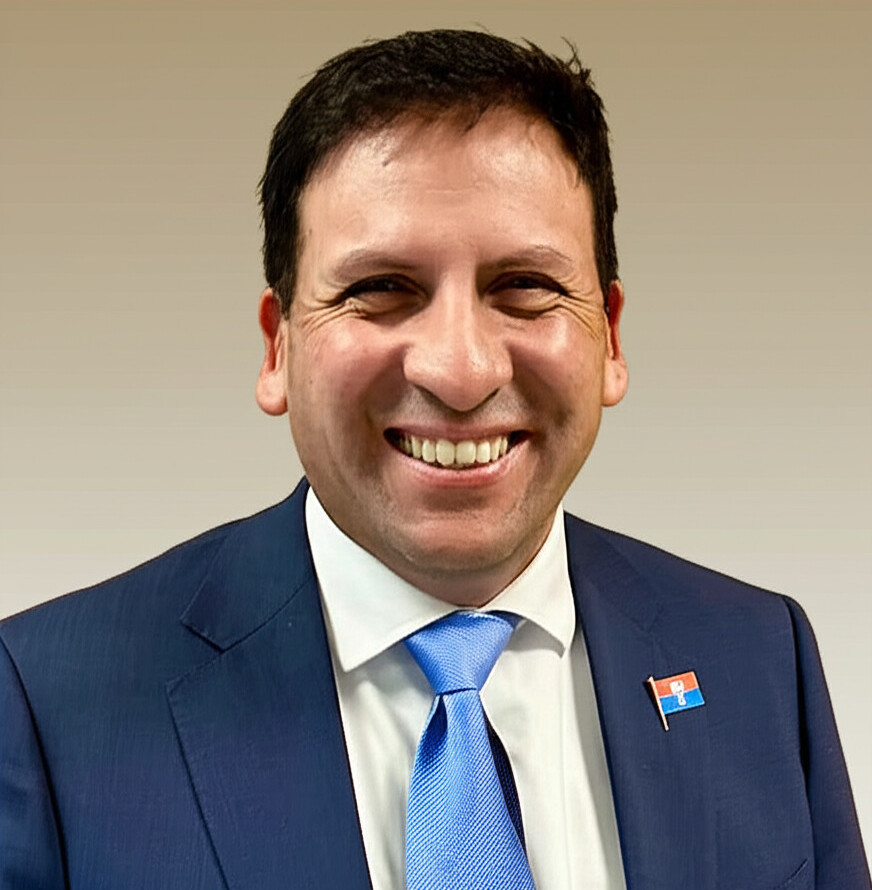
- Vasquez in 2025

16th City Manager of Kansas City, Missouri
- Incumbent
- Assumed office May 8, 2025
- Preceded by: Brian Platt

Personal details
- Born: 1970 or 1971 (age 55–56) Bolivia
- Education: University of Wisconsin–Eau Claire; University of Wisconsin–Madison; University of Missouri–Kansas City
- Occupation: Public administrator, city planner
- Website: kcmo.gov

Mario Vasquez is an American public administrator who became the 16th City Manager of Kansas City, Missouri, in May 2025. His appointment by the City Council, on the recommendation of Mayor Quinton Lucas, made him the first Latino to permanently hold this position. His career in Kansas City's government spans three decades of extensive experience, having previously served as Assistant City Manager and Director of City Planning and Development. As City Manager, he oversees a $2.5-billion-dollar budget, a workforce of nearly 5,000 employees, and major city initiatives including public safety, economic development, and preparations for the 2026 FIFA World Cup.

His selection followed an expedited nine-week search process, initiated after the dismissal of his predecessor, Brian Platt. This swift process ultimately focused on three internal candidates with deep ties to Kansas City, contrasting with the yearlong national search that had led to Platt's hiring in 2020.

== Early life and education ==
Mario Vasquez was born in Bolivia. During what he described as "a time of economic distress and turmoil" there, his family immigrated to Wisconsin. In 1987, he played varsity soccer at Oregon High School and in 1989 became a conference tennis champion at Monona Grove High School. He graduated from a suburban Madison, Wisconsin high school in 1989.

He earned a Bachelor's degree in Economics from the University of Wisconsin–Eau Claire in 1995. He earned a Master of Science degree in Urban and Regional Planning from the University of Wisconsin–Madison in 1996. He earned a second Master's degree, in Entrepreneurial Real Estate, from the University of Missouri–Kansas City (UMKC) in 2014, while working for the city.

== Career ==
=== City planner ===
Vasquez began his public service as an entry-level planner for Kansas City in 1997. In 2005, he was promoted to Project Manager. For 17 years, he was involved in numerous projects, including the city's acquisition and redevelopment of the Linwood Shopping Center on the East Side.

In 2022, he was appointed Assistant City Manager. From August 2023 to May 2025, he also concurrently was Director of City Planning and Development. As Assistant City Manager, he oversaw more than $600 million in public-private development initiatives and capital projects. He led initiatives in comprehensive planning, strategic infrastructure investment, and catalytic economic development. As Director of City Planning and Development, the department expanded project services, reduced plan review timelines, increased staff in the permitting division, and reduced inspection delays. He became recognized for his collaborative approach and understanding of Kansas City's housing, infrastructure, and development landscape. A significant undertaking during this period is the project launch of South Loop Park above a section of Interstate 670. Vasquez acknowledged the complexities, stating, "We're building the plane as we're flying it", and emphasized the initial goal of completing the project by the 2026 FIFA World Cup.

=== City Manager ===
==== Appointment ====
The search for a new city manager was "expedited", concluding just nine weeks after the suspension and subsequent dismissal of former City Manager Brian Platt. This rapid timeline was a departure from the yearlong national search that had led to Platt's hiring in 2020. It was a limited, national search yielding a pool of 40 applicants because the position is only guaranteed until the next mayoral election in 2027. Although the process was open to external candidates, the final decision narrowed to three individuals with extensive experience at Kansas City City Hall: Vasquez, then Director of City Planning and Development and Assistant City Manager; Kimiko Gilmore, then Interim City Manager; and Patrick Klein, the former Director of Aviation who had retired in 2023. This was called a "comprehensive selection process", which included two straw-poll votes by the City Council and public interviews with the finalists on May 1, 2025.

Vasquez was appointed as Kansas City's 16th City Manager on May 8, 2025. The Kansas City Council approved Mayor Quinton Lucas's recommendation, at an annual salary of $265,000, with an 11-2 vote. The two dissenting votes were cast by Councilmembers Ryana Parks-Shaw and Darrell Curls, both representing the 5th district.

At age 54, and already with 28 years of experience in Kansas City government, he became the first Latino to permanently hold the position of City Manager in Kansas City. He said, "I was asked a question not long ago, 'how did you get to be the guy that people always look to for solutions?' I just said, I raised my hand, I worked my ass off, and that is what it takes." The Kansas City Star said "Vasquez choked up as he described seeing one of his former employees rise to fill one of his [own past] jobs". Vasquez likened his mentality to that of a coach: "You need to guide, you need to encourage, motivate, and provide corrective action". Of his existing tenure, he said, "I would say I'm ready to roll my sleeves, but my sleeves are already rolled up, so I'm ready to go forward". First District council member Nathan Willett commented on Vasquez's immigrant background: "Mario's path to city manager is the definition of the American Dream".

==== Tenure ====
As city manager, Mario Vasquez oversees a municipal government with a $2.5 billion budget and nearly 5,000 employees. His responsibilities include ensuring city services operate efficiently, advising the Mayor and City Council, appointing department directors, preparing the annual city budget, enforcing municipal laws, and coordinating city operations and programs. The City Manager's Office leads coordination for large-scale events.

Upon taking office, Vasquez identified preparations for the 2026 FIFA World Cup as a major priority, expressing the need for the city to be ready for an anticipated 650,000 tourists and to fill key emergency management and fire department vacancies. Other significant responsibilities include overseeing the design and construction of a new municipal jail, promoting city-wide economic development with a focus on growth in suburban areas and on reinvestment in historically neglected neighborhoods, and managing the city's finances, which includes preparing for the 2026 renewal of Kansas City's 1% earnings tax. He intends to improve city services and oversee an audit of the communications office for transparency.

== Personal life ==
In the 1980s, Mario Vasquez moved from Bolivia to the United States with his family. He has stated that Kansas City became "my life and my family".
