= Mountain Lakes Schools =

School district in Morris County, New Jersey, US

Address
- 96 Powerville Road Mountain Lakes, Morris County, New Jersey, 07046; United States
- Coordinates: 40.886022°N 74.453905°W

District information
- Grades: PreK-12
- Superintendent: Brad Siegel
- Business administrator: Alex Ferreira
- Schools: 4

Students and staff
- Enrollment: 1,348 (as of 2020–21)
- Faculty: 146.7 FTEs
- Student–teacher ratio: 9.2:1

Other information
- District Factor Group: J
- Website: www.mlschools.org
Ind.	Per pupil	District spending	Rank (*)	K-12 average	%± vs. average
1A	Total Spending	$23,989	48	$18,891	27.0%
1	Budgetary Cost	20,102	49	14,783	36.0%
2	Classroom Instruction	11,953	49	8,763	36.4%
6	Support Services	3,400	45	2,392	42.1%
8	Administrative Cost	1,845	38	1,485	24.2%
10	Operations & Maintenance	2,268	48	1,783	27.2%
13	Extracurricular Activities	621	40	268	131.7%
16	Median Teacher Salary	79,732	48	64,043
Data from NJDoE 2014 Taxpayers' Guide to Education Spending. *Of K-12 districts with up to 1,800 students. Lowest spending=1; Highest=49

The Mountain Lakes Schools is a comprehensive community public school district that serves students in pre-kindergarten through twelfth grade from Mountain Lakes, in Morris County, in the U.S. state of New Jersey.

As of the 2020–21 school year, the district, comprising four schools, had an enrollment of 1,348 students and 146.7 classroom teachers (on an FTE basis), for a student–teacher ratio of 9.2:1.

The district is classified by the New Jersey Department of Education as being in District Factor Group "J", the highest of eight groupings. District Factor Groups organize districts statewide to allow comparison by common socioeconomic characteristics of the local districts. From lowest socioeconomic status to highest, the categories are A, B, CD, DE, FG, GH, I and J.

Students from Boonton Township attend the district's high school as part of a sending/receiving relationship.

== Awards and recognition ==
Briarcliff Middle School was one of nine public schools recognized in 2017 as Blue Ribbon Schools by the United States Department of Education.

The district's high school was the 7th-ranked public high school in New Jersey out of 328 schools statewide in New Jersey Monthly magazine's September 2012 cover story on the state's "Top Public High Schools", after being ranked 9th in 2010 out of 322 schools listed.

== Schools ==
Schools in the district (with 2020–21 enrollment data from the National Center for Education Statistics) are:

Elementary schools

- Wildwood Elementary School with 428 students in grades K-5
  - Patrick Higgins, principal

Middle school

- Briarcliff Middle School with 281 students in grades 6-8
  - Erik Carlson, principal

High school

- Mountain Lakes High School with 641 students in grades 9-12
  - Rick Mangili, principal

Ungraded

- Lake Drive School serves as a regional school for deaf and hard of hearing students from birth through high school, with students from nearly 100 communities in 12 New Jersey counties. with 57 students in grades PreK-8
  - Julie Lazeration, principal

== Administration ==
Core members of the district's administration are:

- Brad Siegel, superintendent
- Alex Ferreira, business administrator and board secretary

== Board of education ==
The district's board of education is comprised of nine members who set policy and oversee the fiscal and educational operation of the district through its administration. As a Type II school district, the board's trustees are elected directly by voters to serve three-year terms of office on a staggered basis, with three seats up for election each year held (since 2012) as part of the November general election. A tenth represented is appointed by Boonton Township to represent that district's interests. The board appoints a superintendent to oversee the district's day-to-day operations and a business administrator to supervise the business functions of the district.
