= Travis Tripucka =

American football player (born 1989)

Profile
- Position: Long snapper

Personal information
- Born: May 3, 1989 (age 37); Boonton Township, New Jersey
- Listed height: 6 ft 1 in (1.85 m)
- Listed weight: 240 lb (109 kg)

Career information
- High school: Mountain Lakes (Mountain Lakes, New Jersey)
- College: Massachusetts
- NFL draft: 2012: undrafted

Career history
- St. Louis Rams (2012)*; New York Jets (2013)*
- * Offseason or practice squad member only
- Stats at Pro Football Reference

Travis Tripucka (born May 3, 1989) is an American former football long snapper. He was signed by the St. Louis Rams as an undrafted free agent in 2012. He played college football at Massachusetts. His cousin Shane Tripucka was a punter for the Los Angeles Chargers and is currently an NFL Free Agent. He played for the XFL LA Wildcats in 2020.

== Early life ==
Raised in Boonton Township, New Jersey, Tripucka attended Mountain Lakes High School. He was named to the New Jersey First-team All-Area and Second-team All-State honors after his senior year. He was selected for the most improved freshman award. He also played lacrosse while at high school in which he was a member of the 2004-05 Morris County champion and a Group 1 State finalist team.

== College career ==
Tripucka played college football at Massachusetts, where he also played lacrosse in his freshman and sophomore years.

== Professional career ==
=== St. Louis Rams ===
In May 2012, Tripucka signed with the St. Louis Rams as an undrafted free agent. On August 27, 2012, he was released.

=== New York Jets ===
On January 3, 2013, Tripucka was signed by the New York Jets to a future/reserve contract. He was released on June 17, 2013.

== Personal life ==
Tripucka is the son of Janice and former two-time NBA All-Star Kelly Tripucka who played basketball professionally from 1981 to 1991, as well as the grandson of former NFL (and CFL) quarterback Frank Tripucka. He has a sister, Reagan, and a brother, Jake, who is a midfielder with the Charlotte Hounds. He is also the nephew of standout basketball player Todd Tripucka and Chris Tripucka, former wide receiver of Doug Flutie at Boston College.
