= Mountain Lakes High School =

High school in Morris County, New Jersey, US

Location
- 96 Powerville Road; Mountain Lakes, Morris County, New Jersey 07046; United States; 40.894502°N 74.425635°W

Information
- Type: Public high school
- Motto: Tradition of Honest Excellence
- Established: 1936 (Briarcliff Building), 1959 (present building)
- School district: Mountain Lakes Schools
- NCES School ID: 341101004416
- Principal: Richard Mangili"
- Faculty: 56.0 FTEs
- Grades: 9-12
- Enrollment: 546 (as of 2024–25)
- Student to teacher ratio: 9.8:1
- Colors: Orange and blue
- Athletics conference: Northwest Jersey Athletic Conference (general); North Jersey Super Football Conference (football)
- Newspaper: The Mountaineer
- Website: hs.mlschools.org

Mountain Lakes High School is a four-year comprehensive public high school that serves students in ninth through twelfth grade from Mountain Lakes, in Morris County, in the U.S. state of New Jersey, operating as the lone secondary school of the Mountain Lakes Schools. The school has been accredited by the Middle States Association of Colleges and Schools Commission on Elementary and Secondary Schools since 1940.

Students from Boonton Township attend the school as part of a sending/receiving relationship with the Boonton Township School District.

As of the 2024–25 school year, the school had an enrollment of 546 students and 56.0 classroom teachers (on an FTE basis), for a student–teacher ratio of 9.8:1. There were 10 students (1.8% of enrollment) eligible for free lunch and 1 (0.2% of students) eligible for reduced-cost lunch.

== Awards, recognition and rankings ==
The school was ranked 19th in a study by public high school in New Jersey out of 339 schools statewide in New Jersey Monthly magazine's September 2014 cover story on the state's "Top Public High Schools", using a new ranking methodology. The school had been ranked 7th in the state of 328 schools in 2012, after being ranked 9th in 2010 out of 322 schools listed. The magazine ranked the school 4th in 2008 out of 316 schools. The school was ranked 5th in the magazine's September 2006 issue, which included 316 schools across the state. Schooldigger.com ranked the school 28th out of 381 public high schools statewide in its 2011 rankings (a decrease of 7 positions from the 2010 ranking) which were based on the combined percentage of students classified as proficient or above proficient on the mathematics (94.6%) and language arts literacy (97.9%) components of the High School Proficiency Assessment (HSPA).

In the 2011 "Ranking America's High Schools" issue by The Washington Post, the school was ranked 16th in New Jersey and 679th nationwide. In Newsweek's May 22, 2007, issue, ranking the country's top high schools, Mountain Lakes High School was listed in 3rd place, the 2nd-highest ranked school in New Jersey.

In its 2013 report on "America's Best High Schools", The Daily Beast ranked the school 538th in the nation among participating public high schools and 44th among schools in New Jersey. The school was ranked 207th in the nation and 17th in New Jersey on the list of "America's Best High Schools 2012" prepared by The Daily Beast / Newsweek, with rankings based primarily on graduation rate, matriculation rate for college and number of Advanced Placement / International Baccalaureate courses taken per student, with lesser factors based on average scores on the SAT / ACT, average AP/IB scores and the number of AP/IB courses available to students.

In 2013, a Mountain Lakes High School quiz bowl team won the Tri-State and New Jersey championships of MSG Varsity's TV show, The Challenge.

== Athletics ==
The Mountain Lakes High School Lakers compete in the Northwest Jersey Athletic Conference which is comprised of public and private high schools in Morris, Sussex and Warren counties in northwestern New Jersey, and operates under the jurisdiction of the New Jersey State Interscholastic Athletic Association (NJSIAA), having been established following a reorganization of sports leagues in Northern New Jersey by the NJSIAA Prior to the 2010 realignment, the school had been part of the Colonial Hills Conference, which included schools in Essex, Morris and Somerset counties. With 500 students in grades 10-12, the school was classified by the NJSIAA for the 2019–20 school year as Group II for most athletic competition purposes, which included schools with an enrollment of 486 to 758 students in that grade range. The football team competes in the American Blue division of the North Jersey Super Football Conference, which includes 112 schools competing in 20 divisions, making it the nation's biggest football-only high school sports league. The school was classified by the NJSIAA as Group I North for football for 2024–2026, which included schools with 254 to 474 students.

The school participates as the host school / lead agency in a joint ice hockey team with Boonton High School. The co-op program operates under agreements scheduled to expire at the end of the 2023–24 school year.

Mountain Lakes High School's athletic program features its football, lacrosse and swimming programs.

=== ShopRite Cup ===
The school was recognized in 2005–06 with the ShopRite cup for overall athletic achievement based on first-place finishes in girls' cross-country, boys' lacrosse and boys' swimming; second place in boys' golf; third place in girls' basketball, field hockey (tie) and girls' swimming (tie); plus bonus points for having no disqualifications in any of the three sports seasons.

=== Basketball ===
The boys' basketball team won the Group I state championship in 1962 (defeating Dunellen High School in the final game of the tournament) and 1969 (vs. Ridgefield Memorial High School). The 1962 team finished the season with a 25–0 record after taking the Group I title with an 88–66 win against Dunellen in the tournament finals played in front of some 3,500 at Delaware Valley Garden. The team won the 1969 Group I title with a 76–44 win against Ridgefield in the championship game.

In 2006, the girls' basketball team won North I, Group I state sectional title, edging Pascack Hills High School 43–42 in the tournament final.

=== Field hockey ===
The field hockey team won the North I Group I state sectional championship in 1999, 2005, 2011 and 2013.

=== Tennis ===
The boys' tennis team won the Group I / II state championship in 1970 (vs Haddonfield Memorial High School), 1971 (vs. Glen Rock High School), 1972 (vs. Metuchen High School), 1973 (vs. Leonia High School), 1974 (vs. Shore Regional High School), and won the Group I title in 1988 (vs. Metuchen), 1989 (vs. Haddonfield), 1995 and 1996 (vs. Arthur P. Schalick High School both years) and 2004 (vs. Point Pleasant Boro High School). The team won the overall state championship in 1962 (vs. River Dell High School), 1963 (vs. Ridgewood High School), 1964 (vs. Kearny High School), 1965 (vs. Montclair High School), 1971 (vs. Christian Brothers Academy) and 1972 (vs. Ramapo); the program's 10 state championships are tied for ninth most in the state, the six Tournament of Champions titles are tied for fourth most and the five consecutive titles from 1970 to 1974 is tied for fifth longest.

The girls' tennis team won the Group I state title in 1999 (vs. Rumson-Fair Haven Regional High School in the tournament finals) and 2018 (vs. Shore Regional High School). The 1999 team won the Group I title at Mercer County Park, defeating Pitman High School 4 1/2-1/2 in the semifinals and then knocking off Rumson-Fair Haven 5-0 in the championships. The 2018 team defeated Kinnelon High School 3-2 in the semifinals and went on to win the finals against Shore Regional 4-1.

=== Football ===
The football team (the "Herd") won the North I Group I state sectional championship in 1974, 1976, 2002, 2008, 2009, 2022 and 2023; and the North II Group II title in both 2013 and 2014. The "Herd" program was founded and developed in 1966 by Doug Wilkins, who served for 44 years as the team's head coach and made the program into one of the most successful in the state; his 328 wins ranks him among the state's top five in victories, in addition to his winning eight state championships, including two undefeated state championship teams in the 1970s. The 1976 team finished the season with an 11–0 record after winning the North II Group I with a 24–14 win against Clifford Scott High School in the championship game.

During the years 2000–2010 the team's record was 99–15, which included a 23-game win streak from Thanksgiving 2001 until late November 2003, as well as a 36-game win streak that began at the start of the 2008 season and continued until a loss in the 2010 state sectional final against Wallington High School. In 2002 the football program won the North II, Group I state sectional title over archrival Boonton High School by a score of 23–6 to cap a perfect 12–0 season and earn the program's first state title since 1976. In 2008, the football team won the North I Group I state championship vs. Glen Rock High School at Giants Stadium on December 5, 2008, by a score of 35–21 and finished with an overall record of 12–0. Coach Wilkins won his 300th career game in October 2007, in addition to having won over 22 CHC titles, a streak of 20 consecutive seasons of making the NJSIAA playoffs, and did not have a losing season since 1984, retiring in 2010 after having won 328 games and a seventh state championship in his 44 seasons with the school's football program. The team won the North I Group I title in 2022 with a 16-6 win against David Brearley High School in the finals, the program's first sectional title win in eight years. The team won the 2023 North I Group I title with a 35-14 win against a Hawthorne High School team that had made it to the sectional title game for the first time in 35 years.

=== Lacrosse ===
The boys' lacrosse team has won the overall state championship in 1988 (defeating Westfield High School in the finals), 1989 (vs. Delbarton School), 1993 (vs. West Morris Mendham High School), 1995 (vs. Delbarton) and 1996 (vs. Hunterdon Central Regional High School). The team won the Group I state title in 2004 (vs. Summit High School), 2006 (vs. Summit), 2007 (vs. Madison High School), 2008 (vs. Chatham High School), 2013 (vs. Rumson-Fair Haven High School), 2014 (vs. Arthur L. Johnson High School), 2016 (vs. Madison), 2018 (vs. Manasquan High School), 2019 (vs. Manasquan), 2021 (vs. Manasquan) and 2022 (vs. Haddonfield Memorial High School); with 16 state championships, the program has won the most state titles of any public school and is tied with Delbarton School for the most overall. The team won the Tournament of Champions in 2007, 2008 and 2019 (defeating Delbarton all three seasons) and in 2022 (vs. Rumson-Fair Haven Regional High School); the four ToC titles are the second most in the state. The 2007 boys lacrosse team won the NJSIAA Group I state championship with an 8–6 win over Madison High School. The team moved on to win the Tournament of Champions, defeating Hunterdon Central Regional High School 9–5 in the semifinals, and took the state title with a 13–11 victory over Delbarton School, thereby, becoming state champions. The 2019 team won the Group I state title with an 8–7 win against previously undefeated Manasquan in a game that was suspended in the middle of the second quarter due to a lightning storm and was completed two days later, and went on to win the Tournament of Champions with a 7–6 victory in triple overtime against Summit in the semifinals and a 12–5 defeat of Delbarton in the finals at Kean University to finish the season with a 19–2 record.

On April 25, 2009, Tim Flynn became the first head coach in New Jersey, and only sixth coach in the nation, to reach 500 career wins. Flynn has been coaching Mountain Lakes High School for more than 39 years, with a record of 647–141, the most in the state, through the 2018 season.

The girls' lacrosse team won the Group I state championship in 2009 (defeating Shore Regional High School in the tournament final) and 2014 (vs. Oak Knoll School of the Holy Child). The 2007 girls lacrosse team won the North, Group I state sectional title, edging Chatham High School 14–13 in the tournament final.

=== Swimming ===
The boys' swimming team won the Division B state championship in 1962, 1964, 1965, 1967, 1969, and the Public B title in 1995, 1996, 2005–2009. The boys' 12 titles are the eighth-most of any school in the state. The girls' team won the Division B title in 1991 and the Public B title in 2008 and 2010.

The boys' swimming team won the 2007 North II – B state sectional championship with a 112–58 win over Chatham High School. The team moved on to win the 2007 Group B state championship, edging Haddonfield Memorial High School 86–84. The team won their fourth consecutive title in 2008, matching a feat that had not been accomplished by a public school since the 1970s. The boys swim team won the state championship every season since the 2004–05 season, until losing to Haddonfield in 2010.

The girls' swim team won the state title in the 2007–08 season over Chatham High School, making Mountain Lakes swimming to be the first high school to ever have both the boys and the girls win states.

=== Soccer ===
The girls' soccer won the Group I state championship in 2019, defeating Shore Regional High School by a score of 4–2 in the tournament final, to win the program's first state championship in its first finals appearance.

== Administration ==
The school's principal is Richard Mangili. His core administrative team includes the vice principal.

== Notable alumni ==
- Jo Becker (class of 1985), author, journalist and investigative reporter for The New York Times who is a three-time recipient of the Pulitzer Prize
- Liz Claiborne (1929–2007), fashion designer and businesswoman who was the first woman to become chair and CEO of a Fortune 500 company
- Laura Dreyfuss (born 1988), actress who appeared in the Broadway musical Dear Evan Hansen, in the role of Zoe Murphy, the love interest of the title character
- Richard M. Freeland (born 1941, class of 1959), education administrator who served as president of Northeastern University and as the commissioner of higher education for Massachusetts
- Peter Meinke (born 1932, class of 1950), poet and author
- Lindsey Munday (born 1984, class of 2002), former collegiate women's lacrosse player who is serving as the head coach of the USC Trojans women's lacrosse team
- Claire McCusker Murray (born 1982, class of 2000), principal deputy associate attorney general and acting associate attorney general in the Department of Justice
- Brian Platt, City manager of Kansas City, Missouri, since December 2020
- Bernard Shir-Cliff (1924–2017), editor for Ballantine Books, Contemporary Books, Warner Books and other publishers
- Tony Sorrentino (born 1983, class of 2001), football coach who is the wide receivers coach for the Arizona Cardinals of the National Football League
- Travis Tripucka (born 1989), football long snapper
- Brittany Underwood (born 1988), actress and singer best known for her role as teenager Langston Wilde on the daytime soap opera One Life to Live
- Adam Zucker (born 1976, class of 1994), sportscaster for CBS Sports and CBS Sports Network
