= Adam Zucker =

American sportscaster (born 1976)

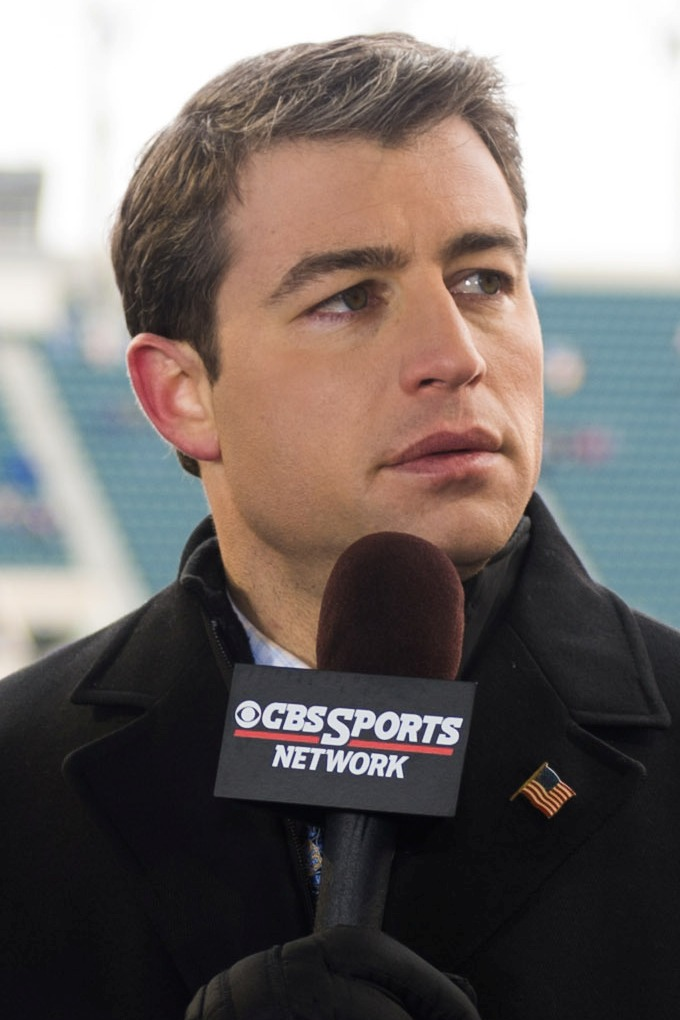
Adam Zucker in 2013

Adam M. Zucker (born October 27, 1976) is a sportscaster who works for CBS Sports and CBS Sports Network. He has been with CBS Sports Network since 2003 as lead anchor.

== Early life and education ==
Zucker is a native of Mountain Lakes, New Jersey, and a 1994 graduate of Mountain Lakes High School, which inducted him into its hall of fame in 2016. He graduated from Syracuse University's S. I. Newhouse School of Public Communications in 1998 with a degree in broadcast journalism.

== Career ==
Zucker began his career as a sideline reporter and as an on-site host for football games for the Syracuse Radio Network. He also worked as a sports reporter and sports anchor for local television stations: WBRE-TV and was a sports reporter at WTVH-TV.

=== CBS Sports ===
Zucker is a studio host for CBS Sports and CBS Sports Network, hosting College Football Today, Inside College Football, and Inside College Basketball. He has also called CBS Sports Spectacular's coverage of the College Home Run Derby. He also hosts Inside College Football and Inside College Basketball for the CBS Sports Network, in addition to hosting the College World Series, the NCAA Men's Basketball Championship, and the Men's and Women's lacrosse championship, along with narrating many of the network's other original programs and documents.

Beginning in 2011, he was named fill-in studio host of College Football on CBS when Tim Brando was on assignment before he was named permanent studio host in 2014 after Brando left for Fox Sports. Beginning in 2015, he was named fill-in studio host of College Basketball on CBS when fellow CBS colleague, Greg Gumbel, was on assignment, and following Gumbel’s family health issues and eventual death from cancer in 2024, he would permanently replace him as studio host, and he would also permanently replace him as studio host of the NCAA Men’s Basketball Championship Selection Show.

== Personal life ==
Zucker lives in the New York City area with his wife and their son, Max, and their daughter.
