= Brian Platt =

American public administrator

City Manager of Kansas City
- In office December 7, 2020 – March 27, 2025
- Preceded by: Earnest Rouse (acting)
- Succeeded by: Mario Vasquez

Administrator of Jersey City
- In office 2016–2020

Personal details
- Born: September 23, 1985 (age 41) Livingston, New Jersey, U.S.
- Education: Emory University (BA); Columbia University (MPA)

Brian Platt is a former American public administrator. He was the City Manager of Kansas City, Missouri, United States from December 2020 until the city terminated his contract in March 2025. He had previously worked as the City Administrator for Jersey City, New Jersey.

== Education and early career ==
Raised in Mountain Lakes, New Jersey, where graduated from Mountain Lakes High School. He earned his Bachelor of Arts Degree in philosophy at Emory University, where he competed in track and field. Platt earned his Master of Public Administration Degree at Columbia University.

His work experience includes management consulting with McKinsey & Company and as a kindergarten teacher with Teach For America.

== Administrator of Jersey City ==
A protege of Mayor Steve Fulop, Platt served as City Administrator for Jersey City, New Jersey from 2018-2020. He had served as city's first Chief Innovation Officer and established the city's Office of Innovation in 2015.

== City Manager of Kansas City ==
Platt began his role as City Manager of Kansas City in December 2020 during the COVID-19 pandemic while delivering basic services with a shrinking budget. As manager, Platt oversaw a staff of 4,500 employees providing services to Kansas City's 508,000 residents.

Platt developed a new street maintenance plan that doubled funding for street resurfacing, uses improved technology, and holds contractors accountable when they dig into streets. The city is now resurfacing more than 3.5 times the historic average and broke 500 lane miles of resurfacing in fiscal year 2024. He created a 24-hour snow removal strategy that added plows for residential streets and increased salting.

He launched the Vision Zero Campaign, with the goal of eliminating traffic fatalities and serious injuries by 2030 by improving high-risk intersections and adding 30 miles (48 km) of protected bike lanes in the first 18 months alone.

Platt created the Chief Equity Officer position, installing all-gender bathrooms, negotiating a new union contract with the Kansas City Fire Department that works to end past discriminatory practices, and investing in staff training, recruitment, and development.

Platt proposed building the country's largest city-owned solar farm at Kansas City International Airport. His other goals include developing new sustainability initiatives to reduce waste, energy usage, and dependence on fossil fuels, creating programs to produce more affordable housing and to address homelessness, and finding new ways to leverage technology to improve city services.

In 2024, Platt became a finalist for the position of City Manager of Austin, Texas, but withdrew from consideration, and the Kansas City Council subsequently extended his contract to August 1, 2027. On March 27, 2025, the Council voted to terminate his contract, after Mr. Platt ordered staff to lie to journalists and fired a whistleblower.

In November 2025, two financial agreements were reached between Platt and the city. Mr. Platt received at least $500,000 from the city Mario Vasquez replaced Platt in May 2025.
