= Frank Tripucka =

American football player (1927–2013)

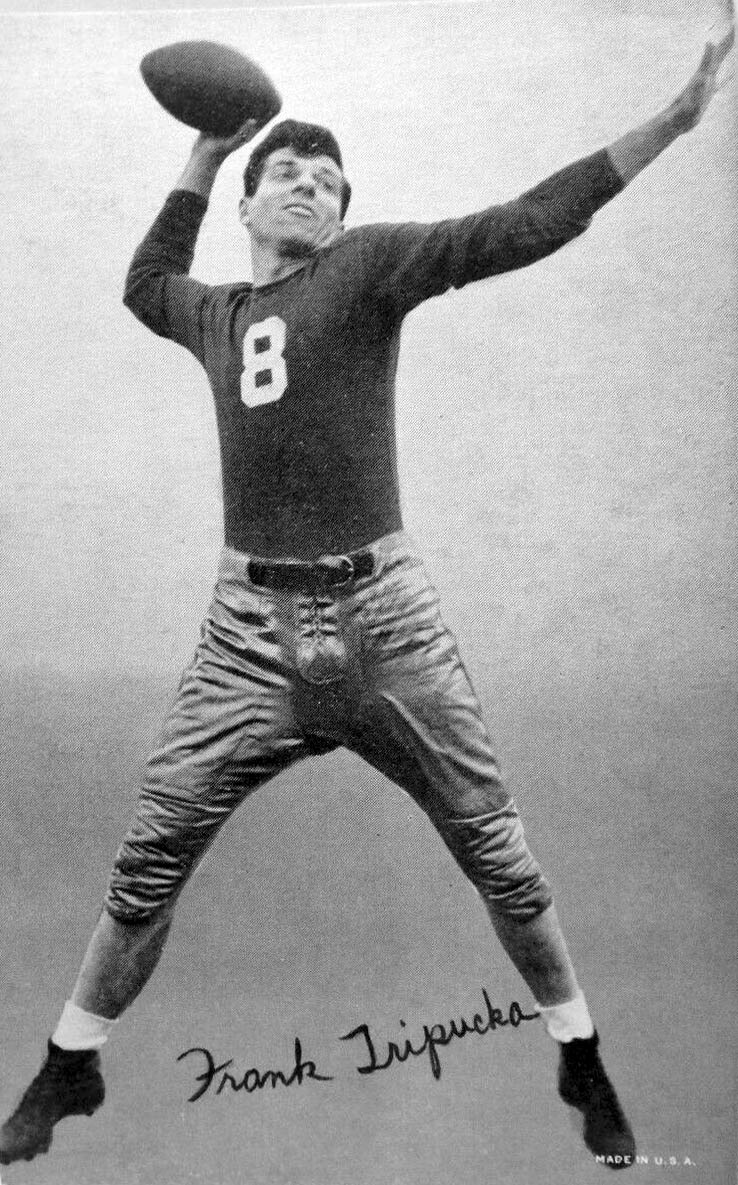
- Tripucka c. 1948–52

No. 28, 8, 11, 18, 91, 82, 83, 24
- Position: Quarterback

Personal information
- Born: December 8, 1927; Bloomfield, New Jersey, U.S.
- Died: September 12, 2013 (aged 85); Woodland Park, New Jersey, U.S.
- Listed height: 6 ft 2 in (1.88 m)
- Listed weight: 192 lb (87 kg)

Career information
- High school: Bloomfield
- College: Notre Dame (1945–1948)
- NFL draft: 1949: 1st round, 9th overall pick

Career history

Playing
- Philadelphia Eagles (1949); Detroit Lions (1949); Chicago Cardinals (1950–1952); Dallas Texans (1952); Saskatchewan Roughriders (1953–1958); Ottawa Rough Riders (1959); Saskatchewan Roughriders (1959); Denver Broncos (1960–1963); Saskatchewan Roughriders (1963)

Coaching
- Saskatchewan Roughriders (1959) Head coach

Awards and highlights
- AFL All-Star (1962); 2× AFL passing yards leader (1960, 1962); Denver Broncos Ring of Fame; Denver Broncos No. 18 retired (Note: Peyton Manning was permitted use of the number during his tenure with the Broncos by Tripucka.); 2× National champion (1946, 1947)

Career NFL/AFL statistics
- Passing attempts: 1,745
- Passing completions: 879
- Completion percentage: 50.4%
- TD–INT: 69–124
- Passing yards: 10,282
- Passer rating: 52.2
- Rushing yards: 101
- Rushing touchdowns: 6
- Stats at Pro Football Reference

Head coaching record
- Regular season: 1–6 (.143) (CFL)
- Postseason: 0–0 (–)
- Career: 1–6 (.143) (CFL)

Francis Joseph Tripucka (December 8, 1927 – September 12, 2013) was an American professional football player who was a quarterback for 15 seasons. He spent four seasons in the National Football League (NFL), eight in the Canadian Football League (CFL), and four in American Football League (AFL). (Note: Tripucka's final season in 1963 was split between the AFL and CFL.) He played college football for the Notre Dame Fighting Irish.

Tripucka achieved his greatest success as the inaugural quarterback of the AFL's Denver Broncos from 1960 to 1963. During Denver's inaugural year, Tripucka became the first NFL / AFL quarterback to throw for 3,000 yards in a season, and received All-Star honors in 1962 after again leading the league in passing. Tripucka was inducted to the Broncos Ring of Fame in 1986.

Tripucka has the lowest career passer rating in NFL history (Note: Minimum 1,500 passing attempts.) at 52.2.

== College career ==
The 6'2, 172-pound Tripucka was a three-time letter-winner at the University of Notre Dame. His first two seasons, he played backup quarterback to Heisman Trophy winner Johnny Lujack on unbeaten Notre Dame squads in 1946 and 1947. As a freshman backup in 1945, he completed his only pass for 19 yards, and carried twice for eight yards. In 1946, as a sophomore, he hit one of his five throws for 19 yards in relief on the national championship squad. He took approximately 1/4 of Frank Leahy's 1947 squad's pass attempts, connecting on 25 of 44 throws for 422 yards, three TDs, and one interception and a remarkable passer rating of 155.3, and helping the Irish to a second consecutive national championship. With Lujack's graduation, Tripucka became the undisputed starter his senior year. He completed 53 of 91 for 660 yards and a school-record 11 touchdowns, en route to a 9-0-1 record and the Irish's 3rd consecutive season without a loss. A tie against USC in the final game bumped them down to No. 2 behind undefeated Michigan. He played in the college All-Star Game that year.

== Professional career ==
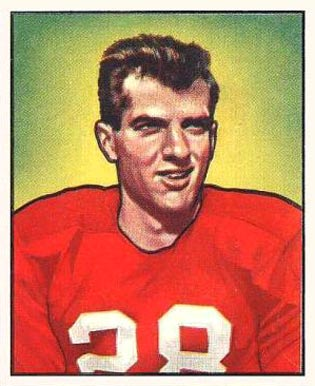
Tripucka on a 1950 Bowman football card

Tripucka went on to become a first-round selection (ninth overall pick) by the Philadelphia Eagles in the 1949 NFL draft, but was traded during the preseason to the Detroit Lions. He had four starts his rookie season, compiling a mediocre 9 touchdowns to 14 interceptions; he was also used as a punter 28 times. In 1950, he played for the Chicago Cardinals, where he had four passing touchdowns and a rushing touchdown in relief of Jim Hardy, including a 65 and an 81-yard touchdown pass in game 5 against Washington. In 1951, he had just 29 attempts in 1 start for the Cardinals, and only 12 attempts in six games in 1952 before being traded to the Dallas Texans mid-season. There, he started all six games, but had just 3 touchdowns to 17 interceptions, and a 1–5 record. The Dallas Texans folded after one season, so Tripucka accepted a large contract for the time with the Saskatchewan Roughriders of the Canadian Football League (CFL).

Tripucka then took a seven-year run in the CFL. He joined the Saskatchewan Roughriders and their new coach Frank Filchock as the starting quarterback in 1953. He played there through 1958, when he was traded to the Ottawa Rough Riders but struggled and was released. He was back in Saskatchewan before the end of the 1959 season as a coach. Non-Canadians playing Canadian professional football were known as imports, and each team was limited to 12. These spots were filled, so Coach Tripucka was ineligible to play. However, in the fourteenth game of the season, all three Roughrider quarterbacks were sidelined by injuries. For the last two games, management decided to play Tripucka anyway, and forfeit in advance. The Roughriders lost the first of them on the scoreboard as well, 20-19 versus the Edmonton Eskimos. But in the last game of the season against Bud Grant's Winnipeg Blue Bombers, Tripucka had 17 completions in 29 passes and Ferdy Burket ran for five touchdowns. Officially, the final score was Saskatchewan 37, Winnipeg 30 for a Winnipeg "victory".

After getting fired by Saskatchewan, Tripucka came out of retirement with the American Football League (AFL) as the starting quarterback for the new Denver Broncos franchise. The Broncos had hired Filchock as their coach, and he initially brought Tripucka along as an assistant. He started all 14 games in Denver's inaugural 1960 season, and though he led the league in interceptions in 1960 with 34 (still a Broncos franchise record), he also led the league with 248 of 478 passes for 3,038 yards (the first 3000+ yard season by either an NFL or AFL quarterback), to go with 24 touchdowns, including the first TD pass in AFL history. He started 11 games in 1961, throwing for 1,690 yards, 10 touchdowns, and 21 interceptions. In 1962, he again led the league with 240 completions, 440 attempts, and 2,917 yards. This included a week 2 victory over Buffalo, in which Tripucka threw for a remarkable 447 yards, a franchise record that stood for 38 years. On the season, he totaled 17 touchdowns and 25 interceptions, and was selected for the AFL's All Star game for the only time in his career. In his last season, Tripucka had just 7 completions for 31 yards in two games. He returned to Saskatchewan in his final season to be the back up to Ron Lancaster and finished the season with 38 completions for 435 yards.

Tripucka retired in 1963 after 15 professional seasons. The Broncos subsequently retired his #18 jersey. In 1986, Tripucka was one of three players to be inducted into the Denver Broncos Ring of Fame. On March 9, 2012, Tripucka stated that he would allow #18 to be worn again by Peyton Manning if the Broncos were to sign him. On March 20, 2012, at a Broncos press conference announcing the signing of Manning, John Elway thanked Tripucka "for allowing the franchise to ‘borrow’ the number for Manning." On March 7, 2016, the #18 jersey returned to retirement when Manning announced that he was retiring after 18 professional seasons (4 seasons with the Broncos).

== Football career statistics ==
Legend
| **Bold** | Career high |
| Underline | Incomplete data |

=== NFL/AFL ===
| Year | Team | Games | | | Passing | | | | | | | Rushing | | | | | Punting | | | |
| Year | Team | GP | GS | Record | Cmp | Att | Pct | Yds | Avg | TD | Int | Att | Yds | Avg | Lng | TD | Pnt | Yds | Avg | Lng |
|---|---|---|---|---|---|---|---|---|---|---|---|---|---|---|---|---|---|---|---|---|
| 1949 | DET | 6 | 4 | — | 62 | 145 | 42.8 | 833 | 5.7 | 9 | 14 | **12** | **36** | 3.0 | 18 | 1 | 28 | 1,074 | 38.4 | 50 |
| 1950 | CC | 10 | 4 | 2–2–0 | 47 | 108 | 43.5 | 720 | 6.7 | 4 | 7 | 4 | 35 | 8.8 | **21** | 1 | — | — | — | — |
| 1951 | CC | 3 | 1 | 1–0–0 | 17 | 29 | 58.6 | 244 | **8.4** | 2 | 1 | 1 | 14 | **14.0** | 14 | 0 | 11 | 429 | 39.0 | 56 |
| 1952 | CC | 6 | 1 | 0–1–0 | 5 | 12 | 41.7 | 40 | 3.3 | 0 | 0 | 1 | -3 | -3.0 | -3 | 0 | 31 | **1,155** | 37.3 | **65** |
| 1952 | DT | 6 | 6 | 1–5–0 | 86 | 174 | 49.4 | 769 | 4.4 | 3 | 17 | 9 | 28 | 3.1 | 15 | 3 | 4 | 167 | **41.8** | **65** |
| 1960 | DEN | **14** | **14** | 4–9–1 | **248** | **478** | 51.9 | **3,038** | 6.4 | **24** | **34** | 10 | 0 | 0.0 | 0 | 0 | — | — | — | — |
| 1961 | DEN | **14** | 11 | 3–8–0 | 167 | 344 | 48.5 | 1,690 | 4.9 | 10 | 21 | 4 | -8 | -2.0 | — | 0 | — | — | — | — |
| 1962 | DEN | **14** | 13 | **6–7–0** | 240 | 440 | **54.5** | 2,917 | 6.6 | 17 | 25 | 2 | -1 | -0.5 | 1 | 1 | — | — | — | — |
| 1963 | DEN | 2 | 2 | 0–2–0 | 7 | 15 | 46.7 | 31 | 2.1 | 0 | 5 | — | — | — | — | — | — | — | — | — |
| Career | | 75 | 56 | 17–34–1 | 879 | 1,745 | 50.4 | 10,282 | 5.9 | 69 | 124 | 43 | 101 | 2.3 | 21 | 6 | 74 | 2,825 | 38.2 | 65 |

=== CFL ===
| Year | Team | Games | | | Passing | | | | | | | Rushing | | | | | Punting | | | |
| Year | Team | GP | GS | Record | Cmp | Att | Pct | Yds | Avg | TD | Int | Att | Yds | Avg | Lng | TD | Pnt | Yds | Avg | Lng |
|---|---|---|---|---|---|---|---|---|---|---|---|---|---|---|---|---|---|---|---|---|
| 1953 | SASK | 4 | 4 | — | 59 | 94 | 62.8 | 703 | 7.5 | 4 | 5 | 5 | -77 | -15.4 | 0 | 0 | 31 | 1,463 | 47.2 | 76 |
| 1954 | SASK | 14 | — | — | 152 | 259 | 58.7 | 2,003 | 7.7 | 14 | 14 | 25 | -125 | -5.0 | 3 | 1 | 16 | 686 | 42.9 | 55 |
| 1955 | SASK | 16 | 16 | 10–6–0 | 158 | 257 | 61.5 | 2,306 | 9.0 | 11 | 17 | 36 | -155 | -4.3 | 8 | 0 | 7 | 242 | 34.6 | 58 |
| 1956 | SASK | 16 | 16 | 10–6–0 | 216 | 383 | 56.4 | 3,274 | 8.5 | 18 | 22 | 31 | -138 | -4.5 | 9 | 1 | — | — | — | — |
| 1957 | SASK | 16 | 16 | 3–12–1 | 172 | 343 | 50.1 | 2,589 | 7.5 | 12 | 29 | 29 | -95 | -3.3 | 9 | 3 | — | — | — | — |
| 1958 | SASK | 13 | — | — | 189 | 338 | 55.9 | 2,766 | 8.2 | 20 | 27 | 26 | -58 | -2.2 | 9 | 0 | 19 | 936 | 49.3 | **80** |
| 1959 | OTT | 8 | 3 | — | 79 | 145 | 54.5 | 1,119 | 7.7 | 4 | 14 | 3 | -3 | -1.0 | 0 | 0 | 52 | 2,057 | 39.6 | 58 |
| 1959 | SASK | 2 | 0 | — | 27 | 45 | 60.0 | 311 | 6.9 | 1 | 3 | 3 | 3 | 1.0 | 3 | 0 | — | — | — | — |
| 1963 | SASK | 7 | 0 | — | 38 | 66 | 57.6 | 435 | 6.6 | 3 | 5 | 4 | -8 | -2.0 | 2 | 0 | 4 | 185 | 46.2 | 651 |
| Career | | 89 | 55 | 23–24–1 | 1,090 | 1,930 | 56.5 | 15,506 | 8.0 | 87 | 136 | 162 | -656 | -4.0 | 9 | 5 | 129 | 5,569 | 43.2 | 80 |

== Personal life ==
Tripucka is the father of former Notre Dame and Detroit Pistons basketball star Kelly Tripucka, who also played for the Utah Jazz and the Charlotte Hornets. All six sons played Division I sports. Even his daughter was a good athlete. The oldest boy, Tracy, played basketball at Lafayette College and then professionally in Switzerland. Mark was a quarterback at the University of Massachusetts. Todd also played basketball at Lafayette College and broke many of his older brother Tracy's records. T.K., the tallest of the Tripucka boys at 6'9", played basketball at Fordham University. He also played one season under his brother Tracy, who took over as the Fordham head coach. On one unique night, Fordham played Notre Dame at Madison Square Garden, so T.K. played against his Notre Dame freshman brother Kelly, with oldest brother Tracy coaching Fordham. Kelly was an All-American at Notre Dame and then had an excellent 10-year career in the NBA with the Detroit Pistons, Utah Jazz, and Charlotte Hornets. Kelly was a two-time NBA All-Star. Chris, the youngest of the family, played quarterback, wide receiver, and kicker at Boston College, all with Heisman Trophy winner Doug Flutie.

Tripucka is also the grandfather of punter Shane Tripucka (Chris' son) and former NFL long snapper Travis Tripucka, and former professional lacrosse player Jake Tripucka (both Kelly's sons). Shane played for the Los Angeles Chargers in the 2018 NFL preseason, averaging 45.5 yards per punt. He played for the XFL LA Wildcats in 2020. Shane was also a First-team All-American and All-SEC punter at Texas A&M where he set several punting records.

Tripucka died of congestive heart failure on September 12, 2013, at his home in Woodland Park, New Jersey, aged 85.

== Legacy ==
In 1997, Tripucka was inducted into the National Polish-American Sports Hall of Fame.

== See also ==
- List of American Football League players
