= Kelly Tripucka =

American basketball player (born 1959)

Personal information
- Born: February 16, 1959 (age 67) Glen Ridge, New Jersey, U.S.
- Listed height: 6 ft 6 in (1.98 m)
- Listed weight: 220 lb (100 kg)

Career information
- High school: Bloomfield (Bloomfield, New Jersey)
- College: Notre Dame (1977–1981)
- NBA draft: 1981: 1st round, 12th overall pick
- Drafted by: Detroit Pistons
- Playing career: 1981–1992
- Position: Small forward
- Number: 7, 4

Career history
- 1981–1986: Detroit Pistons
- 1986–1988: Utah Jazz
- 1988–1991: Charlotte Hornets
- 1991–1992: CSP Limoges

Career highlights
- 2× NBA All-Star (1982, 1984); NBA All-Rookie First Team (1982); 2× Consensus second-team All-American (1979, 1981); Third-team All-American – UPI (1980)

Career NBA statistics
- Points: 12,142 (17.2 ppg)
- Rebounds: 2,703 (3.8 rpg)
- Assists: 2,090 (3.0 apg)
- Stats at NBA.com
- Stats at Basketball Reference

Peter Kelly Tripucka (born February 16, 1959) is an American former professional basketball player who played in the National Basketball Association (NBA) from 1981 to 1991. He was a two-time NBA All Star and averaged over twenty points a game in five of the ten seasons that he played in. Tripucka played for the Detroit Pistons, Utah Jazz and was a member of the Charlotte Hornets during their inaugural season in the NBA. The son of NFL Pro-Bowl (and CFL) quarterback Frank Tripucka, Kelly was a color analyst for the New York Knicks for four years, ending with the 2011–12 season.

== High school and college ==
Tripucka grew up in Bloomfield, New Jersey, and was a three-year starter from 1974 to 1977 for the Bloomfield High School boys' basketball team. In three varsity seasons he scored 2,278 points, including 1,045 during his senior campaign, and his jersey (#42) was retired by Bloomfield High School. Tripucka also was a four-year starter at Notre Dame, and led the Irish in scoring each year. His senior year, he averaged 18.2 points per game on 55.1% shooting, with 5.8 rebounds per game. He also helped lead Notre Dame to the NCAA Tournament in each of his four years, with the Irish earning their first, and to this point, their only Final Four appearance in 1978.

== Professional career ==
=== Detroit Pistons ===
Tripucka was selected 12th overall by the Detroit Pistons in the 1981 NBA draft. He proved to be a prolific scorer, averaging 21.6 points per game, and he made the All-Star team in his rookie year. The following season Tripucka had his best season as a professional, averaging a career-best 26.5 points and 4.1 assists per game. He played in only 58 games, however. In his third season with the Pistons, Tripucka continued to play well, averaging 21.3 points per game, and qualified for the All-Star team a second time in three seasons. He helped lead the Pistons to their first playoff appearance since the 1976–77 season, but they were eliminated in five games in the first round. The following season, Tripucka played in only 55 games and averaged 19.1 points per game. He did start all nine playoff games, however, and helped the Pistons advance to the second round. The 1985–86 season, Tripucka's fifth, was another successful one. He missed only one game during the regular season, averaged 20 points per game, and helped lead the Pistons to a third straight post-season appearance. In the playoffs, however, the Pistons were eliminated in the first round.

=== Utah Jazz ===
After five successful seasons in Detroit, the Pistons traded Tripucka and teammate Kent Benson to the Utah Jazz for Adrian Dantley and future draft picks. Tripucka and Jazz coach Frank Layden did not get along with each other; at the time, Layden was beginning to build the team around the talents of John Stockton and Karl Malone, and Tripucka was upset at his lack of involvement in the offense. He had two lackluster seasons with the franchise, averaging only 9.1 points per game during his two seasons with the team. The Jazz qualified for the playoffs during both of those seasons, but Tripucka made little impression. During the 1988 NBA playoffs, he would only appear in two games.

=== Charlotte Hornets ===
After two frustrating seasons with the Jazz, Tripucka was traded to the Charlotte Hornets (a new expansion team at the time) for Mike Brown. In his first season with the Hornets, he returned to his All-Star form, leading the Hornets with 22.6 points per game. In a game between the Hornets and the Jazz in 1989, shortly after Layden resigned as the Jazz's coach, Karl Malone expressed his devotion to Layden by writing "FRANK" on the heels of his sneakers. In a mock gesture, Tripucka responded by writing "DICK" on the back of his shoes (for then-Hornets coach Dick Harter). The move was seen as a jab at Layden and Malone, whom Tripucka felt ran him out of Utah. In Tripucka's second season with the Hornets, he averaged 15.6 points per game, but the team struggled, finishing one game behind their inaugural season's record. The 1990–91 season, Tripucka's third with the Hornets and tenth overall, saw him average career lows with only 7 points, 2.3 rebounds and 2.1 assists per game, as he came off the bench.

=== CSP Limoges ===
After failing to find suitors in the NBA, Tripucka signed with French Nationale 1A club CSP Limoges for the 1991–1992 season. In February 1992, he was replaced with Tim Legler. In 7 league games, he averaged 17.6 points per game.

== Later life ==
Tripucka was a color commentator for Detroit Pistons television for eight seasons, from 1993 to 2001. After 2001 he left FSN Detroit and WKBD before leaving to take a full-time radio job with the New Jersey Nets following the 2000–01 season. From 2003 to 2005, he served as the color commentator for New Jersey Nets telecasts on the YES Network. Tripucka joined the New York Knicks MSG broadcast team on November 7, 2008, placing him alongside Walt "Clyde" Frazier, Gus Johnson and Mike Breen. He remained with the broadcast team until 2012. Tripucka has also called college basketball for Westwood One radio.

== Personal life ==
Tripucka resided in 2013 in Boonton Township, New Jersey with his family. He is the son of former football quarterback Frank Tripucka, and father of professional football player Travis Tripucka.

== Honors ==
In 2000, Tripucka was named to the National Polish-American Hall of Fame, and the Star-Ledger named Tripucka the "New Jersey Boys' Basketball Player of the Century". In 2008, he was named to the "50 Greatest Pistons" team. Tripucka shares the record for most points scored in his first road playoff game, with 40. He is one of six Pistons to have scored 40 or more in a playoff game, along with Dave Bing, Isiah Thomas, Jerry Stackhouse, Chauncey Billups and Richard (Rip) Hamilton.

== NBA career statistics ==
Legend
GP	Games played	GS	Games started	MPG	Minutes per game
FG%	Field goal percentage	3P%	3-point field goal percentage	FT%	Free throw percentage
RPG	Rebounds per game	APG	Assists per game	SPG	Steals per game
BPG	Blocks per game	PPG	Points per game	**Bold**	Career high

*	Led the league

=== Regular season ===
Year	Team	GP	GS	MPG	FG%	3P%	FT%	RPG	APG	SPG	BPG	PPG
1981–82	Detroit	**82**	**82**	37.5	.496	.227	.797	**5.4**	3.3	1.1	0.2	21.6
1982–83	Detroit	58	58	**38.8***	.489	.378	.845	4.6	**4.1**	**1.2**	**0.3**	**26.5**
1983–84	Detroit	76	75	32.8	.459	.118	.815	4.0	3.0	0.9	0.2	21.3
1984–85	Detroit	55	43	30.5	.477	.400	.885	4.0	2.5	0.9	**0.3**	19.1
1985–86	Detroit	81	81	32.4	**.498**	**.480**	.856	4.3	3.3	1.1	0.1	20.0
1986–87	Utah	79	76	23.6	.469	.365	.872	3.1	3.1	1.1	0.1	10.1
1987–88	Utah	49	21	19.9	.459	.419	.868	2.4	2.1	0.7	0.1	7.5
1988–89	Charlotte	71	65	32.4	.467	.357	.866	3.8	3.2	**1.2**	0.2	22.6
1989–90	Charlotte	79	73	30.4	.430	.365	.883	4.1	2.8	0.9	0.2	15.6
1990–91	Charlotte	71	1	16.7	.454	.333	**.910**	2.3	2.1	0.4	0.2	7.0
Career		707	575	29.6	.473	.361	.849	3.8	3.0	1.0	0.2	17.2
All-Star		2	0	10.5	.429	–	.500	0.5	2.0	0.5	0.0	3.5

=== Playoffs ===
Year	Team	GP	GS	MPG	FG%	3P%	FT%	RPG	APG	SPG	BPG	PPG
1984	Detroit	5	–	41.6	.471	.000	.804	4.6	3.0	**2.2**	0.0	**27.4**
1985	Detroit	**9**	**9**	32.0	.415	.000	.875	4.3	**3.2**	0.4	0.3	14.8
1986	Detroit	4	4	**43.8**	.465	–	.913	**5.8**	2.3	0.8	**0.5**	21.8
1987	Utah	5	5	14.0	**.700**	.000	**1.000**	1.4	0.6	0.8	0.0	6.4
1988	Utah	2	0	4.5	.333	–	–	0.5	0.5	0.0	0.0	0.5
Career		25	18	30.0	.462	.000	.856	3.7	2.3	0.9	0.2	15.6

== Personal life ==
He is the son of former Notre Dame Quarterback and Denver Broncos Hall of Fame QB Frank Tripucka. He is also the uncle of football players Shane Tripucka and father of Travis Tripucka and professional lacrosse player Jake Tripucka.

== See also ==
- List of National Basketball Association annual minutes leaders
