= Mike Michalowicz =

Entrepreneur, TV host, columnist

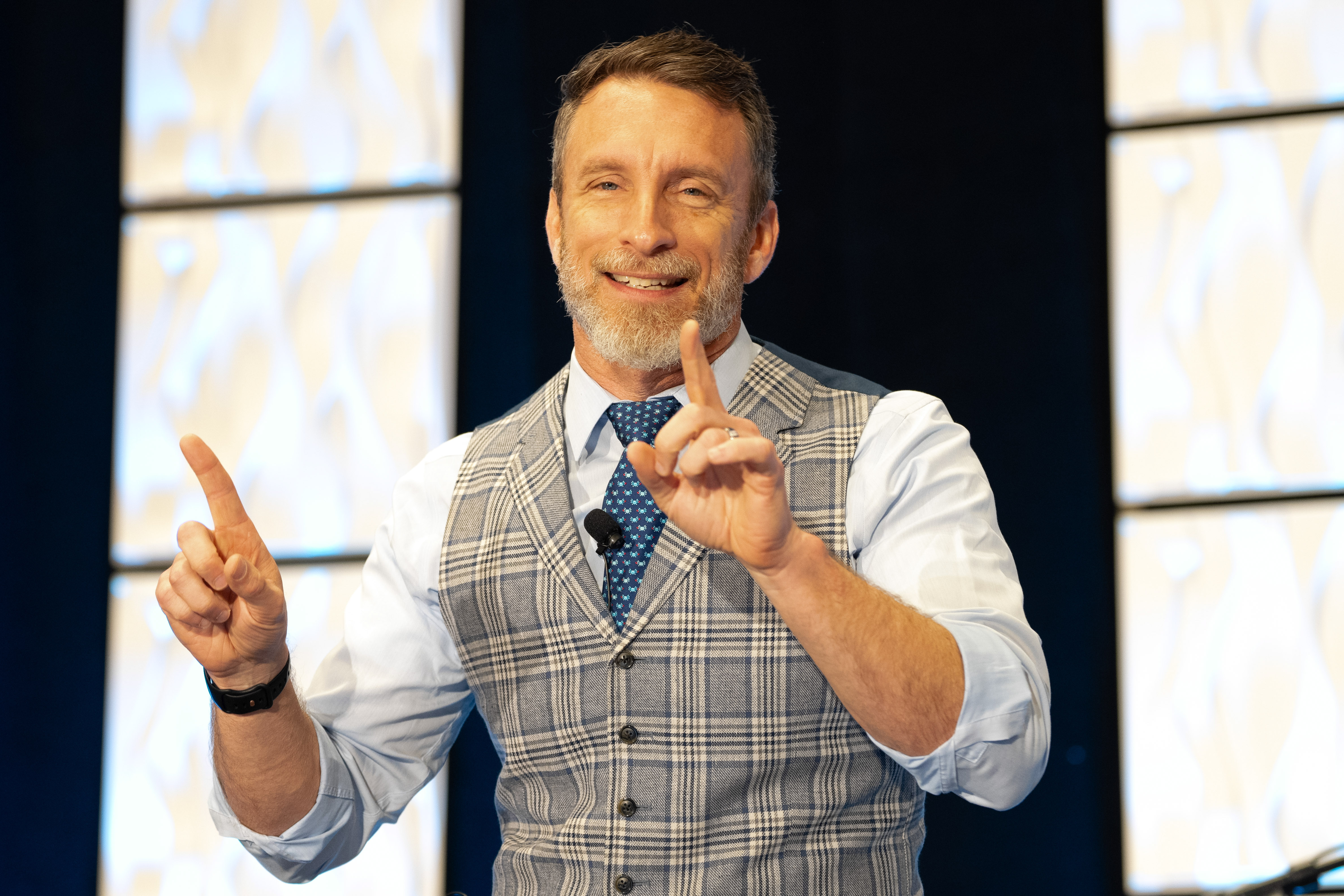
- Michalowicz in 2024
- Born: Michael Michalowicz; September 19, 1970 (age 55); Boonton Township, New Jersey, US
- Education: Virginia Tech
- Occupation: Author
- Spouse: Kristen Michalowicz
- Website: www.mikemichalowicz.com

Michael Michalowicz (/mɪˈkæləwɪts/ mick-AL-ə-wits; born September 19, 1970) is an American business author and entrepreneur. He is the author of nine business books published by Penguin Random House, including All In (2023), Get Different (2021), Profit First (2017), The Pumpkin Plan (2012) and Clockwork Revised & Expanded (2022).

Previously, he hosted the “Business Rescue” segment for MSNBC’s Your Business, was a small business columnist for The Wall Street Journal, and starred in the reality television program Bailout!.

== Early life ==
Born and raised in Boonton Township, New Jersey, Michalowicz attended Boonton High School, graduated from Virginia Tech in 1993, where he was captain of the Virginia Tech men’s lacrosse team. He graduated with two degrees, one in finance and the other in management science.

== Career ==
Michalowicz founded Olmec Systems in 1996 and sold the business in a private equity transaction in 2003. In 2003 he co-founded a computer forensic firm, which was acquired by Robert Half International in 2006. Terms were not disclosed. Michalowicz owns seven companies. He is a co-founder of six additional organizations with exclusive licensing rights to his work.

== Books ==
- Michalowicz, Mike (2023). All In: How Great Leaders Build Unstoppable Teams. New York: Portfolio/Penguin. ISBN 978-0593544501.
- Michalowicz, Mike (2021). My Money Bunnies: Fun Money Management For Kids. New York: Obsidian Launch. ISBN 978-0578929989.
- Michalowicz, Mike (2021). Get Different: Marketing That Can't Be Ignored. New York: Portfolio/Penguin. ISBN 978-0593330630.
- Michalowicz, Mike (2020). Fix This Next: Make The Vital Change That Will Level Up Your Business. New York: Portfolio/Penguin. ISBN 978-0593084410.
- Michalowicz, Mike (2018). Clockwork (Revised & Expanded): Design Your Business To Run Itself. New York: Portfolio/Penguin. ISBN 978-0593538173.
- Michalowicz, Mike (2017). Profit First (Revised & Expanded): Transform Your Business From A Cash Eating Monster To A Money Making Machine. New York: Portfolio/Penguin. ISBN 978-0735214149.
- Michalowicz, Mike (2016). Surge: Time the Marketplace, Ride the Wave of Consumer Demand, and Become Your Industry's Big Kahuna. New York: Obsidian Press. ISBN 978-0981808246.
- Michalowicz, Mike (2012). The Pumpkin Plan: A Simple Strategy To Grow A Remarkable Business In Any Field. New York: Portfolio/Penguin. ISBN 978-1591844884.
- Michalowicz, Mike (2008). The Toilet Paper Entrepreneur: The tell-it-like-it-is guide to cleaning up in business, even if you are at the end of your roll. New York: Obsidian Press. ISBN 978-0981808208.
