= Boonton Township, New Jersey =

Township in Morris County, New Jersey, US

- Township
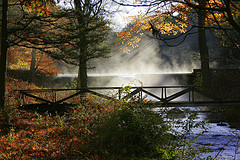
- Dolan's Falls early morning

- Location of Boonton Township in Morris County highlighted in red (right). Inset map: Location of Morris County in New Jersey highlighted in orange (left).

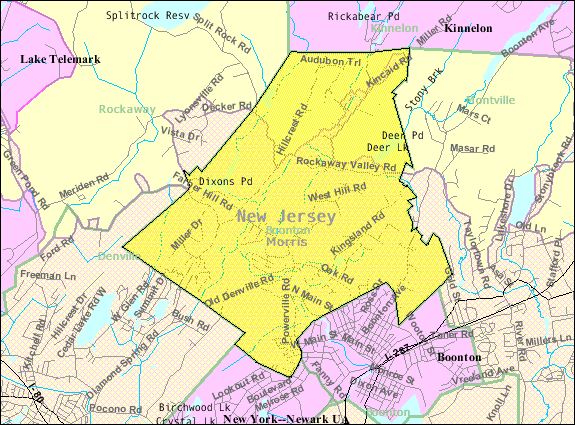
- Census Bureau map of Boonton Township, New Jersey

- Location in Morris County Location in New Jersey Location in the United States
- Coordinates: 40.931264°N 74.424928°W
- Country: United States
- State: New Jersey
- County: Morris
- Incorporated: April 11, 1867
- Named after: Thomas Boone

Government
  - Type: Township
  - Body: Township Committee
  - Mayor: William Klingener (R, term ends December 31, 2028)
  - Administrator: Douglas Cabana
  - Municipal clerk: Douglas Cabana

Area
  - Total: 8.50 sq mi (22.01 km^{2})
  - Land: 8.12 sq mi (21.04 km^{2})
  - Water: 0.37 sq mi (0.97 km^{2}) 4.41%
  - Rank: 227th of 565 in state 18th of 39 in county
- Elevation: 518 ft (158 m)

Population (2020)
  - Total: 4,380
  - Estimate (2023): 4,412
  - Rank: 402nd of 565 in state 33rd of 39 in county
  - Density: 538.7/sq mi (208.0/km^{2})
  - Rank: 439th of 565 in state 34th of 39 in county
- Time zone: UTC−05:00 (Eastern (EST))
  - Summer (DST): UTC−04:00 (Eastern (EDT))
- ZIP Code: 07005
- Area code: 973
- FIPS code: 3402706640
- GNIS feature ID: 0882205
- Website: www.boontontownship.com

Boonton Township (/ˈbutən/) is a township in Morris County, in the U.S. state of New Jersey. As of the 2020 United States census, the township's population was 4,380, an increase of 117 (2.7%) from the 2010 census count of 4,263, which in turn reflected a decline of 24 (−0.6%) from 4,287 in the 2000 census.

Boonton Township was incorporated by an act of the New Jersey Legislature on April 11, 1867, from portions of Pequannock Township. The borough of Mountain Lakes was formed from portions of the township on March 3, 1924. The settlement was originally called "Boone-Towne" in 1761 in honor of the Colonial Governor Thomas Boone.

New Jersey Monthly magazine ranked Boonton Township as the 4th best place to live in the state in its rankings of the "New Jersey's Top Towns 2011–2012.

== History ==
Boonton Township's recorded history began about 1710 when William Penn, the Quaker land speculator, located in the northern valley his Lot No. 48, which contained 1,430 acres (580 ha) of fields and woodlands. James Bollen, whose bordering "plantation" stretching south toward the Tourne was described as "situate on the fork of Rockaway with an Indian plantation in it," mapped his 1,507 acres (6 km^{2}) in 1715. In 1765 David Ogden purchased from Burnet and Skinner the Great Boonton Tract. When the Township of Boonton was created as of April 11, 1867 by "An Act to Divide the Township of Pequannoc in the County of Morris" most of Penn's Lot No. 48 and parts of the Bollen and Great Boonton Tracts fell within Boonton's boundary.

The first settler of proper record was Frederick DeMouth of French Huguenot extraction. By 1758, his Rockaway Valley plantation within the Penn Lot covered 672 acres (2.72 km^{2}), and it was on this land that the large Stickle, Bott and Kincaid farms were to prosper in the far distant future. Frederick Miller of German Palatine birth bought extensive land (later day Dixon acres) within the Bollen piece at 13 shillings per acre. These founding families were closely followed by the Hoplers, Van Winkles, Cooks, Scotts, Peers, Stickles and Kanouses.

McCaffrey Lane, the oldest recorded thoroughfare in the area, was built in 1767 by Samuel Ogden of the Great Boonton Tract. In 1822, North Main Street was "cut" along the proposed Morris Canal route. In 1824, the Morris Canal and Banking Company was chartered with John Scott of Powerville, an important commissioner. Locks number 9, 10 and 11 were constructed in newly named Powerville.

The Powerville Hotel, still standing, was built near Lock Number 11 to accommodate both canal and transient trade. The hotel, owned by Nathan Hopkins, gained fame as a station on the pre-American Civil War Underground Railroad.

== Geography ==
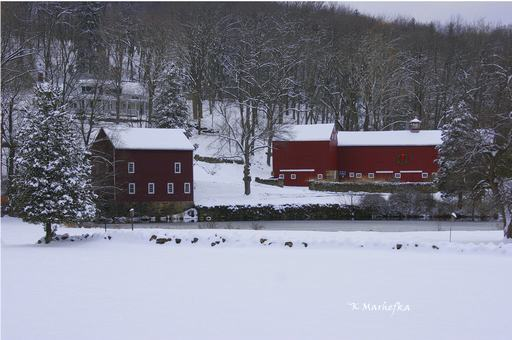
Dixon Homestead in Winter

According to the United States Census Bureau, the township had a total area of 8.50 square miles (22.01 km^{2}), including 8.12 square miles (21.04 km^{2}) of land and 0.38 square miles (0.97 km^{2}) of water (4.41%).

Unincorporated communities, localities and place names located partially or completely within the township include Deer Pond, Dixons Pond, Powerville, Rockaway Valley and Sheep Hill.

The township borders the Morris County municipalities of Boonton, Denville Township, Kinnelon, Montville, Mountain Lakes and Rockaway Township.

== Demographics ==
Historical population
Census	Pop.	Note	%±
1880	405		—
1890	326		−19.5%
1900	809		148.2%
1910	428		−47.1%
1920	684		59.8%
1930	623	*	−8.9%
1940	817		31.1%
1950	1,155		41.4%
1960	1,998		73.0%
1970	3,070		53.7%
1980	3,273		6.6%
1990	3,566		9.0%
2000	4,287		20.2%
2010	4,263		−0.6%
2020	4,380		2.7%
2023 (est.)	4,412		0.7%
Population sources: 1880–1920 1880–1890; 1890–1910 1910–1930; 1940–2000 2000; 2010 2020 * = Lost territory in previous decade.

=== Census 2010 ===
The 2010 United States census counted 4,263 people, 1,575 households, and 1,150 families in the township. The population density was 517.2 per square mile (199.7/km^{2}). There were 1,647 housing units at an average density of 199.8 per square mile (77.1/km^{2}). The racial makeup was 92.35% (3,937) White, 1.55% (66) Black or African American, 0.12% (5) Native American, 3.99% (170) Asian, 0.05% (2) Pacific Islander, 0.54% (23) from other races, and 1.41% (60) from two or more races. Hispanic or Latino of any race were 4.18% (178) of the population.

Of the 1,575 households, 33.8% had children under the age of 18; 63.1% were married couples living together; 7.2% had a female householder with no husband present and 27.0% were non-families. Of all households, 23.9% were made up of individuals and 12.2% had someone living alone who was 65 years of age or older. The average household size was 2.65 and the average family size was 3.17.

24.7% of the population were under the age of 18, 5.6% from 18 to 24, 16.2% from 25 to 44, 35.4% from 45 to 64, and 18.1% who were 65 years of age or older. The median age was 46.5 years. For every 100 females, the population had 97.1 males. For every 100 females ages 18 and older there were 92.4 males.

The Census Bureau's 2006–2010 American Community Survey showed that (in 2010 inflation-adjusted dollars) median household income was $117,333 (with a margin of error of ± $21,364) and the median family income was $135,781 (± $33,990). Males had a median income of $102,250 (± $17,348) versus $62,452 (± $17,486) for females. The per capita income for the township was $61,267 (± $12,232). About 3.8% of families and 3.4% of the population were below the poverty line, including 1.6% of those under age 18 and none of those age 65 or over.

Based on data from the 2006–2010 American Community Survey, Boonton Township had a per capita income of $61,267 (ranked 50th in the state), compared to per capita income in Morris County of $47,342 and statewide of $34,858.

=== Census 2000 ===
As of the 2000 United States census there were 4,287 people, 1,476 households, and 1,157 families residing in the township. The population density was 508.9 inhabitants per square mile (196.5/km^{2}). There were 1,510 housing units at an average density of 179.2 per square mile (69.2/km^{2}). The racial makeup of the township was 93.00% White, 1.19% African American, 0.05% Native American, 4.08% Asian, 0.63% from other races, and 1.05% from two or more races. Hispanic or Latino of any race were 2.15% of the population.

There were 1,476 households, out of which 36.7% had children under the age of 18 living with them, 70.1% were married couples living together, 5.2% had a female householder with no husband present, and 21.6% were non-families. 17.5% of all households were made up of individuals, and 7.6% had someone living alone who was 65 years of age or older. The average household size was 2.78 and the average family size was 3.18.

In the township the population was spread out, with 24.9% under the age of 18, 4.9% from 18 to 24, 27.0% from 25 to 44, 28.4% from 45 to 64, and 14.9% who were 65 years of age or older. The median age was 42 years. For every 100 females, there were 98.6 males. For every 100 females age 18 and over, there were 93.3 males.

The median income for a household in the township was $91,753, and the median income for a family was $102,944. Males had a median income of $77,133 versus $46,302 for females. The per capita income for the township was $45,014. About 0.9% of families and 1.3% of the population were below the poverty line, including 0.5% of those under age 18 and 2.2% of those age 65 or over.

== Government ==
=== Local government ===
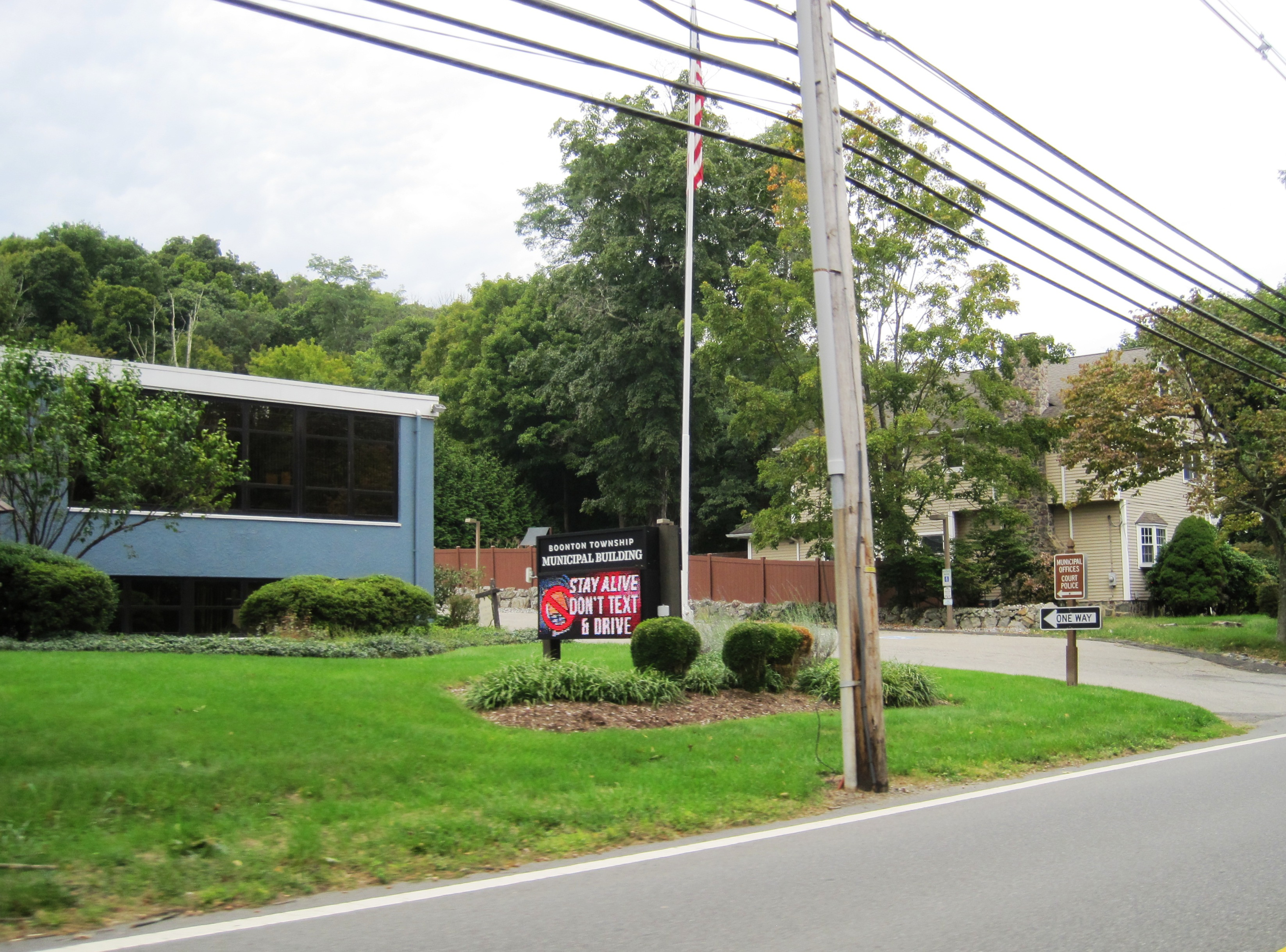
Boonton Township Municipal Building

Boonton Township is governed under the Township form of New Jersey municipal government, one of 141 municipalities (of the 564) statewide that use this form, the second-most commonly used form of government in the state. The Township Committee is comprised of five members, who are elected directly by the voters at-large in partisan elections to serve three-year terms of office on a staggered basis, with either one or two seats coming up for election each year as part of the November general election in a three-year cycle. At an annual reorganization meeting held in January after each election, a Mayor (formally described as Chairperson) and Deputy Mayor are selected by the Township Committee from among its members.

As of 2024, members of the Boonton Township Committee are Mayor Brian Honan (R, term on committee ends December 31, 2026; term as mayor ends 2024), Deputy Mayor William Klingener (R, term on committee ends 2025; term as deputy mayor ends 2024), Thomas R. Donadio (R, 2026), Paul Allieri (R, 2025) and Thomas F. SanFilippo Jr. (R, 2024).

Patricia Collins was chosen in January 2020 by the Township Committee from a list of three candidates nominated by the Republican municipal committee to fill the seat expiring in December 2021 that had been held by Michele Rankin until her resignation from office effective in December 2019.

In December 2018, the Township Committee selected Brian Honan from a list of candidates submitted by the Republican municipal committee to fill the seat expiring in December 2020 that had been vacated the previous month by Robert A. Rizzo, who resigned from office; Honan served on an interim basis until the November 2019 general election, when he was elected to serve the balance of the term of office.

=== Federal, state and county representation ===
Boonton Township is located in the 11th Congressional District and is part of New Jersey's 25th state legislative district.

For the 119th United States Congress, New Jersey's 11th congressional district is represented by Analilia Mejia (D, Glen Ridge) who was elected in a 2026 special election to serve for the remainder of the Congress following the resignation Mikie Sherrill (D, Montclair), who was elected Governor of New Jersey in 2025. New Jersey is represented in the United States Senate by Democrats Cory Booker (Newark, term ends 2027) and Andy Kim (Moorestown, term ends 2031).

For the 2026–2027 session, the 25th legislative district of the New Jersey Legislature is represented in the State Senate by Anthony M. Bucco (R, Boonton Township) and in the General Assembly by Aura K. Dunn (R, Mendham Borough) and Marisa Sweeney (D, Morristown).

Morris County is governed by a Board of County Commissioners comprised of seven members who are elected at-large in partisan elections to three-year terms on a staggered basis, with either one or three seats up for election each year as part of the November general election. Actual day-to-day operation of departments is supervised by County Administrator Deena Leary.

As of 2026, Morris County's Commissioners (with all terms ending December 31) are Director Stephen H. Shaw (R, Mountain Lakes, 2027), Deputy Director John Krickus (R, Washington Township, 2027), Douglas Cabana (R, Boonton Township, 2028), Thomas J. Mastrangelo (R, Montville, 2028), Christine Myers (R, Harding Township, 2028), Tayfun Selen (R, Chatham Township, 2026), and Deborah Smith (R, Denville Township, 2027).

The county's constitutional officers are County Clerk Ann F. Grossi (R, Parsippany–Troy Hills, 2028), Sheriff James M. Gannon (R, Boonton Township, 2025) and Surrogate Heather Darling (R, Roxbury, 2029).

=== Elections ===
United States presidential election results for Boonton Township 2024 2020 2016 2012 2008 2004
Year	Republican		Democratic		Third party(ies)	
Year	No.	%	No.	%	No.	%
2024	1,574	56.99%	1,119	40.51%	69	2.50%
2020	1,568	54.16%	1,293	44.66%	34	1.17%
2016	1,422	56.88%	989	39.56%	89	3.56%
2012	1,430	61.43%	870	37.37%	28	1.20%
2008	1,439	59.59%	949	39.30%	27	1.12%
2004	1,480	62.58%	860	36.36%	25	1.06%

As of March 23, 2011, there were a total of 3,061 registered voters in Boonton Township, of which 558 (18.2%) were registered as Democrats, 1,386 (45.3%) were registered as Republicans and 1,114 (36.4%) were registered as Unaffiliated. There were 3 voters registered as Libertarians or Greens.

In the 2012 presidential election, Republican Mitt Romney received 61.4% of the vote (1,430 cast), ahead of Democrat Barack Obama with 37.4% (870 votes), and other candidates with 1.2% (28 votes), among the 2,341 ballots cast by the township's 3,185 registered voters (13 ballots were spoiled), for a turnout of 73.5%. In the 2008 presidential election, Republican John McCain received 59.2% of the vote (1,439 cast), ahead of Democrat Barack Obama with 39.0% (949 votes) and other candidates with 1.1% (27 votes), among the 2,431 ballots cast by the township's 3,199 registered voters, for a turnout of 76.0%. In the 2004 presidential election, Republican George W. Bush received 62.4% of the vote (1,480 ballots cast), outpolling Democrat John Kerry with 36.3% (860 votes) and other candidates with 0.8% (25 votes), among the 2,372 ballots cast by the township's 3,083 registered voters, for a turnout percentage of 76.9.

Gubernatorial election results for Boonton Township
Year	Republican		Democratic		Third party(ies)	
Year	No.	%	No.	%	No.	%
2025	1,353	58.83%	936	40.70%	11	0.48%
2021	1,241	63.84%	691	35.55%	12	0.62%
2017	896	59.61%	585	38.92%	22	1.46%
2013	1,077	75.26%	332	23.20%	22	1.54%
2009	1,126	65.28%	480	27.83%	119	6.90%
2005	1,001	63.92%	530	33.84%	35	2.23%

In the 2013 gubernatorial election, Republican Chris Christie received 75.3% of the vote (1,077 cast), ahead of Democrat Barbara Buono with 23.2% (332 votes), and other candidates with 1.5% (22 votes), among the 1,454 ballots cast by the township's 3,199 registered voters (23 ballots were spoiled), for a turnout of 45.5%. In the 2009 gubernatorial election, Republican Chris Christie received 64.9% of the vote (1,126 ballots cast), ahead of Democrat Jon Corzine with 27.7% (480 votes), Independent Chris Daggett with 6.2% (107 votes) and other candidates with 0.7% (12 votes), among the 1,735 ballots cast by the township's 3,131 registered voters, yielding a 55.4% turnout.

United States Senate election results for Boonton Township1
Year	Republican		Democratic		Third party(ies)	
Year	No.	%	No.	%	No.	%
2024	1,560	59.07%	1,023	38.74%	58	2.20%
2018	1,321	59.72%	819	37.03%	72	3.25%
2012	1,331	61.76%	795	36.89%	29	1.35%
2006	991	62.68%	553	34.98%	37	2.34%

United States Senate election results for Boonton Township2
Year	Republican		Democratic		Third party(ies)	
Year	No.	%	No.	%	No.	%
2020	1,608	56.58%	1,208	42.51%	26	0.91%
2014	745	61.67%	440	36.42%	23	1.90%
2013	624	62.03%	378	37.57%	4	0.40%
2008	1,409	63.90%	753	34.15%	43	1.95%

== Education ==
The Boonton Township School District serves students in public school for pre-kindergarten through eighth grade at Rockaway Valley School. As of the 2022–23 school year, the district, comprised of one school, had an enrollment of 394 students and 40.5 classroom teachers (on an FTE basis), for a student–teacher ratio of 9.7:1.

For ninth through twelfth grades, public school students attend Mountain Lakes High School, in Mountain Lakes, as part of a sending/receiving relationship agreement in place with the Mountain Lakes Schools. As of the 2022–23 school year, the high school had an enrollment of 569 students and 60.0 classroom teachers (on an FTE basis), for a student–teacher ratio of 9.5:1.

== Transportation ==
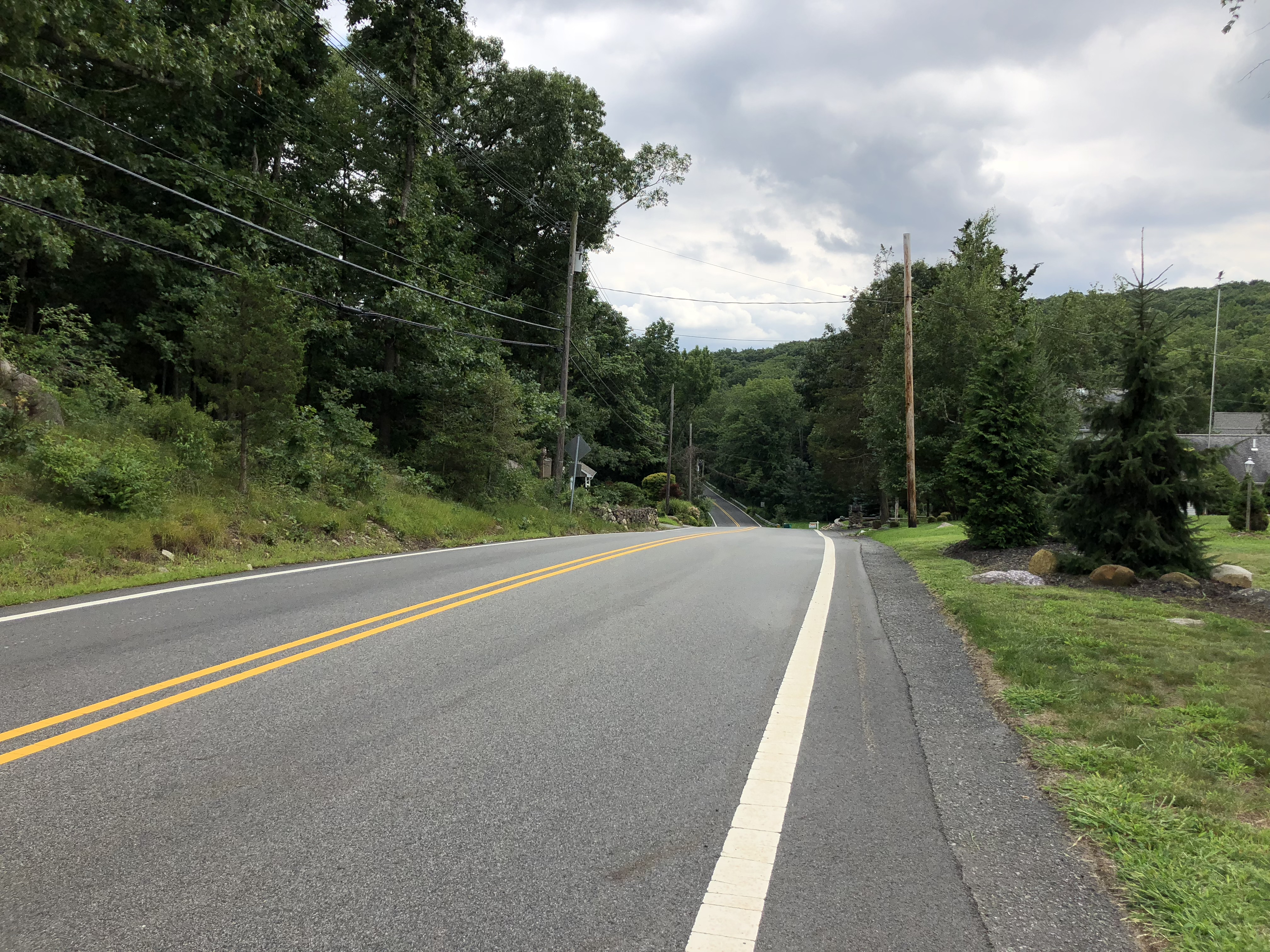
County Route 511 in Boonton Township

As of May 2010, the township had a total of 35.59 miles (57.28 km) of roadways, of which 28.97 miles (46.62 km) were maintained by the municipality and 6.62 miles (10.65 km) by Morris County.

No Interstate, U.S. or state highways pass through Boonton Township. The most significant road directly serving the township is County Route 511. However, Interstate 287 and U.S. Route 202 are accessible in neighboring municipalities.

The Boonton station provides train service on the NJ Transit Montclair-Boonton Line with service to Newark Broad Street Station, Penn Station New York and Hoboken Terminal.

== Notable people ==
People who were born in, residents of, or otherwise closely associated with Boonton Township include:

- Anthony M. Bucco (born 1962), member of the New Jersey Senate from the New Jersey's 25th legislative district since his father's death in 2019
- Anthony R. Bucco (1938–2019), member of the New Jersey Senate who represented the 25th Legislative District from 1998 until his death
- John H. Dorsey (1937–2018), attorney and politician who served in the New Jersey Legislature from 1976 to 1994
- Mike Michalowicz (born 1970), author and entrepreneur
- Kelly Tripucka (born 1959), former professional basketball player who played for ten seasons in the NBA
- Travis Tripucka (born 1989), long snapper who was signed by the St. Louis Rams as an undrafted free agent in 2012, and is the son of Kelly Tripucka
