= Mountain Lakes, New Jersey =

Borough in Morris County, New Jersey, US

- Borough
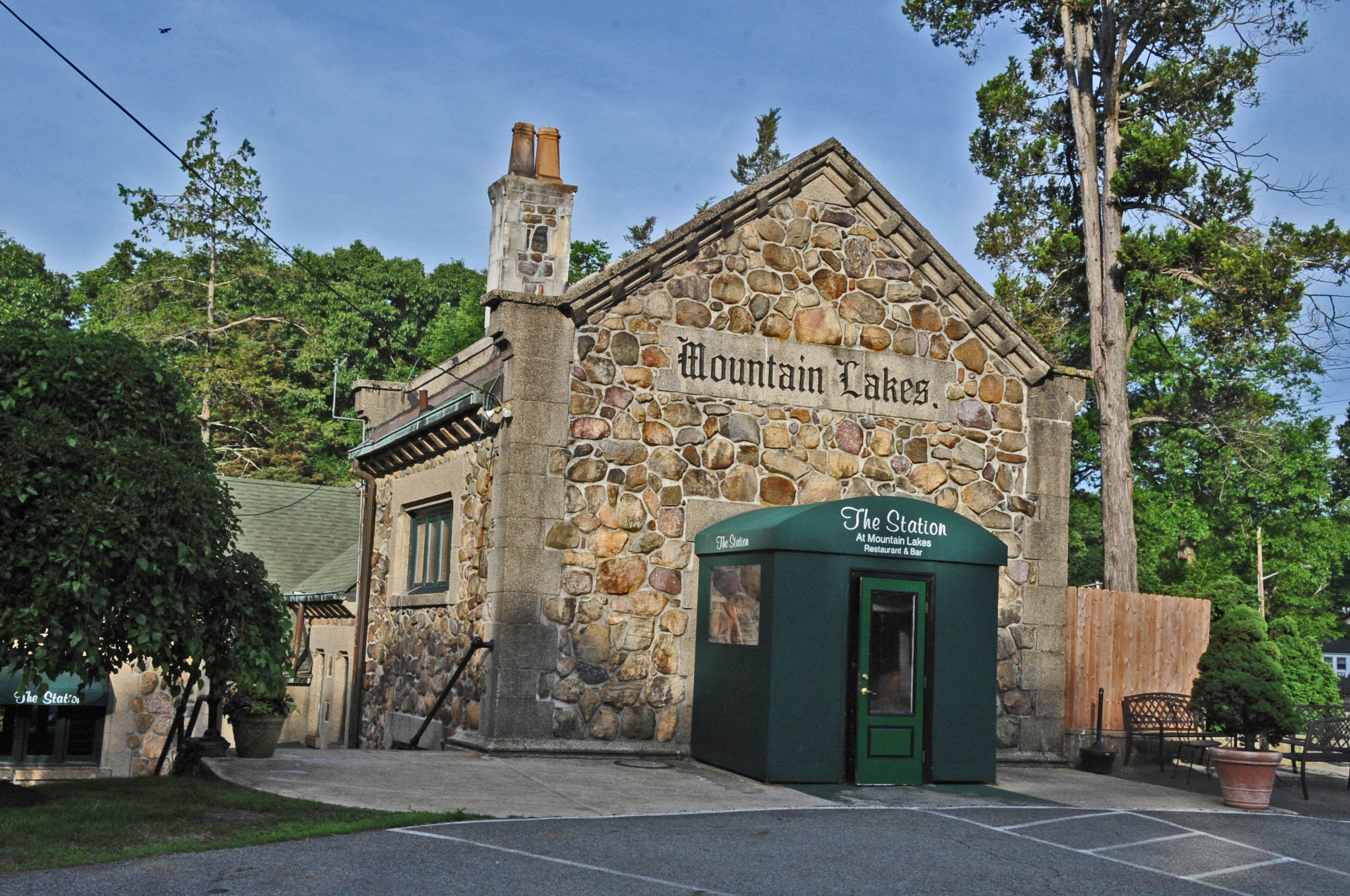
- The Mountain Lakes train station, owned by New Jersey Transit, is located in the Mountain Lakes Historic District.

- Seal

- Location of Mountain Lakes in Morris County highlighted in red (right). Inset map: Location of Morris County in New Jersey highlighted in orange (left).

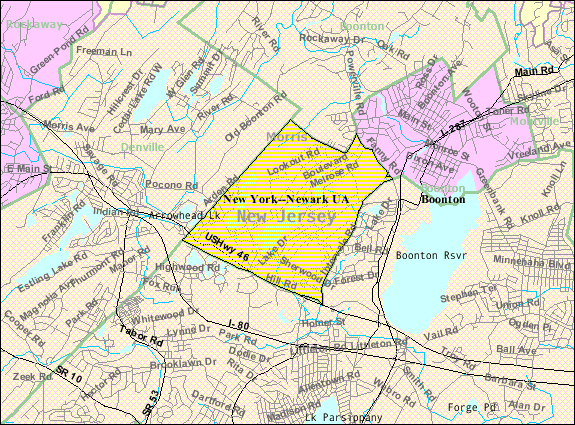
- Census Bureau map of Mountain Lakes, New Jersey

- Location in Morris County Location in New Jersey Location in the United States
- Coordinates: 40.890853°N 74.442032°W
- Country: United States
- State: New Jersey
- County: Morris
- Incorporated: April 29, 1924

Government
  - Type: Faulkner Act (council–manager)
  - Body: Borough Council
  - Mayor: Lauren Barnett (D, term ends December 31, 2025)
  - Manager: Mitchell Stern
  - Municipal clerk: Cara Fox

Area
  - Total: 2.91 sq mi (7.53 km^{2})
  - Land: 2.64 sq mi (6.85 km^{2})
  - Water: 0.27 sq mi (0.69 km^{2}) 9.11%
  - Rank: 340th of 565 in state 27th of 39 in county
- Elevation: 489 ft (149 m)

Population (2020)
  - Total: 4,472
  - Estimate (2023): 4,608
  - Rank: 396th of 565 in state 32nd of 39 in county
  - Density: 1,693.2/sq mi (653.7/km^{2})
  - Rank: 321st of 565 in state 18th of 39 in county
- Time zone: UTC−05:00 (Eastern (EST))
  - Summer (DST): UTC−04:00 (Eastern (EDT))
- ZIP Code: 07046
- Area code: 973
- FIPS code: 3402748480
- GNIS feature ID: 0885310
- Website: www.mtnlakes.org
- Mountain Lakes Historic District
- U.S. National Register of Historic Places
- U.S. Historic district
- Location within Morris County, New Jersey
- Location: Roughly bounded by Pocono Road, Denville Township line, Fanny Road, and RR Tracks, Mountain Lakes, New Jersey
- Area: 1,397 acres (565 ha)
- Built: 1908
- Architects: Hapgood, Herbert J.; Holton, Arthur T.
- Architectural style: Late 19th And Early 20th Century American Movements, Late 19th And 20th Century Revivals
- NRHP reference No.: 05000963
- Added to NRHP: September 7, 2005

Mountain Lakes is a borough in Morris County, in the U.S. state of New Jersey, and a suburb of New York City. As of the 2020 United States census, the borough's population was 4,472, an increase of 312 (+7.5%) from the 2010 census count of 4,160, which in turn had reflected a decline of 96 (−2.3%) from the 4,256 recorded at the 2000 census.

Originally a planned community, the borough was named for a pair of lakes which served to distinguish Mountain Lakes as "the first year-round residential lake community in northwestern New Jersey." Mountain Lakes was incorporated as a borough by an act of the New Jersey Legislature on March 3, 1924, from portions of Boonton Township and Hanover Township, subject to the results of a referendum passed on April 29, 1924.

The borough has been one of the state's highest-income communities. In the 2013–2017 American Community Survey, Mountain Lakes had a median household income of $175,556 (ranked 12th in the state) and included 45.6% of households earning more than $200,000 annually.

In 2010, Forbes.com listed Mountain Lakes as 210th in its listing of "America's Most Expensive ZIP Codes", with a median home price of $1,045,401.

Mountain Lakes ranked among the highest annual property tax bills in New Jersey, and was the highest in Morris County, at $20,471 in 2018, compared to a statewide average of $8,767. New Jersey Monthly magazine ranked Mountain Lakes as the 26th best place to live in New Jersey in its rankings of the "New Jersey's Top Towns 2011–2012" in New Jersey.

The Mountain Lakes station provides NJ Transit commuter train service. The station offers service on the Montclair-Boonton Line and is the first train station heading eastbound not concurrent with the nearby Morris & Essex Lines.

== History ==
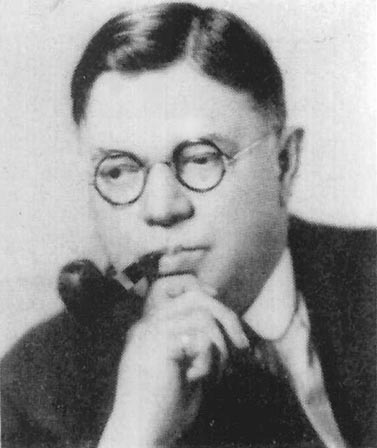
Town founder Herbert Hapgood

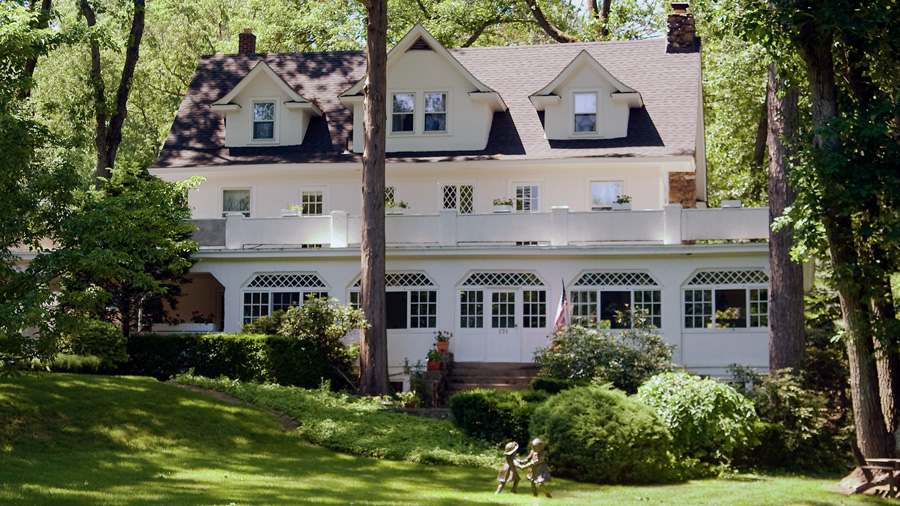
Example of a Hapgood home

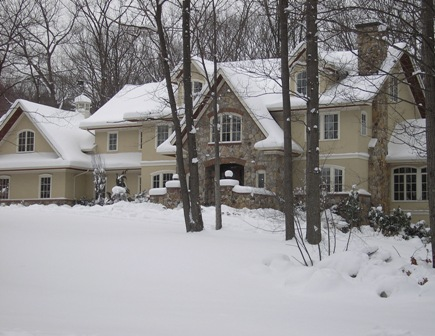
Modern home designed to emulate the look of historic Hapgoods

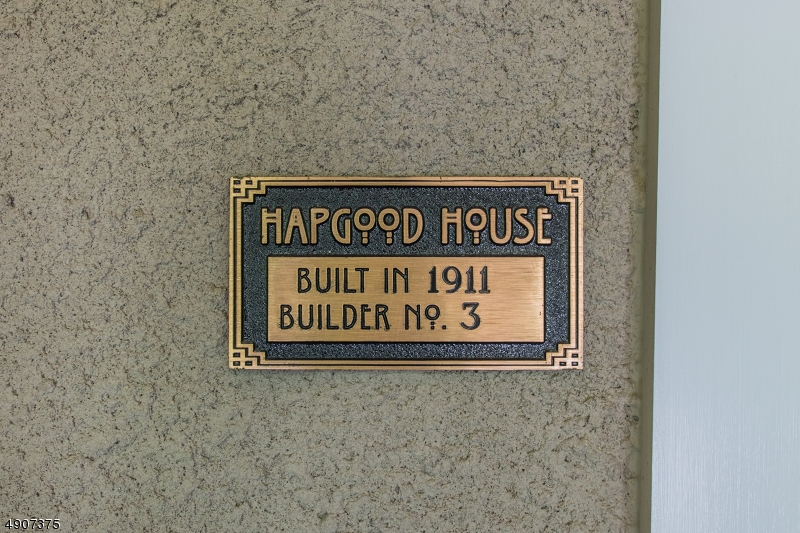
Historic Hapgood House plaque provided by the Mountain Lakes Historic Preservation

Mountain Lakes was originally a planned community, founded in 1910 by Herbert Hapgood. The entire face of the community changed from a wilderness of Dutch and English properties to a planned suburban community of large stucco houses now affectionately known as "Hapgoods." During this single decade, the natural and architectural character of Mountain Lakes was developed. Hapgood was particularly influenced by the Arts and Crafts movement, at the height of its popularity in 1910 when he started building.

Lawrence W. Luellen, inventor of the Dixie Cup, became the community's first resident when he moved to his new home in March 1911.

The Hapgood model homes were early forerunners of the modern development, but each house was modified to suit individual tastes. To the basic styles of these houses, Hapgood added colonial and craftsman features. He reversed floor plans, and interchanged architectural details. By the end of 1912, two hundred Hapgood homes were sold and occupied and in 1914 saw the formation of the Mountain Lakes Club. By 1923, approximately six hundred stucco houses were built to meet the overwhelming demand. Mountain Lakes became an independent municipality in 1924.

The United States Navy's Underwater Sound Reference Laboratories was located in Mountain Lakes during World War II.

Mountain Lakes had a discriminatory "gentleman's agreement" from its inception up through the 1960s, preventing African-Americans, Jews, Latinos, Catholics, and other "undesirable groupings" from living there. While this was abandoned in recent years, the town still has a less diverse population than the rest of New Jersey, or Morris County.

Mountain Lakes is home to the historic Grimes Homestead, an 18th-century home that served as a way station on the Underground Railroad.

== Geography ==
According to the United States Census Bureau, the borough had a total area of 2.91 square miles (7.53 km^{2}), including 2.64 square miles (6.84 km^{2}) of land, and 0.27 square miles (0.69 km^{2}) of water (9.11%).

Part of The Tourne county park is in Mountain Lakes.

The borough borders Parsippany-Troy Hills to the east and south, the town of Boonton to the northeast, Boonton Township to the northwest, and Denville to the west, all of which are located in Morris County.

=== Lakes ===
Man-made lakes in Mountain Lakes include Birchwood Lake, Crystal Lake, Mountain Lake, Shadow Lake, Sunset Lake, Wildwood Lake, and Cove Lake. There are town private swimming beaches in Birchwood Lake, and Mountain Lake. The Mountain Lakes Club is located on the northern end of Mountain Lake.

Beaches are open from sunrise to sunset, and facilities are available between the hours of 10 am and 6 pm every day between the months of June and August, with beach badges purchased at the borough hall. Beach badges are available to Mountain Lakes residents only.

== Demographics ==
Historical population
Census	Pop.	Note	%±
1930	2,132		—
1940	2,205		3.4%
1950	2,806		27.3%
1960	4,037		43.9%
1970	4,739		17.4%
1980	4,153		−12.4%
1990	3,847		−7.4%
2000	4,256		10.6%
2010	4,160		−2.3%
2020	4,472		7.5%
2023 (est.)	4,608	▲	3.0%
Population sources:1930 1940–2000 2000; 2010 2020

According to The New York Times, a diverse group of foreigners has been moving to the borough, including Germans, Chinese, South Africans, and New Zealanders.

=== 2020 census ===
As of the 2020 census, Mountain Lakes had a population of 4,472. The median age was 41.7 years. 29.8% of residents were under the age of 18 and 12.1% of residents were 65 years of age or older. For every 100 females there were 98.3 males, and for every 100 females age 18 and over there were 95.2 males age 18 and over.

100.0% of residents lived in urban areas, while 0.0% lived in rural areas.

There were 1,376 households in Mountain Lakes, of which 50.7% had children under the age of 18 living in them. Of all households, 78.0% were married-couple households, 6.5% were households with a male householder and no spouse or partner present, and 13.0% were households with a female householder and no spouse or partner present. About 9.2% of all households were made up of individuals and 6.0% had someone living alone who was 65 years of age or older.

There were 1,429 housing units, of which 3.7% were vacant. The homeowner vacancy rate was 1.4% and the rental vacancy rate was 7.2%.

Racial composition as of the 2020 census
Race	Number	Percent
White	3,339	74.7%
Black or African American	19	0.4%
American Indian and Alaska Native	6	0.1%
Asian	697	15.6%
Native Hawaiian and Other Pacific Islander	1	0.0%
Some other race	41	0.9%
Two or more races	369	8.3%
Hispanic or Latino (of any race)	247	5.5%

=== 2010 census ===
The 2010 United States census counted 4,160 people, 1,313 households, and 1,144 families in the borough. The population density was 1,590.3 per square mile (614.0/km^{2}). There were 1,363 housing units at an average density of 521.1 per square mile (201.2/km^{2}). The racial makeup was 89.57% (3,726) White, 0.36% (15) Black or African American, 0.07% (3) Native American, 7.64% (318) Asian, 0.00% (0) Pacific Islander, 0.34% (14) from other races, and 2.02% (84) from two or more races. Hispanic or Latino of any race were 2.55% (106) of the population.

Of the 1,313 households, 53.3% had children under the age of 18; 78.9% were married couples living together; 6.0% had a female householder with no husband present and 12.9% were non-families. Of all households, 11.3% were made up of individuals and 5.5% had someone living alone who was 65 years of age or older. The average household size was 3.17 and the average family size was 3.44.

34.9% of the population were under the age of 18, 4.8% from 18 to 24, 16.8% from 25 to 44, 33.5% from 45 to 64, and 10.1% who were 65 years of age or older. The median age was 41.8 years. For every 100 females, the population had 99.9 males. For every 100 females ages 18 and older there were 93.5 males.

The Census Bureau's 2006–2010 American Community Survey showed that (in 2010 inflation-adjusted dollars) median household income was $155,139 (with a margin of error of +/− $20,127) and the median family income was $181,600 (+/− $26,906). Males had a median income of $144,688 (+/− $24,336) versus $77,734 (+/− $26,273) for females. The per capita income for the borough was $75,525 (+/− $11,503). About 2.1% of families and 2.1% of the population were below the poverty line, including 2.0% of those under age 18 and 5.2% of those age 65 or over.

Based on data from the 2006-2010 American Community Survey, Mountain Lakes had a per capita income of $75,525 (ranked 17th in the state), compared to per capita income in Morris County of $47,342 and statewide of $34,858.

=== 2000 census ===
As of the 2000 United States census there were 4,256 people, 1,330 households, and 1,186 families residing in the borough. The population density was 1,593.0 inhabitants per square mile (615.1/km^{2}). There were 1,357 housing units at an average density of 507.9 per square mile (196.1/km^{2}). The racial makeup of the borough was 93.05% White, 0.38% African American, 5.17% Asian, 0.07% Pacific Islander, 0.52% from other races, and 0.82% from two or more races. Hispanic or Latino of any race were 1.69% of the population.

There were 1,330 households, out of which 53.7% had children under the age of 18 living with them, 83.3% were married couples living together, 3.8% had a female householder with no husband present, and 10.8% were non-families. 9.2% of all households were made up of individuals, and 4.1% had someone living alone who was 65 years of age or older. The average household size was 3.20 and the average family size was 3.41.

In the borough the population was spread out, with 35.7% under the age of 18, 3.1% from 18 to 24, 23.4% from 25 to 44, 28.7% from 45 to 64, and 9.1% who were 65 years of age or older. The median age was 39 years. For every 100 females, there were 99.2 males. For every 100 females age 18 and over, there were 94.0 males.

The median income for a household in the borough was $141,757, and the median income for a family was $153,227. Males had a median income of $100,000+ versus $61,098 for females. The per capita income for the borough was $65,086. About 1.4% of families and 2.0% of the population were below the poverty line, including 0.7% of those under age 18 and 2.3% of those age 65 or over.

Mountain Lakes was ranked in 2000 as the 13th highest-income community in the state of New Jersey based on per capita income, after having been ranked eighth a decade earlier. In 2000, the township's median household income ranked third in the state and the highest in Morris County. Per capita income increased by 25.4% from the previous census, with income growth ranked 530th among the state's 566 municipalities.

== Government ==
=== Local government ===
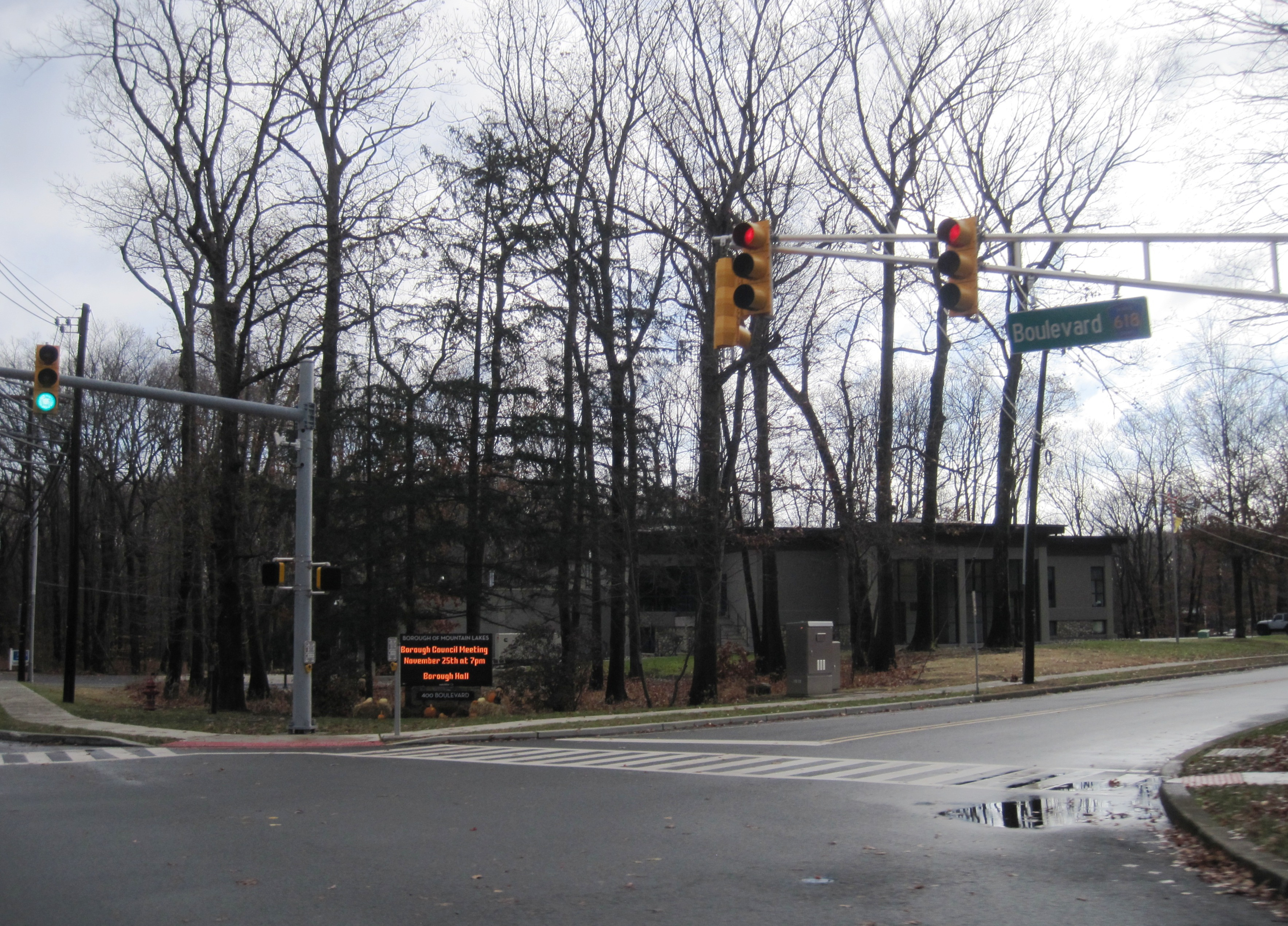
Mountain Lakes Municipal Building

Mountain Lakes operates within the Faulkner Act, formally known as the Optional Municipal Charter Law, under the Council-Manager form of municipal government (Plan E), implemented based on the recommendations of a Charter Study Commission as of January 1, 1975. The borough is one of 42 municipalities (of the 564) statewide that use this form of government. The Borough Council is comprised of seven members, who are elected at-large for staggered four-year terms of office on a partisan basis, with either three or four seats coming up for vote as part of the November general election in even-numbered years. The Mayor and Deputy Mayor are chosen by the members of the Council from among its members at a reorganization meeting held each year during the first week in January.

As of 2025, members of the Mountain Lakes Borough Council are Mayor Lauren Barnett (D, term on committee ends December 31, 2028; term as mayor ends December 31, 2025), Deputy Mayor Melissa Muilenburg (D, term on committee ends December 31, 2026; term as deputy mayor ends December 31, 2025), Chris Cannon (D, 2026), Joshua Howley (D, 2028), Thomas Menard (D, 2026), Khizar Sheikh (D, 2028), and Angela Tsai (D, 2028).

=== Federal, state and county representation ===
Mountain Lakes is located in the 11th Congressional District and is part of New Jersey's 26th state legislative district.

For the 119th United States Congress, New Jersey's 11th congressional district is represented by Analilia Mejia (D, Glen Ridge) who was elected in a 2026 special election to serve for the remainder of the Congress following the resignation Mikie Sherrill (D, Montclair), who was elected Governor of New Jersey in 2025. New Jersey is represented in the United States Senate by Democrats Cory Booker (Newark, term ends 2027) and Andy Kim (Moorestown, term ends 2031).

For the 2026–2027 session, the 26th legislative district of the New Jersey Legislature is represented in the State Senate by Joseph Pennacchio (R, Rockaway Township) and in the General Assembly by Brian Bergen (R, Denville Township) and Jay Webber (R, Morris Plains).

Morris County is governed by a Board of County Commissioners comprised of seven members who are elected at-large in partisan elections to three-year terms on a staggered basis, with either one or three seats up for election each year as part of the November general election. Actual day-to-day operation of departments is supervised by County Administrator Deena Leary.

As of 2026, Morris County's Commissioners (with all terms ending December 31) are Director Stephen H. Shaw (R, Mountain Lakes, 2027), Deputy Director John Krickus (R, Washington Township, 2027), Douglas Cabana (R, Boonton Township, 2028), Thomas J. Mastrangelo (R, Montville, 2028), Christine Myers (R, Harding Township, 2028), Tayfun Selen (R, Chatham Township, 2026), and Deborah Smith (R, Denville Township, 2027).

The county's constitutional officers are County Clerk Ann F. Grossi (R, Parsippany–Troy Hills, 2028), Sheriff James M. Gannon (R, Boonton Township, 2028) and Surrogate Heather Darling (R, Roxbury, 2029).

=== Politics ===
United States presidential election results for Mountain Lakes 2024 2020 2016 2012 2008 2004
Year	Republican		Democratic		Third party(ies)	
Year	No.	%	No.	%	No.	%
2024	1,032	39.12%	1,540	58.38%	66	2.50%
2020	1,055	36.94%	1,751	61.31%	50	1.75%
2016	1,021	41.90%	1,300	53.34%	116	4.76%
2012	1,262	58.05%	893	41.08%	19	0.87%
2008	1,173	49.35%	1,177	49.52%	27	1.14%
2004	1,299	55.35%	1,027	43.76%	21	0.89%

As of March 2011, there were a total of 2,964 registered voters in Mountain Lakes, of which 715 (24.1%) were registered as Democrats, 975 (32.9%) were registered as Republicans and 1,271 (42.9%) were registered as Unaffiliated. There were 3 voters registered as Libertarians or Greens.

Gubernatorial election results for Mountain Lakes
Year	Republican		Democratic		Third party(ies)	
Year	No.	%	No.	%	No.	%
2025	932	42.42%	1,255	57.12%	10	0.46%
2021	840	45.85%	976	53.28%	16	0.87%
2017	713	49.51%	708	49.17%	19	1.32%
2013	935	71.37%	349	26.64%	26	1.98%
2009	937	57.24%	530	32.38%	170	10.38%
2005	843	55.24%	650	42.60%	33	2.16%

In the 2012 presidential election, Republican Mitt Romney received 58.0% of the vote (1,262 cast), ahead of Democrat Barack Obama with 41.1% (893 votes), and other candidates with 0.9% (19 votes), among the 2,184 ballots cast by the borough's 3,125 registered voters (10 ballots were spoiled), for a turnout of 69.9%. In the 2008 presidential election, Democrat Barack Obama received 49.2% of the vote (1,177 cast), ahead of Republican John McCain with 49.1% (1,173 votes) and other candidates with 1.1% (27 votes), among the 2,391 ballots cast by the borough's 3,103 registered voters, for a turnout of 77.1%. In the 2004 presidential election, Republican George W. Bush received 55.1% of the vote (1,299 ballots cast), outpolling Democrat John Kerry with 43.6% (1,027 votes) and other candidates with 0.7% (21 votes), among the 2,356 ballots cast by the borough's 3,018 registered voters, for a turnout percentage of 78.1.

In the 2013 gubernatorial election, Republican Chris Christie received 71.4% of the vote (935 cast), ahead of Democrat Barbara Buono with 26.6% (349 votes), and other candidates with 2.0% (26 votes), among the 1,325 ballots cast by the borough's 3,036 registered voters (15 ballots were spoiled), for a turnout of 43.6%. In the 2009 gubernatorial election, Republican Chris Christie received 57.1% of the vote (937 ballots cast), ahead of Democrat Jon Corzine with 32.3% (530 votes), Independent Chris Daggett with 10.0% (164 votes) and other candidates with 0.4% (6 votes), among the 1,642 ballots cast by the borough's 3,024 registered voters, yielding a 54.3% turnout.

United States Senate election results for Mountain Lakes1
Year	Republican		Democratic		Third party(ies)	
Year	No.	%	No.	%	No.	%
2024	1,103	42.31%	1,462	56.08%	42	1.61%
2018	1,061	50.02%	1,012	47.71%	48	2.26%
2012	1,161	56.44%	872	42.39%	24	1.17%
2006	923	57.19%	672	41.64%	19	1.18%

United States Senate election results for Mountain Lakes2
Year	Republican		Democratic		Third party(ies)	
Year	No.	%	No.	%	No.	%
2020	1,207	42.40%	1,615	56.73%	25	0.88%
2014	641	54.83%	509	43.54%	19	1.63%
2013	458	49.46%	464	50.11%	4	0.43%
2008	1,237	56.51%	926	42.30%	26	1.19%

== Education ==
The Mountain Lakes Schools serve public school students in pre-kindergarten through twelfth grade. As of the 2020–21 school year, the district, comprised of four schools, had an enrollment of 1,348 students and 146.7 classroom teachers (on an FTE basis), for a student–teacher ratio of 9.2:1. Schools in the district (with 2020–21 enrollment data from the National Center for Education Statistics) are Wildwood Elementary School with 428 students in grades K–5, Briarcliff Middle School with 281 students in grades 6–8, Mountain Lakes High School with 641 students in grades 9–12 and Lake Drive School, a regional school for deaf and hard of hearing students from birth through high school, with students from nearly 100 communities in 12 New Jersey counties. with 57 students in grades Pre-K–8. Students from Boonton Township attend the district's high school as part of a sending/receiving relationship. The school was the 7th-ranked public high school in New Jersey out of 328 schools statewide in New Jersey Monthly magazine's September 2012 cover story on the state's "Top Public High Schools", after being ranked 9th in 2010 out of 322 schools listed.

Mountain Lakes is also home to The Craig School, a private coeducational day school serving students in second through twelfth grade. The school has an enrollment of 130 students split between the Lower/Middle School (grades 2–8), located in Mountain Lakes, and the High School (grades 9–12), in Boonton.

According to Neighborhood Scout, Mountain Lakes is one of New Jersey's most highly educated municipalities, with 85.94% of adults attaining a four-year undergraduate or graduate degree, quadruple the national average of 21.84%, while the percentage of white-collar workers was 98.77%.

== Transportation ==
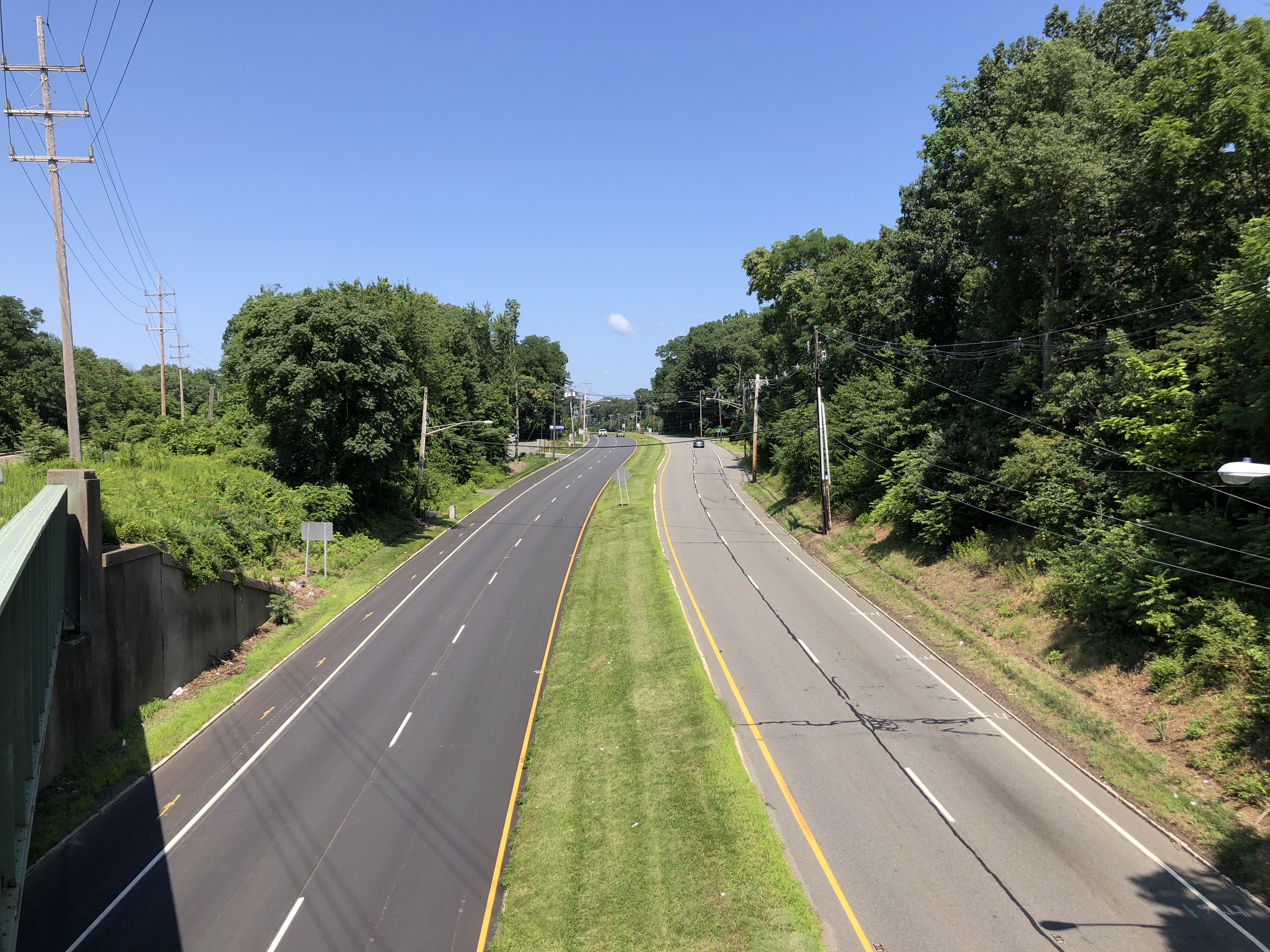
U.S. Route 46 westbound in Mountain Lakes

=== Roads and highways ===
As of May 2010, the borough had a total of 29.38 miles (47.28 km) of roadways, of which 25.86 miles (41.62 km) were maintained by the municipality, 2.32 miles (3.73 km) by Morris County and 1.20 miles (1.93 km) by the New Jersey Department of Transportation.

U.S. Route 46 is the main highway directly serving Mountain Lakes. No other significant roads enter the borough. However, Interstate 80 and Interstate 287 both pass just outside the borough in neighboring Parsippany–Troy Hills.

=== Public transportation ===
NJ Transit offers train service at the Mountain Lakes station on the Montclair-Boonton Line to Hoboken Terminal, and Pennsylvania Station in Midtown Manhattan via Midtown Direct through Newark Broad Street Station.

Lakeland Bus Lines provides service along Route 46 operating between Dover and the Port Authority Bus Terminal in Midtown Manhattan.

== Notable people ==
People who were born in, residents of, or otherwise closely associated with Mountain Lakes include:

- Frederick Walker Castle (1908–1944), general officer in the United States Army Air Forces during World War II, and a recipient of the Medal of Honor
- Liz Claiborne (1929–2007), fashion designer and businesswoman who was the first woman to become chair and CEO of a Fortune 500 company
- Mark Di Ionno (born 1956), journalist and writer
- Harold F. Dodge (1893–1976), one of the principal architects of the science of statistical quality control
- Frederick Elmes (born 1946), cinematographer who won the Independent Spirit Award for Best Cinematography for Wild at Heart and Night on Earth
- Richard M. Freeland (born 1941), President of Northeastern University from 1996 to 2006
- Jeff Friesen (born 1976), professional hockey player who has played for the New Jersey Devils
- Marc Lore (born 1971), billionaire entrepreneur and founder of the e-commerce company Jet
- Claire McCusker Murray (born 1982), lawyer who was associate White House counsel and acting associate attorney general in the United States Department of Justice during the first presidency of Donald Trump
- Mike Michalowicz (born 1970), author and entrepreneur
- Lindsey Munday (born 1984), former collegiate women's lacrosse player who won two national championships at Northwestern and has served since 2013 as the inaugural head coach of the USC Trojans women's lacrosse team
- Brian Platt, City manager of Kansas City, Missouri, since December 2020
- Harry L. Sears (1920–2002), politician who served for 10 years in the New Jersey Legislature, and was indicted on charges of bribery and conspiracy stemming for delivering $200,000 from financier Robert Vesco to Richard Nixon's 1972 presidential campaign
- Matt Taibbi (born 1970), author, journalist and podcaster
- Brittany Underwood (born 1988), actress and singer best known for her role as teenager Langston Wilde on the daytime soap opera One Life to Live
- Adam Zucker (born 1976), sportscaster for CBS Sports and CBS Sports Network
