= Boonton Gorge =

Coordinates: 40°54′27″N 74°25′07″W

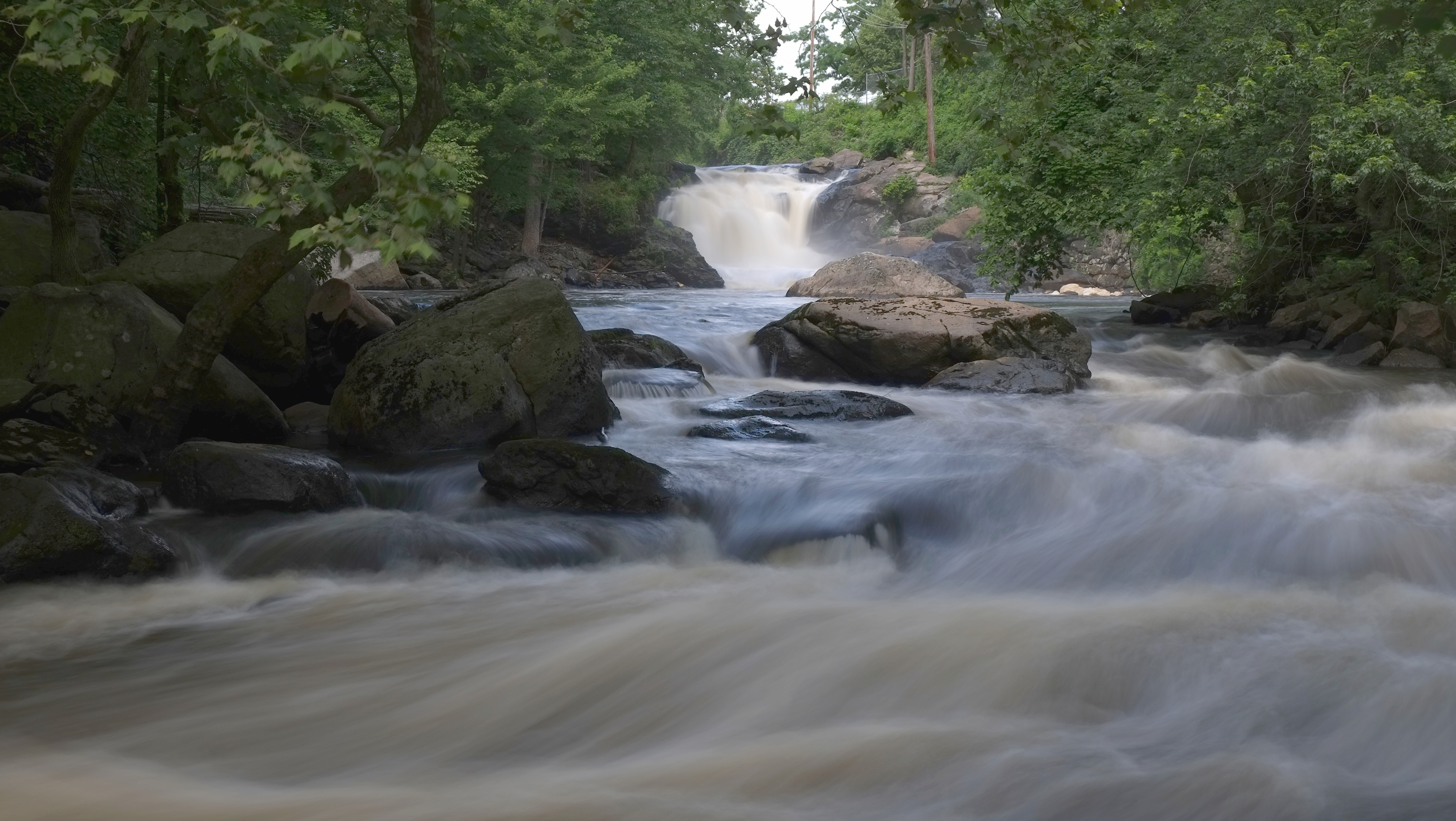
Rockaway River water falls in the gorge

The Boonton Gorge is a river gorge in Boonton, New Jersey where the Rockaway River drops over several waterfalls, and travels for slightly over a mile before emptying into the Jersey City Reservoir.

== Geology ==
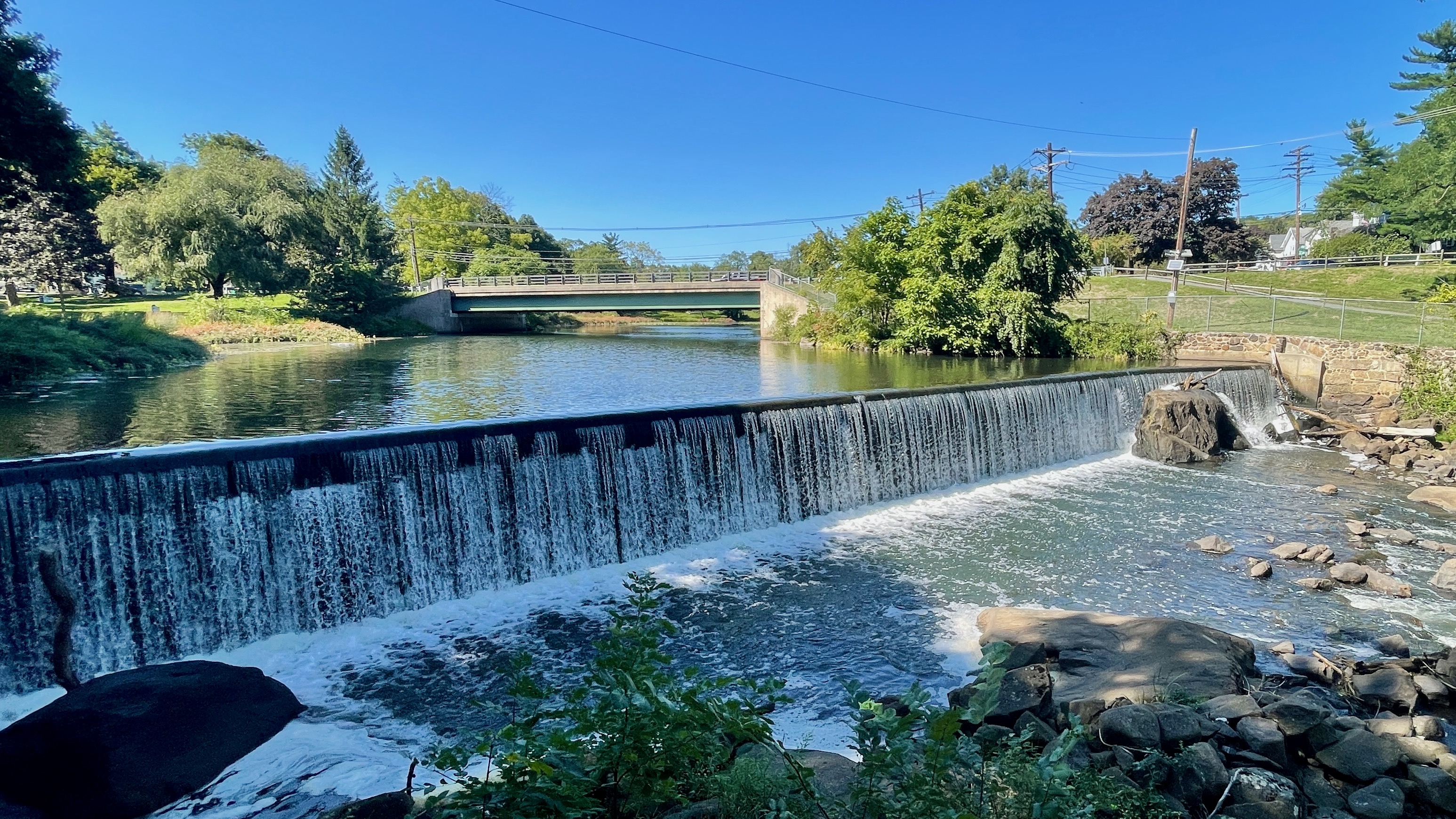
Beginning of the Boonton Gorge, the old Morris Canal dam

The Rockaway River flows through flat plains of Denville and Boonton Township. At this point elevation is 480 feet (150 m) above sea level. The Rockaway River spills over a man-made dam that is six feet high in the town of Boonton. This is the beginning of the Boonton Gorge. This location is the Grace Lord Park at this point. This is where the Rockaway River begins its descent over the Ramapo Fault.

During the late Triassic Period when the North American Plate separated from the African Plate, an aborted rift system was created between the Ramapo Fault and a fault west of Paterson. A half graben was created and was filled with red bed sediment. The land between the Ramapo fault and the fault west of Paterson lowered, thus the Boonton Gorge was born.

The river flows over rocks then cascades over a thirty foot water fall into an oval shaped pool of water with a rock in the center. This pool is about fifty yards long and was a swimming hole until a local ordinance prohibited swimming in 1990 (Ord. 205-5). Then the river drops over a small falls of about seven feet and flows under an arched stone walk-way bridge. This is called the arch bridge. The river flows fast and drops into the second pool of water which is not as wide as the first pool above. The water moves at a medium pace through this oval shaped pool before it starts its non-stop descent to the Jersey City Reservoir. At the end of the second pool, the river narrows. The water picks up speed and starts its descent through iron ore rock. There are several rocks that are pointed, one behind the other. The river goes under a railroad bridge and then slows a little for about a hundred yards, when it drops over a three foot concrete USGS gauging station weir. Soon the river flows under Route 287. The river then follows the east side of Route 287. At this point the river drops forty feet in a quarter of a mile, when it finally empties into the Jersey City Reservoir. The final descent is through a boulder garden.

Before the Jersey City Reservoir was built, a dam was built on the Rockaway River in the late 1920s. The rapids would have continued for another half mile. The rapids would have stopped in Parsippany. At this point the elevation is two hundred twenty feet above sea level. Before the dam was built, the river dropped a total of two hundred sixty feet in a mile and a half.

There is a huge boulder of about fifteen feet high that sits near the arch bridge. It is known locally as "Indian Rock" though it has also been known as "Washington Rock" in the past. There is a huge metal ring at the top of the boulder.

== Hiking ==
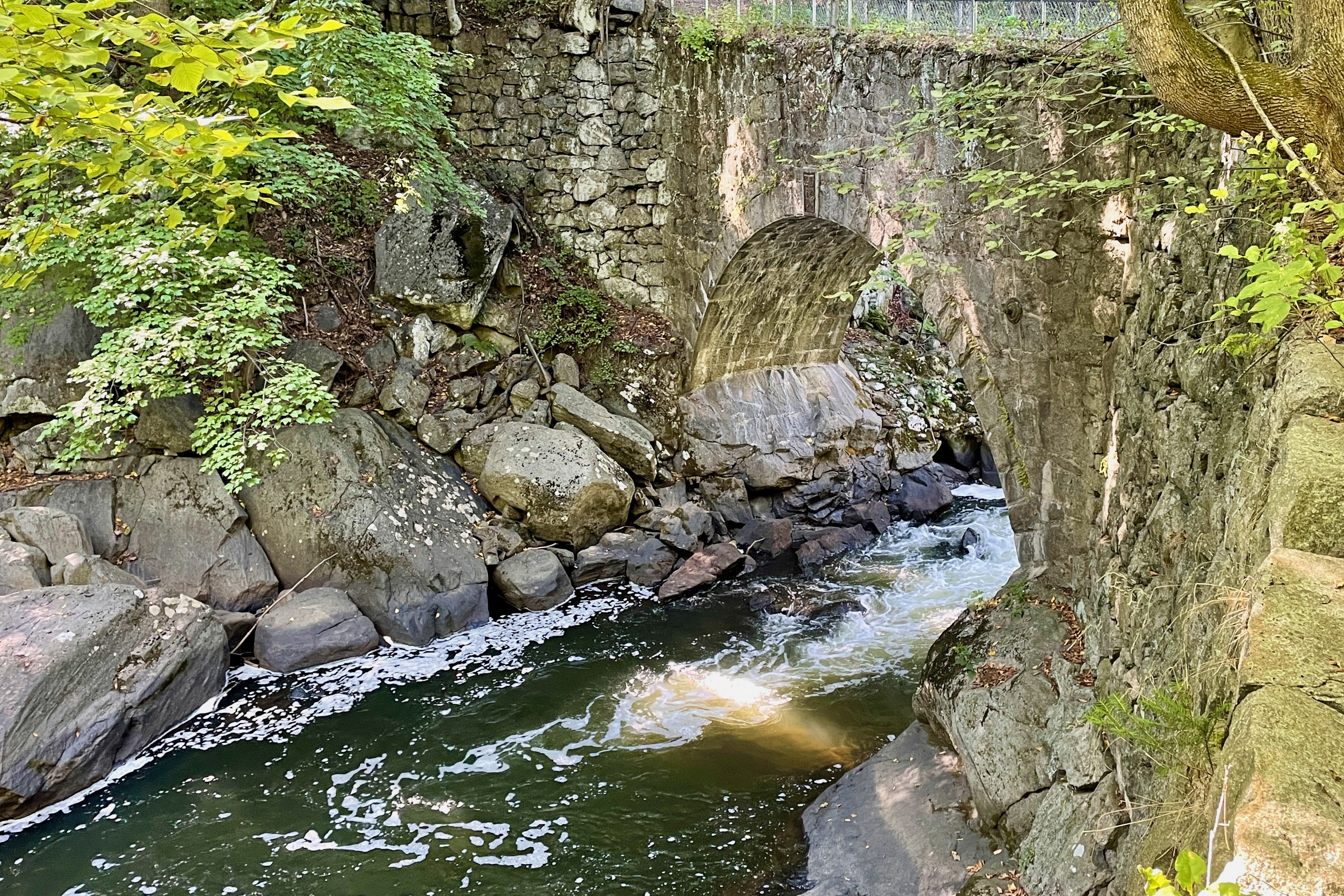
Stone Arch Bridge over the Rockaway River

Boonton Gorge contains a small, but well developed trail system for fishing access as well as recreation. Trails provide views of the river and waterfalls. The trails on either side of the river are connected over the stone arch bridge, built in the 19th century. Historical Markers at some points highlight remains of the local iron industry which operated there in the 19th century. At two points along the trails, near the falls, there are yellow "Riverphones" for calling emergency responders in the event of an accident. These were installed in 1997 as part of a Boy Scout Project and are now administered by the Boonton Fire Dept.

After 2011's Hurricane Irene, the righthand hiking trail (across the river from Main Street) eroded into a 85-ft drop.

== Fishing and canoeing ==
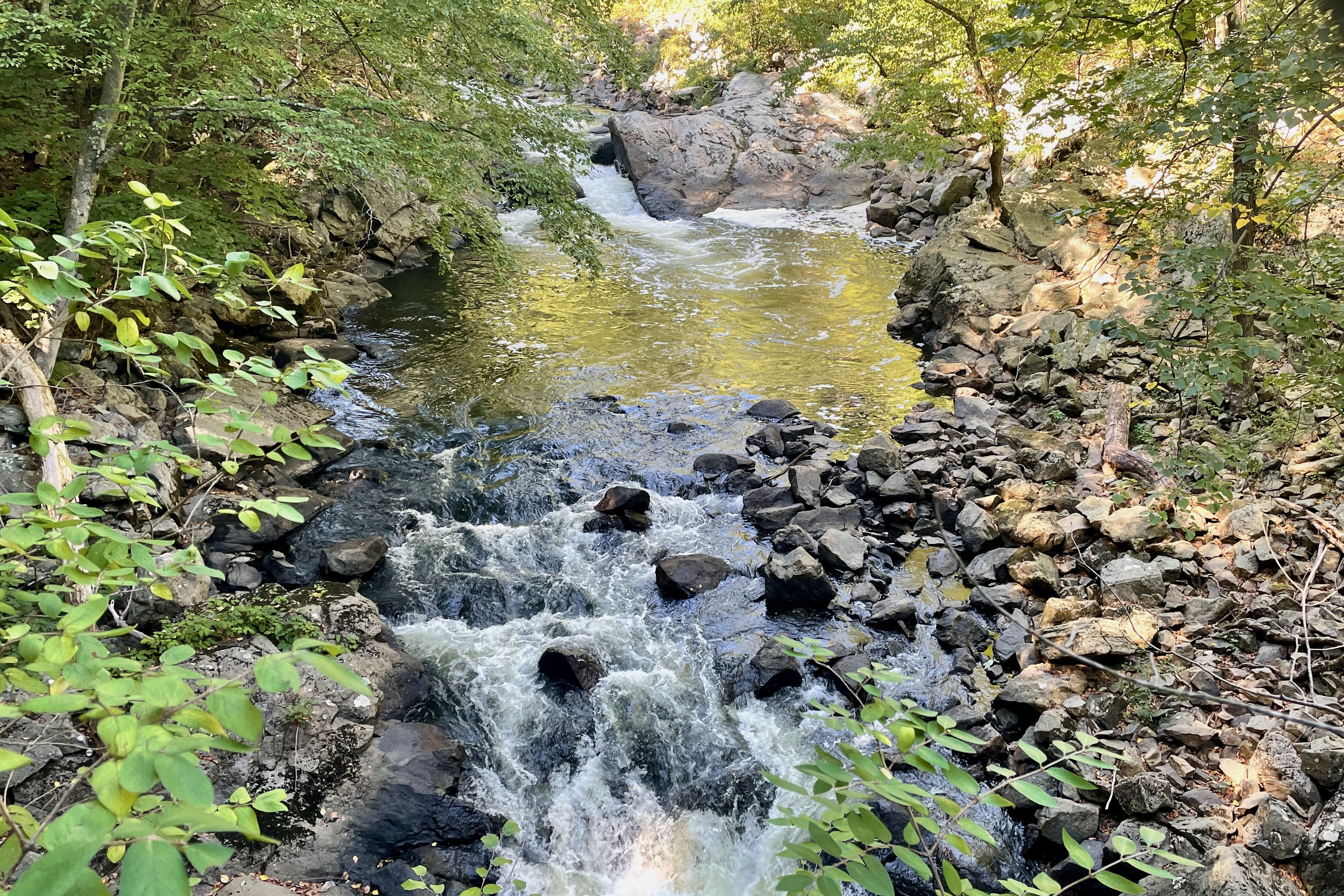
Rapids in the Boonton Gorge above the stone arch bridge

The New Jersey Fish and Game stock the river with rainbow and brown trout several times a year in the spring. Stockings are on Mondays from early April to late May. The water is swift and there are a lot of snags, which can make the fishing challenging.

Though local authorities have recently discouraged kayaking and canoeing in Boonton Gorge, there is no local ordinance or state law prohibiting these activities and it has been a popular class IV-V whitewater run for many years. Whitewater paddlers generally begin above the stone arch bridge and paddle down to the gauging station or the edge of the Jersey City Reservoir. This section of river drops at a rate of approximately 120 feet per mile. The river can be paddled from 2.7 ft (0.82 m). up to 5 ft (1.5 m). on the gauge. At a gauge reading of 2.7-3.2 ft, the river is a shallow and rocky and is rated class 3+ on the International Scale of River Difficulty. From 3.2 to 4 feet (1.2 m) it is rated class 4, and from 4 to 5 feet (1.5 m) on the gage it is rated class 5. At 5 feet (1.5 m) on the gage the river is considered in flood flowing at two thousand cubic feet a second. At higher levels this section of river should only be attempted by paddlers very comfortable on class 5 whitewater. Some local residents view this river section as extremely dangerous, and there have been two reported drownings in recent decades, one a teenage male swimmer in 1990, and the other a young boy who fell into the river at high water in 1996. There do not seem to be any verified reports of drownings involving canoeing, kayaking, tubing or rafting in Boonton Gorge since enthusiasts began running it in the 1970s.

It has been reported that in the very early 1970s, 4 youths went down the gorge in tire tubes and 2 drowned as they were not wearing life vests.
