= Charles Ferren Hopkins =

American Civil War Medal of Honor recipient

Charles Ferren Hopkins Sr.
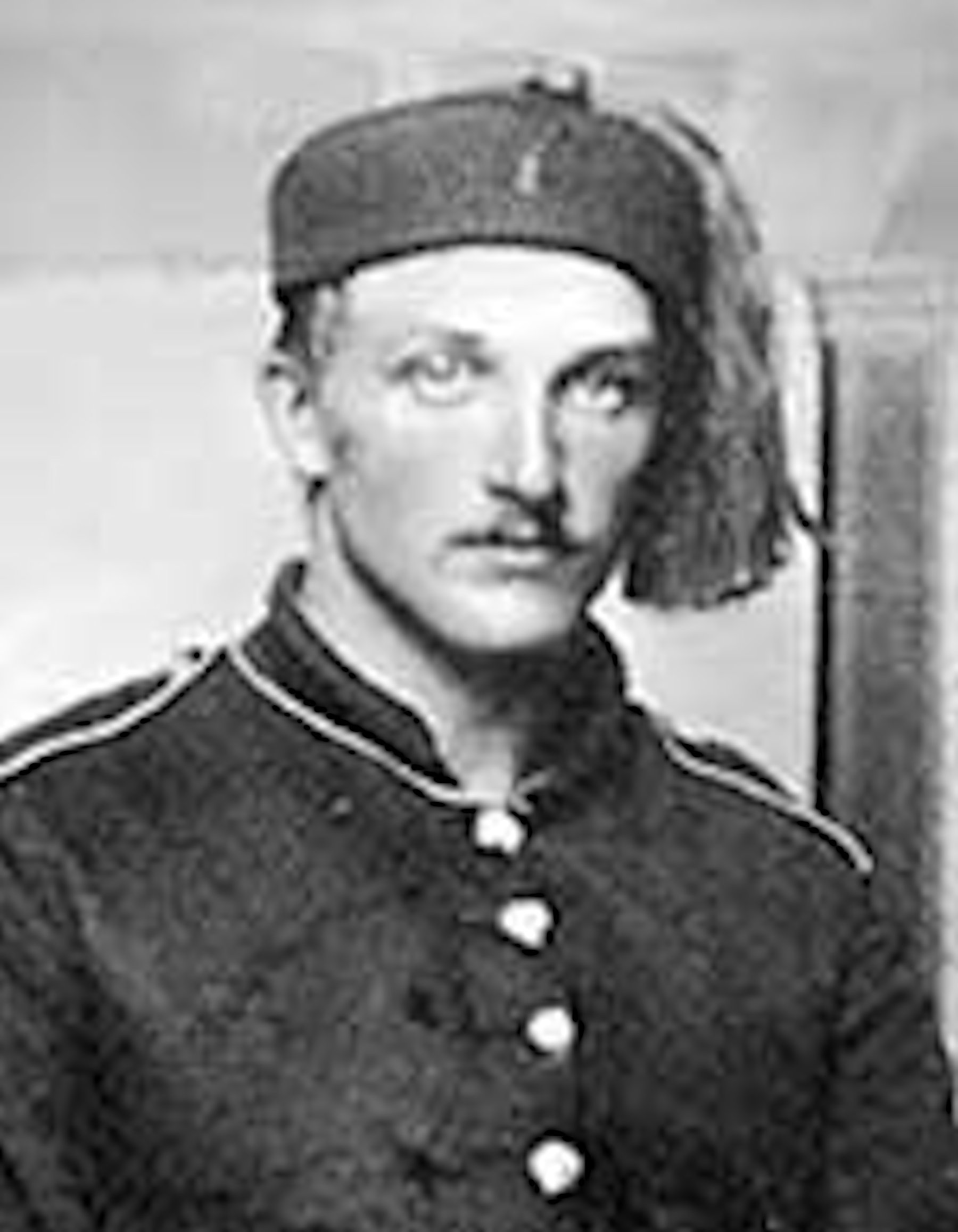
- Hopkins c. 1865
- Born: May 16, 1842; Hope Township, New Jersey, U.S.
- Died: February 14, 1934 (aged 91); Boonton, New Jersey
- Military career
- Branch: Army
- Service years: 1861–1865
- Rank: Sergeant
- Units: Company I, 1st New Jersey Volunteer Infantry
- Conflicts: Battle of Crampton's Gap, Battle of Cold Harbor
- Awards: Medal of Honor

Charles Ferren Hopkins Sr. (May 16, 1842 – February 14, 1934) was the last surviving Union Civil War soldier in New Jersey that was a recipient of the Medal of Honor. He was elected in 1880 as Mayor of Boonton, New Jersey.

== Biography ==
He was born on May 16, 1842, in Hope Township, New Jersey to Nathan Hopkins (1811–1889) and Ann Wilson and he had a brother, John Robertson Hopkins (1844–1885). He served as Mayor of Boonton, New Jersey. He was married in about 1867; his wife died in 1931. Four daughters survived him, and three sons: Emmet, Frank, and Charles Ferren Hopkins Jr. (1884–1956). During the Civil War, he was interred at Andersonville Prison in Georgia, and in 1899 was appointed as a commissioner to the committee planning the New Jersey Monument at Andersonville. He was interred at Greenwood Cemetery, Boonton.

illustration of Hopkins as commissioner for the New Jersey Monument at Andersonville, GA in 1899
