= Arch Bridge from the Boonton Ironworks =

Historic bridge in New Jersey, United States

- U.S. National Register of Historic Places
- U.S. Historic district – Contributing property
- New Jersey Register of Historic Places
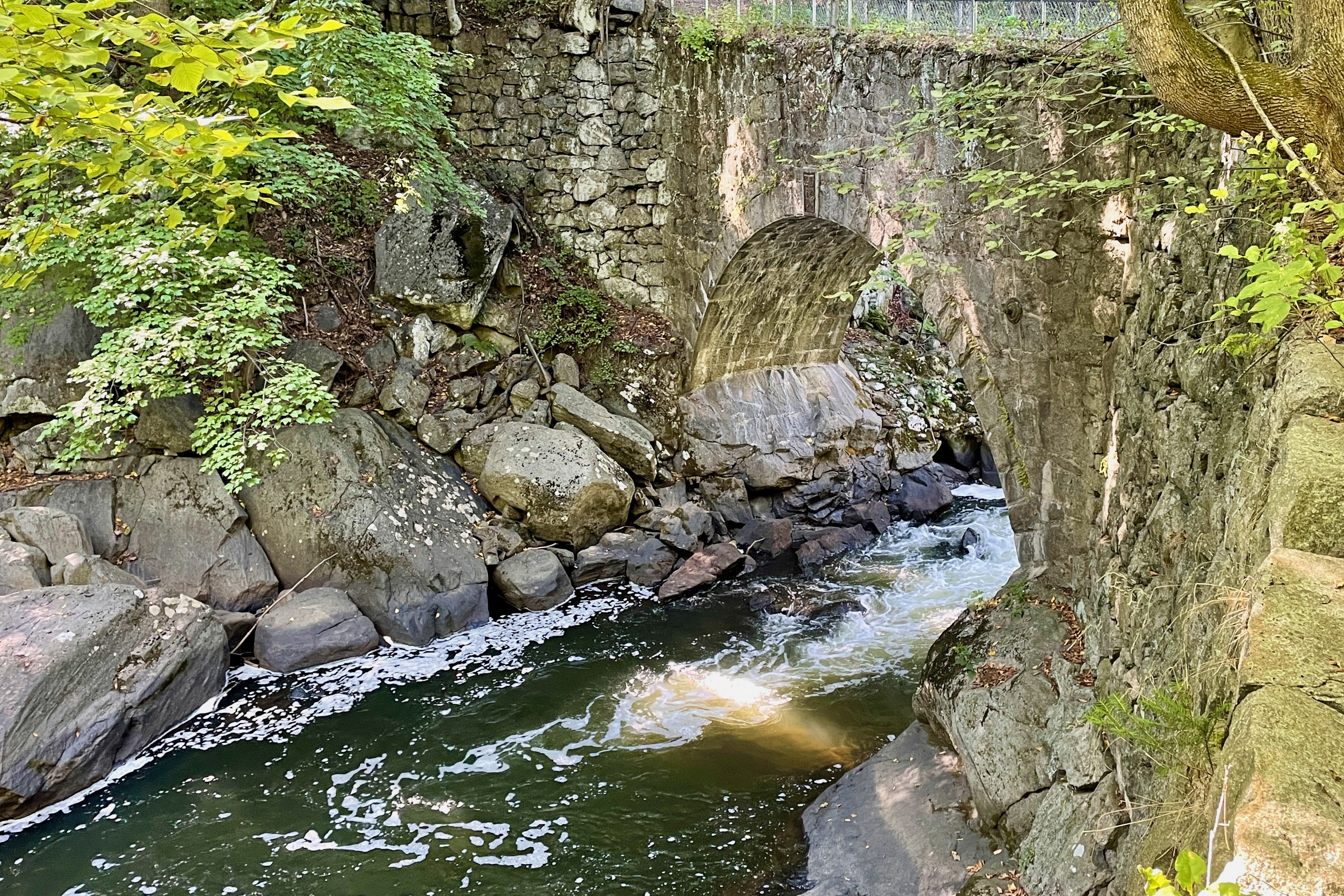

- Location within Morris County, New Jersey Location within New Jersey Location within the United States
- Location: Grace Lord Park; Boonton, New Jersey
- Coordinates: 40°54′23.4″N 74°24′57.6″W
- Built: 1866
- Built by: John Carson Sr.
- Part of: Boonton Ironworks Historic District (ID100009115)
- NRHP reference No.: 100008042
- NJRHP No.: 5620

Significant dates
- Added to NRHP: September 1, 2022
- Designated CP: July 14, 2023
- Designated NJRHP: July 8, 2022

The Arch Bridge from the Boonton Ironworks crosses the Rockaway River in Grace Lord Park in the town of Boonton in Morris County, New Jersey. The single-span fieldstone arch bridge was built by John Carson Sr. in 1866 to carry a water pipe to the ironworks. It was added to the National Register of Historic Places on September 1, 2022, for its significance in engineering. It is currently used as a pedestrian bridge.

== History and description ==
In 1866, Fuller & Lord, operators of the ironworks, hired local mason John Carson Sr. to construct a fieldstone arch bridge to carry a water pipe across the Rockaway River in the Boonton Gorge. The pipe would provide a reliable source of water for fire protection at the ironworks. Water from the Morris Canal was not always available. The bridge width is 9 feet (2.7 m) and the length is 47 feet (14 m).

In 2020, the New Jersey Historic Trust funded the stabilization and restoration of the bridge, located in the New Jersey Register of Historic Places state-designated Boonton Ironworks Historic District. In 2023, it was listed as a key contributing structure of the Boonton Ironworks Historic District.

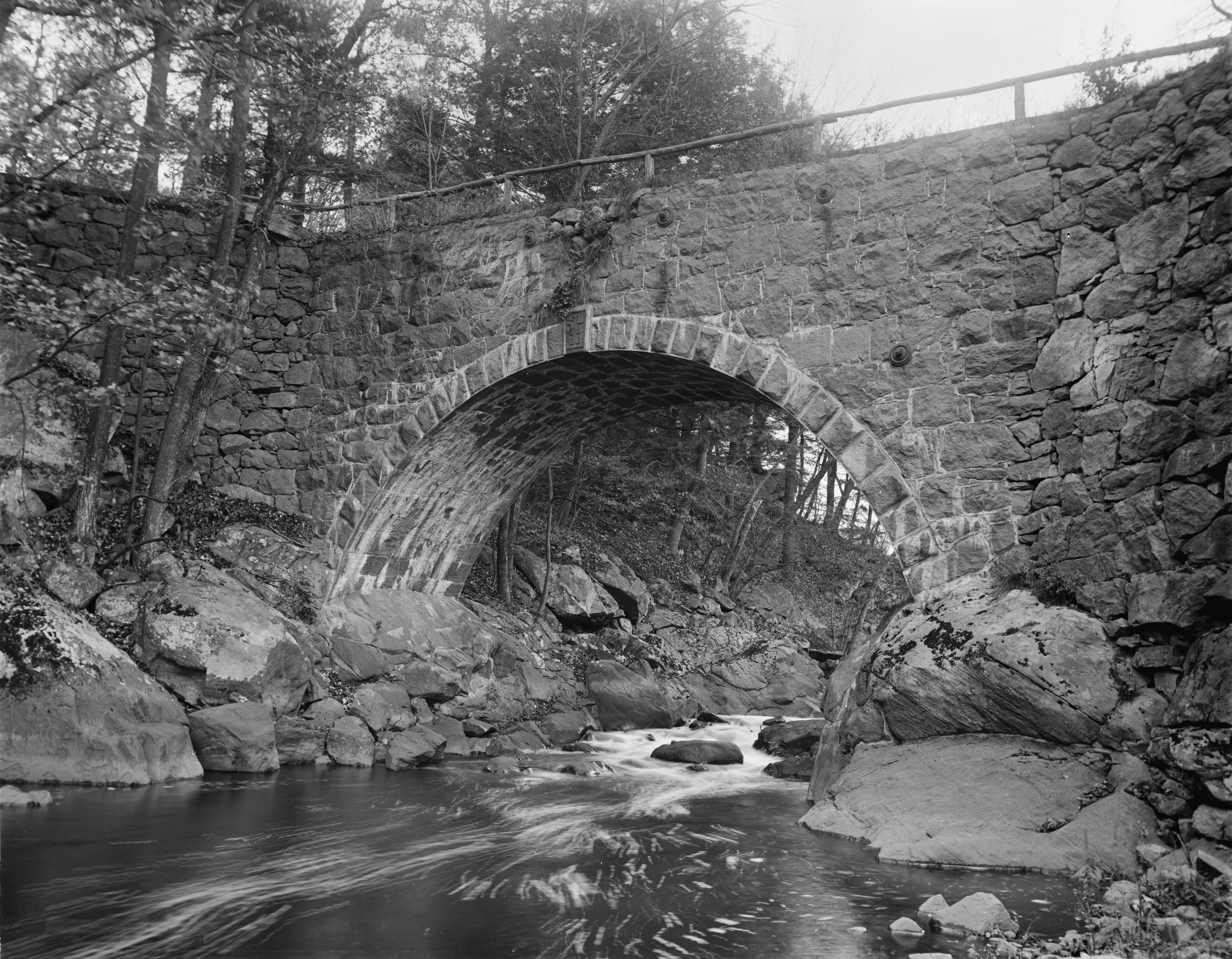
The Old Stone Bridge,
photo taken between 1890 and 1901

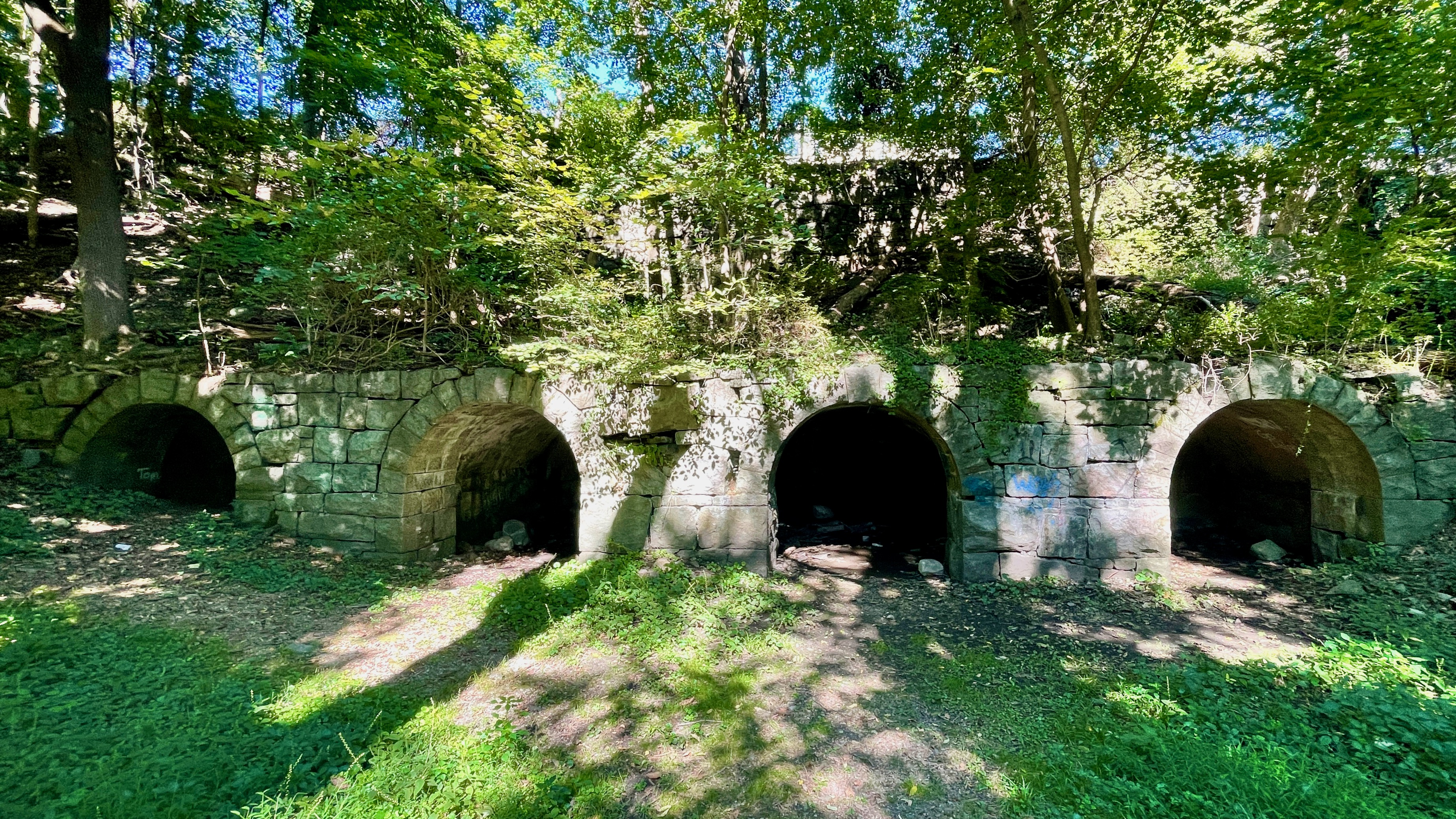
Remains of stone foundation with arches at the ironworks

== See also ==
- National Register of Historic Places listings in Morris County, New Jersey
- List of bridges on the National Register of Historic Places in New Jersey
