= Greenwood Cemetery, Boonton =

Coordinates: 40.896°N 74.409°W

Greenwood Cemetery is a cemetery in Boonton, in the U.S. state of New Jersey.

== Notable interments ==
- John H. Capstick (1856–1918), represented New Jersey's 5th congressional district from 1918 to 1919.
- Charles Ferren Hopkins (1842–1934), Medal of Honor recipient while fighting for the 1st New Jersey Volunteer Infantry during the American Civil War.
- Joshua S. Salmon (1846–1902), represented New Jersey's 4th congressional district from 1902 to 1903.
- Arthur Stringer (1874–1950), writer and poet
