= Joshua S. Salmon =

American politician (1846-1902)

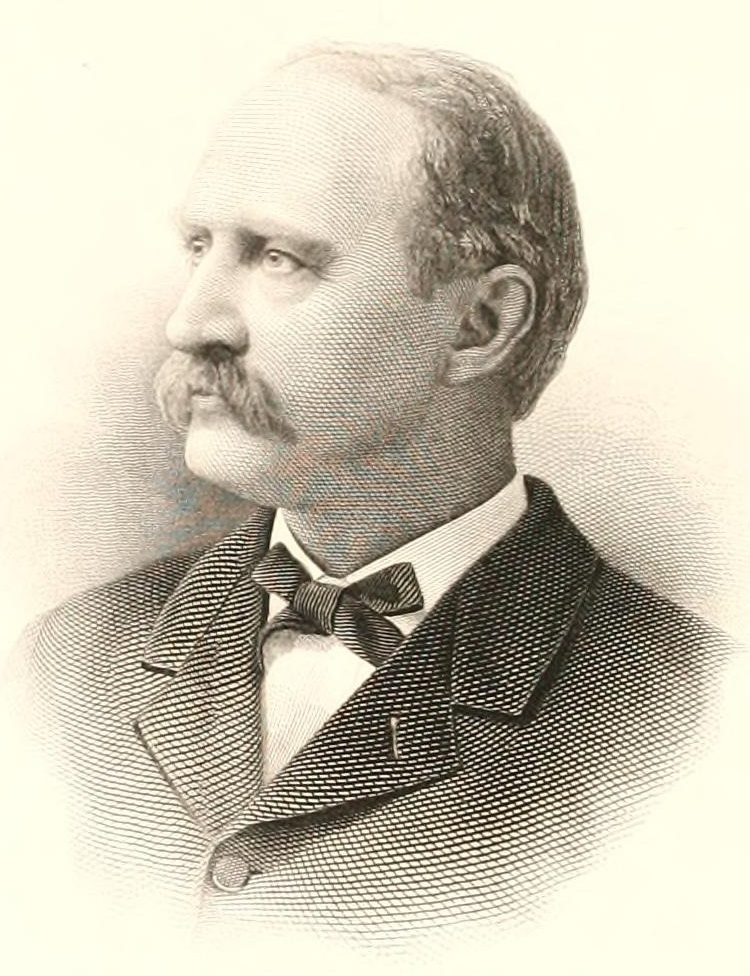
- Frontispiece of 1903's Joshua S. Salmon, Late a Representative.

Member of the U.S. House of Representatives from New Jersey's 4th district
- In office March 4, 1899 – May 6, 1902
- Preceded by: Mahlon Pitney
- Succeeded by: De Witt C. Flanagan

Member of the New Jersey General Assembly
- In office 1877-1878

Personal details
- Born: February 2, 1846 Mount Olive Township, New Jersey, USA
- Died: May 6, 1902 (aged 56) Boonton, New Jersey, USA
- Party: Democratic
- Profession: politician

Joshua S. Salmon (February 2, 1846 – May 6, 1902) was an American Democratic Party politician who represented New Jersey's 4th congressional district from 1899 to 1902.

== Biography ==
Salmon was born in Mount Olive Township, New Jersey on February 2, 1846, and at an early age moved with his parents to the community of Bartley in Mount Olive. He attended the district school and taught school for two years. He completed an academic course at the Charlotteville Seminary (in Summit, New York) and at Schooley's Mountain Seminary (in Schooley's Mountain, New Jersey), where he afterward became an instructor. He graduated from the Albany Law School in 1873, was admitted to the New York bar in 1873, to the New Jersey bar in 1875, and commenced practice in Jersey City, New Jersey. He moved to Boonton, and practiced there and in Morristown, New Jersey. He held several county offices in Morris County. He was a member of the New Jersey General Assembly in 1877 and 1878, and was prosecuting attorney of Morris County from 1893 to 1898. He was a delegate to the 1900 Democratic National Convention.

Salmon was elected as a Democrat to the Fifty-sixth and Fifty-seventh Congresses and served in office from March 4, 1899, until his death in Boonton on May 6, 1902. He was interred in Boonton's Greenwood Cemetery.

== See also ==
- List of members of the United States Congress who died in office (1900–1949)

== Notes ==
U.S. House of Representatives
Preceded by Mahlon Pitney	Member of the U.S. House of Representatives from New Jersey's 4th congressional district March 4, 1899–May 6, 1902	Succeeded by De Witt C. Flanagan
