= Boonton Iron Works =

- Boonton Ironworks Historic District
- U.S. National Register of Historic Places
- U.S. Historic district
- New Jersey Register of Historic Places
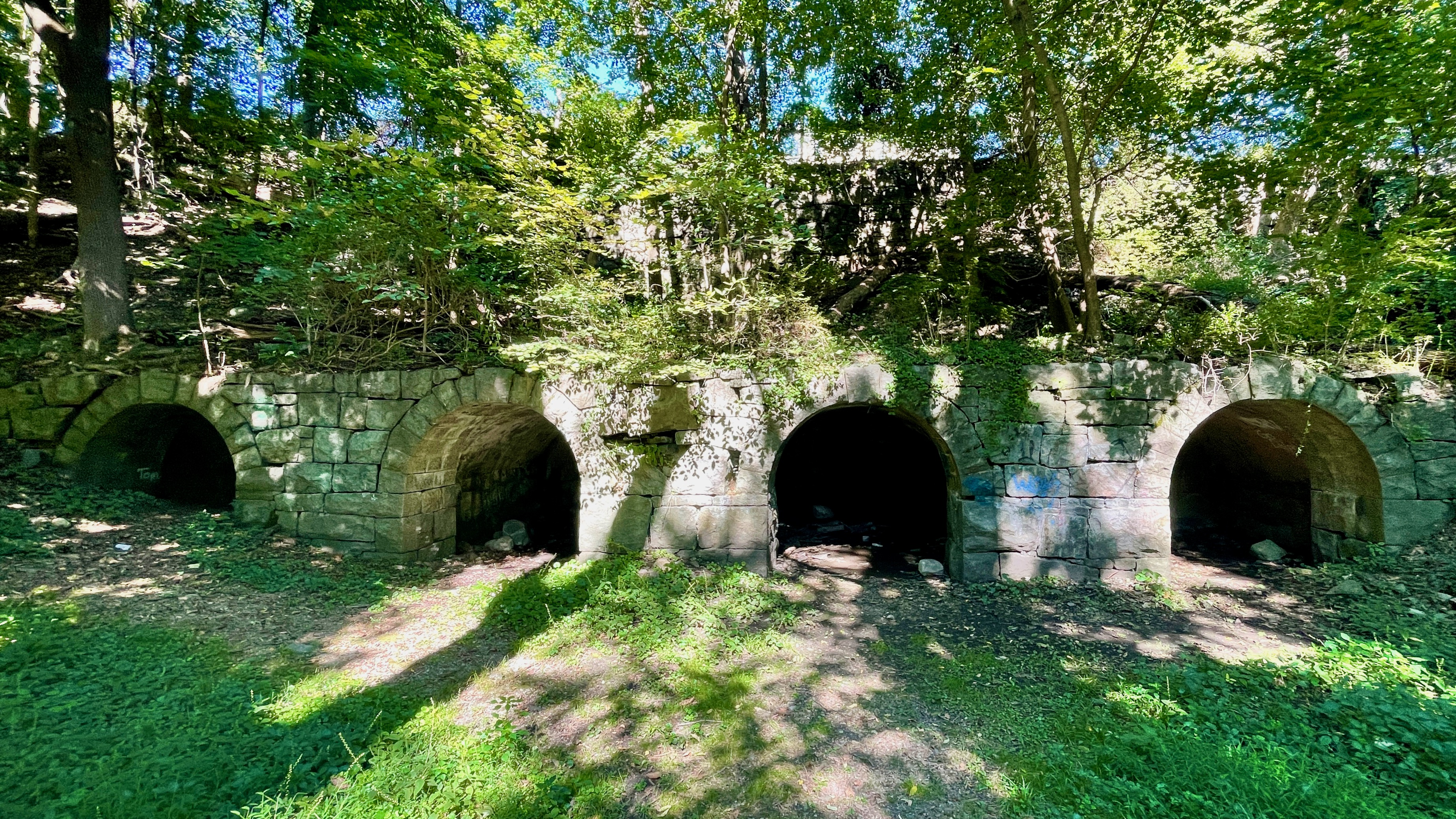
- Remains of stone foundation with arches at the Boonton Ironworks

- Location within Morris County, New Jersey Location within New Jersey Location within the United States
- Location: Plane Street, Grace Lord Park; Boonton, New Jersey
- Coordinates: 40°54′18″N 74°24′48″W
- Area: 53 acres (21 ha)
- NRHP reference No.: 100009115
- NJRHP No.: 5723

Significant dates
- Added to NRHP: July 14, 2023
- Designated NJRHP: March 21, 2023

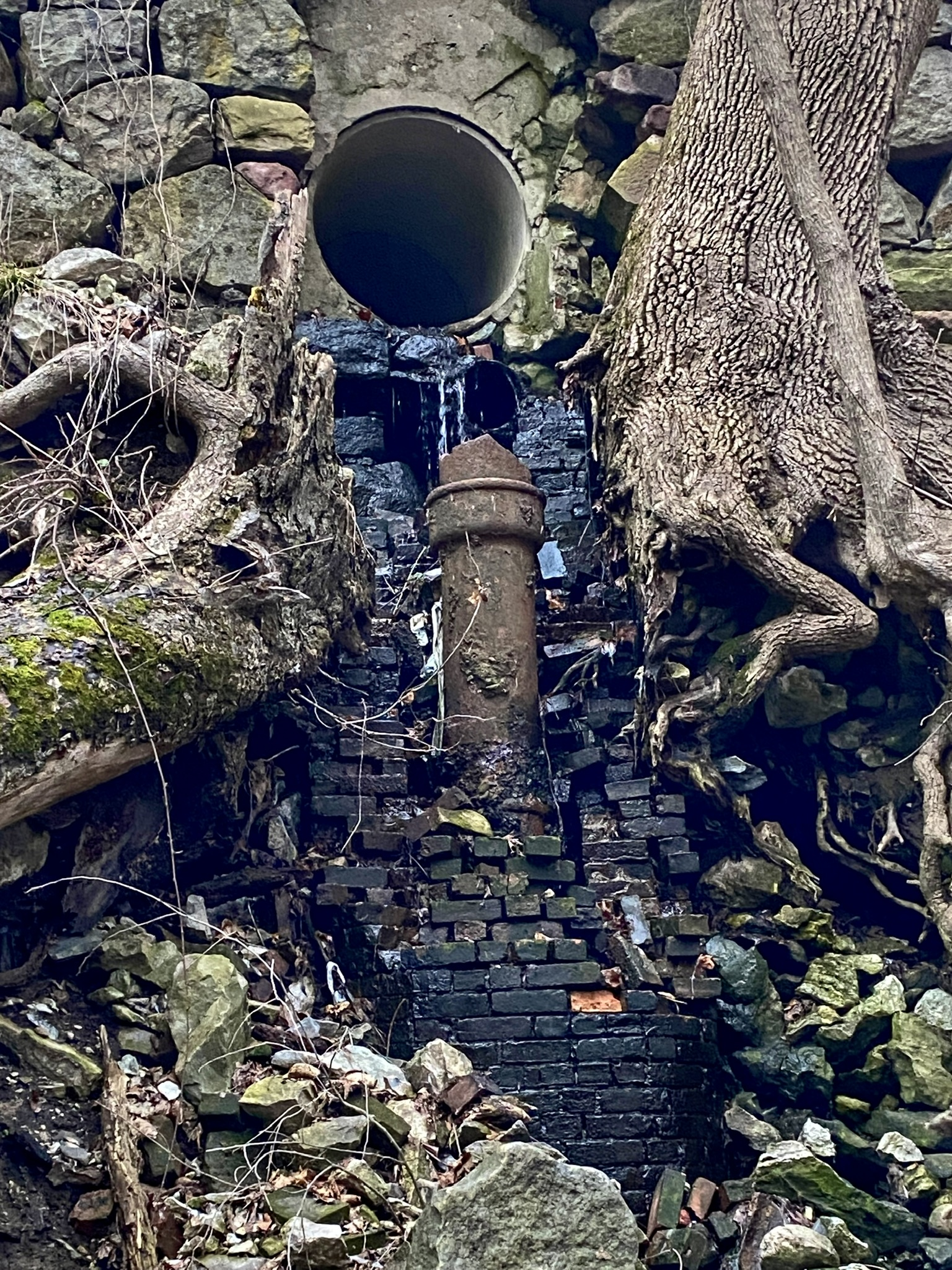
Drainage pipe surrounded by original bricks

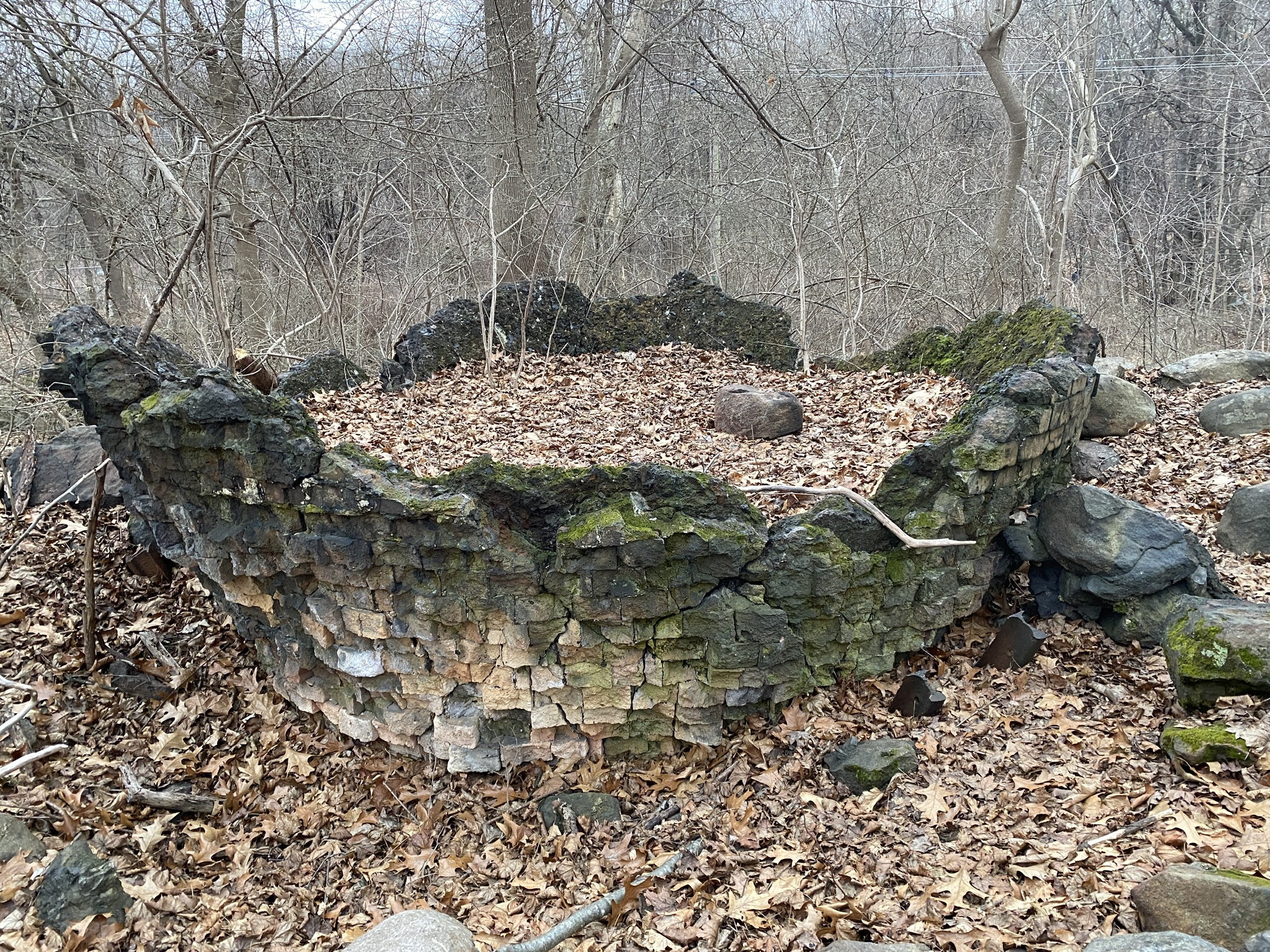
Blast furnace base remains

The Boonton Iron Works were founded about 1770 by Samuel Ogden who, with others in his family, purchased a 6-acre (24,000 m^{2}) tract along the Rockaway River, near present-day Boonton, New Jersey. Here rolling and slitting mills were erected that engaged in the manufacture of nail rods and bar iron. With the construction of the Morris Canal in 1830, the New Jersey Iron Company was organized. This company built a new plant costing $283,000 (equivalent to $8.6 million in 2025) and imported skilled mechanics from England. Under Fuller & Lord (1852–1876) the enterprise became an integrated industry with ore and timber reserves, canal boats, furnaces, mills and auxiliary plants. After 1881, the business slowly declined. The plant closed in 1911.

== Historic district ==
The property was listed as the Boonton Ironworks Historic District on the National Register of Historic Places on July 14, 2023, for its significance in engineering, industry, and transportation. The 53-acre (21 ha) historic district located in Grace Lord Park in the town of Boonton includes 13 contributing sites and 2 contributing structures. It includes the Arch Bridge from the Boonton Ironworks and sections of the Morris Canal, previously listed on the NRHP.

== See also ==
- National Register of Historic Places listings in Morris County, New Jersey
- David Thomas (industrialist)

== Sources ==
- James Truslow Adams, Dictionary of American History (New York: Charles Scribner's Sons, 1940).
