= De Witt C. Flanagan =

American politician (1870–1946)

De Witt Clinton Flanagan
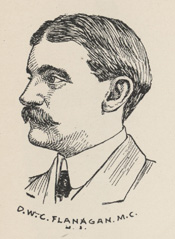

Member of the U.S. House of Representatives from New Jersey's 4th district
- In office June 18, 1902 – March 3, 1903
- Preceded by: Joshua S. Salmon
- Succeeded by: William M. Lanning

Personal details
- Born: December 28, 1870 New York City, U.S.
- Died: January 15, 1946 (aged 75) Utica, New York, U.S.
- Party: Democratic
- Profession: Politician

De Witt Clinton Flanagan (December 28, 1870 – January 15, 1946) was an American businessman and Democratic Party politician from New Jersey who briefly represented the 4th congressional district from 1902 to 1903.

== Early life and career ==
Flanagan was born in New York City on December 28, 1870. He attended the Callison and Woodbridge private schools and Columbia College.

He pursued a commercial career, with interests in a number of industrial enterprises.

== Congress ==
He was elected as a Democrat to the Fifty-seventh Congress to fill the vacancy caused by the death of Joshua S. Salmon, and served in office from June 18, 1902, to March 3, 1903.

== Later career and death ==
After leaving Congress, he was a delegate to the 1904 Democratic National Convention.

Together with August Belmont, he was one of the organizers of the Boston, Cape Cod & New York Canal Co., which built and operated the Cape Cod Canal. He engaged in the agricultural and civic development of Baldwin County, Alabama.

He died in Utica, New York on January 15, 1946, and was interred in the family mausoleum in Woodlawn Cemetery, Bronx, New York.

== Notes ==
U.S. House of Representatives
Preceded by Joshua S. Salmon	Member of the U.S. House of Representatives from New Jersey's 4th congressional district June 18, 1902–March 3, 1903	Succeeded by William M. Lanning
