= Boonton, New Jersey =

Town in Morris County, New Jersey, US

- Town
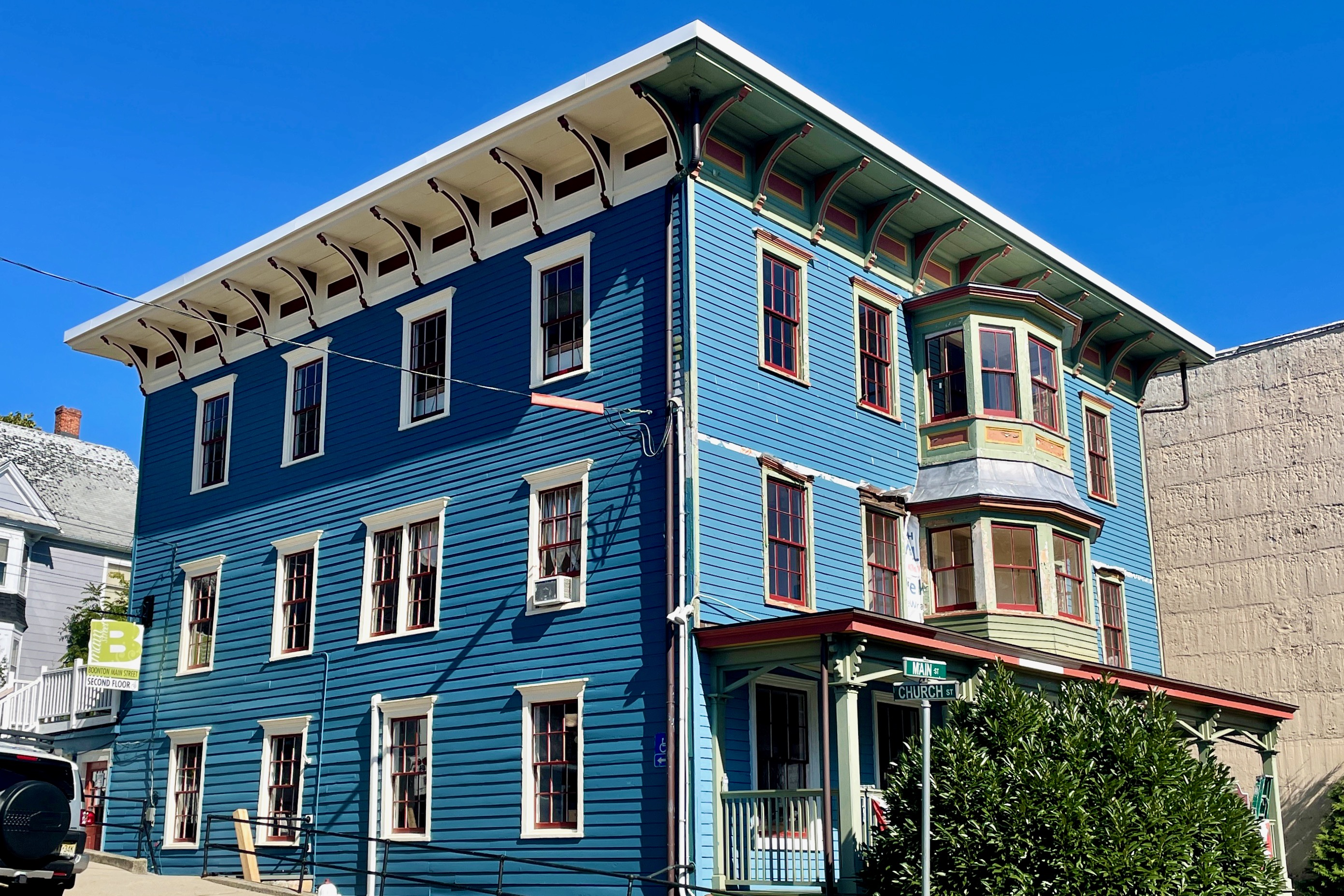
- Boonton Public Library, listed on the NRHP

- logo
- Motto: A Great Place to Live and Work
- Location of Boonton in Morris County highlighted in red (right). Inset map: Location of Morris County in New Jersey highlighted in orange (left).

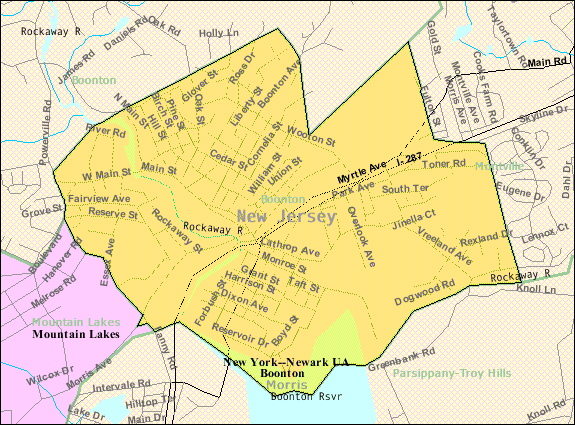
- Census Bureau map of Boonton, New Jersey

- Location in Morris County Location in New Jersey Location in the United States
- Coordinates: 40.903818°N 74.406369°W
- Country: United States
- State: New Jersey
- County: Morris
- Formed: March 16, 1866
- Reincorporated: March 18, 1867
- Named for: Thomas Boone

Government
  - Type: Town
  - Body: Town Council
  - Mayor: James Lynch (R, term ends December 31, 2027)
  - Administrator: Neil Henry
  - Municipal clerk: Elizabeth Bonsiewich

Area
  - Total: 2.49 sq mi (6.44 km^{2})
  - Land: 2.34 sq mi (6.07 km^{2})
  - Water: 0.15 sq mi (0.38 km^{2}) 6.39%
  - Rank: 374th of 565 in state 31st of 39 in county
- Elevation: 397 ft (121 m)

Population (2020)
  - Total: 8,815
  - Estimate (2024): 8,894
  - Rank: 269th of 565 in state 22nd of 39 in county
  - Density: 3,775.2/sq mi (1,457.6/km^{2})
  - Rank: 174th of 565 in state 8th of 39 in county
- Time zone: UTC−05:00 (Eastern (EST))
  - Summer (DST): UTC−04:00 (Eastern (EDT))
- ZIP Code: 07005
- Area code: 973
- FIPS code: 3402706610
- GNIS feature ID: 0885164
- Website: www.boonton.org

Boonton (/ˈbutən/) is a town in Morris County, in the U.S. state of New Jersey. As of the 2020 United States census, the town's population was 8,815, an increase of 468 (+5.6%) from the 2010 census count of 8,347, which in turn reflected a decline of 149 (−1.8%) from the 8,496 counted in the 2000 census. The settlement was originally called "Boone-Towne" in 1761 in honor of the Colonial Governor Thomas Boone.

Boonton was originally formed on March 16, 1866, within portions of Hanover Township and Pequannock Township. The town was reincorporated and became fully independent on March 18, 1867.

The development of Boonton began in about 1829, as a result of the construction of the Morris Canal and the formation of the New Jersey Iron Company. The original location of the town is now largely under the Jersey City Reservoir, completed in 1904. In 1908, the waters from this reservoir were the first municipal water supply in the United States to be chlorinated. The decision to build the chlorination system was made by John L. Leal and the facility was designed by George W. Fuller.

== History ==
During the 18th century, the settlement of Boonetown Falls (variously spelled as Booneton or the current Boonton) was established on the Rockaway River, about 1.5 miles (2.4 km) downstream from the current site of the town. As early as 1747, Obadiah Baldwin ran an iron refining forge there. He used the iron ore and charcoal available in the area together with water power from the river. As the ironworks grew, workers and their families formed a community in 1761 that was named "Boone-Towne" in honor of the Colonial Governor, Thomas Boone.

The present town developed separately from the settlement of Booneton Falls. The population moved away after 1830, when a canal was completed that drew off business and traffic. The site of Old Boonton downriver has been covered since 1903 by the Jersey City reservoir formed on the dammed river.

=== Ironworks ===
The Boonton Iron Works were founded about 1770 by Samuel Ogden of Newark, New Jersey. Together with brothers, he purchased a 6-acre (24,000 m^{2}) tract along the Rockaway River. Throughout the American Revolutionary War, the Booneton Iron Works was busily engaged in supplying numerous miscellaneous iron products for the military. After the war, operations at Boonton were continued under John Jacob Faesch and his two sons, and, later, by William Scott. He tried to revive the declining business. In 1824, Scott's interest in rejuvenating the antiquated ironworks faded when he learned that the Morris Canal was soon to be constructed, and that it would bypass the community of Booneton 1-mile (1.6 km) or more away.

But the proximity of the canal to Booneton Falls made that site ideal for a large factory. In 1830, a group of businessmen in New York City incorporated as the New Jersey Iron Company, with a capitalization of $283,000. Machinery and ironworkers were imported from England, and with the erection of the mills, a new community, called Booneton Falls, began to be developed on the rugged hillside overlooking the river.

The community Main Street is unique in that it is pitched against a cliff overlooking the 'Hollow' of the Rockaway River. This was said to follow an old Native American trail, developed from a deer path along the hillside.

The new Iron Company flourished for nearly 50 years. The settlement of Booneton Falls—like the older Booneton downstream—was essentially a one-industry town. After the Company closed down its operations in 1876, the town was on the verge of collapse. Although several attempts—one by Joseph Wharton—were made to re-establish iron works on a smaller scale, none endured for any great length of time. In the 21st century, only vestiges of foundations and structures remain in the "Hollow" between Plane Street and the river, to remind Boonton of its own Iron Age.

=== Other industries ===
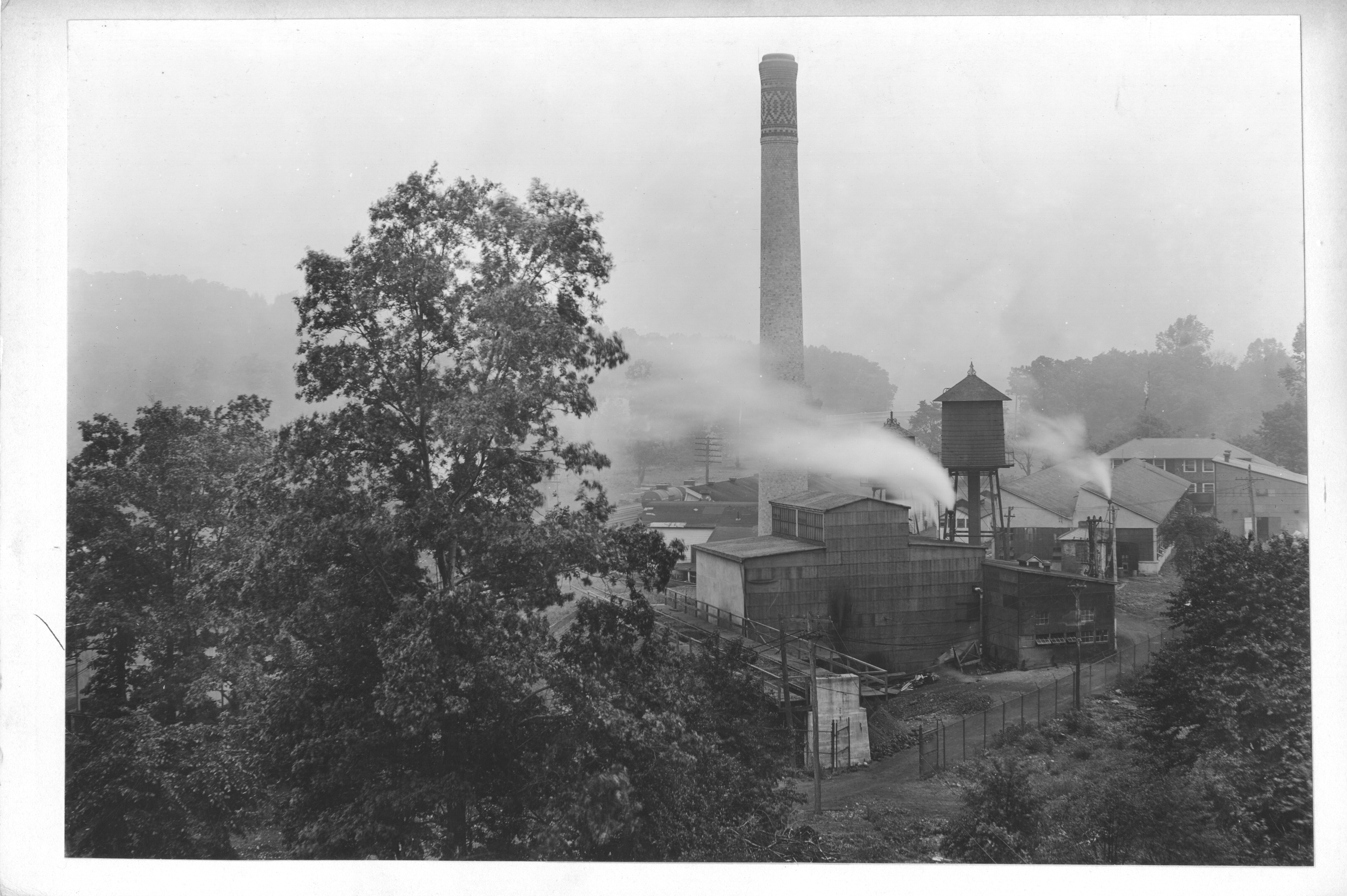
Boonton Rubber Mfg. Co., 1917

One of the first of the new industries secured for the town was a silk factory, which, as Pelgram & Meyer, and, later as Van Raalte, Inc., contributed materially to the town's prosperity. Others that followed were a knife factory, a paper mill (at the old settlement, by then called Old Boonton), a nail factory, a brass and iron foundry, and a carriage factory. The Morris Canal, although going into a rapid decline when superseded by railroads, still employed a number of men. The Lackawanna Railroad completed its Boonton Branch in 1870, giving employment to a number of Boonton people and providing commuter service to Boonton residents who worked in New York City. The town supported many individually owned businesses, such as blacksmith shops, machine shops, bakeries and a miscellany of stores, which began to prosper anew as the nation emerged from the depression of the 1870s.

In 1891, the Loanda Hard Rubber Company was founded by Edwin A. Scribner, and began the manufacture of molded hard rubber products. After Scribner died, the management of the firm fell to his son-in-law Richard W. Seabury. In 1906, Seabury learned of experiments with synthetic resins made by Leo Baekeland, for whom Bakelite was later to be named. Originally intended by Baekeland for a synthetic varnish, the new material was used by Seabury in making the world's first molding of organic plastics in 1907. Boontonware, a molded plastic dinnerware, was sold nationwide.

George Scribner, son of Loanda founder Edwin Scribner, opted to continue the business of plastics molding and established Boonton Molding. The company produced the line of Boontonware dinnerware, molded plastic plates, bowls, and cups manufactured in the 1950s and 1960s. The company also operated a factory outlet store in Boonton for many years. George Scribner was eventually inducted into the Plastics Hall of Fame as a pioneer in developing molding techniques and applications at Boonton Molding Co. from 1920. He is considered a preeminent contributor to the development of the industry through his services as president and board chairman of the SPI during the period 1943–1947.

The molded plastics industry attracted the radio and electronics industries to the Boonton area. In the 1920s, the burgeoning radio industry created a large demand for molded parts. Richard W. Seabury organized Radio Frequency Laboratories to exploit that new field. More than a half dozen radio and electronics firms were later formed as spin-offs, and recognized internationally for the excellence of their products. Radio engineers had respect for the Boonton Radio Co., located in nearby Rockaway, which manufactured a high-quality test instrument known as a Q meter, still used by hobbyists today. Most of those companies have been bought up and are now divisions of larger corporations and have relocated elsewhere, having undergone name changes in many cases. The Boonton Radio Co., for instance, was purchased by Hewlett-Packard. RFL Industries, Aircraft Radio Corporation, Measurements Corporation, and Ballantine Laboratories are among those that contributed materially to the prosperity of the area.

In 1917, E.A. Stevenson & Company established the "Butter Works" on the site of the old Knox Hat factory. Stevenson started processing coconut and other vegetable oils and making margarine. Under later operation by E.F. Drew & Company, the Boonton plant grew to be one of the largest edible oils processors in the country. It was the largest industry in the town of Boonton during the 20th century. The plant closed in the early 1990s, and the site was developed for a Walmart store.

In recent years, Boonton has attracted several art galleries. Most of the galleries are located on the 800 block of Main Street, with a total of six galleries in the area surrounding Boonton Avenue and Main Street. This is often referred to as the Boonton Art District. The galleries hold an art walk showcasing gallery openings on the first Friday of each month.

== Geography ==
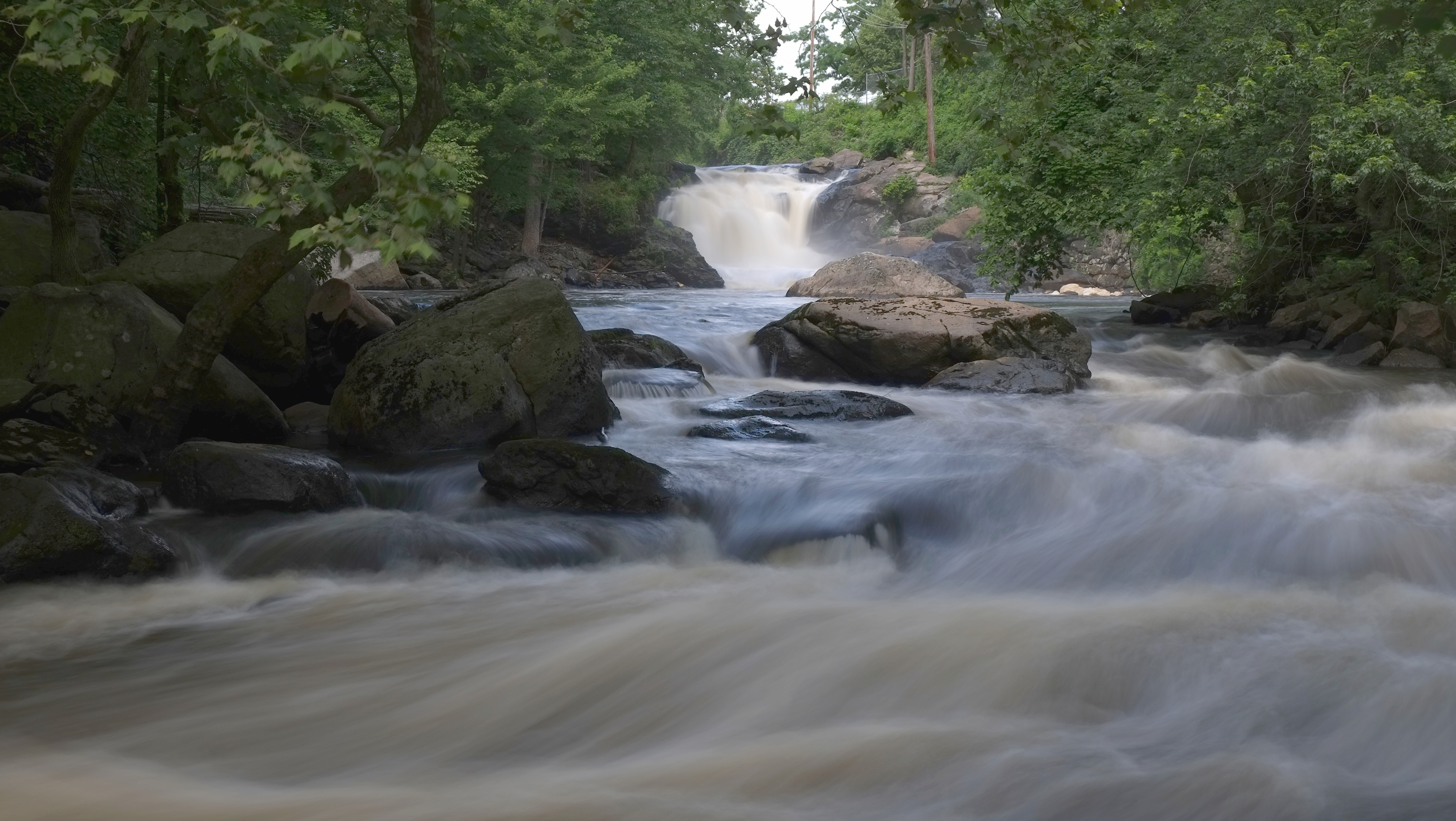
Rockaway River waterfall and rapids in the Boonton Gorge

According to the United States Census Bureau, the town had a total area of 2.49 square miles (6.46 km^{2}), including 2.34 square miles (6.05 km^{2}) of land and 0.16 square miles (0.41 km^{2}) of water (6.39%).

The Rockaway River flows through Boonton Gorge downtown, featuring whitewater rapids including a waterfall that is 25 feet (7.6 m) high.

The borough borders the Morris County municipalities of Boonton Township, Montville, Mountain Lakes and Parsippany-Troy Hills.

=== Climate ===
Climate data for Boonton 1 SE, New Jersey (1991–2020 normals, extremes 1893–present)
Month	Jan	Feb	Mar	Apr	May	Jun	Jul	Aug	Sep	Oct	Nov	Dec	Year
Record high °F (°C)	71 (22)	75 (24)	83 (28)	93 (34)	98 (37)	99 (37)	102 (39)	103 (39)	104 (40)	90 (32)	80 (27)	77 (25)	104 (40)
Mean daily maximum °F (°C)	37.6 (3.1)	40.0 (4.4)	48.4 (9.1)	61.1 (16.2)	71.0 (21.7)	80.7 (27.1)	85.4 (29.7)	83.6 (28.7)	76.5 (24.7)	64.1 (17.8)	52.6 (11.4)	42.4 (5.8)	62.0 (16.7)
Daily mean °F (°C)	29.1 (−1.6)	30.9 (−0.6)	38.5 (3.6)	50.1 (10.1)	60.1 (15.6)	69.7 (20.9)	74.7 (23.7)	72.8 (22.7)	65.5 (18.6)	53.2 (11.8)	42.8 (6.0)	34.3 (1.3)	51.8 (11.0)
Mean daily minimum °F (°C)	20.6 (−6.3)	21.8 (−5.7)	28.7 (−1.8)	39.1 (3.9)	49.3 (9.6)	58.8 (14.9)	64.0 (17.8)	62.1 (16.7)	54.4 (12.4)	42.4 (5.8)	33.1 (0.6)	26.2 (−3.2)	41.7 (5.4)
Record low °F (°C)	−15 (−26)	−20 (−29)	−3 (−19)	8 (−13)	26 (−3)	32 (0)	42 (6)	36 (2)	29 (−2)	16 (−9)	6 (−14)	−21 (−29)	−21 (−29)
Average precipitation inches (mm)	3.73 (95)	2.79 (71)	4.16 (106)	3.63 (92)	3.95 (100)	4.91 (125)	4.70 (119)	3.67 (93)	4.68 (119)	4.54 (115)	4.06 (103)	4.36 (111)	49.18 (1,249)
Average precipitation days (≥ 0.01 in)	10.5	10.0	11.0	12.2	13.4	12.1	10.9	10.2	9.2	11.2	8.1	12.1	130.9
Source: NOAA

== Demographics ==
Historical population
Census	Pop.	Note	%±
1870	3,458		—
1880	2,277		−34.2%
1890	2,981		30.9%
1900	3,901		30.9%
1910	4,930		26.4%
1920	5,372		9.0%
1930	6,866		27.8%
1940	6,739		−1.8%
1950	7,163		6.3%
1960	7,981		11.4%
1970	9,261		16.0%
1980	8,620		−6.9%
1990	8,343		−3.2%
2000	8,496		1.8%
2010	8,347		−1.8%
2020	8,815		5.6%
2024 (est.)	8,894	▲	0.9%
Population sources: 1870–1920; 1870 1880–1890; 1890–1910 1910–1930; 1940–2000 2000; 2010 2020

=== 2020 census ===
As of the 2020 census, Boonton had a population of 8,815. The median age was 40.2 years. 20.1% of residents were under the age of 18 and 14.9% of residents were 65 years of age or older. For every 100 females there were 100.3 males, and for every 100 females age 18 and over there were 99.3 males age 18 and over.

100.0% of residents lived in urban areas, while 0.0% lived in rural areas.

There were 3,412 households in Boonton, of which 29.8% had children under the age of 18 living in them. Of all households, 47.2% were married-couple households, 18.7% were households with a male householder and no spouse or partner present, and 26.1% were households with a female householder and no spouse or partner present. About 25.4% of all households were made up of individuals and 8.9% had someone living alone who was 65 years of age or older.

There were 3,555 housing units, of which 4.0% were vacant. The homeowner vacancy rate was 1.6% and the rental vacancy rate was 3.7%.

Racial composition as of the 2020 census
Race	Number	Percent
White	5,865	66.5%
Black or African American	463	5.3%
American Indian and Alaska Native	23	0.3%
Asian	967	11.0%
Native Hawaiian and Other Pacific Islander	1	0.0%
Some other race	594	6.7%
Two or more races	902	10.2%
Hispanic or Latino (of any race)	1,409	16.0%

=== 2010 census ===
The 2010 United States census counted 8,347 people, 3,235 households, and 2,112 families in the town. The population density was 3,574.6 per square mile (1,380.2/km^{2}). There were 3,398 housing units at an average density of 1,455.2 per square mile (561.9/km^{2}). The racial makeup was 78.81% (6,578) White, 4.82% (402) Black or African American, 0.31% (26) Native American, 10.05% (839) Asian, 0.01% (1) Pacific Islander, 2.79% (233) from other races, and 3.21% (268) from two or more races. Hispanic or Latino of any race were 11.02% (920) of the population.

Of the 3,235 households, 29.0% had children under the age of 18; 48.6% were married couples living together; 11.8% had a female householder with no husband present and 34.7% were non-families. Of all households, 26.2% were made up of individuals and 8.7% had someone living alone who was 65 years of age or older. The average household size was 2.54 and the average family size was 3.10.

21.2% of the population were under the age of 18, 7.1% from 18 to 24, 30.6% from 25 to 44, 27.9% from 45 to 64, and 13.2% who were 65 years of age or older. The median age was 39.4 years. For every 100 females, the population had 101.5 males. For every 100 females ages 18 and older there were 100.6 males.

The Census Bureau's 2006–2010 American Community Survey showed that (in 2010 inflation-adjusted dollars) median household income was $79,097 (with a margin of error of +/− $9,165) and the median family income was $89,965 (+/− $14,678). Males had a median income of $53,495 (+/− $4,466) versus $47,463 (+/− $7,099) for females. The per capita income for the borough was $33,366 (+/− $4,035). About 5.6% of families and 10.7% of the population were below the poverty line, including 17.8% of those under age 18 and 4.7% of those age 65 or over.

=== 2000 census ===
As of the 2000 United States census there were 8,496 people, 3,272 households, and 2,159 families residing in the town. The population density was 3,619.5 inhabitants per square mile (1,397.5/km^{2}). There were 3,352 housing units at an average density of 1,428.1 per square mile (551.4/km^{2}). The racial makeup of the town was 83.00% White, 4.00% African American, 0.21% Native American, 7.8% Asian, 0.01% Pacific Islander, 2.20% from other races, and 2.84% from two or more races. Hispanic or Latino of any race were 6.9% of the population.

Boonton had the highest percentage of Pakistani ancestry people at 3.53%, of any place in the United States with 1,000 or more residents listing their ancestry. As of the 2000 Census, 1.3% of residents identified themselves as being of Turkish American ancestry, the fifth-highest of any municipality in the United States and third-highest in the state.

There were 3,272 households, out of which 28.5% had children under the age of 18 living with them, 51.6% were married couples living together, 11.0% had a female householder with no husband present, and 34.0% were non-families. 26.3% of all households were made up of individuals, and 9.5% had someone living alone who was 65 years of age or older. The average household size was 2.55 and the average family size was 3.11.

In the town, the population was spread out, with 21.9% under the age of 18, 6.8% from 18 to 24, 35.4% from 25 to 44, 22.4% from 45 to 64, and 13.5% who were 65 years of age or older. The median age was 37 years. For every 100 females, there were 98.4 males. For every 100 females age 18 and over, there were 94.9 males.

The median income for a household in the town was $65,322, and the median income for a family was $75,147. Males had a median income of $60,518 versus $40,634 for females. The per capita income for the town was $29,919. About 6.7% of families and 5.0% of the population were below the poverty line, including 7.4% of those under age 18 and 6.6% of those age 65 or over.

== Sports ==
North Stars Gymnastics Academy is a gymnastics facility located in the city, which is home to various elites and Junior Olympic gymnasts.

== Parks and recreation ==
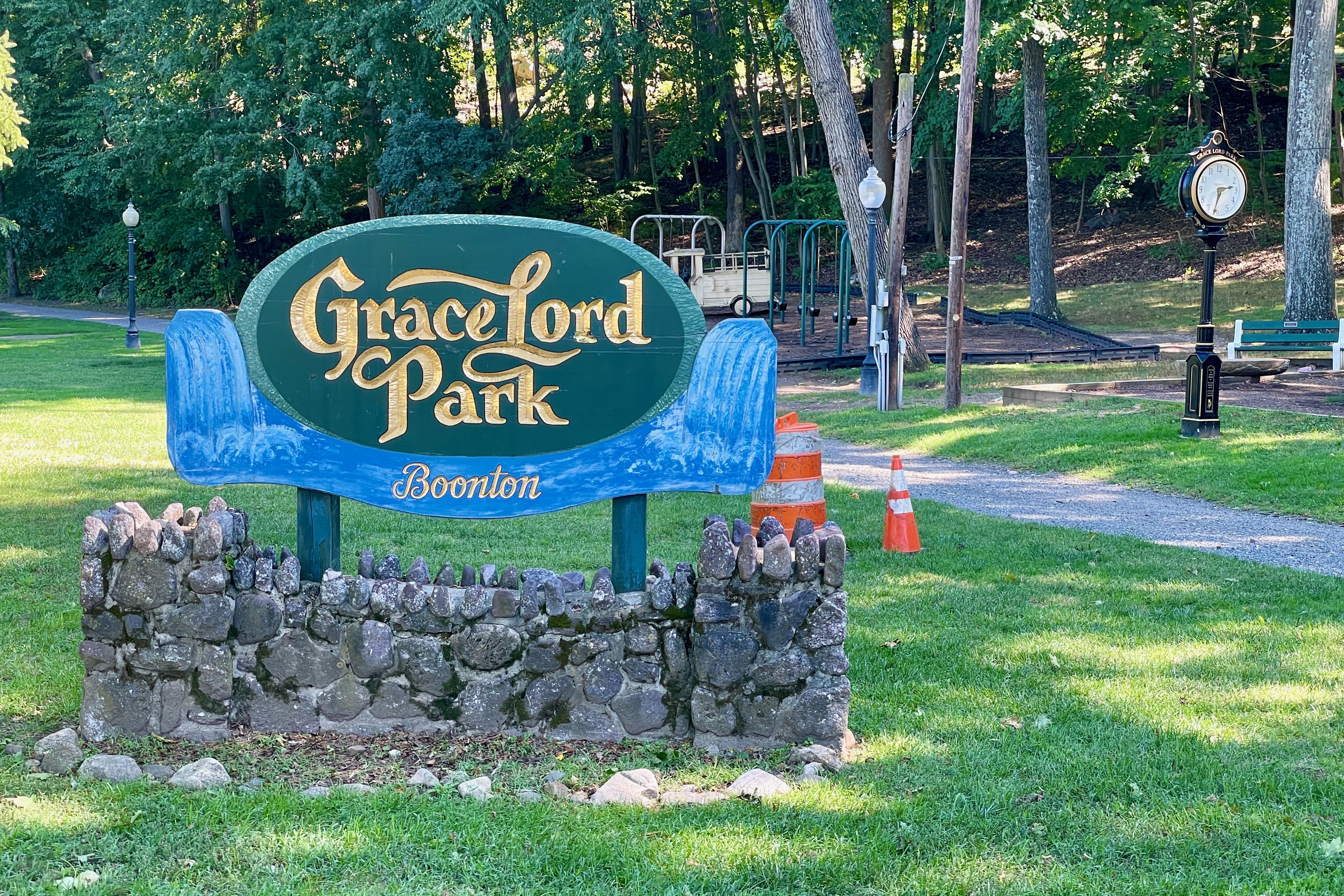
Entrance to Grace Lord Park

Grace Lord Park provides recreation opportunities and hiking trails, including a view of Boonton Falls.

== Government ==
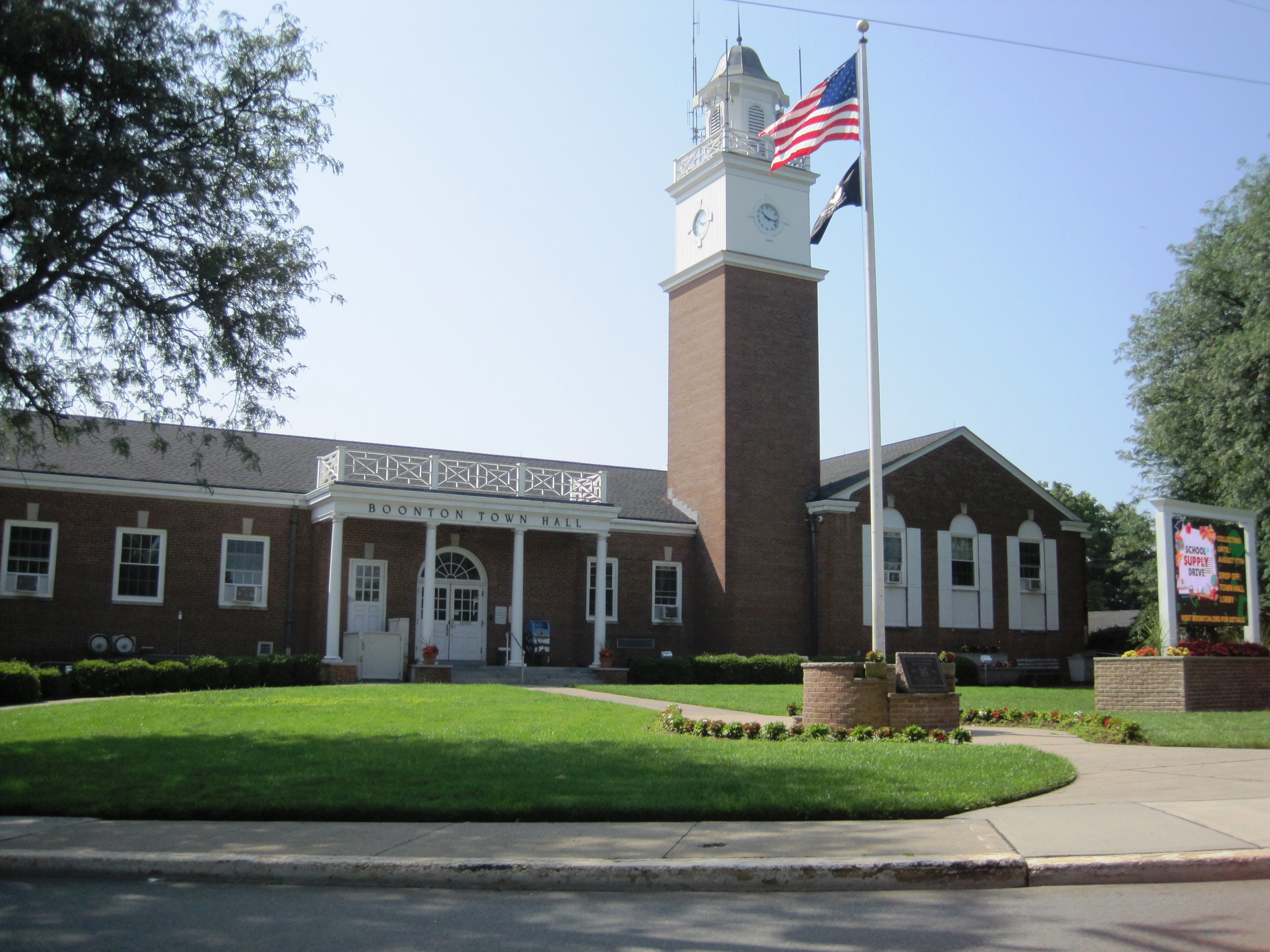
Boonton Town Hall

=== Local government ===
Boonton operates using the town form of government. The town is one of nine municipalities (of the 564) statewide that use this traditional form of government. The governing body is comprised of the Mayor and the Town Council. The governing body was previously called the Board of Aldermen, but in February 2021, the Board voted 7–2 to change the name to Town Council. The ordinance did not change the structure or function of municipal government. Members felt that the gendered “alderman” could dissuade women from running for office, and wanted to be more inclusive with the neutral “council member”. The mayor is elected at-large to a four-year term of office. The Town Council is comprised of eight members elected to serve two-year terms of office, with two Council Members elected from each of four wards on a staggered basis, with one seat from each of the four wards coming up for election each year.

As of 2026, the Mayor of Boonton is Republican James Lynch, whose term of office ends on December 31, 2027. Members of the Town Council are Council President Benjamin Weisman (Ward 4; D, 2026), Daniel Balan (Ward 3; R, 2026), Danielle Cascone (Ward 2; D, 2027), Marie DeVenezia (Ward 2; D, 2026), Luisa F. Lopez (Ward 4; D, 2027) Kimberly Mazzei (Ward 3; D, 2027) John P. Meehan (Ward 1; R, 2027) and Cy Wekilsky (Ward 1; R, 2026).

=== Federal, state and county representation ===
Boonton Town is located in the 11th Congressional District and is part of New Jersey's 26th state legislative district.

For the 119th United States Congress, New Jersey's 11th congressional district is represented by Analilia Mejia (D, Glen Ridge) who was elected in a 2026 special election to serve for the remainder of the Congress following the resignation Mikie Sherrill (D, Montclair), who was elected Governor of New Jersey in 2025. New Jersey is represented in the United States Senate by Democrats Cory Booker (Newark, term ends 2027) and Andy Kim (Moorestown, term ends 2031).

For the 2026–2027 session, the 26th legislative district of the New Jersey Legislature is represented in the State Senate by Joseph Pennacchio (R, Rockaway Township) and in the General Assembly by Brian Bergen (R, Denville Township) and Jay Webber (R, Morris Plains).

Morris County is governed by a Board of County Commissioners comprised of seven members who are elected at-large in partisan elections to three-year terms on a staggered basis, with either one or three seats up for election each year as part of the November general election. Actual day-to-day operation of departments is supervised by County Administrator Deena Leary.

As of 2026, Morris County's Commissioners (with all terms ending December 31) are Director Stephen H. Shaw (R, Mountain Lakes, 2027), Deputy Director John Krickus (R, Washington Township, 2027), Douglas Cabana (R, Boonton Township, 2028), Thomas J. Mastrangelo (R, Montville, 2028), Christine Myers (R, Harding Township, 2028), Tayfun Selen (R, Chatham Township, 2026), and Deborah Smith (R, Denville Township, 2027).

The county's constitutional officers are County Clerk Ann F. Grossi (R, Parsippany–Troy Hills, 2028), Sheriff James M. Gannon (R, Boonton Township, 2025) and Surrogate Heather Darling (R, Roxbury, 2029).

=== Elections ===
United States presidential election results for Boonton Town 2024 2020 2016 2012 2008 2004
Year	Republican		Democratic		Third party(ies)	
Year	No.	%	No.	%	No.	%
2024	2,178	46.22%	2,334	49.53%	200	4.24%
2020	2,086	42.05%	2,788	56.20%	87	1.75%
2016	1,817	45.00%	2,042	50.57%	179	4.43%
2012	1,720	47.17%	1,882	51.62%	44	1.21%
2008	1,881	46.92%	2,087	52.06%	41	1.02%
2004	1,978	53.47%	1,677	45.34%	44	1.19%

As of March 23, 2011, there were a total of 5,037 registered voters in Boonton, of which 1,029 (20.4%) were registered as Democrats, 1,956 (38.8%) were registered as Republicans and 2,051 (40.7%) were registered as Unaffiliated. There was one voter registered to another party.

In the 2012 presidential election, Democrat Barack Obama received 51.6% of the vote (1,882 cast), ahead of Republican Mitt Romney with 47.2% (1,720 votes), and other candidates with 1.2% (44 votes), among the 3,669 ballots cast by the town's 5,310 registered voters (23 ballots were spoiled), for a turnout of 69.1%. In the 2008 presidential election, Democrat Barack Obama received 51.6% of the vote (2,087 cast), ahead of Republican John McCain with 46.5% (1,881 votes) and other candidates with 1.0% (41 votes), among the 4,045 ballots cast by the town's 5,262 registered voters, for a turnout of 76.9%. In the 2004 presidential election, Republican George W. Bush received 53.1% of the vote (1,978 ballots cast), outpolling Democrat John Kerry with 45.0% (1,677 votes) and other candidates with 0.9% (44 votes), among the 3,724 ballots cast by the town's 5,086 registered voters, for a turnout percentage of 73.2.

Gubernatorial election results for Boonton
Year	Republican		Democratic		Third party(ies)	
Year	No.	%	No.	%	No.	%
2025	1,641	43.29%	2,126	56.08%	24	0.63%
2021	1,543	50.92%	1,466	48.38%	21	0.69%
2017	1,206	49.49%	1,177	48.30%	54	2.22%
2013	1,527	67.15%	688	30.26%	59	2.59%
2009	1,372	56.28%	835	34.25%	231	9.47%
2005	1,205	53.99%	952	42.65%	75	3.36%

In the 2013 gubernatorial election, Republican Chris Christie received 67.2% of the vote (1,527 cast), ahead of Democrat Barbara Buono with 30.3% (688 votes), and other candidates with 2.6% (59 votes), among the 2,342 ballots cast by the town's 5,286 registered voters (68 ballots were spoiled), for a turnout of 44.3%. In the 2009 gubernatorial election, Republican Chris Christie received 55.5% of the vote (1,372 ballots cast), ahead of Democrat Jon Corzine with 33.8% (835 votes), Independent Chris Daggett with 9.0% (222 votes) and other candidates with 0.8% (19 votes), among the 2,474 ballots cast by the town's 5,161 registered voters, yielding a 47.9% turnout.

United States Senate election results for Boonton1
Year	Republican		Democratic		Third party(ies)	
Year	No.	%	No.	%	No.	%
2024	2,045	46.33%	2,185	49.50%	184	4.17%
2018	1,685	47.48%	1,698	47.84%	166	4.68%
2012	1,625	48.36%	1,675	49.85%	60	1.79%
2006	1,253	53.89%	1,019	43.83%	53	2.28%

United States Senate election results for Boonton2
Year	Republican		Democratic		Third party(ies)	
Year	No.	%	No.	%	No.	%
2020	2,077	42.81%	2,718	56.02%	57	1.17%
2014	942	48.43%	948	48.74%	55	2.83%
2013	847	54.65%	690	44.52%	13	0.84%
2008	1,786	50.98%	1,640	46.82%	77	2.20%

== Education ==
The Boonton Public Schools serve students in pre-kindergarten through twelfth grade. As of the 2024–25 school year, the district, comprised of three schools, had an enrollment of 1,559 students and 150.6 classroom teachers (on an FTE basis), for a student–teacher ratio of 10.4:1. Schools in the district (with 2024–25 enrollment statistics from the National Center for Education Statistics) are School Street School with 325 students in grades PreK–2, John Hill School with 556 students in grades 3–8 and Boonton High School with 646 students in grades 9–12.

The district's high school serves students from Boonton and also those from Lincoln Park, who attend as part of a sending/receiving relationship with the Lincoln Park Public Schools, with Lincoln Park students accounting for a majority of students at the high school, including about 290 students as of the 2012–2013 school year. The two districts have sought to sever the more than 50-year-old relationship, citing cost savings that could be achieved by both districts and complaints by Lincoln Park that it is granted only one seat on the Boonton Public Schools' Board of Education. In April 2006, the Commissioner of the New Jersey Department of Education rejected the request.

Our Lady of Mount Carmel School is a Catholic school for students in preschool through eighth grade. Operated under the auspices of the Roman Catholic Diocese of Paterson, the school has been in operation though the parish as far back as 1882.

== Transportation ==
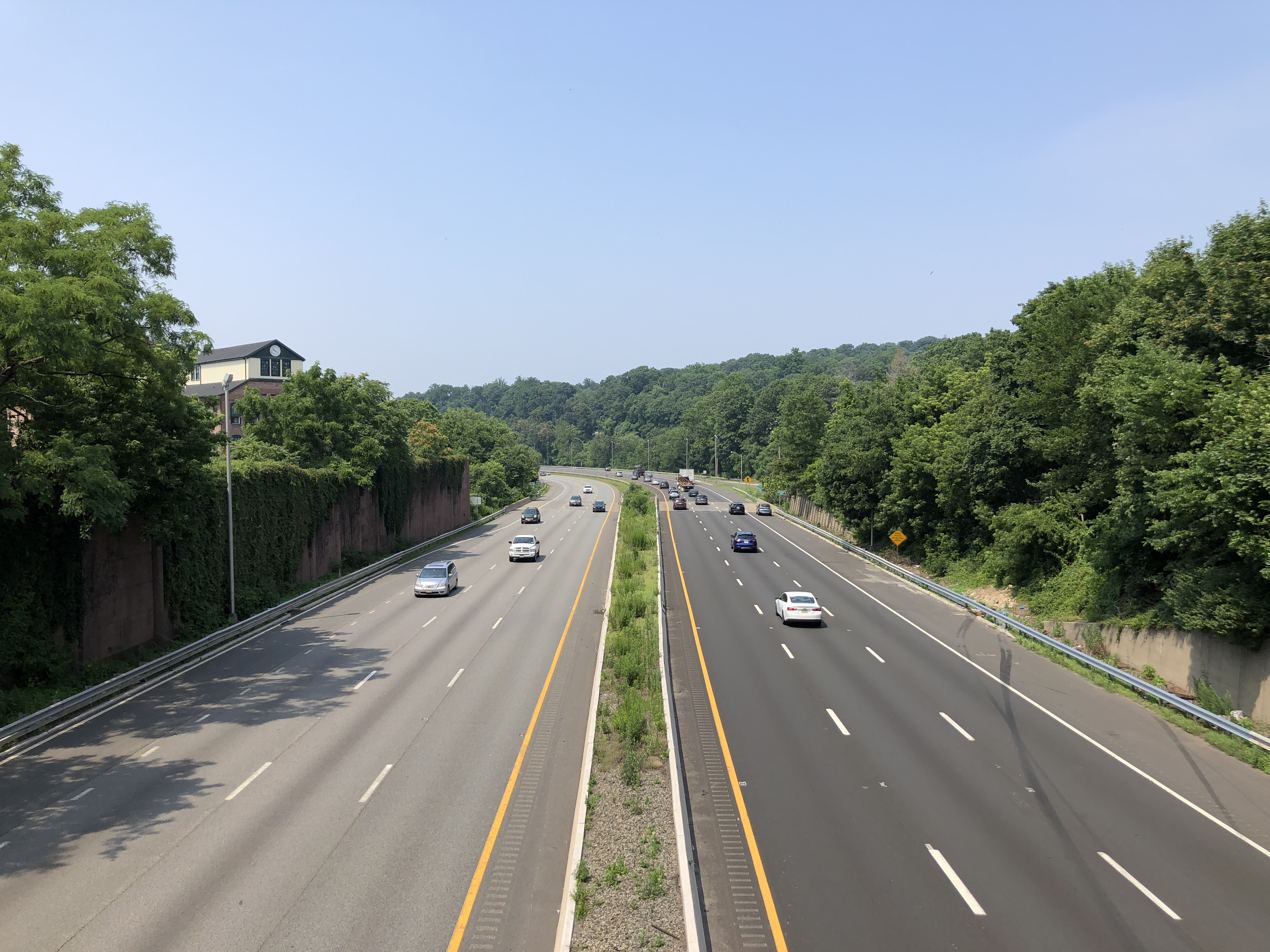
Interstate 287 southbound in Boonton

=== Roads and highways ===
As of May 2010, the town had a total of 33.90 miles (54.56 km) of roadways, of which 28.34 miles (45.61 km) were maintained by the municipality, 3.81 miles (6.13 km) by Morris County and 1.75 miles (2.82 km) by the New Jersey Department of Transportation.

Interstate 287 and U.S. Route 202 run through the center of town.

=== Public transportation ===
Commuter rail service is provided at the Boonton station. NJ Transit provides trains on the Montclair-Boonton Line with service to Newark Broad Street Station, New York Penn Station and Hoboken Terminal.

NJ Transit bus service is provided on the 871 local route, which replaced service offered until 2010 on the MCM1 route.

Lakeland Bus Lines provides express bus service along Route 46 between Dover and the Port Authority Bus Terminal in Midtown Manhattan.

== Places of interest ==
- Arch Bridge from the Boonton Ironworks – The single-span fieldstone arch bridge built in 1866 was listed on the National Register of Historic Places in 2022, for its significance in engineering. The footbridge, which crosses the Rockaway River, is located in Grace Lord Park.
- Garret Rickards House – One of two octagon houses on Cornelia Street that contribute to the Boonton Historic District, listed on the NRHP.
- Morris Canal Greenway – The Boonton section of the trail, which follows the route of the former Morris Canal, starts in Grace Lord Park. Plane Street is at the site of Inclined Plane 7 East of the canal.
- Greenwood Cemetery
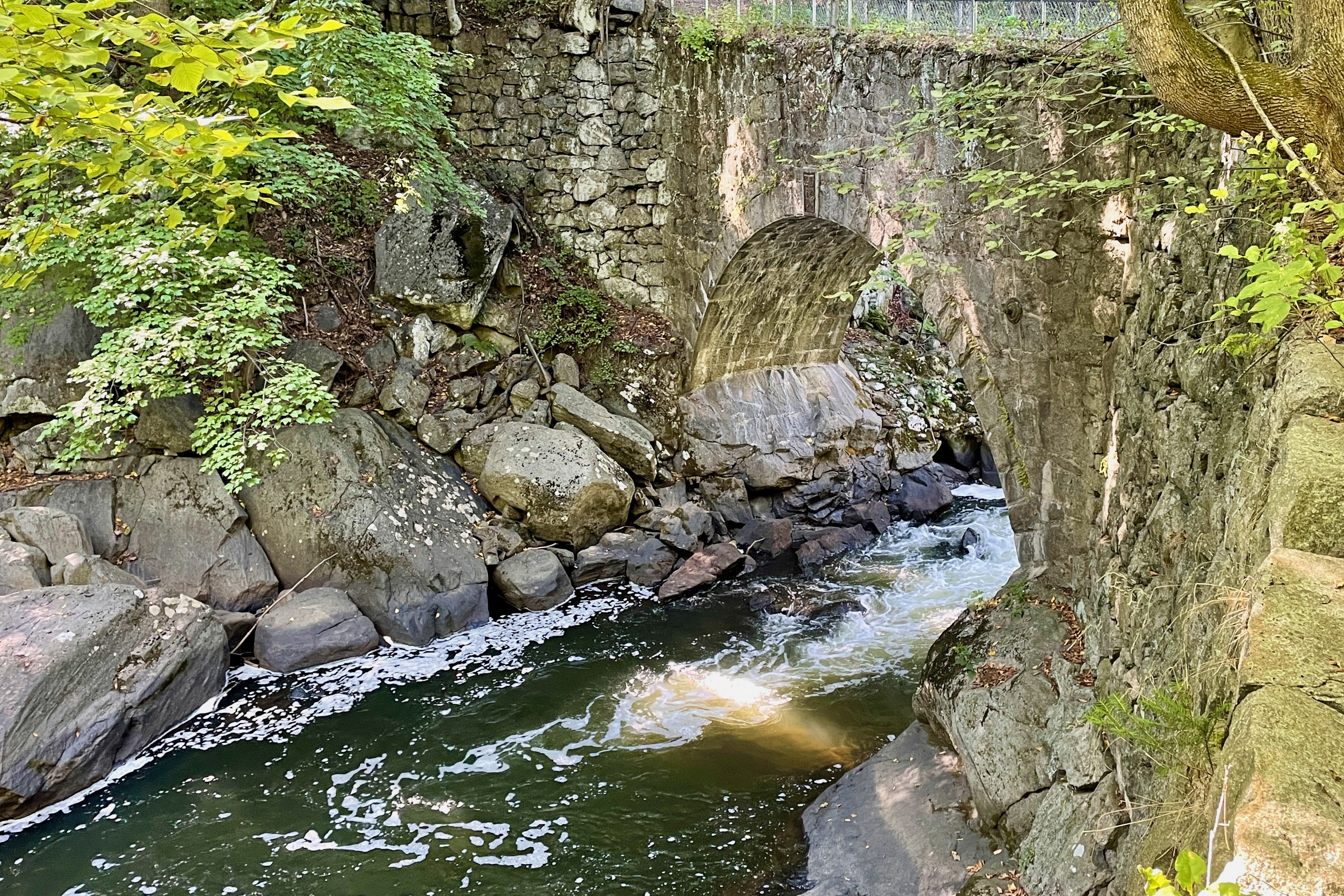
Arch Bridge from the Boonton Ironworks

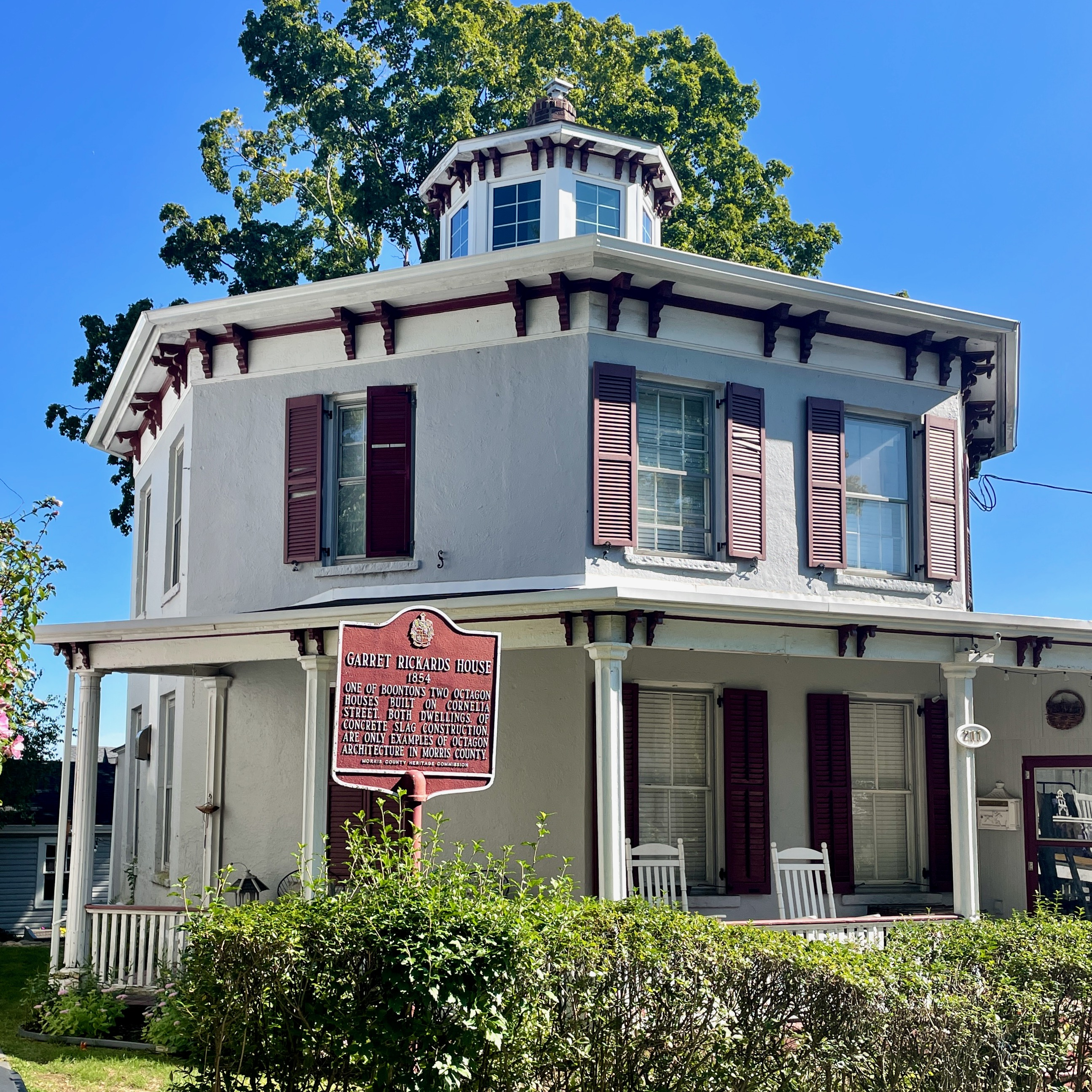
Garret Rickards House

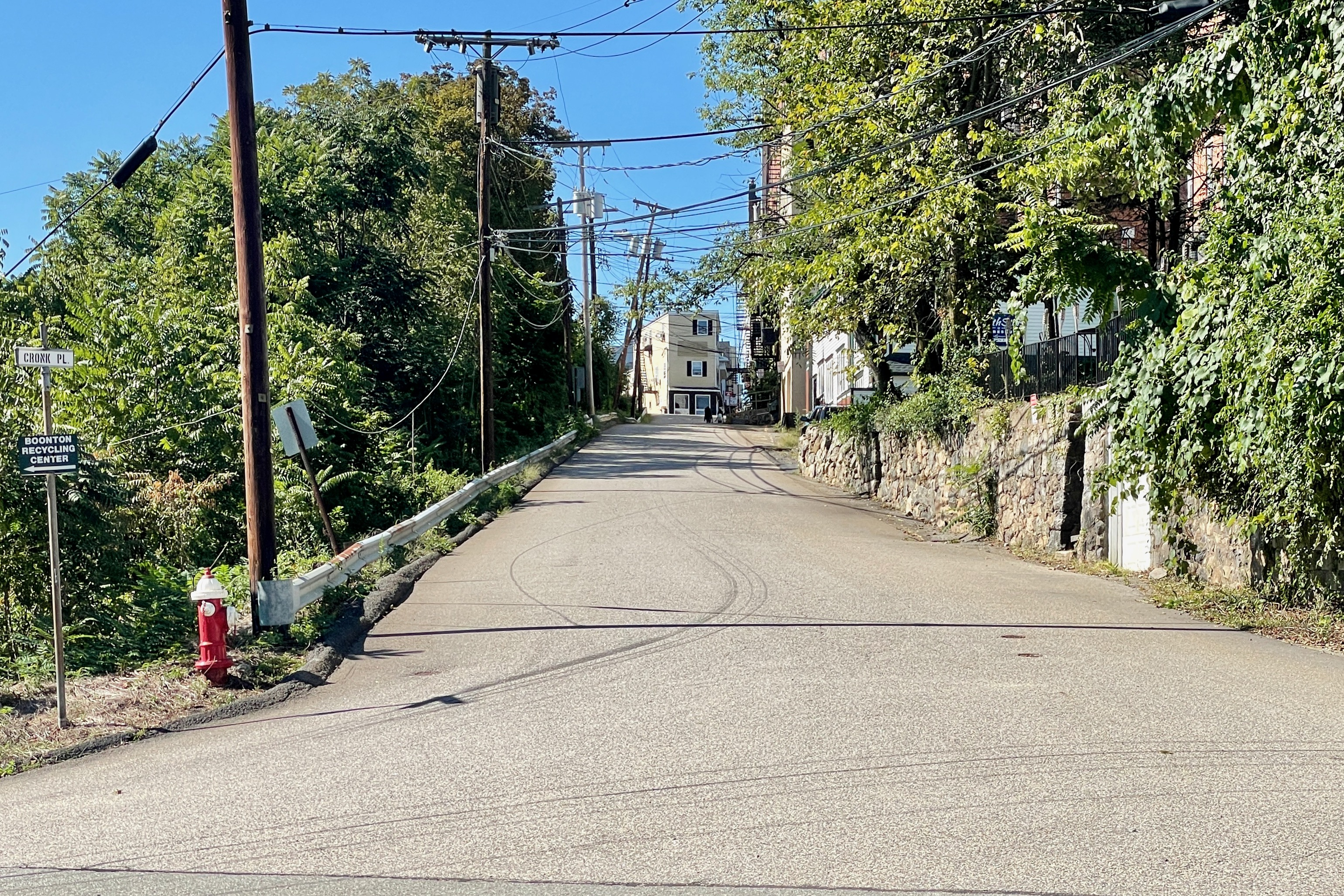
Plane Street – Site of Inclined Plane 7 East of the Morris Canal

== Boonton Holmes Public Library ==
The Boonton Holmes Public Library has been in operation since 1894. The building in which it resides was willed to the Town of Boonton by James Holmes for use as a public library. Holmes moved to Boonton in 1850 to take charge of the Taylor & Lord Nail Factory. Holmes held several political posts in his life such as serving as Mayor of Boonton, on the State Board of Education, and on the Boonton Board of Education. Holmes used his wealth to improve the town, as when he donated the land and purchased the equipment to begin a firehouse in South Boonton. Holmes also started the first Boonton National Bank and served as its president.

The building itself dates much further back to when Eliza A. Scott purchased the corner lot in 1849 from the New Jersey Iron Company and built the first structure on the site in that same year. Holmes bought the property and two lots for $5,000 in 1856. He resided at his mansion house until his death in February 1893. Holmes bequeathed his house and lots to the Boonton Library Association which had incorporated in 1890. The gift included the mansion house, $5,000 for endowment purposes only, $2,000 for refitting the house as a library, and $1,000 for the purchase of books. The Library officially opened in 1894.

Since its opening, the library itself has only been on the first floor, and in later years the basement. The upper two floors have been used, at various times, as business space, a Masonic Hall, and most recently as three apartments. The basement also has been used commercially and has at one time housed the printing press for the Boonton Times newspaper. In 1895, Charles Grubb rented rooms in the Holmes Library and installed presses in the basement where on October 4, 1895, he published the first issue of The Boonton Times newspaper. In 1911, he moved to the corner of Main and Cornelia Streets.

The Boonton Holmes Public Library was placed on the National Register of Historic Places, on November 30, 1972.

== Notable people ==
People who were born in, residents of, or otherwise closely associated with Boonton include:

- Othmar Ammann (1879–1965), structural engineer whose designs include the George Washington Bridge, Verrazzano–Narrows Bridge and Bayonne Bridge
- Angelo Badalamenti (1937-2022), composer and arranger known for his work in composing for films.
- Daniel Belardinelli (born 1961), outsider artist, attorney and art curator
- Amanda Bennett (born 1952), Pulitzer Prize-winning journalist and editor
- Anthony M. Bucco (born 1962), member of the New Jersey Senate who served with his father in the New Jersey Legislature after taking office in the Assembly in 2010 and took over his father's Senate seat
- Anthony R. Bucco (1938–2019), member of the New Jersey Senate who served until his death
- John A. Carpenter (1921–1978), historian, history professor and public speaker who specialized in the Reconstruction Era following the American Civil War
- Robert H. Conn (1925–2020), United States Deputy Under Secretary of the Navy (Financial Management and Senior Data Processing Official) from 1981 to 1984 and Assistant Secretary of the Navy (Financial Management and Comptroller) from 1984 to 1988
- Herbert Dargue (1886–1941), aviation pioneer and major general in the Army Air Forces, who was one of the first ten recipients of the Distinguished Flying Cross
- Mario DeMarco (1924–1956), professional Canadian football and NFL player who died in the Trans-Canada Air Lines Flight 810 disaster
- Don Edwards (1939–2022), singing cowboy
- Helen Gahagan Douglas (1900–1980), actress and politician
- Dean Gallo (1935–1994), politician who represented New Jersey's 11th congressional district from 1985 until his death
- John Hill (1821–1884), represented New Jersey's 4th congressional district from 1867 to 1873, and New Jersey's 5th congressional district from 1881 to 1883
- Thomas J. Hillery (1871–1920), President of the New Jersey Senate
- Elizabeth Hoffman Honness (1904–2003), author of children's literature
- Andrew D. Hurwitz (born 1947), Judge on the United States Court of Appeals for the Ninth Circuit
- Jim Lewis (born 1955), writer for The Muppets
- Frank Makosky (1910–1987), Major League Baseball pitcher who played for the New York Yankees
- Peter Onorati (born 1954), actor
- Joshua S. Salmon (1846–1902), represented New Jersey's 4th congressional district from 1902 to 1903
- Jeffrey L. Seglin (born 1956) journalist, writer and teacher at Emerson, Harvard and elsewhere

== In popular culture ==
Boonton features in and was a location for the 2023 movie Jules, starring Ben Kingsley.

The town appears as the fictional Dartford, New Hampshire in season six of The Sopranos.
