= Boonton Reservoir =

Reservoir in New Jersey, US

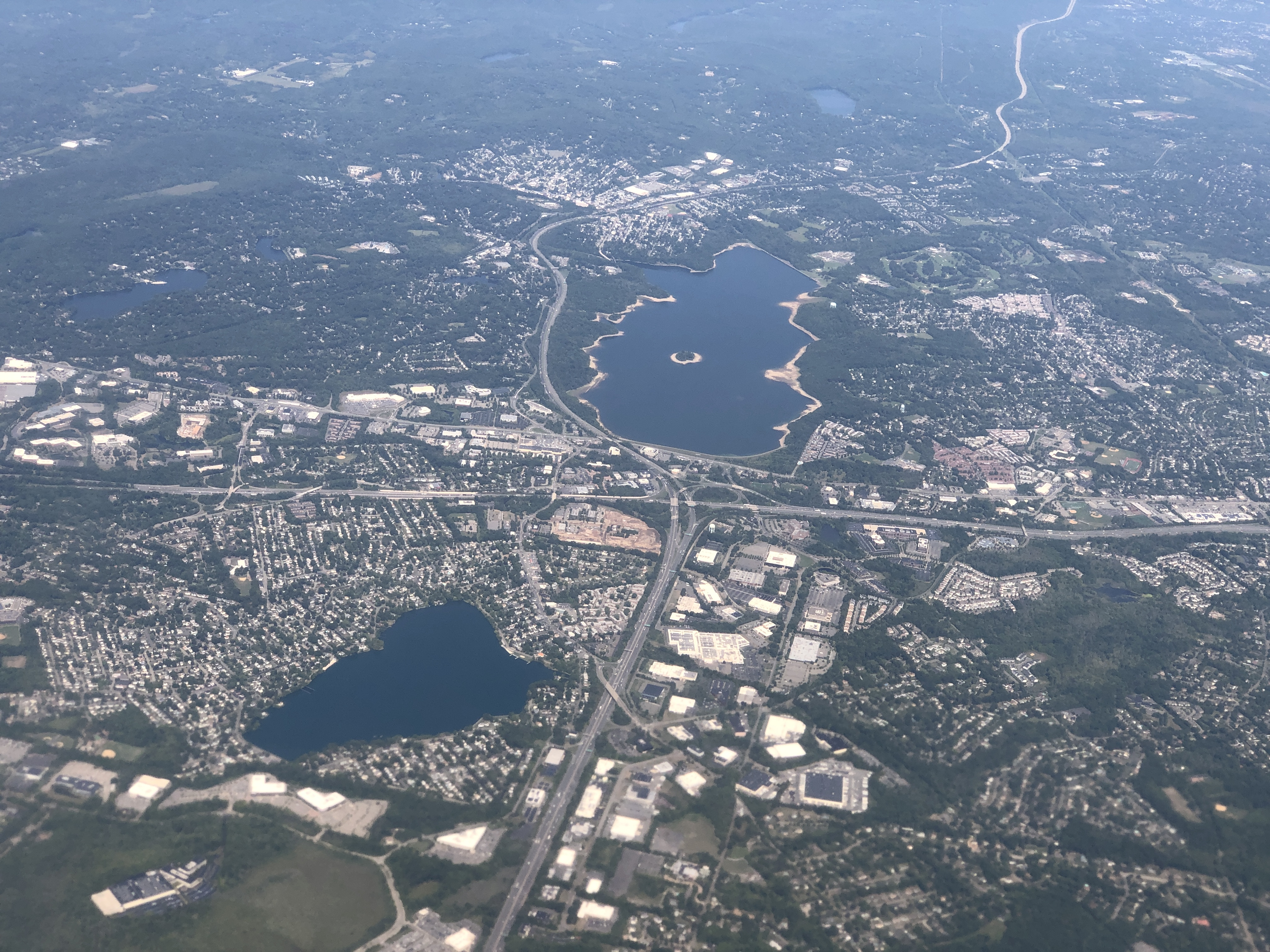
- Boonton Reservoir in the upper center, just north of Interstate 80 and just east of Interstate 287

- Location within New Jersey Location within the United States
- Location: Boonton / Parsippany–Troy Hills; Morris County, New Jersey
- Coordinates: 40°52′57″N 74°24′29″W
- Type: Reservoir
- Basin countries: United States
- Water volume: 7,620,000,000 US gal (2.88×10^{10} L)
- Surface elevation: 305.25 ft (93.04 m)
- Settlements: Jersey City, New Jersey

The Boonton Reservoir is a 700-acre (280 ha) reservoir located between Boonton and Parsippany–Troy Hills, New Jersey. Boonton, along with nearby Splitrock Reservoir, provides water for Jersey City, New Jersey. It was formed by the construction of a dam on the Rockaway River completed in 1904 on the site of the original town of Boonton.

On April 11, 1904, professional diver William Hoar was attempting to close an intake pipe in the new reservoir when the suction of the water caught Hoar's left leg between the pipe and the nearly 5,000-pound (2,300 kg) ball closing it. Despite extensive rescue efforts, Hoar would die after surviving 70 feet (21 m) underwater for 24 hours.

On September 26, 1908, the reservoir's waters were the first municipal water supply in the US to be continuously chlorinated. The chlorination system was devised by John L. Leal and the facility was designed by George W. Fuller.

In June 2014, Jersey City installed a new $5.8-million (equivalent to $7.55 million in 2024) gravity pipeline that brings water from the reservoir to the on-site treatment facility. The new pipeline is more energy efficient and is expected to save the city $375,000 annually in electricity costs. It replaced the former pipeline which pumped water uphill to the treatment facility and was more energy-intensive.

On September 28, 2018, officials from Jersey City and the Morris County Park Commission announced a plan to create a nature preserve and 7.7-mile (12.4 km) educational hiking trail around the reservoir that will allow for passive recreation while protecting the water supply with additional security measures. Phase 1 of the trail construction was expected to break ground in 2022.

== Incidents ==
In March 2019, a body was found floating in the reservoir, eventually identified as Boonton resident Sean Stohl who had been reported missing since November 2018. On August 23, 2020, the body of a 55-year-old female was recovered by dive teams and a state police chopper.
