= Rockaway River =

River in New Jersey, United States

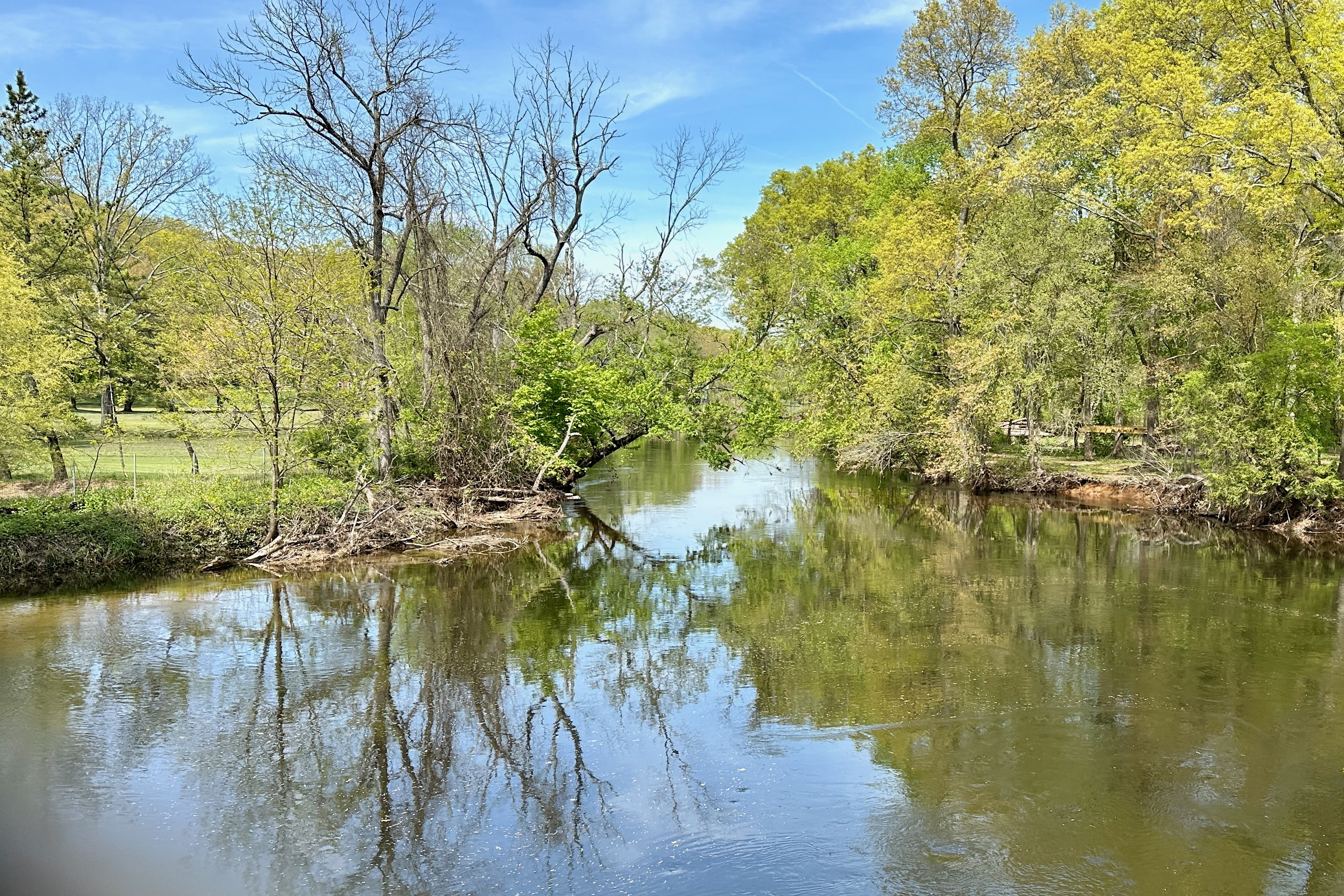
- Rockaway River in Denville

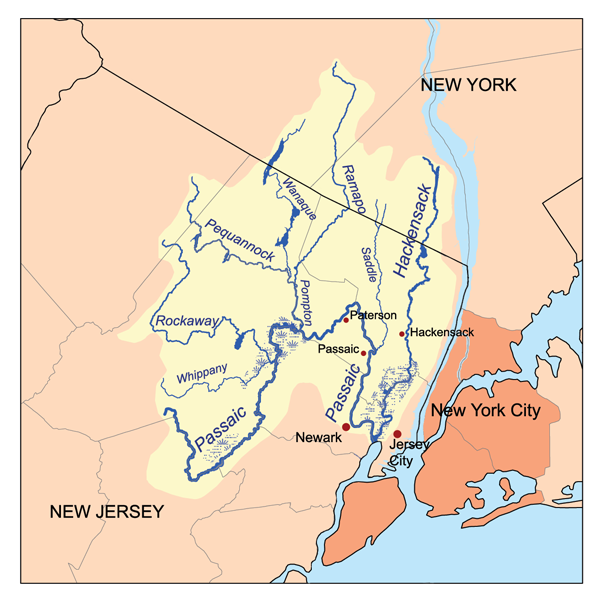
- Map of the Passaic/Hackensack watershed

- Location within Morris County, New Jersey

Location
- Country: United States
- State: New Jersey
- County: Morris County

Physical characteristics
- Source
  - location: Oak Ridge
  - coordinates: 41°01′52″N 74°28′21″W
- Mouth: Passaic River
  - location: Pine Brook
  - coordinates: 40°50′58″N 74°19′49″W

Basin features
- River system: Passaic River
- GNIS feature ID: 879755

The Rockaway River is a tributary of the Passaic River, approximately 35 mi (56 km) long, in Morris County, New Jersey in the United States. The upper course of the river flows through a wooded mountainous valley, whereas the lower course flows through the populated New Jersey suburbs and former industrial area west of New York City. It drains an area of approximately 130 sq mi (340 km²).

== Course ==
The Rockaway River rises in the Oak Ridge neighborhood of Jefferson Township. It flows SSW, in a direct course between in the valley between the mountain ridges. Northeast of Wharton it emerges from the mountains and flows generally east in a meandering course, past Wharton, Dover (where it enters a concrete channel), Rockaway, Denville and Boonton, where it passes through the Boonton Gorge. The gorge begins with the impressive 25 foot Boonton Falls. It continues for a little over 1 mile (1.6 km) dropping around 120 feet per mile (23 m/km) through nearly continuous class 3 and 4 whitewater. On the south side of Boonton it is impounded to form the Boonton Reservoir. Downstream from the reservoir dam it flows south, through Lake Hiawatha, where the river splits and joins again. It then flows through Parsippany and into Hatfield Swamp, where it is joined by the Whippany River and then merges with the Passaic River.

Beaver brook is a stream that flows through a swamp and enters the Rockaway River in Denville.

In the 19th century the river connected to the Morris Canal near Wharton and served as an industrial transportation link for shipping coal and iron ore between Pennsylvania and New York City. The communities of Wharton, Dover, and Boonton were important iron processing towns in the early 19th century, with a large concentration of forges and mills. The significant pollution problem in the lower course of the river has been somewhat alleviated by legislation and by the nearly complete abandonment of heavy industry in the area.

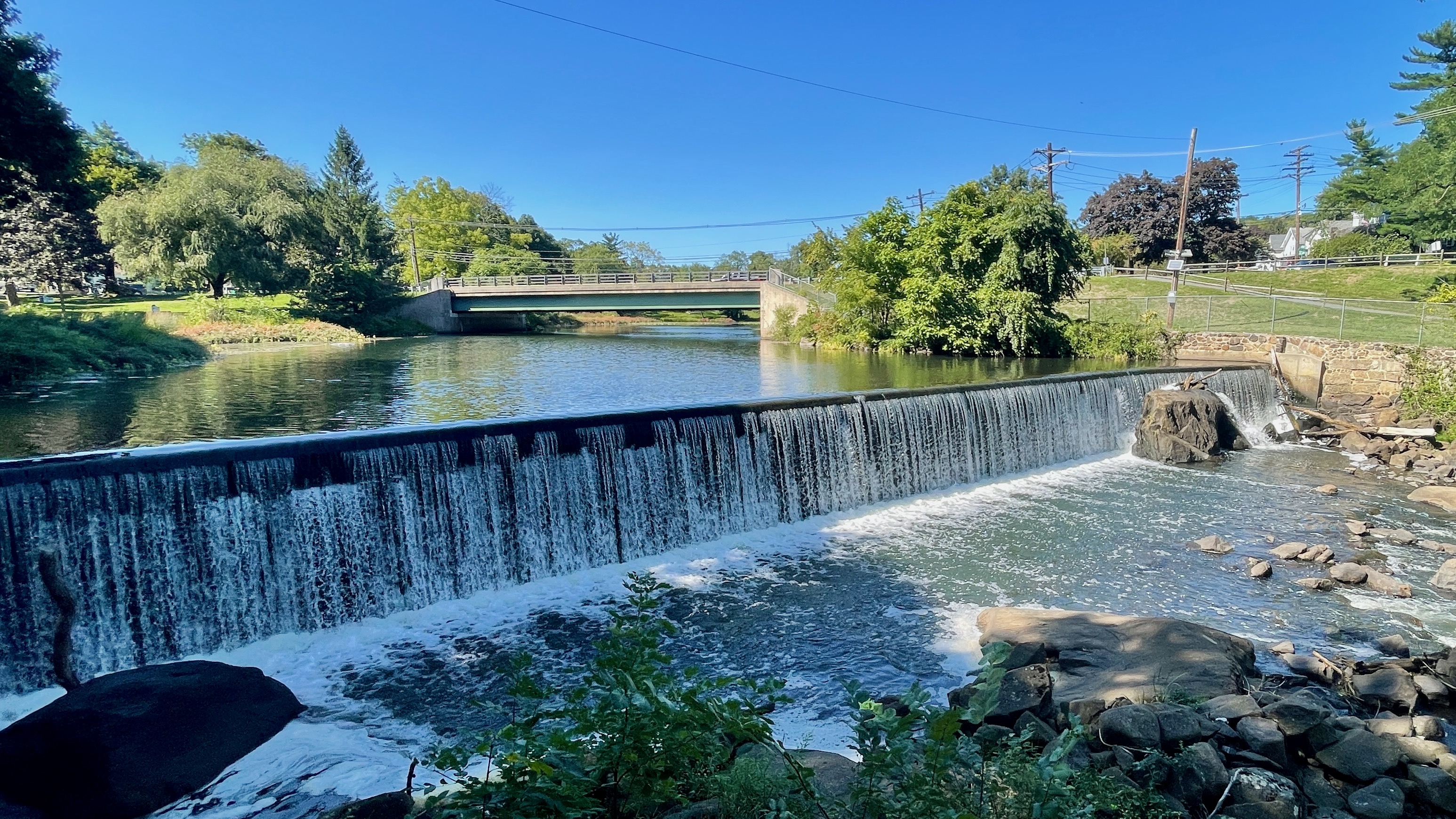
Morris Canal dam on the river at the start of the Boonton Gorge in Boonton

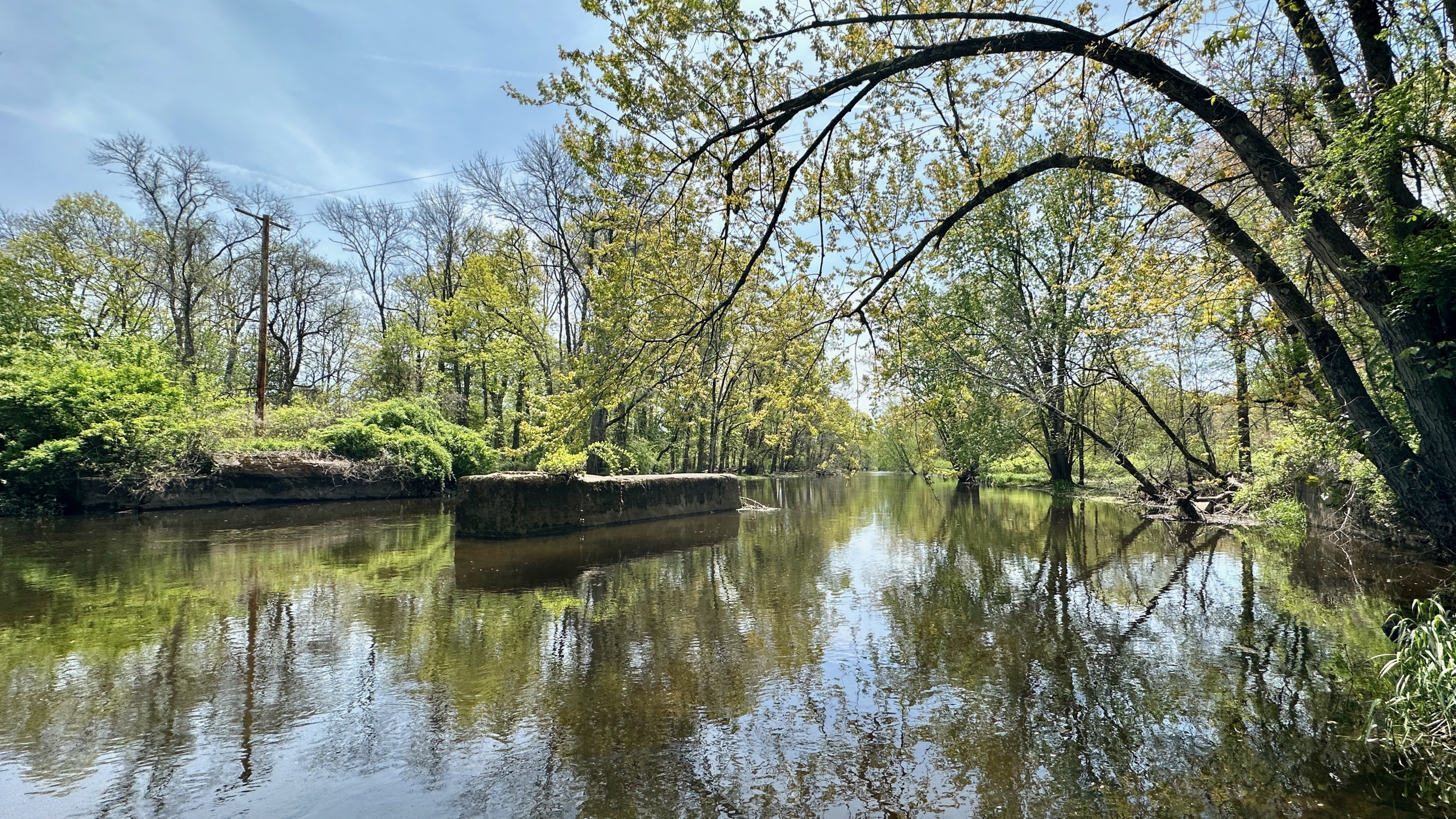
Piers of the former Denville Aqueduct for the Morris Canal over the river

The isolated upper course of the river is a popular region site for smallmouth bass fishing.

The New Jersey Fish and Game stocks the river in many sections with rainbow and brown trout. Many fisherman find enjoyment in fishing the river.

The river is shown in the movie, The Station Agent, and also appears in one episode of The Sopranos.

== Flooding ==
The Rockaway River has the potential to cause flooding in the area of Denville that is north of the central business district, including residential areas along the river. During the massive flooding following Hurricane Irene in August 2011, the Rockaway River crested approx. 6 feet above its previous record flood level. The flooding was considered to be a 500-year event. The downtown Denville business district and surrounding residential areas were flooded, by in some places up to 8 feet of water. As silt has accumulated in the river basin, the average depth of the river has steadily decreased. Since the flooding of Irene there have been no problems reported with the river overreaching its banks. Discussions are ongoing with the Township of Denville and the Army Corps of Engineers as to a solution, including the control of dams upstream which may have contributed to the downtown flooding.

== Tributaries ==
- Den Brook
- Whippany River

== See also ==
- List of New Jersey rivers
