= Lincoln Park Public Schools (New Jersey) =

School district in Morris County, New Jersey, US

Address
- 92 Ryerson Road Lincoln Park, Morris County, New Jersey, 07035; United States
- Coordinates: 40.935125°N 74.296512°W

District information
- Grades: PreK-8
- Superintendent: Robert Mooney (interim)
- Business administrator: Victor Anaya (interim)
- Schools: 2

Students and staff
- Enrollment: 900 (as of 2023–24)
- Faculty: 87.7 FTEs
- Student–teacher ratio: 10.3:1

Other information
- District Factor Group: FG
- Website: www.lincolnparkboe.org
Ind.	Per pupil	District spending	Rank (*)	K-8 average	%± vs. average
1A	Total Spending	$17,807	51	$18,891	−5.7%
1	Budgetary Cost	12,251	17	14,159	−13.5%
2	Classroom Instruction	7,670	19	8,659	−11.4%
6	Support Services	1,395	7	2,167	−35.6%
8	Administrative Cost	1,715	61	1,547	10.9%
10	Operations & Maintenance	1,399	28	1,612	−13.2%
13	Extracurricular Activities	72	25	104	−30.8%
16	Median Teacher Salary	59,085	26	61,136
Data from NJDoE 2014 Taxpayers' Guide to Education Spending. *Of K-8 districts with more than 750 students. Lowest spending=1; Highest=84

The Lincoln Park Public Schools is a community public school district that serves students in pre-kindergarten through eighth grade from Lincoln Park, in Morris County, in the U.S. state of New Jersey.

As of the 2023–24 school year, the district, comprised of two schools, had an enrollment of 900 students and 87.7 classroom teachers (on an FTE basis), for a student–teacher ratio of 10.3:1.

For ninth through twelfth grades, Lincoln Park public school students attend Boonton High School in Boonton as part of a sending/receiving relationship with the Boonton Public Schools, with Lincoln Park students accounting for a majority of students at the high school. As of the 2023–24 school year, the high school had an enrollment of 656 students and 59.8 classroom teachers (on an FTE basis), for a student–teacher ratio of 11.0:1.

During the 2015–16 school year, there were about 70 students from the borough attending the academy programs of the Morris County Vocational School District, which include the Morris County School of Technology in Denville Township; The Academy for Mathematics, Science, and Engineering in Rockaway at Morris Hills High School; and the Academy for Law and Public Safety in Butler at Butler High School.

== History ==
Starting with the 1930–31 school year, students in Lincoln Park were formally assigned by the state to attend Boonton High School, with 62 students being sent there to attend for grades 9–12, before which they could attend the high school of their choice by paying tuition. In 2001, the Lincoln Park district sought to sever the more-than-50-year-old sending relationship with Boonton, citing cost savings that could be achieved by both districts and complaints by Lincoln Park that it is granted only one seat on the Boonton Public Schools' Board of Education, less than the number of seats that would be allocated based on the percentage of students of population. In April 2006, the commissioner of the New Jersey Department of Education rejected the request, citing the negative effects on the Boonton district of the loss of students from Lincoln Park.

The district had been classified by the New Jersey Department of Education as being in District Factor Group "FG", the fourth-highest of eight groupings. District Factor Groups organize districts statewide to allow comparison by common socioeconomic characteristics of the local districts. From lowest socioeconomic status to highest, the categories are A, B, CD, DE, FG, GH, I and J.

School superintendent Michael Meyer left his position after an unexpected shortfall of $2 million led to a $27 million budget for the upcoming school year that included 20 layoffs.

== Schools ==
Schools in the district (with 2023–24 enrollment data from the National Center for Education Statistics) are:

Elementary school

- Lincoln Park Elementary School with 522 students in grades PreK–4
  - Melissa Bammer, principal

Middle school

- Lincoln Park Middle School with 366 students in grades 5–8
  - David Winston, principal

== Administration ==
Core members of the district's administration are:

- Robert Mooney, interim superintendent
- Victor Anaya, interim business administrator and board secretary

== Board of education ==
The district's board of education, comprised of seven members, sets policy and oversees the fiscal and educational operation of the district through its administration. As a Type II school district, the board's trustees are elected directly by voters to serve three-year terms of office on a staggered basis, with either two or three seats up for election each year held (since 2012) as part of the November general election. The board appoints a superintendent to oversee the district's day-to-day operations and a business administrator to supervise the business functions of the district.
