= Lincoln Park History Museum =

Historic site in Lincoln Park, New Jersey, United States

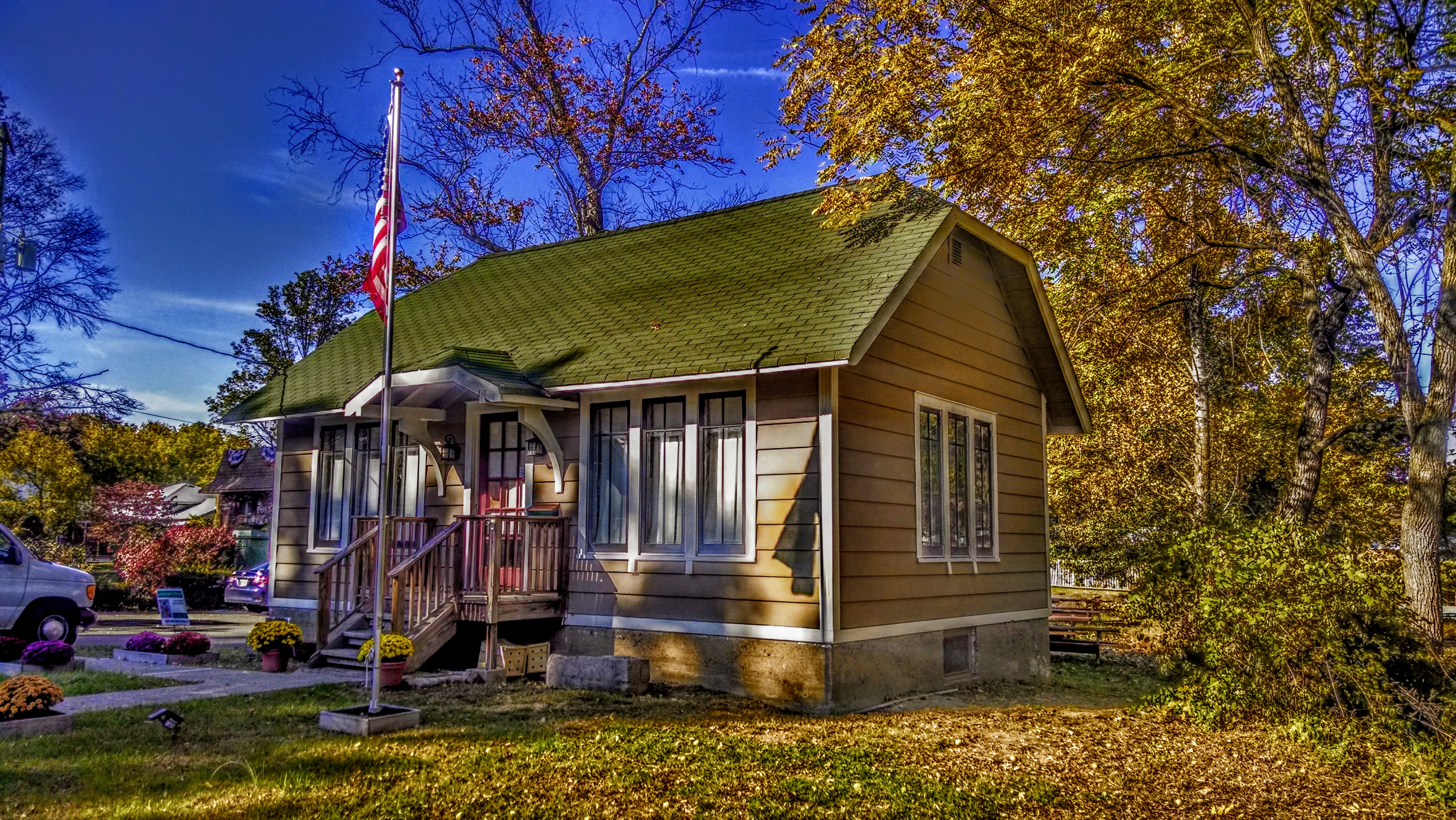
- The museum as seen from U.S. Route 202

- Location within Morris County, New Jersey Location within New Jersey Location within the United States
- 40.9230428°N 74.3119051°W
- Location: 137 Main Street; Lincoln Park, New Jersey

History
- Built: 1927

Site notes
- Area: 5.9 acres (2.4 ha)

The Lincoln Park History Museum is an early-20th-century library and historic site located between U.S. Route 202 and the Morris Canal in Lincoln Park, New Jersey. It was built in 1927 as a public library serving the citizens of rural Lincoln Park. Since its decommissioning, it has served a different role as a history museum with exhibits about Lincoln Park, the Morris Canal, and New Jersey. The site features canal sleeper stones, a section of Roebling cable, and a path to the decommissioned Morris Canal. The museum site is a part of the much larger Benjamin Estate which includes the Terhune Benjamin House. The site is owned by the Borough of Lincoln Park and managed by the Lincoln Park Historical Society.

== Early history and ownership ==
In 1917, a group of local married couples founds "The Fellowship Club," a local social group. They headquartered in an old stone house, rented for the purpose, and the first local library was located in that building as of 1920. On March 11, 1922, the Beavertown area of Pequannock Township was incorporated as the borough of Lincoln Park by an act of the New Jersey State Legislature. During this year, the library also outgrew its home in the old stone house and its operators, "The Lincoln Park Public Library Association," under the auspices of librarian Mrs. Ella Perry, sought another site. Later, on February 26, 1925, the borough is reincorporated. The Benjamin Estate donates a parcel of land on Main Street for construction of the library. Local groups, "The Players" and the local home and school association donate towards the construction, but ultimately the library is funded through a $600 mortgage.

By late 1927, construction on the new library is complete and the library repays its $600 mortgage and maintains its self-sufficient operations via local funding consisting of membership fees, book sales, and bake sales. David Benjamin Sr. donated his expertise to design and construct the wooden library building which contains no plumbing is illuminated almost entirely via large windows in each wall.

From 1931 to 1934, the municipality begins to subsidize the operations of the library with an annual budget of $50 and in 1934, the library becomes fully funded by the municipality. The library operates this way until 1965 when, by referendum, it is decided to remove the library from the county system and operate it as a free independent library.

== 1965 to 2015 ==
In 1966, the Beavertown Historical Society is founded. On November 26, 1967, ground is broken for the construction of a new municipal library funded via a local bond of $134,000.00 and a government grant of $86,129.00. The Lincoln Park Public Library opens the doors of its new building in 1969 and the Beavertown Historical Society take over operation of the old wooden library as a history museum.

By 2005, the Beavertown Historical Society suffers from low membership, with some members moving away from the area as they retire and between 2006 and 2008 the exterior of the building is repainted by a local Eagle Scout. Multiple factors conspire to shorten the lifespan of the new paintwork. As of 2010, the Lincoln Park History Museum is open only intermittently and suffers interior damage from a roof leak which requires major repairs to the roof and extensive drywall replacement. Repairs to the roof by the municipality prevent the complete loss of the building over the ensuing years. A single remaining member and a few new volunteers undertake the project to restore the interior of the building to usable condition, but funds are unavailable and work moves slowly.

== 2016 to present ==
In February 2016, a meeting organized by the municipality and led by then Beavertown Historical Society President George Shanoian is held. Following this meeting, membership increases to 44 paying members and numerous volunteers. Volunteers complete the spackling and painting of the interior. A local contractor volunteers to restore the original wood floors. In May 2016, the Lincoln Park History Museum resumed regular operation with two open days each month, special events, and group tours by appointment. A local Eagle Scout repaints the exterior of the building in colors historically appropriate the era of the building's construction. A local landscaper completes a series of raised flower beds framing the entrance to the building. The museum is now operated by a reorganized Beavertown Historical Society known as the Lincoln Park Historical Society.
