= Zeliff =

Zeliff is a surname. Notable people with the surname include:

- Amzi Emmons Zeliff (1831–1915), American businessman and folk painter
- Bill Zeliff (1936–2021), American politician from New Hampshire
