= Lincoln Park, New Jersey =

Borough in Morris County, New Jersey, US

- Borough
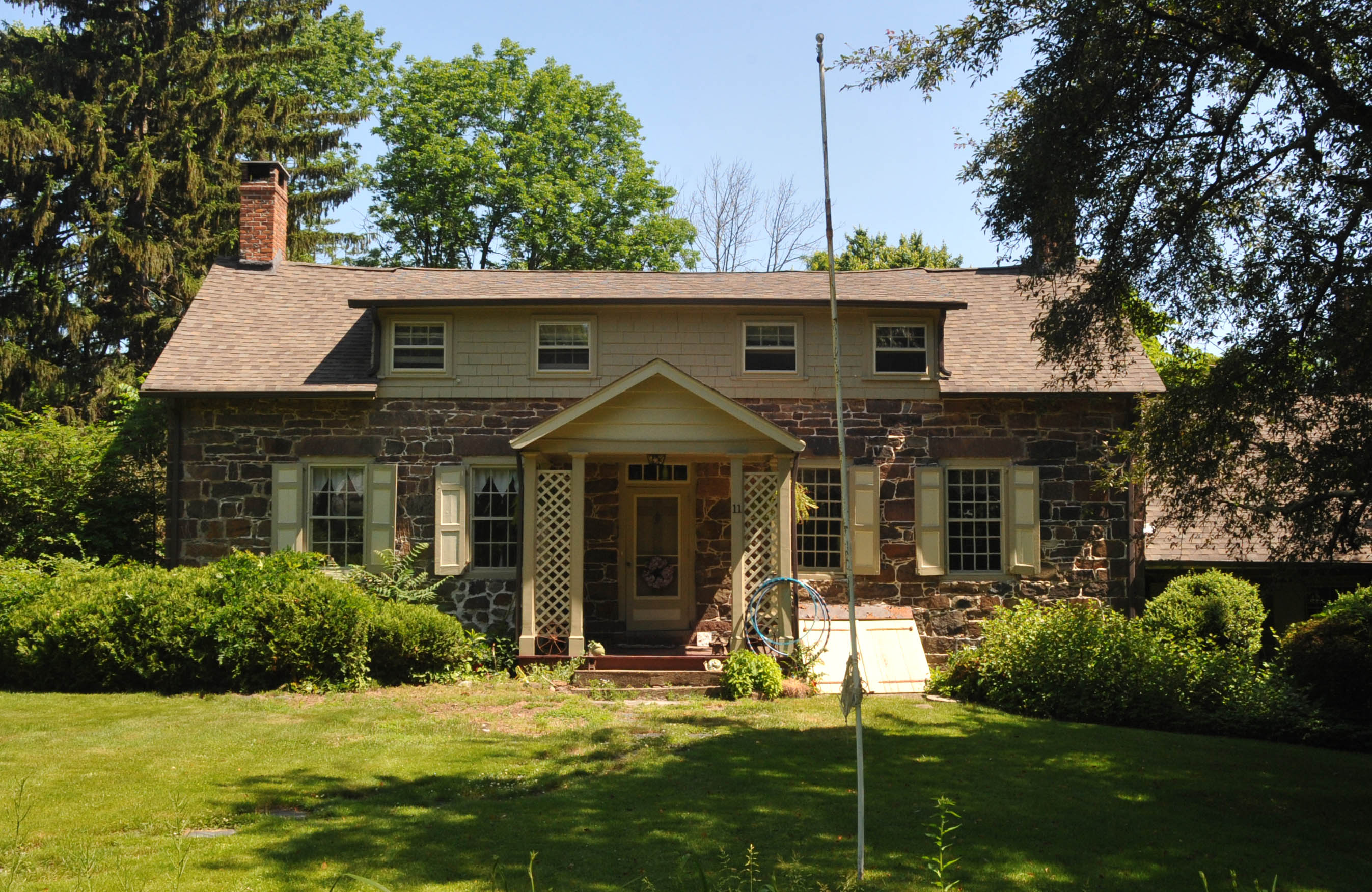
- John Dods House, listed on the National Register of Historic Places

- Seal

- Location of Lincoln Park in Morris County highlighted in red (right). Inset map: Location of Morris County in New Jersey highlighted in orange (left).

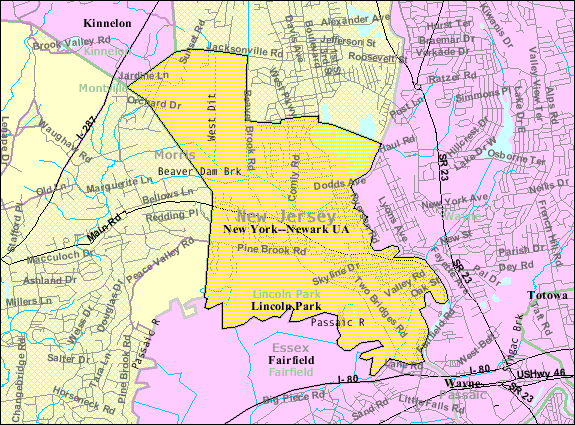
- Census Bureau map of Lincoln Park, New Jersey

- Location in Morris County Location in New Jersey Location in the United States
- Coordinates: 40.923751°N 74.304235°W
- Country: United States
- State: New Jersey
- County: Morris
- Incorporated: March 11, 1922
- Named for: Abraham Lincoln

Government
  - Type: Faulkner Act (mayor–council)
  - Body: Borough Council
  - Mayor: David A. Runfeldt (R, term ends December 31, 2026)
  - Administrator: Perry Mayers
  - Municipal clerk: Courtney Fitzpatrick

Area
  - Total: 6.92 sq mi (17.92 km^{2})
  - Land: 6.40 sq mi (16.57 km^{2})
  - Water: 0.52 sq mi (1.35 km^{2}) 7.47%
- Elevation: 180 ft (55 m)

Population (2020)
  - Total: 10,915
  - Estimate (2023): 10,951
  - Rank: 231st of 565 in state 19th of 39 in county
  - Density: 1,706/sq mi (659/km^{2})
  - Rank: 320th of 565 in state 17th of 39 in county
- Time zone: UTC−05:00 (Eastern (EST))
  - Summer (DST): UTC−04:00 (Eastern (EDT))
- ZIP Code: 07035
- Area code: 973
- FIPS code: 3402740290
- GNIS feature ID: 0885277
- Website: www.lincolnpark.org

Lincoln Park is a borough in Morris County, in the U.S. state of New Jersey. As of the 2020 United States census, the borough's population was 10,915, an increase of 394 (+3.7%) from the 2010 census count of 10,521, which in turn reflected a decline of 409 (−3.7%) from the 10,930 counted in the 2000 census.

Lincoln Park was incorporated as a borough by an act of the New Jersey Legislature on March 11, 1922, from portions of Pequannock Township. The borough was reincorporated on February 26, 1925. The borough was named for President Abraham Lincoln. The borough is situated in the easternmost part of Morris County bordering both Essex and Passaic counties along the Passaic and Pompton rivers.

New Jersey Monthly magazine ranked Lincoln Park as its 5th best place to live in its 2008 rankings of the "Best Places To Live" in the state.

== Geography ==
Lincoln Park contains the easternmost point in Morris County, which is located along the Pompton River.

According to the United States Census Bureau, the borough had a total area of 6.91 square miles (17.91 km^{2}), including 6.40 square miles (16.57 km^{2}) of land and 0.52 square miles (1.34 km^{2}) of water (7.47%).

The borough borders Kinnelon, Montville, and Pequannock Township in Morris County; Fairfield Township in Essex County; and Wayne in Passaic County.

== Demographics ==
Historical population
Census	Pop.	Note	%±
1930	1,831		—
1940	2,186		19.4%
1950	3,376		54.4%
1960	6,048		79.1%
1970	9,034		49.4%
1980	8,806		−2.5%
1990	10,978		24.7%
2000	10,930		−0.4%
2010	10,521		−3.7%
2020	10,915		3.7%
2023 (est.)	10,951	▲	0.3%
Population sources: 1930 1940–2000; 2000 2010 2020

=== 2020 census ===
As of the 2020 census, Lincoln Park had a population of 10,915. The median age was 45.8 years. 17.4% of residents were under the age of 18 and 21.5% of residents were 65 years of age or older. For every 100 females there were 93.7 males, and for every 100 females age 18 and over there were 90.5 males age 18 and over.

100.0% of residents lived in urban areas, while 0.0% lived in rural areas.

There were 4,063 households in Lincoln Park, of which 27.4% had children under the age of 18 living in them. Of all households, 50.6% were married-couple households, 16.0% were households with a male householder and no spouse or partner present, and 26.7% were households with a female householder and no spouse or partner present. About 27.0% of all households were made up of individuals and 10.5% had someone living alone who was 65 years of age or older.

There were 4,181 housing units, of which 2.8% were vacant. The homeowner vacancy rate was 0.5% and the rental vacancy rate was 3.2%.

Racial composition as of the 2020 census
Race	Number	Percent
White	8,352	76.5%
Black or African American	349	3.2%
American Indian and Alaska Native	32	0.3%
Asian	735	6.7%
Native Hawaiian and Other Pacific Islander	2	0.0%
Some other race	601	5.5%
Two or more races	844	7.7%
Hispanic or Latino (of any race)	1,469	13.5%

=== 2010 census ===
The 2010 United States census counted 10,521 people, 4,001 households, and 2,593 families in the borough. The population density was 1,649.0 per square mile (636.7/km^{2}). There were 4,145 housing units at an average density of 649.7 per square mile (250.9/km^{2}). The racial makeup was 86.26% (9,075) White, 1.83% (193) Black or African American, 0.20% (21) Native American, 7.38% (776) Asian, 0.00% (0) Pacific Islander, 2.26% (238) from other races, and 2.07% (218) from two or more races. Hispanic or Latino of any race were 9.59% (1,009) of the population.

Of the 4,001 households, 26.8% had children under the age of 18; 51.0% were married couples living together; 9.8% had a female householder with no husband present and 35.2% were non-families. Of all households, 28.7% were made up of individuals and 8.3% had someone living alone who was 65 years of age or older. The average household size was 2.46 and the average family size was 3.09.

18.6% of the population were under the age of 18, 6.5% from 18 to 24, 26.4% from 25 to 44, 32.5% from 45 to 64, and 15.9% who were 65 years of age or older. The median age was 44.0 years. For every 100 females, the population had 94.4 males. For every 100 females ages 18 and older there were 91.7 males.

The Census Bureau's 2006–2010 American Community Survey showed that (in 2010 inflation-adjusted dollars) median household income was $87,530 (with a margin of error of +/− $5,142) and the median family income was $98,709 (+/− $5,538). Males had a median income of $71,440 (+/− $4,204) versus $56,761 (+/− $3,088) for females. The per capita income for the borough was $38,807 (+/− $2,824). About 4.3% of families and 4.6% of the population were below the poverty line, including 12.3% of those under age 18 and 1.9% of those age 65 or over.

=== 2000 census ===
As of the 2000 United States census there were 10,930 people, 4,026 households, and 2,705 families residing in the borough. The population density was 1,624.2 inhabitants per square mile (627.1/km^{2}). There were 4,110 housing units at an average density of 610.8 per square mile (235.8/km^{2}). The racial makeup of the borough was 90.07% White, 1.75% African American, 0.12% Native American, 5.29% Asian, 0.01% Pacific Islander, 1.30% from other races, and 1.46% from two or more races. Hispanic or Latino people of any race were 5.79% of the population.

There were 4,026 households, out of which 29.3% had children under the age of 18 living with them, 55.2% were married couples living together, 9.2% had a female householder with no husband present, and 32.8% were non-families. 26.6% of all households were made up of individuals, and 6.9% had someone living alone who was 65 years of age or older. The average household size was 2.54 and the average family size was 3.14.

In the borough, the population was spread out, with 20.3% under the age of 18, 5.8% from 18 to 24, 33.7% from 25 to 44, 25.4% from 45 to 64, and 14.8% who were 65 years of age or older. The median age was 40 years. For every 100 females, there were 92.1 males. For every 100 females age 18 and over, there were 87.8 males.

The median income for a household in the borough was $69,050, and the median income for a family was $77,307. Males had a median income of $51,651 versus $36,292 for females. The per capita income for the borough was $30,389. About 1.9% of families and 2.8% of the population were below the poverty line, including 2.7% of those under age 18 and 5.9% of those age 65 or over.

== Government ==
=== Local government ===
The Borough of Lincoln Park is governed within the Faulkner Act (formally known as the Optional Municipal Charter Law) under the Mayor-Council Plan F system of municipal government, implemented based on the recommendations of a Charter Study Commission as of January 1, 1971. The borough is one of 71 municipalities (of the 564) statewide that use this form of government. The governing body is comprised of the mayor and the seven-member borough council, with three council seats elected at-large and four from wards, with all positions chosen in partisan elections held in even-numbered years as part of the November general election. Each council member is elected to a four-year term on a staggered basis, with the four ward seats up for vote simultaneously and the three at-large seats and the mayoral seat up for election together two years later.

As of 2025, the Mayor of Lincoln Park is Republican David A. Runfeldt, whose term of office ends on December 31, 2026. Members of the Borough Council are Council President Andrew Seise (R; at-large, 2026), Patrick Antonetti (D; Ward 3, 2028), Gary Gemian (R; Ward 1, 2028), Joseph Gurkovich (R, Ward 4, 2028), Daniel W. Moeller (R; at-large, 2026), Ellen Ross (R; Ward 2, 2028) and Ann Thompson (R; at-large, 2026).

=== Federal, state and county representation ===
Lincoln Park is located in the 11th Congressional District and is part of New Jersey's 26th state legislative district.

For the 119th United States Congress, New Jersey's 11th congressional district is represented by Analilia Mejia (D, Glen Ridge) who was elected in a 2026 special election to serve for the remainder of the Congress following the resignation Mikie Sherrill (D, Montclair), who was elected Governor of New Jersey in 2025. New Jersey is represented in the United States Senate by Democrats Cory Booker (Newark, term ends 2027) and Andy Kim (Moorestown, term ends 2031).

For the 2026–2027 session, the 26th legislative district of the New Jersey Legislature is represented in the State Senate by Joseph Pennacchio (R, Rockaway Township) and in the General Assembly by Brian Bergen (R, Denville Township) and Jay Webber (R, Morris Plains).

Morris County is governed by a Board of County Commissioners comprised of seven members who are elected at-large in partisan elections to three-year terms on a staggered basis, with either one or three seats up for election each year as part of the November general election. Actual day-to-day operation of departments is supervised by County Administrator Deena Leary.

As of 2026, Morris County's Commissioners (with all terms ending December 31) are Director Stephen H. Shaw (R, Mountain Lakes, 2027), Deputy Director John Krickus (R, Washington Township, 2027), Douglas Cabana (R, Boonton Township, 2028), Thomas J. Mastrangelo (R, Montville, 2028), Christine Myers (R, Harding Township, 2028), Tayfun Selen (R, Chatham Township, 2026), and Deborah Smith (R, Denville Township, 2027).

The county's constitutional officers are County Clerk Ann F. Grossi (R, Parsippany–Troy Hills, 2028), Sheriff James M. Gannon (R, Boonton Township, 2025) and Surrogate Heather Darling (R, Roxbury, 2029).

=== Politics ===
United States presidential election results for Lincoln Park 2024 2020 2016 2012 2008 2004
Year	Republican		Democratic		Third party(ies)	
Year	No.	%	No.	%	No.	%
2024	3,239	57.47%	2,267	40.22%	130	2.31%
2020	3,240	53.05%	2,784	45.59%	83	1.36%
2016	2,796	54.64%	2,141	41.84%	180	3.52%
2012	2,301	53.42%	1,967	45.67%	39	0.91%
2008	2,745	53.56%	2,311	45.09%	69	1.35%
2004	2,767	57.00%	2,047	42.17%	40	0.82%

As of March 2011, there were a total of 6,421 registered voters in Lincoln Park, of which 1,371 (21.4%) were registered as Democrats, 2,088 (32.5%) were registered as Republicans and 2,955 (46.0%) were registered as Unaffiliated. There were 7 voters registered as Libertarians or Greens.

In the 2012 presidential election, Republican Mitt Romney received 53.4% of the vote (2,301 cast), ahead of Democrat Barack Obama with 45.7% (1,967 votes), and other candidates with 0.9% (39 votes), among the 4,340 ballots cast by the borough's 6,735 registered voters (33 ballots were spoiled), for a turnout of 64.4%. In the 2008 presidential election, Republican John McCain received 53.2% of the vote (2,745 cast), ahead of Democrat Barack Obama with 44.8% (2,311 votes) and other candidates with 1.3% (69 votes), among the 5,162 ballots cast by the borough's 6,711 registered voters, for a turnout of 76.9%. In the 2004 presidential election, Republican George W. Bush received 56.9% of the vote (2,767 ballots cast), outpolling Democrat John Kerry with 42.1% (2,047 votes) and other candidates with 0.6% (40 votes), among the 4,864 ballots cast by the borough's 6,635 registered voters, for a turnout percentage of 73.3.

Gubernatorial election results for Lincoln Park
Year	Republican		Democratic		Third party(ies)	
Year	No.	%	No.	%	No.	%
2025	2,328	53.58%	2,001	46.05%	16	0.37%
2021	2,063	57.32%	1,499	41.65%	37	1.03%
2017	1,378	52.38%	1,198	45.53%	55	2.09%
2013	1,857	67.97%	818	29.94%	57	2.09%
2009	1,762	56.89%	1,081	34.90%	254	8.20%
2005	1,467	51.91%	1,272	45.01%	87	3.08%

In the 2013 gubernatorial election, Republican Chris Christie received 68.0% of the vote (1,857 cast), ahead of Democrat Barbara Buono with 29.9% (818 votes), and other candidates with 2.1% (57 votes), among the 2,783 ballots cast by the borough's 6,632 registered voters (51 ballots were spoiled), for a turnout of 42.0%. In the 2009 gubernatorial election, Republican Chris Christie received 56.7% of the vote (1,762 ballots cast), ahead of Democrat Jon Corzine with 34.8% (1,081 votes), Independent Chris Daggett with 7.3% (226 votes) and other candidates with 0.9% (28 votes), among the 3,108 ballots cast by the borough's 6,518 registered voters, yielding a 47.7% turnout.

United States Senate election results for Lincoln Park1
Year	Republican		Democratic		Third party(ies)	
Year	No.	%	No.	%	No.	%
2024	2,937	56.16%	2,159	41.28%	134	2.56%
2018	2,170	53.99%	1,703	42.37%	146	3.63%
2012	2,003	51.68%	1,826	47.11%	47	1.21%
2006	1,524	55.44%	1,154	41.98%	71	2.58%

United States Senate election results for Lincoln Park2
Year	Republican		Democratic		Third party(ies)	
Year	No.	%	No.	%	No.	%
2020	3,047	52.09%	2,727	46.62%	76	1.30%
2014	1,272	55.79%	975	42.76%	33	1.45%
2013	1,069	57.32%	761	40.80%	35	1.88%
2008	2,436	53.51%	2,031	44.62%	85	1.87%

== Education ==
The Lincoln Park Public Schools serves students in pre-kindergarten through eighth grade. As of the 2023–24 school year, the district, comprised of two schools, had an enrollment of 900 students and 87.7 classroom teachers (on an FTE basis), for a student–teacher ratio of 10.3:1. Schools in the district (with 2023–24 enrollment data from the National Center for Education Statistics) are Lincoln Park Elementary School with 522 students in grades PreK–4 and Lincoln Park Middle School with 366 students in grades 5–8.

For ninth through twelfth grades, Lincoln Park public school students attend Boonton High School in Boonton as part of a sending/receiving relationship with the Boonton Public Schools, with Lincoln Park students accounting for a majority of students at the high school. As of the 2023–24 school year, the high school had an enrollment of 656 students and 59.8 classroom teachers (on an FTE basis), for a student–teacher ratio of 11.0:1. During the 2015–16 school year, there were about 70 students from the borough attending the academy programs of the Morris County Vocational School District, which are the Morris County School of Technology in Denville; The Academy for Mathematics, Science, and Engineering in Rockaway at Morris Hills High School; and the Academy for Law and Public Safety in Butler at Butler High School.

Lincoln Park was formerly the home for The Craig School, a private coeducational day school serving students in second through twelfth grade. The school has an enrollment of 160 students split between the Lower School (grades 3–8), in Mountain Lakes, and the Upper School (grades 9–12), located in Lincoln Park until the end of the 2012–2013 school year. As of September 2013, the Craig School high school program is located at Boonton High School.

== Transportation ==
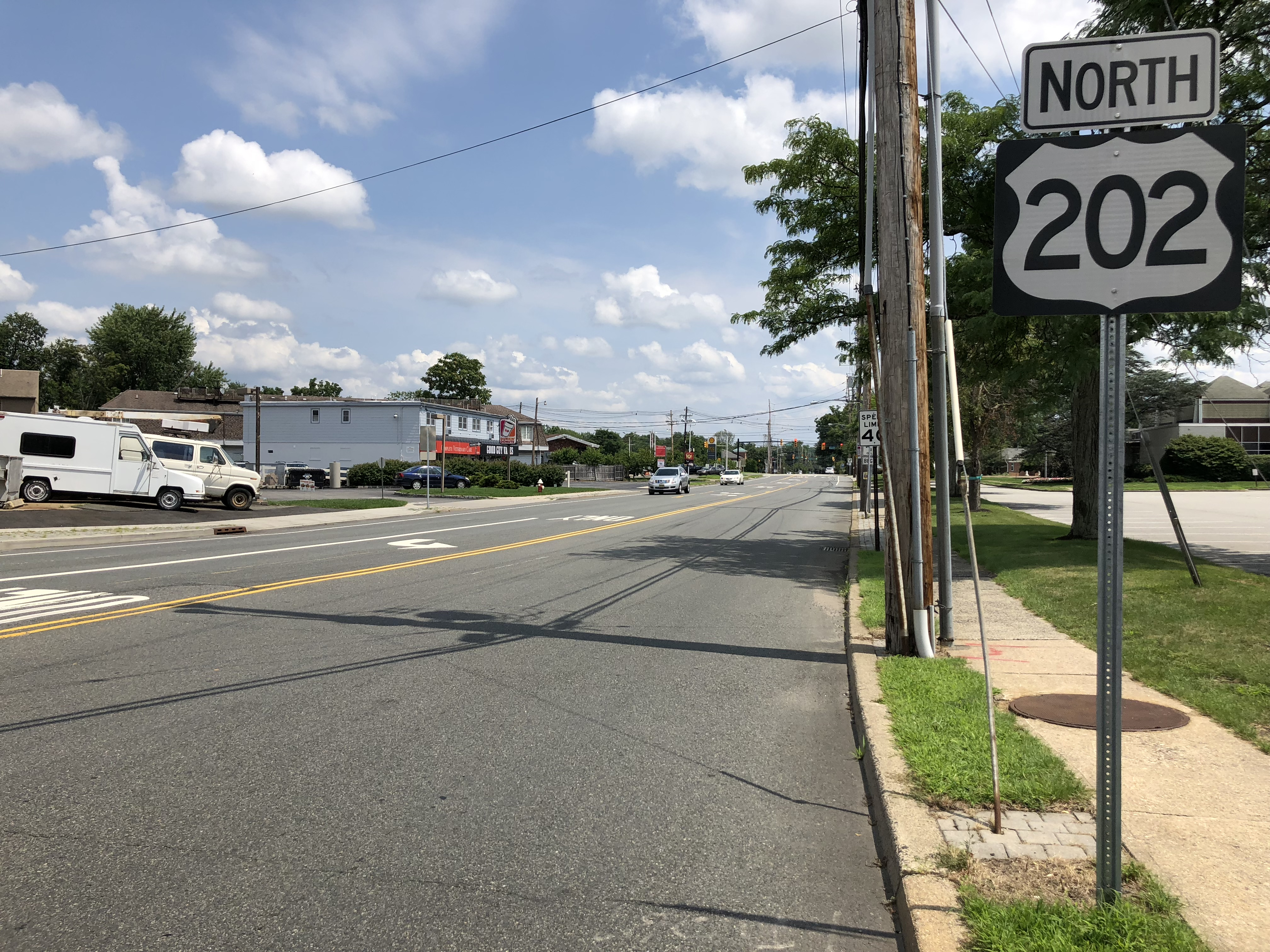
U.S. Route 202 northbound in Lincoln Park

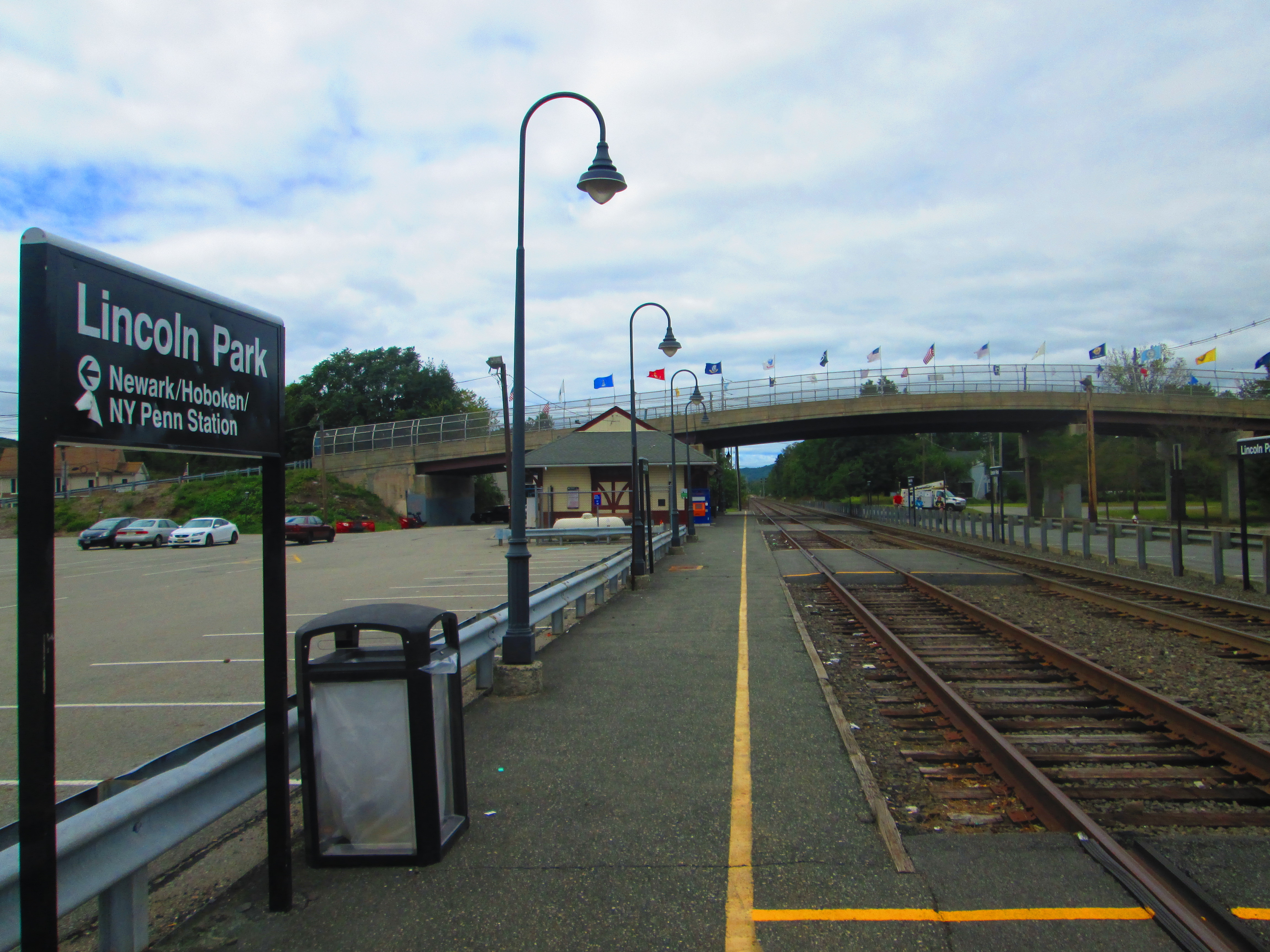
Lincoln Park station on the NJ Transit Montclair-Boonton Line

=== Roads and highways ===
As of May 2010, the borough had a total of 45.16 miles (72.68 km) of roadways, of which 39.40 miles (63.41 km) were maintained by the municipality and 5.76 miles (9.27 km) by Morris County.

The main highway providing service to Lincoln Park is U.S. Route 202. County Route 504 and County Route 511 Alternate also traverse the borough. New Jersey Route 23 and Interstate 80 are major highways accessible in neighboring Wayne Township.

=== Public transportation ===
NJ Transit provides commuter rail service at the Lincoln Park station. Trains are offered on the Montclair-Boonton Line to Newark Broad Street Station and New York Penn Station, with connecting service to Hoboken Terminal.

NJ Transit provides local bus service on the 871 route. NJ Transit had provided service on the MCM1 route until 2010, when subsidies to the local provider were eliminated as part of budget cuts.

Lakeland Bus Lines offers limited service on its Route 46 route between Dover and the Port Authority Bus Terminal in Midtown Manhattan.

== Media ==
Lincoln Park is served by New York City television stations. It is served by the newspapers The Star-Ledger, Daily Record and The Record.

== Notable people ==
People who were born in, residents of, or otherwise closely associated with Lincoln Park include:

- Angelo Badalamenti (1937–2022), film composer/arranger, best known for his theme music for the TV series Twin Peaks
- Walter Bobbie (born 1945), theatre director, choreographer, and occasional actor and dancer, who has directed both musicals and plays on Broadway and Off-Broadway
- Lauren English (born 1989), competitive swimmer who represented the United States at the Pan Pacific Championships (2006) and the World University Games (2007)
- A. J. Khubani (born 1959), founder, president, and CEO of Telebrands Corp.
- Jim Kiick (1946–2020), NFL halfback best known for his play with the Miami Dolphins, helped lead his team to 2 Super Bowl wins before passing in 2020
- Eric Klenofsky (born 1994), soccer player who currently plays for Richmond Kickers of the United Soccer League on loan from D.C. United of Major League Soccer
- Edgar Maass (1896–1964), German-American novelist of historical fiction
- William A. Mitchell (1911–2004), inventor of Pop Rocks and Tang
- James N. Post III, former United States Air Force officer who served as Director of the United States Air Forces Central Command's Air and Space Operations Center
- Craig Slaff (born 1960), artist known for his depiction of themes in aviation
- Amzi Emmons Zeliff (1831–1915), businessman and folk painter
