= John Dods House and Tavern =

- U.S. National Register of Historic Places
- New Jersey Register of Historic Places
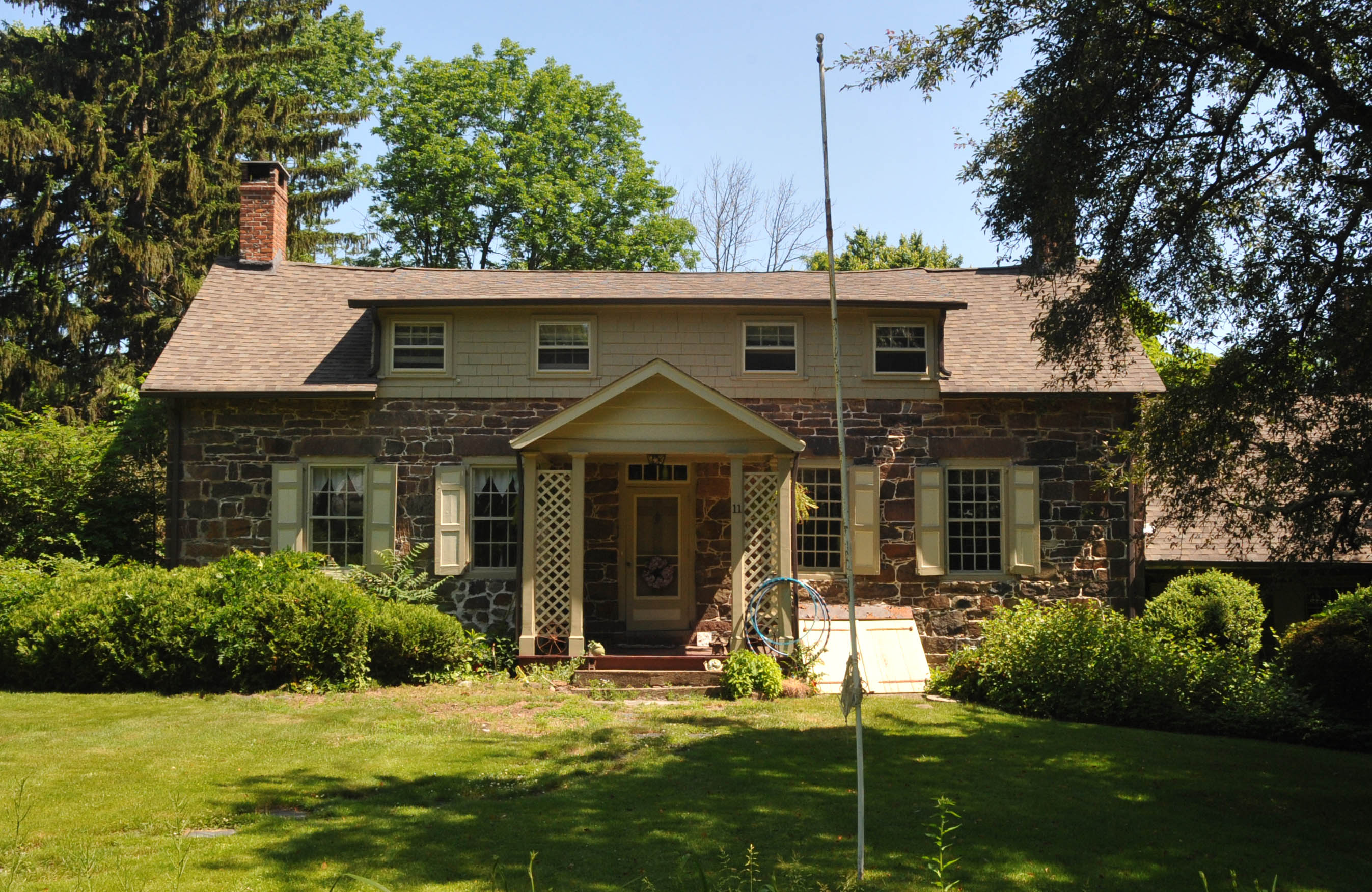
- John Dods House

- Location within Morris County, New Jersey Location within New Jersey Location within the United States
- Location: 11 Highland Street and 8 Chapel Hill Road, Lincoln Park, New Jersey
- Coordinates: 40°55′04″N 74°18′07″W
- NRHP reference No.: 77000895
- NJRHP No.: 2135

Significant dates
- Added to NRHP: August 12, 1977
- Designated NJRHP: April 5, 1976

John Dods House and Tavern are located in the borough of Lincoln Park in Morris County, New Jersey, United States. The house, located at 11 Highland Street, was built in the early 1700s and the tavern, located at 8 Chapel Hill Road, was built around 1770. They were added to the National Register of Historic Places on August 12, 1977, for their significance in social history and transportation.

== History and description ==
The John Dods House was started in the early 1700s, with the main section built in 1770. The historic stone house was documented by the Historic American Buildings Survey (HABS) in 1938.

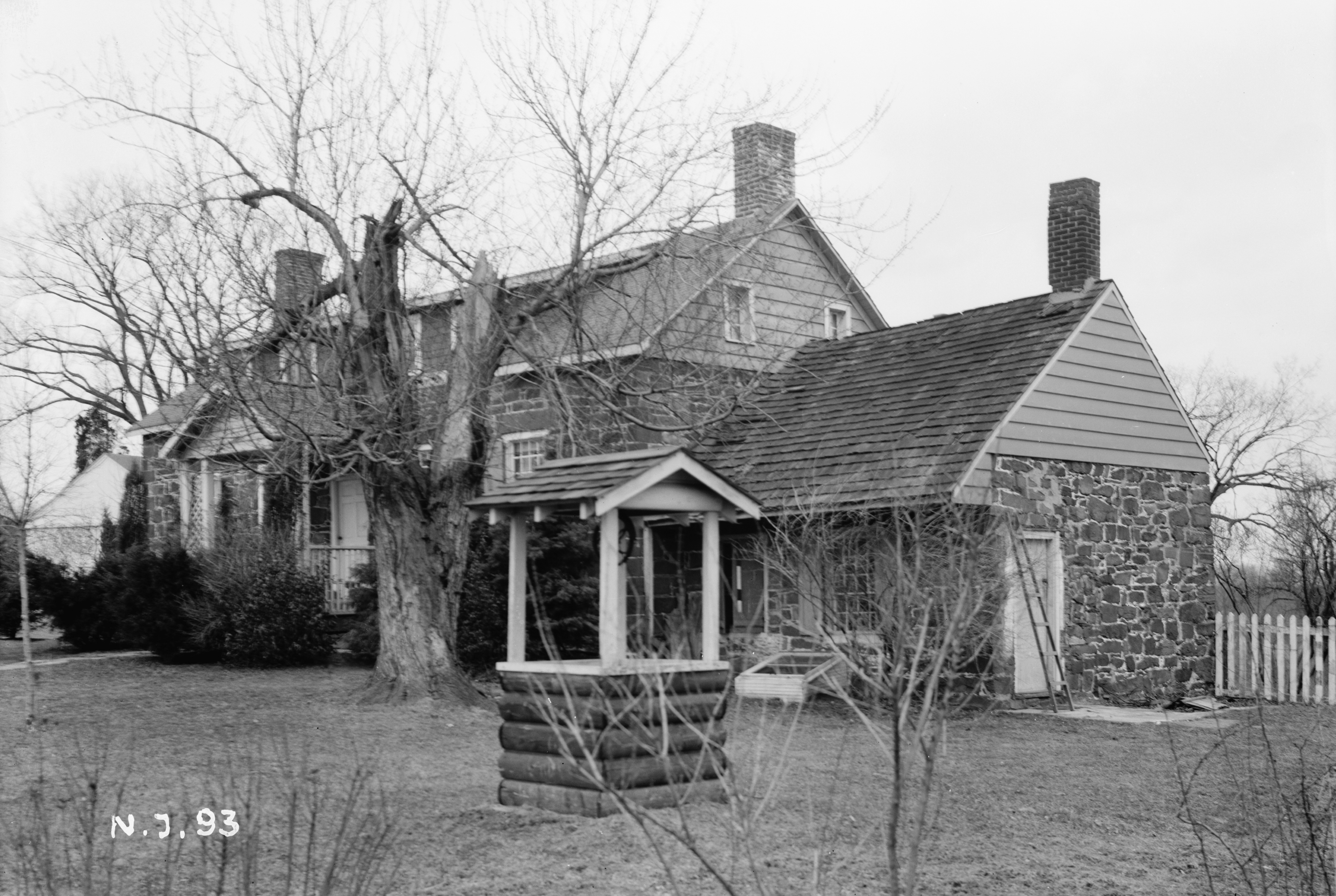
HABS photo from 1938

John Dods Tavern was built around 1770 by John Dods using local fieldstone. During the American Revolutionary War, Colonel Philip Van Cortlandt frequently visited the tavern. The construction of the nearby Morris Canal in the 1830s increased business at the tavern.

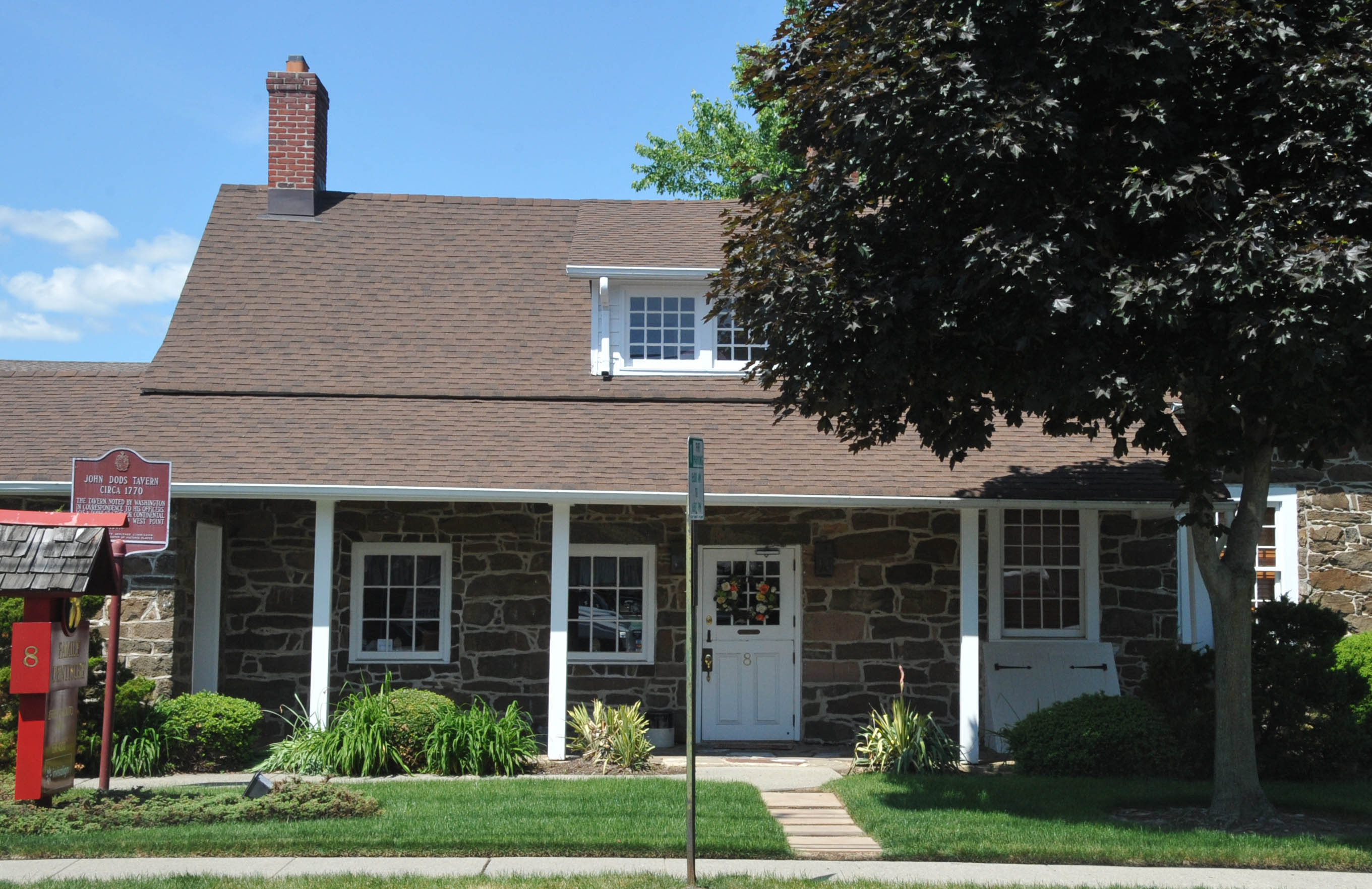
John Dods Tavern

== See also ==
- National Register of Historic Places listings in Morris County, New Jersey
