= Boonton Public Schools =

School district in Morris County, New Jersey, US

Address
- 434 Lathrop Avenue Boonton, Morris County, New Jersey, 07005; United States
- Coordinates: 40.901393°N 74.401667°W

District information
- Grades: PreK-12
- Superintendent: Thomas Valle
- Business administrator: Steven Gardberg
- Schools: 3

Students and staff
- Enrollment: 1,559 (as of 2024–25)
- Faculty: 150.6 FTEs
- Student–teacher ratio: 10.4:1

Other information
- District Factor Group: I
- Website: www.boontonschools.org
| Ind. | Per pupil | District spending | Rank (*) | K-12 average | %± vs. average |
|---|---|---|---|---|---|
| 1A | Total Spending | $22,386 | 42 | $18,891 | 18.5% |
| 1 | Budgetary Cost | 17,777 | 45 | 14,783 | 20.3% |
| 2 | Classroom Instruction | 10,001 | 44 | 8,763 | 14.1% |
| 6 | Support Services | 3,550 | 47 | 2,392 | 48.4% |
| 8 | Administrative Cost | 1,735 | 32 | 1,485 | 16.8% |
| 10 | Operations & Maintenance | 1,696 | 33 | 1,783 | −4.9% |
| 13 | Extracurricular Activities | 795 | 48 | 268 | 196.6% |
| 16 | Median Teacher Salary | 68,083 | 44 | 64,043 |
Data from NJDoE 2014 Taxpayers' Guide to Education Spending. *Of K-12 districts with up to 1,800 students. Lowest spending=1; Highest=49

The Boonton Public Schools is a comprehensive community public school district that serves students in pre-kindergarten through twelfth grade from Boonton, in Morris County, in the U.S. state of New Jersey.

As of the 2024–25 school year, the district, comprised of three schools, had an enrollment of 1,559 students and 150.6 classroom teachers (on an FTE basis), for a student–teacher ratio of 10.4:1.

The district's high school serves students from Boonton and also those from Lincoln Park, who attend as part of a sending/receiving relationship with the Lincoln Park Public Schools, with Lincoln Park students accounting for a majority of students at the high school. The two districts have sought to sever the more-than-50-year-old relationship, citing cost savings that could be achieved by both districts and complaints by Lincoln Park that it is granted only one seat on the Boonton Public Schools' Board of Education, less than the number of seats that would be allocated based on the percentage of students of population. In April 2006, the commissioner of the New Jersey Department of Education rejected the request.

== History ==
Boonton High School formally opened in 1875, with the first class graduating the following year. The first building dedicated for use as a high school was constructed in 1897 at the site that became the location of John Hill School in 1922.

Starting with the 1930–31 school year, students from Lincoln Park were formally assigned by the state to attend Boonton High School, with 62 students being sent there to attend for grades 9–12, before which they could attend the high school of their choice by paying tuition.

Students from Parsippany–Troy Hills had attended the high school as part of a sending/receiving relationship with the Parsippany–Troy Hills School District until Parsippany High School opened for the 1956-57 school year, leaving students at Boonton High School being sent from Boonton Township, Lincoln Park and Montville.

The district had been classified by the New Jersey Department of Education as being in District Factor Group "I", the second-highest of eight groupings. District Factor Groups organize districts statewide to allow comparison by common socioeconomic characteristics of the local districts. From lowest socioeconomic status to highest, the categories are A, B, CD, DE, FG, GH, I and J.

== Schools ==
Schools in the district (with 2024–25 enrollment statistics from the National Center for Education Statistics) are:

Elementary schools

- School Street School with 325 students in grades PreK–2
  - Alison Schessler, principal
- John Hill School with 556 students in grades 3–8
  - Peter Nosal, principal

High school

- Boonton High School with 646 students in grades 9–12
  - Jason Klebez, principal

== Administration ==
Core members of the district's administration are:

- Thomas Valle, superintendent
- Steven Gardberg, business administrator and board secretary

== Board of education ==
The district's board of education is comprised of nine members who set policy and oversee the fiscal and educational operation of the district through its administration; an additional member represents Lincoln Park. As a Type II school district, the board's trustees are elected directly by voters to serve three-year terms of office on a staggered basis, with three seats up for election each year held (since 2012) as part of the November general election. The board appoints a superintendent to oversee the district's day-to-day operations and a business administrator to supervise the business functions of the district.
