= USS Hector A. Cafferata Jr. =

US Navy Lewis B. Puller-class expeditionary sea base

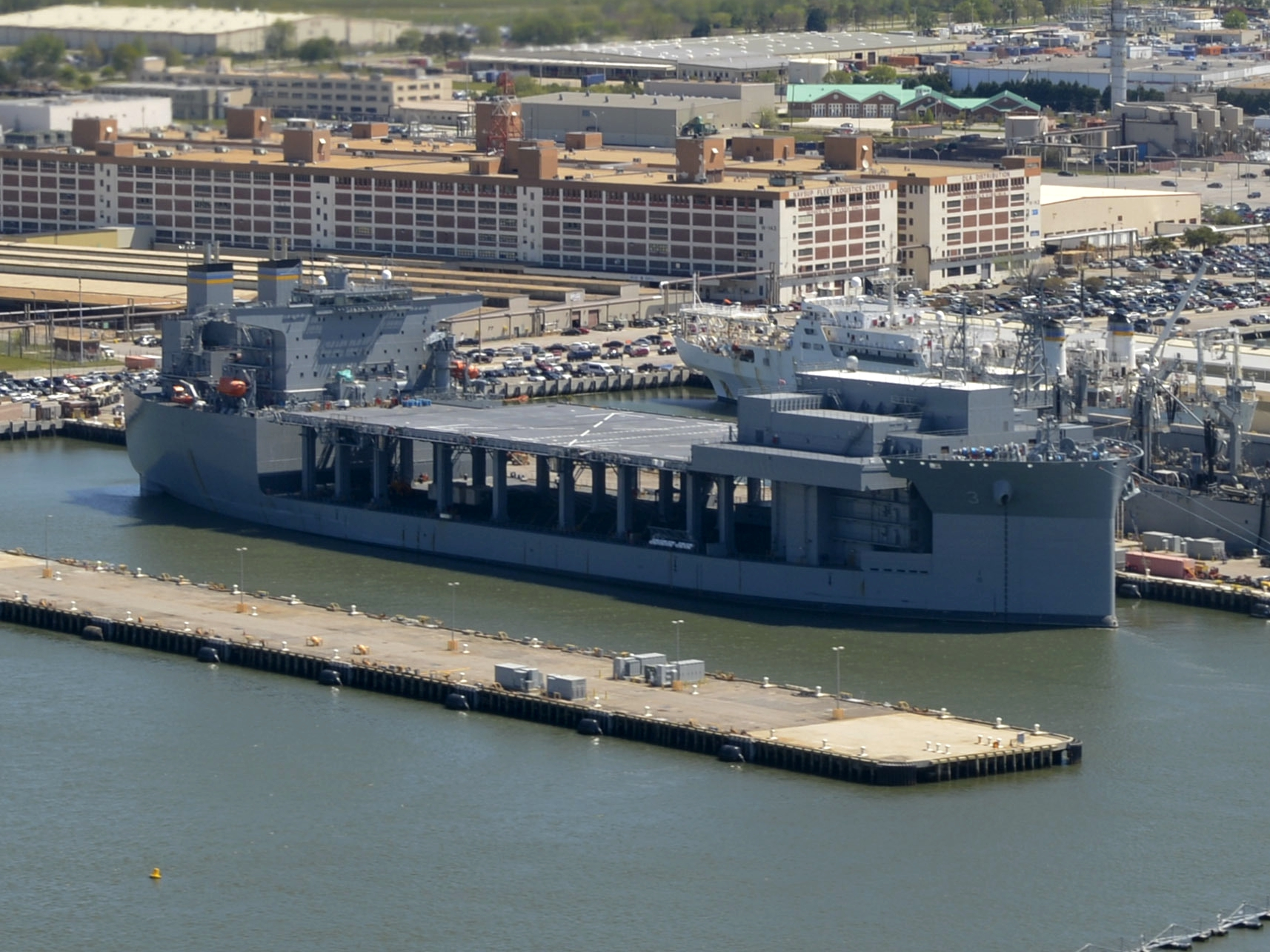
- Lewis B. Puller-class expeditionary sea base

History

United States
- Name: Hector A. Cafferata Jr.
- Namesake: Hector A. Cafferata Jr.
- Ordered: 8 April 2022
- Builder: NASSCO, San Diego
- Laid down: 25 April 2024
- Christened: 7 March 2026
- Identification: Hull number: ESB-8
- Status: Under construction
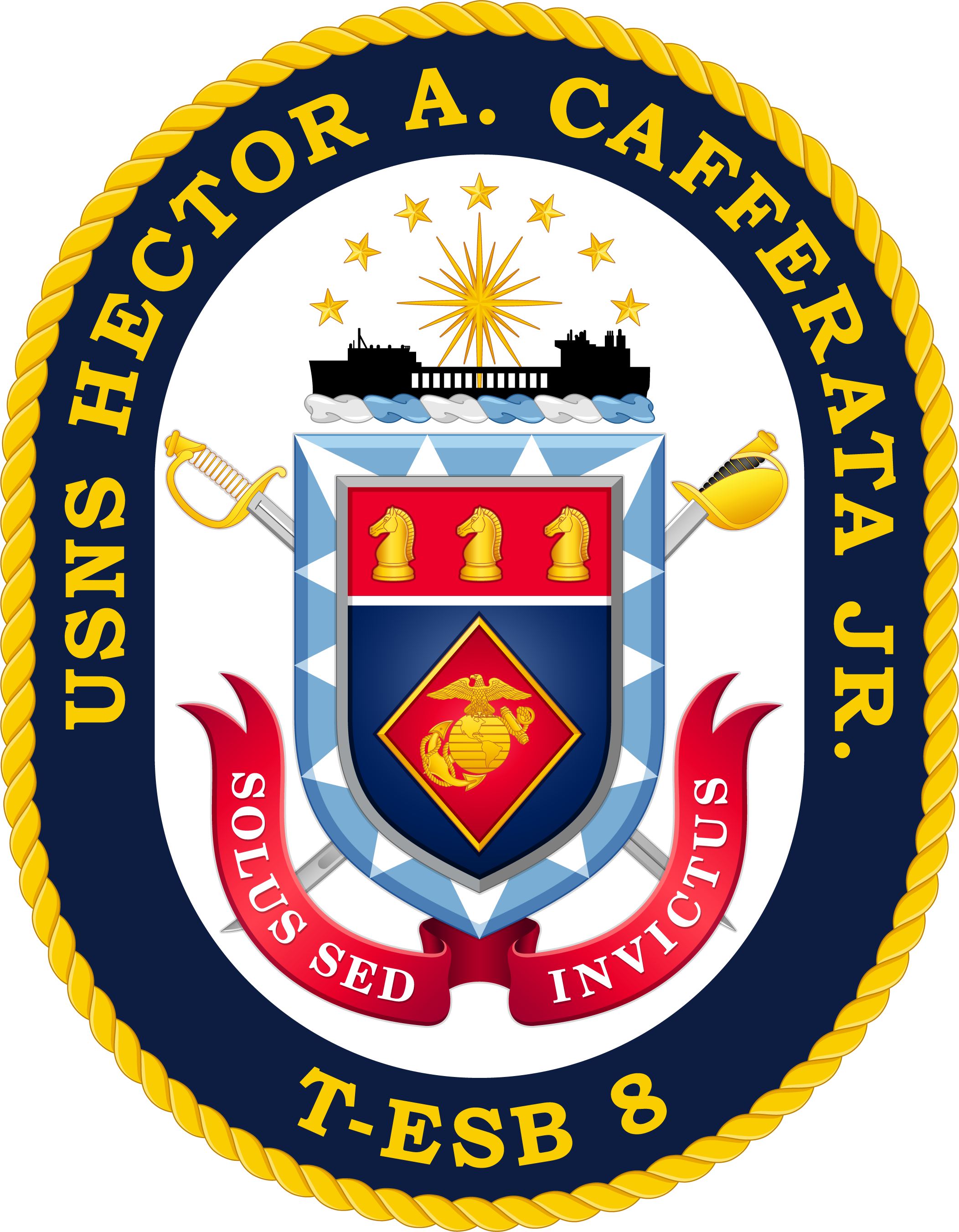
- Badge

General characteristics
- Class & type: Lewis B. Puller-class expeditionary mobile base
- Displacement: Approx. 90,000 long tons (100,000 short tons) fully loaded
- Length: 785 ft (239 m)
- Beam: 164 ft (50 m)
- Draft: 34.4 ft (10.5 m) at full load; 39.4 ft (12.0 m) at load line
- Propulsion: Commercial diesel-electric
- Speed: 15 knots (28 km/h; 17 mph)
- Range: 9,500 nautical miles (17,600 km; 10,900 mi)
- Complement: 34 ship personnel; 250 military (mission dependent)
- Aviation facilities: Four-spot flight deck and hangar

USS Hector A. Cafferata Jr. (ESB-8) will be a Lewis B. Puller-class expeditionary mobile base for the United States Navy, and she is the first United States Navy vessel named after Marine Corps Private First Class Hector A. Cafferata Jr., who was awarded for the Medal of Honor for heroic actions during the Battle of Chosin Reservoir, November 1950, during the Korean War. Her keel was laid on 25 April 2024. Hector A. Cafferata Jr. was christened on 7 March, 2026.
