= Terhune Benjamin House =

Coordinates: 40.9238°N 74.3116°W

- Interactive map of the Terhune Benjamin House area

General information
- Location: 117 Main Street, Lincoln Park, New Jersey, U.S.

The Terhune Benjamin House was a historic farm and a former mill site located in Lincoln Park, New Jersey.

== History ==
Located at 117 Main Street in Lincoln Park, the Terhune Benjamin House was a Federal Period house with a Dutch gambrel roof which predated the American Revolutionary War. Records from the Preakness Reformed Church show that the home passed in ownership from owner Albert Terhune to the Morris Canal Company sometime after 1820.

In 1829, the Morris Canal Company constructed inclined planes at Bloomfield, Pompton, Montville, and Booneton. By 1845, the Morris Canal Company had sold the home and adjacent lands to David Benjamin. Benjamin operated a sawmill at the site, using the 56-foot fall of water at the adjacent Morris Canal incline plane 10 East. Prior to 1901, Thomas Sindle and George Francisco purchased the home.

In 2018, the house was demolished to make way for a new housing development at the site.
