= Edgar Maass =

German-American novelist (1896–1964)

- Born: October 4, 1896; Hamburg, Germany
- Died: January 6, 1964 (aged 67); Paterson, New Jersey, U.S.
- Occupation: Writer (novelist)
- Spouse: Mae Brown
- Children: 2
- Writing career
- Period: 20th century
- Genres: History, fiction

Edgar W. A. Maass (October 4, 1896 – January 6, 1964) was a German-American novelist of historical fiction.

== Biography ==
Maass was the son of the merchant Wilhelm Maass and his wife Martha Anna Moje. His younger brothers Waldemar and Joachim were also noted writers. After graduation and participation in the First World War, he studied medicine at the University of Rostock and graduated in 1921 with a doctorate on the treatment of gonorrhea. He also studied chemistry at the Technical Universities of Hanover and Munich and completed his education in 1924.

He worked as a research chemist in Germany before moving to the United States in 1926. He became a citizen in 1933. He began his literary career in the mid-1930s. One of his first novels entitled Verdun was inspired by his experiences in the war. Edwin Zeydel described Verdun as "one of the finest German war novels, thoroughly human without false heroism or sham."

He collaborated with a group of writers, which included Martin Beheim-Schwarzbach, Friedo Lampe and Wilhelm Emanuel Süskind, who met in the Berlin home of the Jewish doctor and patron Lothar Luft.

In the following years, he wrote novels with historical-biographical themes such as The Great Fire (1939) on the Hamburg fire of May 1842, and Imperial Venus, about Napoleon's sister, Josephine. The Queen's Physician, about Johann Friedrich Struensee in the Danish court of Christian III, was a Book of the Month Club selection in 1949. His works have been translated into several languages such as Danish, English, Italian, Dutch, Spanish and Czech.

A resident of Lincoln Park, New Jersey, Maass died at St. Joseph's Hospital in Paterson, New Jersey at age 67 on January 6, 1964.

== Works ==
- November Battle (1935)
- The Order (1936)
- Verdun (1936)
- Despair (1937)
- In the Mist of Time (1938)
- Lessing (1938)
- The Great Fire (1939)
- The Queen's Physician (1948)
- Imperial Venus (1952)
- A Lady at Bay (1953)
- The Dream of Philip the Second (1954)
- Don Pedro And The Devil (1954)
- The Case of Daubray (1957)
- A Lady Of Rank (1965)
