= Hector A. Cafferata Jr. =

United States marine (1929–2016)

Hector Albert Cafferata Jr.
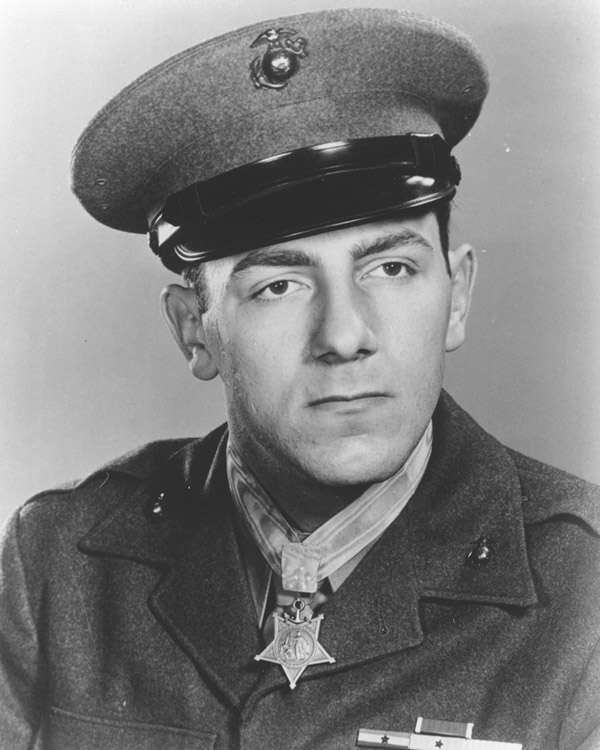
- Cafferata in c. 1952
- Born: November 4, 1929; New York, New York
- Died: April 12, 2016 (aged 86); Venice, Florida
- Burial place: Quantico National Cemetery
- Military career
- Allegiance: United States
- Branch: United States Marine Corps
- Service years: 1948–1951
- Rank: Private First Class
- Units: Fox Company, 2nd Battalion 7th Marines
- Conflicts: Korean War; Battle of Chosin Reservoir
- Awards: Medal of Honor; Purple Heart Medal; Taegeuk Order of Military Merit (South Korea)

Hector Albert Cafferata Jr. (November 4, 1929 – April 12, 2016) was a United States Marine who received the Medal of Honor for his actions at the Battle of Chosin Reservoir during the Korean War. In November 1950, Private First Class Cafferata single-handedly held off a regimental-strength enemy and saved wounded Marines by hurling away a live grenade that had landed in their midst, at the cost of serious personal injury.

== Early life ==
Hector Cafferata was born on November 4, 1929, in New York City to Héctor A. Cafferata-Miller, a Peruvian migrant, born in Chacas; and Helen Signey of Montville, New Jersey. His great-grandfather Pedro Cafferata-Battilana was consul of Italy in Huaraz between 1890 and 1900.

Cafferata grew up in the Lake Hiawatha section of Parsippany-Troy Hills, New Jersey and in nearby Montville, and graduated in 1949 from Boonton High School at Boonton, New Jersey. Starting as a sophomore in high school, he played football for three years, and following graduation, he continued as a semi-pro. In 1943, he was employed by the Sun Dial Corporation of Caldwell, New Jersey.

== Korean War ==
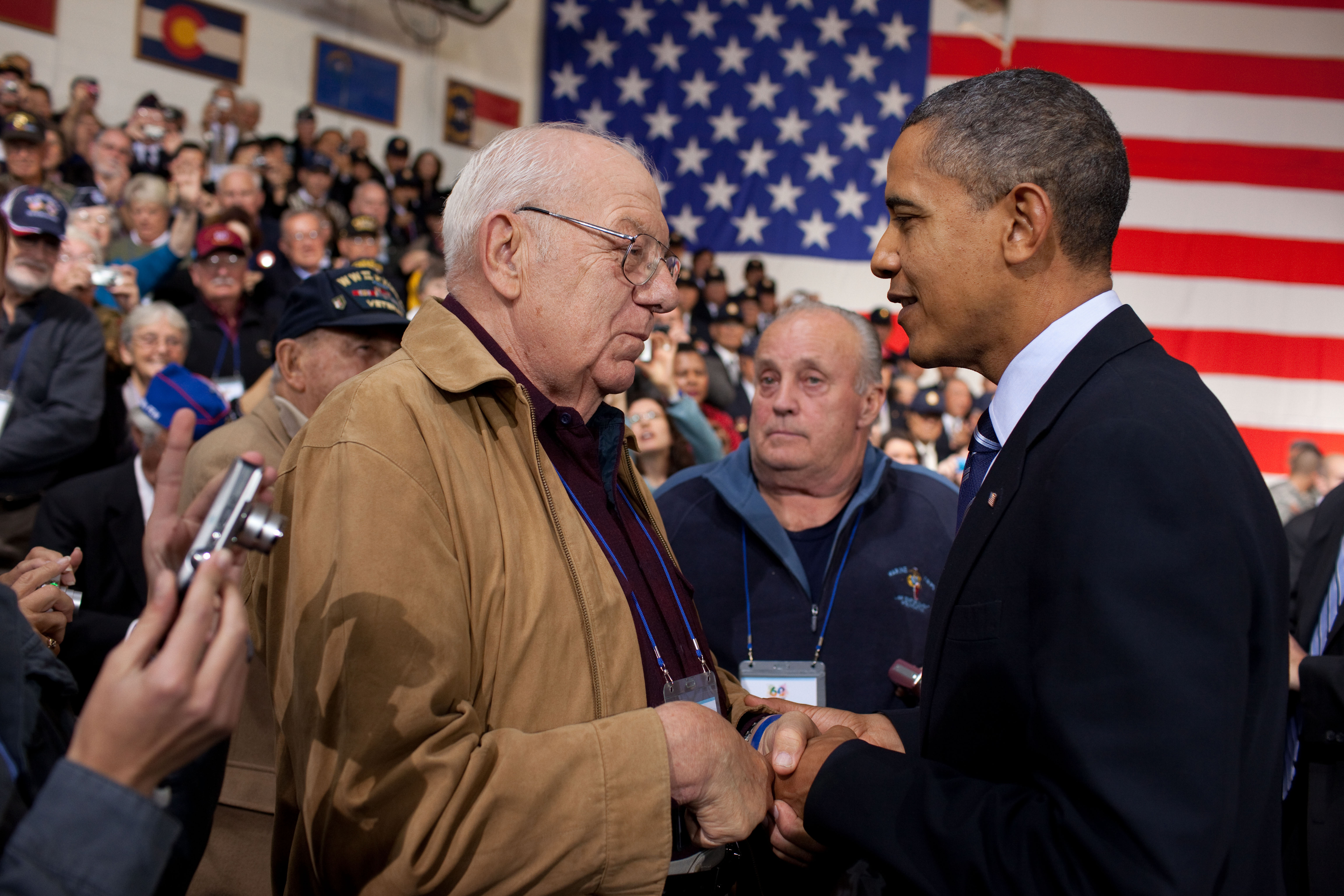
Cafferata shaking hands with President Barack Obama.

Cafferata enlisted in the Marine Corps Reserve on February 15, 1948. He was a member of the 21st Reserve Infantry Battalion at Dover, New Jersey, until he was called to active duty on September 6, 1950. After additional training at Camp Pendleton, California, Private First Class Cafferata embarked for Korea in October 1950, joining the 2nd Battalion, 7th Marines, 1st Marine Division.

=== Medal of Honor actions ===
Cafferata distinguished himself during the Battle of Chosin Reservoir, single-handedly holding off a regimental-sized enemy force and "annihilating two enemy platoons" after nearly all of his fire team had been killed or seriously wounded. Only he and fellow Marine Kenneth Benson were left able to resist, and Benson was temporarily blinded after a grenade went off near his face. Benson kept reloading Cafferata's M-1 rifle for him, while Cafferata, a crack shot, fought the enemy without either his coat or his boots, neither of which he could locate in the early morning darkness. The fight started in the early morning and lasted over five hours.

For the rest of the night I was batting hand grenades away with my entrenching tool while firing my rifle at them. I must have whacked a dozen grenades that night with my tool. And you know what? I was the world's worst baseball player.

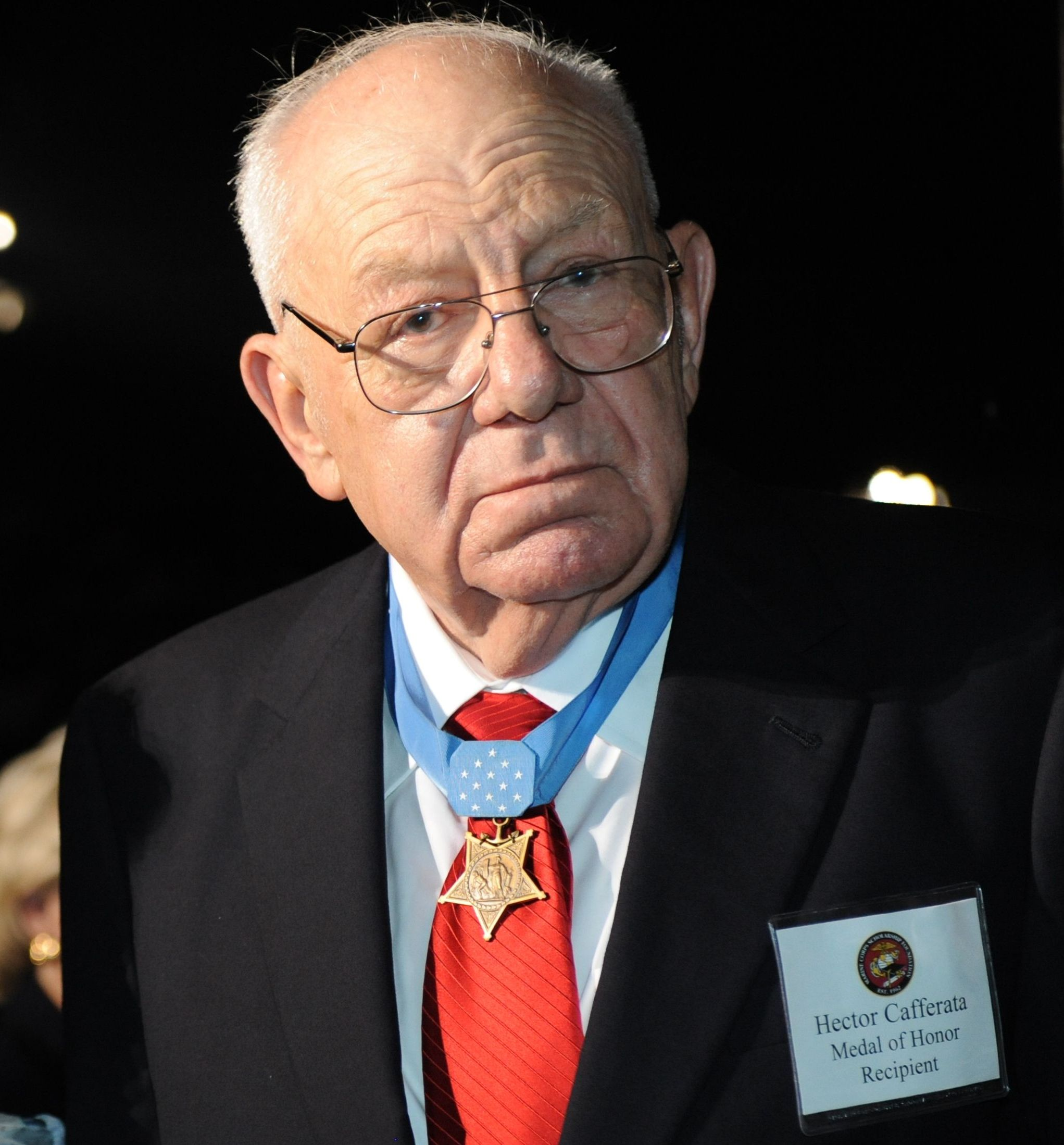
Cafferata at a reception at Marine Barracks Washington on July 23, 2010

When a live grenade fell into the shallow entrenchment occupied by his wounded fellow Marines, he grabbed it and hurled it away — saving the lives of many, but suffering severe wounds. Finally, he was seriously wounded by a sniper, but was rescued by other Marines.

He was evacuated to Japan in December 1950. Cafferata returned to the United States in January for treatment at the U. S. Naval Hospital, St. Albans, New York. He was placed on the medically retired list on September 1, 1951.

On November 24, 1952, Cafferata received the Medal of Honor from President Harry Truman during ceremonies at the White House. His citation reads:

The President of the United States in the name of The Congress takes pride in presenting the MEDAL OF HONOR to

PRIVATE HECTOR A. CAFFERATA Jr.
UNITED STATES MARINE CORPS RESERVE

for service as set forth in the following

CITATION:

For conspicuous gallantry and intrepidity at the risk of his life above and beyond the call of duty while serving as a Rifleman with Company F, Second Battalion, Seventh Marines, First Marine Division (Reinforced), in action against enemy aggressor forces in Korea on 28 November 1950. When all the other members of his fire team became casualties, creating a gap in the lines, during the initial phase of a vicious attack launched by a fanatical enemy of regimental strength against his company's hill position, Private CAFFERATA waged a lone battle with grenades and rifle fire as the attack gained momentum and the enemy threatened penetration through the gap and endangered the integrity of the entire defensive perimeter. Making a target of himself under the devastating fire from automatic weapons, rifles, grenades and mortars, he maneuvered up and down the line and delivered accurate and effective fire against the onrushing force, killing fifteen, wounding many more and forcing the others to withdraw so that reinforcements could move up and consolidate the position. Again fighting desperately against a renewed onslaught later that same morning when a hostile grenade landed in a shallow entrenchment occupied by wounded Marines, Private CAFFERATA rushed into the gully under heavy fire, seized the deadly missile in his right hand and hurled it free of his comrades before it detonated, severing part of one finger and seriously wounding him in the right hand and arm. Courageously ignoring the intense pain, he staunchly fought on until he was struck by a sniper's bullet and forced to submit to evacuation for medical treatment. Stouthearted and indomitable, Private CAFFERATA, by his fortitude, great personal valor and dauntless perseverance in the face of almost certain death, saved the lives of several of his fellow Marines and contributed essentially to the success achieved by his company in maintaining its defensive position against tremendous odds. His extraordinary heroism throughout was in keeping with the highest traditions of the United States Naval Service.

/S/ HARRY S. TRUMAN

== Post-war life and death ==
After the war, Cafferata sold hunting and fishing equipment, worked for the New Jersey Division of Fish and Wildlife, and ran the Cliffside Tavern in Alpha, New Jersey, where he was a longtime resident.

He petitioned to have Kenneth Benson (c. 1932–2012) also awarded the Medal of Honor. In 2000, Benson was awarded the Silver Star.

Cafferata died on April 12, 2016, at a hospice in Venice, Florida. He was survived by his wife of more than 50 years, the former Doris Giblock of Venice, four children (Lynn D. Cafferata Coovert and Deborah Cafferata-ReFalo, both of Charlotte, North Carolina; Dale W. Cafferata of Pinellas Park, Florida, and Heather A. Cafferata of Budd Lake, New Jersey), a brother, six grandchildren and three great-grandchildren.

Although Cafferata occasionally attended Medal of Honor ceremonies, he was reluctant to speak about his own wartime experiences.

I did my duty. I protected my fellow Marines. They protected me. And I'm prouder of that than the fact that the government decided to give me the Medal of Honor.

== Military decorations and awards ==
Cafferata's military awards include:

1st row	Medal of Honor	Purple Heart	Combat Action Ribbon Retroactively Awarded, 1999
2nd row	Navy Presidential Unit Citation with 1 Service star	National Defense Service Medal	Korean Service Medal with 1 Campaign star
3rd row	Korean Presidential Unit Citation	United Nations Service Medal Korea	Korean War Service Medal Retroactively Awarded, 2003

== Other honors ==
Marine Hector Cafferata Jr. Medal of Honor Highway, a section of Interstate 287 from milepost 30.17 to milepost 53.89, is named in his honor, as is Hector A. Cafferata Jr. Elementary School in Cape Coral, Florida, the first school in Florida to be named after a living Medal of Honor recipient.

In 2014, the United States Post Office issued a two-stamp set honoring Korean War Medal of Honor recipients. The two stamps show different versions of the Medal of Honor. The cover of the folio displays photographs of the 13 of the last surviving recipients around the stamps, Cafferata in the upper left.

In 2023, the Secretary of the Navy announced that a new Lewis B. Puller-class expeditionary mobile base would be named USS Hector A. Cafferata Jr. in his honor.

== See also ==
- List of Korean War Medal of Honor recipients
