= Boonton High School =

High school in Morris County, New Jersey, US

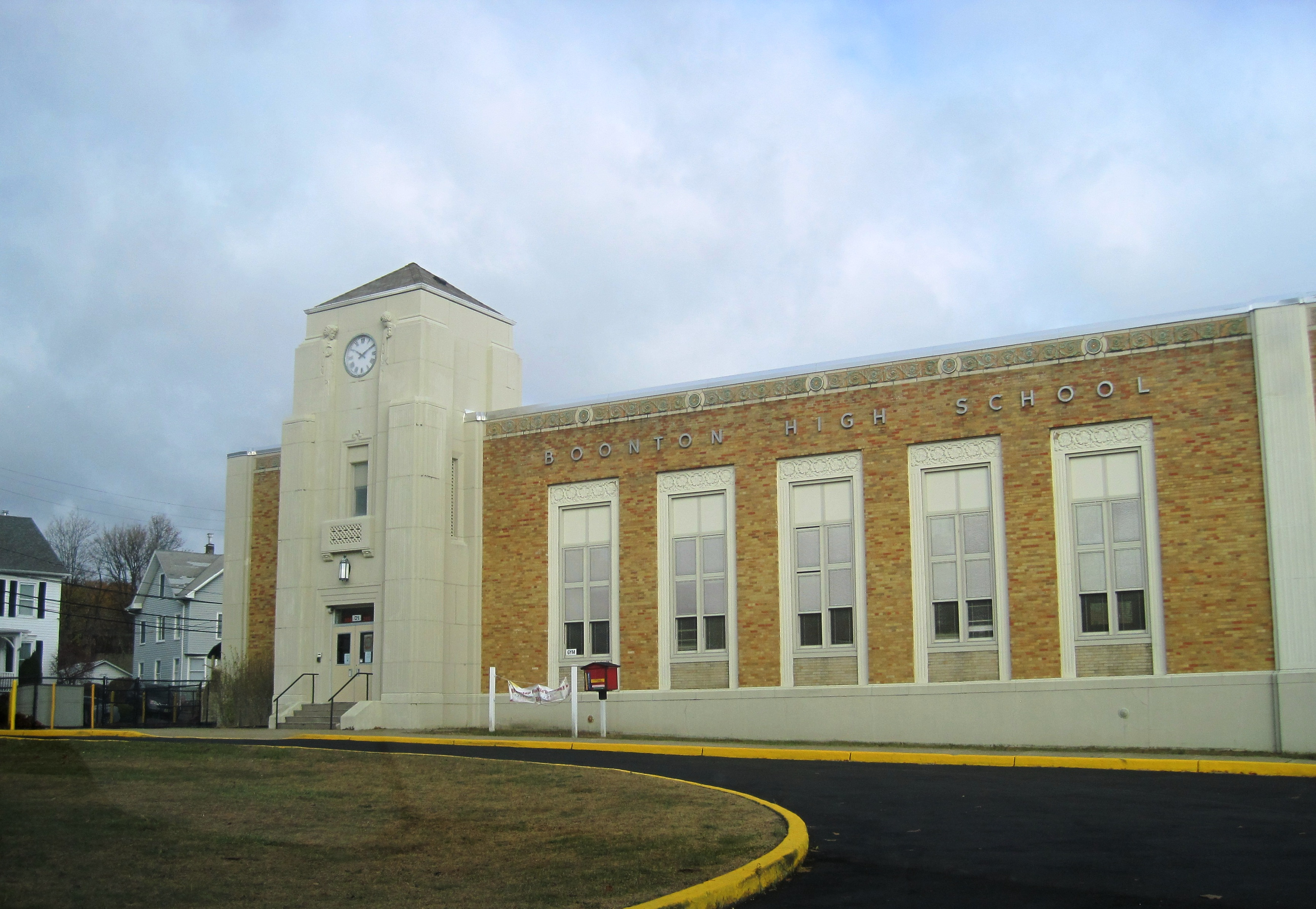

Location
- 306 Lathrop Avenue; Boonton, Morris County, New Jersey 07005; United States; 40.902137°N 74.405216°W

Information
- Type: Public high school
- Motto: A World Class Education for Tomorrow's Leaders
- Established: 1875
- School district: Boonton Public Schools
- NCES School ID: 340195004154
- Principal: Jason Klebez
- Faculty: 62.1 FTEs
- Grades: 9-12
- Enrollment: 646 (as of 2024–25)
- Student to teacher ratio: 10.4:1
- Colors: Black; Red
- Athletics conference: Northwest Jersey Athletic Conference (general); North Jersey Super Football Conference (football)
- Team name: Bombers
- Accreditation: Middle States Association of Colleges and Schools
- Newspaper: Wampus
- Website: www.boontonschools.org/o/bhs

Boonton High School is a comprehensive four-year public high school that serves students in ninth through twelfth grades from Boonton, in Morris County, in the U.S. state of New Jersey, operating as part of the Boonton Public Schools. The school is accredited by the Middle States Association of Colleges and Schools Commission on Elementary and Secondary Schools until July 2029 and has been accredited since 1928.

As of the 2024–25 school year, the school had an enrollment of 646 students and 62.1 classroom teachers (on an FTE basis), for a student–teacher ratio of 10.4:1. There were 177 students (27.4% of enrollment) eligible for free lunch and 33 (5.1% of students) eligible for reduced-cost lunch.

The high school serves students from Boonton and approximately 300 students from Lincoln Park, who attend as part of a sending/receiving relationship with the Lincoln Park Public Schools. The two districts had sought to sever the more-than-50-year-old relationship, citing cost savings that could be achieved by both districts and complaints by Lincoln Park that it is granted only one seat on the Boonton Public Schools' Board of Education. In April 2006, the Commissioner of the New Jersey Department of Education rejected the request.

== History ==
The school formally opened in 1875, with the first class graduating the following year. The first building dedicated for use as a high school was constructed in 1897 at the site that became the location of John Hill School in 1922.

Starting with the 1930–31 school year, students from Lincoln Park were formally assigned by the state to attend Boonton High School, with 62 students being sent there to attend for grades 9–12, before which they could attend the high school of their choice by paying tuition.

Students from Parsippany–Troy Hills had attended the high school as part of a sending/receiving relationship with the Parsippany–Troy Hills School District until Parsippany High School opened for the 1956-57 school year, leaving students attending from Boonton Township, Lincoln Park and Montville.

The relationship with Montville ended starting in 1968, with the opening of Montville Township High School for freshmen, a process that was completed in 191. Boonton Township left in 1992 after establishing a sending/receiving relationship with Mountain Lakes.

== Awards, recognition and rankings ==
The school was the 212th-ranked public high school in New Jersey out of 339 schools statewide in New Jersey Monthly magazine's September 2014 cover story on the state's "Top Public High Schools", using a new ranking methodology. The school had been ranked 109th in the state of 328 schools in 2012, after being ranked 130th in 2010 out of 322 schools listed. The magazine ranked the school 112th in 2008 out of 316 schools. The school was ranked 128th in the magazine's September 2006 issue, which surveyed 316 schools across the state.

Schooldigger.com ranked the school as 259th out of 376 public high schools statewide in its 2010 rankings (a decrease of 15 positions from the 2009 rank) which were based on the combined percentage of students classified as proficient or above proficient on the language arts literacy and mathematics components of the High School Proficiency Assessment (HSPA).

== Athletics ==
The Boonton High School Bombers compete in the Northwest Jersey Athletic Conference (NJAC), which includes 39 public and private high schools in Morris and Sussex counties, following a reorganization of sports leagues in Northern New Jersey by the New Jersey State Interscholastic Athletic Association (NJSIAA). Before the 2010 realignment, the school had competed in the Colonial Hills Conference, which includes public and private high schools in Essex, Morris and Somerset counties. With 459 students in grades 10-12, the school was classified by the NJSIAA for the 2019–20 school year as Group I for most athletic competition purposes, which included schools with an enrollment of 75 to 476 students in that grade range. The football team competes in the National Blue division of the North Jersey Super Football Conference, which includes 112 schools competing in 20 divisions, making it the nation's biggest football-only high school sports league. The school was classified by the NJSIAA as Group I North for football for 2024–2026, which included schools with 254 to 474 students.

The school participates in a joint ice hockey team with Mountain Lakes High School as the host school / lead agency. The co-op program operates under agreements scheduled to expire at the end of the 2023–24 school year.

The boys' lacrosse team won the 1976 state title by defeating Montclair High School by a score of 8–5 in the championship game, after losing to Montclair in the state finals in both 1974 (by a score of 9–2) and 1975 (by 10–3). The 1998 team won the state championship with an 8-5 win against Montclair High School in the championship game.

The field hockey team won the North II Group II state sectional championships in 1987, 1988, 1991, 1992, 1994, North II Group I in 1998, North I Group I in 2004. The team was the runner-up for the Group II state championship in 1991 and 1992, and for the Group I title in 1998.

The football team won the NJSIAA North I Group I state sectional championship in 2003 and 2019. The team finished with a season record of 11–1 in 2003 after winning the North I Group I state title with a 14–7 win against Butler High School in the championship game with 2,000 spectators at Henry P. Becton Regional High School. The team won the North I Group I title in 2019 with a 34–21 win against Cedar Grove High School.

The boys basketball team won NJSIAA sectional titles in 1995 (North II, Group II) and 2005 (North I, Group I). The 1995 team was the runner up in the Group II finals.

The boys track team won the spring / outdoor track state championship in Group I in 2017.

The Mountain Lakes-Boonton co-op ice hockey team won the Haas Cup in 2020.

The girls basketball team won the NJSIAA North I Group I sectional tournament in 2023, defeating Park Ridge High School by 42-28 in the tournament final, to win the program's first sectional title since 1990.

== Administration ==
The school's principal is Jason Klebez. His core administration team includes two vice principals and the athletic director.

== Notable alumni ==
Notable alumni of Boonton High School include:

- Amanda Bennett (born 1952, class of 1970), Pulitzer Prize-winner, formerly of The Wall Street Journal, now with Bloomberg News
- Walter Bobbie (born 1945, class of 1963), theatre director, choreographer, and occasional actor and dancer, who has directed both musicals and plays on Broadway and Off-Broadway
- Anthony M. Bucco (born 1962), member of the New Jersey General Assembly who served together with his father, Anthony R. Bucco, in the New Jersey Legislature since taking office in 2010
- Hector A. Cafferata Jr. (1929–2016, class of 1949), United States Marine awarded the Medal of Honor for his heroic service at the Battle of Chosin Reservoir during the Korean War
- Frederick Walker Castle (1908–1944, class of 1925), general officer in the United States Army Air Forces during World War II, and a recipient of the Medal of Honor
- Herbert Dargue (1886–1941, class of 1905), aviation pioneer and major general in the Army Air Forces, who was one of the first ten recipients of the Distinguished Flying Cross
- Alex DeCroce (1936–2012, class of 1954), politician who served in the New Jersey General Assembly, where he represented the 26th Legislative District from 1989 until his death
- Mario DeMarco (1924–1956, class of 1945), former professional football player
- Dean Gallo (1935–1994, class of 1954), politician who was a member of the United States House of Representatives, representing New Jersey's 11th congressional district from 1985 until his death
- Hurd Hatfield (1917–1998, class of 1937), actor who played the title role in the 1945 film The Picture of Dorian Gray
- Andrew D. Hurwitz (born 1947), United States circuit judge of the United States Court of Appeals for the Ninth Circuit
- Ashish Jha (born 1970, class of 1988), general internist physician and academic serving as Dean of the Brown University School of Public Health
- A. J. Khubani (born 1959), founder, president and CEO of Telebrands Corp.
- Jim Kiick (1946–2020), former NFL halfback best known for playing with the Miami Dolphins
- Jim Lewis (born 1955), writer for the Muppets, Disney and Hollywood
- Frank Makosky (1910–1987, class of 1930), Major League Baseball pitcher who played for the New York Yankees
- Joseph J. Maraziti (1912–1991, class of 1931), U.S. representative, member of the New Jersey General Assembly and member of the New Jersey Senate, lawyer and judge
- Mike Michalowicz (born 1970), business author, Wall Street Journal columnist and television host
- Peter Onorati (born 1953, class of 1971), actor
- James N. Post III (class of 1978), former United States Air Force officer who served as Director of the United States Air Forces Central Command's Air and Space Operations Center
- Jeffrey L. Seglin (born 1956), newspaper columnist and faculty member at John F. Kennedy School of Government at Harvard University
- Walter D. Van Riper (1895–1973, class of 1912), Attorney General of New Jersey from 1944 to 1948
- James P. Vreeland (1910-2001, class of 1927), politician who served four terms in the New Jersey Senate after a term in the New Jersey General Assembly

== Notable faculty ==
- Charlie Weis (born 1956), University of Notre Dame football coach was an assistant football coach at Boonton High School in 1979.
