= Amzi Emmons Zeliff =

American painter

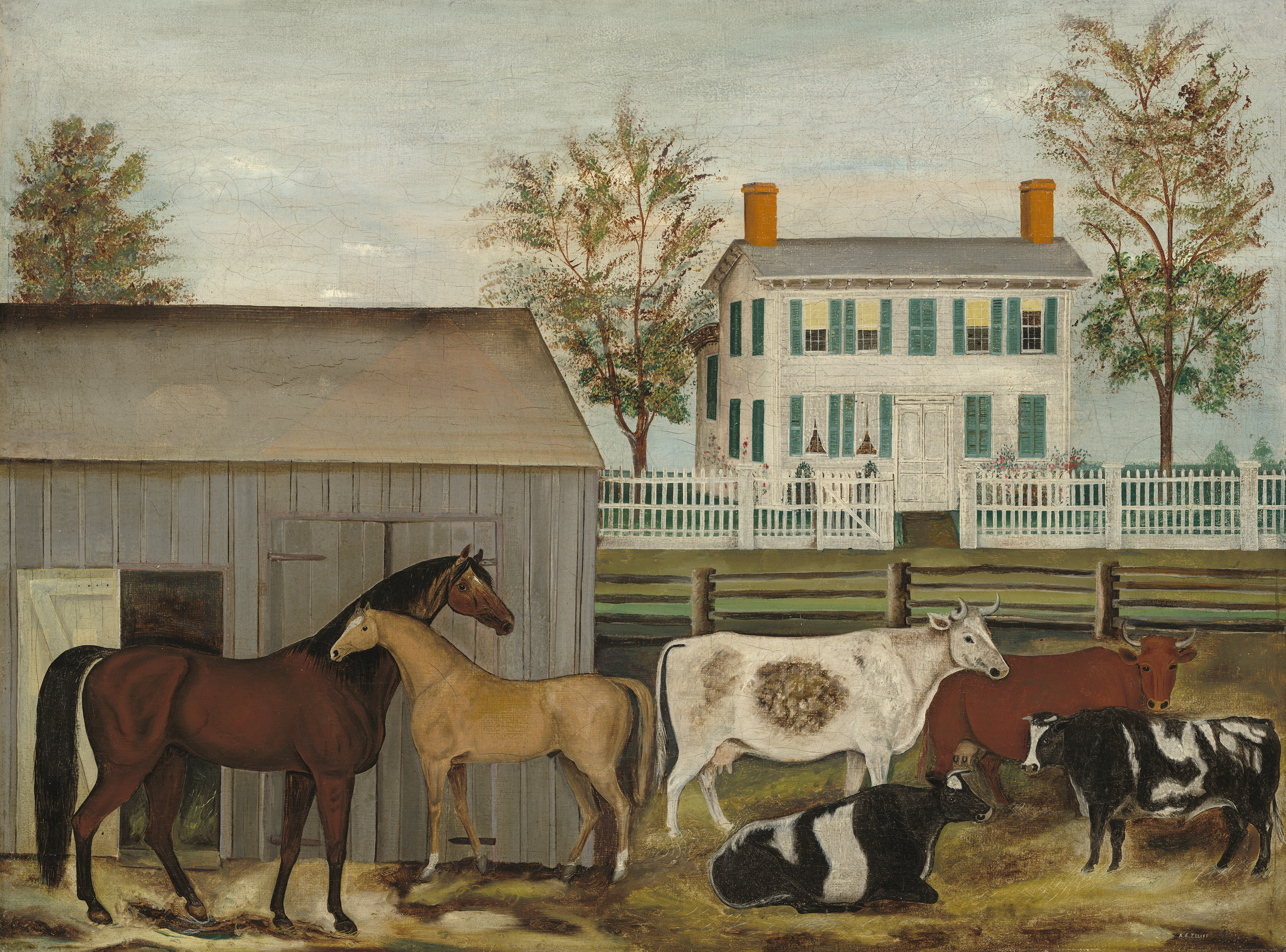
The Barnyard by Amzi Emmons Zeliff, in the collection of the National Gallery of Art

Amzi Emmons Zeliff (April 11, 1831 – September 13, 1915) was an American businessman and folk painter.

Little about Zeliff's life is recorded; most of what is known comes from recollections of family members. He was a native of Morris County, New Jersey, the son of Daniel P. and Maria Van Houton Zeliff, and was descended from early Dutch settlers of the state and of Staten Island. He married Cornelia Harris, and may have lived in Essex County for a time. Zeliff was the owner of the White Horse Tavern in Lincoln Park, and lived in the same town, in a house which is said to have had ceiling murals in a floral pattern which he created himself. Only one painting by his hand is identified; this is The Barnyard, currently owned by the National Gallery of Art. Descendants, however, remember other pieces, including pictures of horses as well as a snow scene and a depiction of Queen Victoria. Furthermore, a directory of 1897–1898 published in Morris County lists him as a "painter" by trade. Little is known about Zeliff. His name appears on a list of commissioners of deeds for Morris County in 1892, and in a handful of legal records related to a property case involving land.

Zeliff died in 1915, aged 84, and was buried in Paterson, New Jersey.
