= Morris County School of Technology =

Public secondary school in Morris County, New Jersey, United States

Location
- 400 East Main Street; Denville Township, Morris County, New Jersey 07834; United States; 40.8785°N 74.4791°W

Information
- Type: Vocational Magnet public high school
- Motto: Proud of Our Past Focused on Our Future
- Established: 1969
- School district: Morris County Vocational School District
- NCES School ID: 341072004348
- Principal: Mark Menadier (Academies); Lynne Jackson (Programs)
- Faculty: 75.5 FTEs
- Enrollment: 839 (as of 2023–24)
- Student to teacher ratio: 11.1:1
- Campus size: 39 acres (16 ha)
- Colors: Red and Black
- Athletics conference: Northwest Jersey Athletic Conference
- Team name: Devils
- Accreditation: Middle States Association of Colleges and Schools
- Website: www.mcvts.org

The Morris County School of Technology (MCVTS or MCST) is a vocational magnet public high school located in Denville Township, in Morris County, in the U.S. state of New Jersey, operating as part of the Morris County Vocational School District. This school prepares high school students for future careers, through its academy programs, each focusing on a particular trade as well as an advanced college preparatory program. Students apply to one of the 10 different academies in a process that starts the 8th grade year of local students. The highly competitive process begins with a general admissions test and is followed by group interviews on an academy basis. The school had an overall acceptance rate of 30% in 2016.

As of the 2023–24 school year, the school had an enrollment of 839 students and 75.5 classroom teachers (on an FTE basis), for a student–teacher ratio of 11.1:1. There were 36 students (4.3% of enrollment) eligible for free lunch and 11 (1.3% of students) eligible for reduced-cost lunch.

The district and its schools are accredited by the Middle States Association of Colleges and Schools Commission on Elementary and Secondary Schools until July 2031.

== Awards, recognition and rankings ==
In September 2013, the school was one of 15 in New Jersey to be recognized by the United States Department of Education as part of the National Blue Ribbon Schools Program, an award called the "most prestigious honor in the United States' education system" and which Education Secretary Arne Duncan described as schools that "represent examples of educational excellence".

In its listing of "America's Best High Schools 2016", the school was ranked 158th out of 500 best high schools in the country; it was ranked 27th among all high schools in New Jersey.

Schooldigger.com ranked the school 25th out of 381 public high schools statewide in its 2011 rankings (a decrease of 9 positions from the 2010 ranking) which were based on the combined percentage of students classified as proficient or above proficient on the mathematics (95.7%) and language arts literacy (98.8%) components of the High School Proficiency Assessment (HSPA).

USNews.com ranked the school the 112th in New Jersey High Schools in its 2026 ranking.

Niche.com ranked the school the 51st ut of 428 in New Jersey High Public High Schools oin its 2026 ranking

== History ==
The school started as a share time and adult program in 1969 and has now evolved into a full-time technical high school as well as one of the more respected schools in the Morris County area. The school still has share time students and adult programs although it will slowly start to dissolve the share time program to accommodate more kids in the full-time academies. The first year that this school started its full-time program was in 2004. 2007 marks the year that the school will finally have their first full-time graduate students. This initial group was only about 35 students and now the school has grown to serve over 400 students.

The school's adult education program includes all the academies that students can choose and the program is usually at night. The school is accredited by the New Jersey Department of Education, by the Council on Occupational Education and by the Middle States Association of Colleges and Schools Commission on Elementary and Secondary Schools since 1989.

Academy graduates will qualify for post-secondary education at the college level, gain admission to technical schools, or be ready for entry-level employment. Graduates of MCST have gone on to schools related to their academies. Many acquire college credits while still in high school, giving them a head start on a college education at significant cost savings.

== Admissions ==
The Morris County School of Technology has a rigorous admissions process that makes it one of the most difficult schools to get into in the Morris County area. There are four phases to the admissions process

=== Phase one ===
Students will submit their initial applications with their 7th grade transcript as well as a teacher and counselor recommendation. They will also select their desired academy. This phase typically lasts from September to December.

=== Phase two ===
Students take the admissions test on a day selected during phase one, which is used to determine class placement should the student be accepted.

=== Phase three ===
Students at or above the minimum score for their desired academy (determined after test administration) will be entered into the random selection process. Applicants who do not meet the minimum score will receive a notice of non-acceptance.

==== Pre-2021 phase three ====
Prior to 2021, students would complete a group interview instead of the random selection process. This interview included general questions about the student's goals and why they want to attend the school, as well as a task to complete with a fellow interviewee related to their desired academy.

=== Phase four ===
Students will be notified of their acceptance or waitlist position after the random selection process has taken place. Accepted students will accept or decline their offer of admission during this phase.

== Full-time academies ==
=== Academy for Health Care Sciences ===
The Academy of Health Care Sciences prepares students for the field of medicine. Throughout the years, students take classes in dynamics of health care, medical terminology, clinical practicum, clinical research, nutrition, medical math, anatomy and physiology I & II, along with other important classes related to their field. Students participate in lab dissections such as a sheep's heart during their freshman year, a fetal pig during their sophomore year, and a cat during their junior year. Sophomore year, students have the chance to volunteer and help teach students with cerebral palsy. Junior year, part of the curriculum entails clinical experience by having the chance to interact with patients with Alzheimer's disease and dementia. Also, in certain subjects, students have the chance to earn college credits from Rutgers University after passing the requisite tests. Seniors can attend a dual enrollment program at the County College of Morris or can complete a capstone project. Students from the healthcare academy have a high percent matriculate to the top schools in the nation with recent graduates being accepted to Boston College, New York University, and Johns Hopkins University. Several students a year also matriculate to the Ivy League, recently including Harvard University, Princeton University, Cornell University, and the University of Pennsylvania. A number of other students choose to attend 7 or 8 year dental programs as well as 7 to 8 year medical programs.

=== Academy for Visual and Performing Arts ===
This academy prepares students for a career in the performing arts fields. Students can major in Dance, Theater, or Vocal Performance. The Dance program focuses on modern, jazz, and ballet technique. Students in the Theater program focus on all aspects of performing and backstage work, including acting, directing, and theatrical design. The vocal performance program focuses on ensemble and solo vocal performances and teaching various aspects of music theory. Students interact with professional guest artists currently working in the field and are able to see productions in New York City. Students applying to the VPA academy are required to audition for the academy as well as completing the basic admissions process. Students in this academy currently attend Morris Knolls High School. Twelfth grade students can attend a dual enrollment program at the County College of Morris or can complete a set of capstone coursework.

=== Academy for Multimedia ===
This academy prepares students for careers in film, photography, and broadcasting. This academy had been part of the Academy for Visual and Performing Arts, but split when the VPA program moved to Morris Knolls High School. The Multimedia academy focuses on digital art, film, and photography, with students working mostly on computers to create movies and graphic art. Twelfth grade students can attend a dual enrollment program at the County College of Morris. Alternatively, twelfth grade students can complete a capstone project.

=== Academy for Education and Learning ===
This academy is designed to provide first-hand experience for its students who would like to work with children upon graduation. Students get the opportunity to observe and to teach a class of preschool-aged children each class. They are required to do a year-long child study and to eventually teach an individual day among other projects. Students in twelfth grade can attend a dual enrollment program through either County College of Morris or Centenary University, or can complete an alternative capstone project.

=== Academy for Computer and Information Sciences ===
The academy prepares students for careers in computer programming and IT. Ninth grade students learn how to program in Java and do exploratory work into a variety of computer-related career paths, such as video game design, web design, and computer hardware. Tenth grade students take AP Computer Science Principles and learn the basics of software design and how to handle clients. Eleventh grade students take a class on emerging technologies, currently learning the fundamentals of cybersecurity and artificial intelligence. These students are also required to take the AP Computer Science A exam. Twelfth grade students can attend a dual enrollment program with either the County College of Morris or Montclair State University. Alternatively, students can complete an academic capstone and are free to choose from a variety of projects, including but not limited to robotics and computer programming. This academy also organizes HackMCST, the school's annual hackathon.

=== Academy for Design ===
The Academy for Design provides foundational skills for diverse careers in the creative field. Students explore a range of creative disciplines and develop their abilities through hands-on study. The program helps students create a professional portfolio while developing creative thinking problem-solving, and design skills.

Freshman Year Studies: Drawing I, Two-Dimensional Design, Color Theory, Digital Design (Adobe inDesign, Illustrator, Photoshop)

Sophomore Year Studies Include: Drawing II, Three-Dimensional Design, Digital Photography, Graphic Design Studio (Client Experience)

Junior Year Studies: Spatial Analysis (Architecture/Interior Design), Form Development, Understanding Human Form, Animation, Web Design (Personal Portfolio Sites)

Senior year students can attend a dual enrollment program at the County College of Morris or can complete a capstone project.

Graduates of the Academy for Design have gone into careers in Graphic Design, Web Design, Video Game Design, Multimedia Studies, Video Production, Advertising, and Marketing.

=== Academy for Culinary Arts ===
The school of Culinary Arts is a full-time, four-year high school program for students entering the ninth grade. The course of studies is designed in a sequential pattern which will prepare the students for entry into technical fields in various areas of the culinary arts industry.

Studies are concentrated in the areas of: Equipment Use and Care, Fundamentals of Food Preparation, Nutrition, Baking, Table Service, Regional and International Cuisine, and Restaurant Management.

In the 9th grade students begin with basics such as knife skills, fundamentals of food preparation and workspace organization. In grades 10 and 11, students will have the opportunity to concentrate interest and talents into their career path and earn ServSafe certifications. In grade 12, students can participate in advanced electives, work experience or courses at the County College of Morris.

=== Academy for Construction Arts ===
The academy is a share-time program of studies offering students both technical and academic subjects. As in a local high school, students enrolled in the academy must take a full range of college prep academic subjects such as English, Mathematics, Science, Social Studies, world Languages and Health and Physical Education.

Students in this academy have many career pathways. these include: carpenter, plumber, electrician, telecommunications technician, engineer, designer, architect, furniture maker, inspector, metal fabricator, and installer. The Morris County School of Technology has collaborative partners for this academy; these partners are the County College of Morris, the Pennsylvania College of Technology, Johnson Technical Institute, the International Brotherhood of Electrical Workers, and the District Council of Northern New Jersey Ironworkers.

=== Academy for Global Commerce ===
This academy teaches students the essentials of the business world, preparing them for careers in business. Students in Finance & International Business are taught law, business ethics, accounting, and other essential topics for a successful career in the business world. In 2020, the Global Supply Chain Management academy was added as a sister academy to Finance & International Business. Students in Global Supply Chain Management are taught how to organize and optimize sustainable supply chains. In 2022, the academies were reorganized into Global Commerce, with both still existing independently under the umbrella label. Coursework is the same between the two academies in ninth grade, and then diverges in tenth grade. In twelfth grade, students in both academies can attend a dual enrollment program at either the County College of Morris or Fairleigh Dickinson University, or can complete an alternative capstone project.

=== Academy for Animal Science ===
The academy that prepares students to go into animal related careers. The academy has several different species in its animal collection and allows students to become versed in the animal industry through hands-on animal care. It also allows students to independently care for the animal collection and develop independent skills and ethical viewpoints. Twelfth grade students can attend a dual enrollment program through County College of Morris or Centenary University, or can complete an alternate capstone program.

=== Academy for Math, Science and Engineering ===
The Academy for Mathematics, Science, and Engineering, a satellite academy of Morris County School of Technology located in Rockaway, has the highest combined SAT scores in the country and is one of the most difficult high schools to get into in the country. On average over a thousand middle school students apply to the Math, Science and Engineering Academy and only 7% are accepted. The school only accepts multiples of 22/23 and only if 44/46 people meet the demanding qualifications for the school, making it an incredibly difficult school to get into. AP classes are mandatory, and students take advanced classes such as Trigonometry and Physics freshman year.

=== Academy for Law and Public Safety ===
The Academy for Law and Public Safety prepares students for careers as lawyers and other law-related fields. This academy was a satellite academy located in Butler, New Jersey on the campus of Butler High School. As of 2015, Law and Public Safety has moved to the Denville campus. Twelfth grade students have the option to attend a dual enrollment program at County College of Morris, Centenary University, or Ramapo College. Alternatively, these students can complete a capstone project.

=== Academy for Sports Medicine ===
Started in 2014, this program focuses on teaching students about physiology and exercise sciences, preparing them for work as physical trainers or medical professionals in athletics. As of 2019, Sports Medicine students attend Roxbury High School. Twelfth grade students can attend a dual enrollment program at the County College of Morris or can complete a set of capstone coursework.

=== Academy for Biotechnology ===
The Academy for Biotechnology prepares students for careers in medical and scientific laboratory environments. The academy was originally at Mountain Lakes High School, but moved to the Denville campus in 2020. Students in this academy learn essential lab techniques, bioethics, experimental design, research, and engineering and design principles. Twelfth-grade students can attend a dual enrollment program at the County College of Morris or can complete a capstone project.

== Athletics ==
The Morris Tech Devils compete in the Northwest Jersey Athletic Conference, which is comprised of public and private high schools in Morris, Sussex and Warren counties, and was established following a reorganization of sports leagues in Northern New Jersey by the New Jersey State Interscholastic Athletic Association (NJSIAA). With 656 students in grades 10-12, the school was classified by the NJSIAA for the 2019–20 school year as Group II for most athletic competition purposes, which included schools with an enrollment of 486 to 758 students in that grade range.

In 2005, the school debuted its first sport programs. The sports that were offered were cross country, boys and girls soccer, girls volleyball, boys and girls basketball, bowling, cheerleading, baseball, softball and golf. As of 2011, the cheerleading program was suspended due to budget cuts.

As of 2018-19 the sports offered include: Fall - Girls and Boys Cross Country, Girls and Boys Soccer, and Girls Volleyball / Winter - Girls and Boys Basketball, and Coed Bowling / Spring- Baseball, Softball, Boys and Girls Golf.
