= Morris County Vocational School District =

School district in Morris County, New Jersey, US

Coordinates: 40.879139°N 74.479755°W

Address
- 400 East Main Street Denville Township, Morris County, New Jersey, 07834; United States

District information
- Grades: Vocational
- Superintendent: Scott Moffitt
- Business administrator: James Rollo
- Schools: 6

Students and staff
- Enrollment: 1,123 (as of 2019–20)
- Faculty: 72.5 FTEs
- Student–teacher ratio: 15.5:1

Other information
- Website: www.mcvts.org
Ind.	Per pupil	District spending	Rank (*)	Vocational average	%± vs. average
1A	Total Spending	$21,469	9	$18,891	13.6%
1	Budgetary Cost	17,415	12	17,296	0.7%
2	Classroom Instruction	9,604	14	9,045	6.2%
6	Support Services	2,219	13	2,269	−2.2%
8	Administrative Cost	2,783	12	2,353	18.3%
10	Operations & Maintenance	2,487	7	3,014	−17.5%
13	Extracurricular Activities	285	8	464	−38.6%
16	Median Teacher Salary	72,064	18	65,035
Data from NJDoE 2014 Taxpayers' Guide to Education Spending. *Of Vocational districts with any number of students. Lowest spending=1; Highest=21

The Morris County Vocational School District is a countywide public school district that provides vocational and technical education to public high school students in Morris County, in the U.S. state of New Jersey. The district is headquartered in Denville Township.

As of the 2019–20 school year, the district, comprising six schools, had an enrollment of 1,123 students and 72.5 classroom teachers (on an FTE basis), for a student–teacher ratio of 15.5:1.

The district and its schools are accredited by the Middle States Association of Colleges and Schools Commission on Elementary and Secondary Schools.

== Schools ==
Schools in the district (with 2019–20 enrollment data from the National Center for Education Statistics) are:

- Academy for Sports Medicine at Roxbury High School in Succasunna with NA students in grades 9-12
- Academy for Environmental Science at Jefferson Township High School in Oak Ridge with 54 students in grades 9-12
- Academy for Mathematics, Science, and Engineering at Morris Hills High School in Rockaway with 164 students in grades 9-12
- Academy for Performing Arts at Morris Knolls High School in Rockaway (78; 9-12)
- Morris County School of Technology in Denville Township with 807 students in grades 9-12

== Administration ==
Core members of the district's administration are:

- Scott Moffitt, superintendent
- James Rollo, business administrator and board secretary

== Board of education ==
The district's board of education, comprised of five members, sets policy and oversees the fiscal and educational operation of the district through its administration. As a Type I school district, the board's trustees are appointed by the Morris County Board of County Commissioners to serve three-year terms of office on a staggered basis, with either one or two seats up for reappointment each year. The board appoints a superintendent to oversee the district's day-to-day operations and a business administrator to supervise the business functions of the district.
