= Academy for Mathematics, Science, and Engineering =

Magnet high school in Morris County, New Jersey, US

Academy for Math, Science, and Engineering

Location
- 520 West Main Street; Rockaway, Morris County, New Jersey 07866; United States; 40.8908°N 74.5292°W

Information
- Type: Magnet public high school
- School district: Morris County Vocational School District
- Superintendent: Jim Jencarelli
- CEEB code: 310274
- NCES School ID: 341072000522
- Director: Cheryl Giordano
- Principal: Todd Toriello
- Faculty: NA FTEs
- Enrollment: 181 (as of 2024–25)
- Student to teacher ratio: NA
- Accreditation: Middle States Association of Colleges and Schools Commission on Elementary and Secondary Schools
- Website: www.mcvts.org/fs/pages/783

The Academy for Mathematics, Science, and Engineering (AMSE) is a four-year magnet public high school program intended to prepare students for STEM careers. Housed on the campus of Morris Hills High School in Rockaway, in the U.S. state of New Jersey, it is a joint endeavor between the Morris County Vocational School District and the Morris Hills Regional District.

AMSE is one of 17 vocational academies under the Morris County Vocational School District, which administers the admissions process for prospective AMSE students. The program started in 2000 with an initial class size of 26, but in 2017, the class size was increased to 48 students.

As of the 2024-2025 school year, the school had an enrollment of 181 students.

== History ==
=== Background ===
As interest in traditional vocational subjects began to decrease in the 1990s, New Jersey's vocational school districts began to experiment with new programs that would cater to gifted students interested in careers in high technology and science. Hudson County's High Tech High School was founded in 1991, Bergen County Academies in 1992, and Union County Magnet School in 1997. Created as programs under New Jersey's Career and Technical Education legislation, the schools are overseen by the New Jersey Department of Education's Office of Career Readiness, which manages their standards, approval, and reapproval.

AMSE was first proposed to the Morris County Board of Chosen Freeholders (now the Board of County Commissioners) in November 1997 as the “Morris County Academy for Math, Science, and Engineering.” James DeWorken, Superintendent of the Morris County Vocational Board, asked the Freeholders for $5 million to build a new high-tech school on the campus of the County College of Morris in Randolph. Modeled after Monmouth County's High Technology High School, which had opened in 1991, the new program would open with 60 students, eventually expanding to 240, who would take up to 40 credits of college courses at the County College.

Although the County College supported the concept, the Freeholders raised concerns over the proposal's high cost, which, along with a number of other projects that had already been planned, would further accumulate debt and increase the burden on taxpayers. The Freeholders also noted worries that the program might simply be "a duplication of what [was] offered by other districts" and a lack of support from some district superintendents due to the increased competition that the new academy would bring.

DeWorken worked to gather support from district superintendents as well as local industry leaders and colleges. The Freeholders eventually approved a revised proposal in October 1999. Under the new plan, AMSE and three other academies were proposed again, but now as specialized programs within existing public high schools, effectively lowering their cost. The Superintendent of the Morris Hills Regional High School District at the time, James McNasby, helped bring AMSE to Morris Hills High School. The school's old vocational building was replaced using $1.4 million of county funds. The new building (named the “Dr. James J. McNasby Technology Center” in honor of the superintendent) serves as the home of the academy. The academy opened its doors to 24 students on September 5, 2000, and a ribbon-cutting ceremony took place on October 11, 2000.

=== Program changes ===
Beginning with the class of 2021, the academy class size was increased from 26 to 48 students. In a statement to the Hilltopper, the Morris Hills student newspaper, Academy Director Cheryl Giordano described the rationale behind the school's expansion, saying “We were turning away extremely talented students who had a passion for STEM and wanted to be in a program that helped nurture their interests.”

In 2021, the AMSE steering committee, a group of administrators from both the Morris Hills Vocational School District and the Morris Hills Regional District, announced changes to AMSE. Under the proposed changes, the program would be renamed “The Academy for Engineering,” the zero-block would be eliminated, and students would no longer be required to take honors humanities classes. The changes were rescinded after students successfully appealed to the Morris County Vocational School District Board of Education in November, arguing that the changes would hurt the program and the “Academy's culture for years to come.”

== Awards and recognition ==
In its 2023 rankings, Niche rated the academy as 1st in its Best High Schools for STEM in America, an increase from the 2022 ranking, in which the school was ranked 9th. Niche also rated the academy 2nd in its Best Public High School Teachers in America ranking and 9th in its Best Magnet High Schools in America ranking in 2023. For the 2020–2021 school year, SchoolDigger ranked AMSE as the third out of all public high schools in New Jersey.

The Academy was ranked as the second-best high school in America in Newsweek's 2016 "America's Top High Schools" ranking, a minor bump from Newsweek's 2015 ranking in which it was ranked 3rd best high school in America. The school's Newsweek ranking, however, fell in 2016 when AMSE SAT scores began to be counted under Morris Hills High School, and AMSE was ranked the 79th best STEM high school in the nation in 2020. The class of 2021 had an average SAT score of 1517.

The Morris County Vocational School District is accredited by the Middle States Association of Colleges and Schools Commission on Elementary and Secondary Schools, and the academy is also a member of the National Consortium of Secondary STEM Schools.

== Campus ==
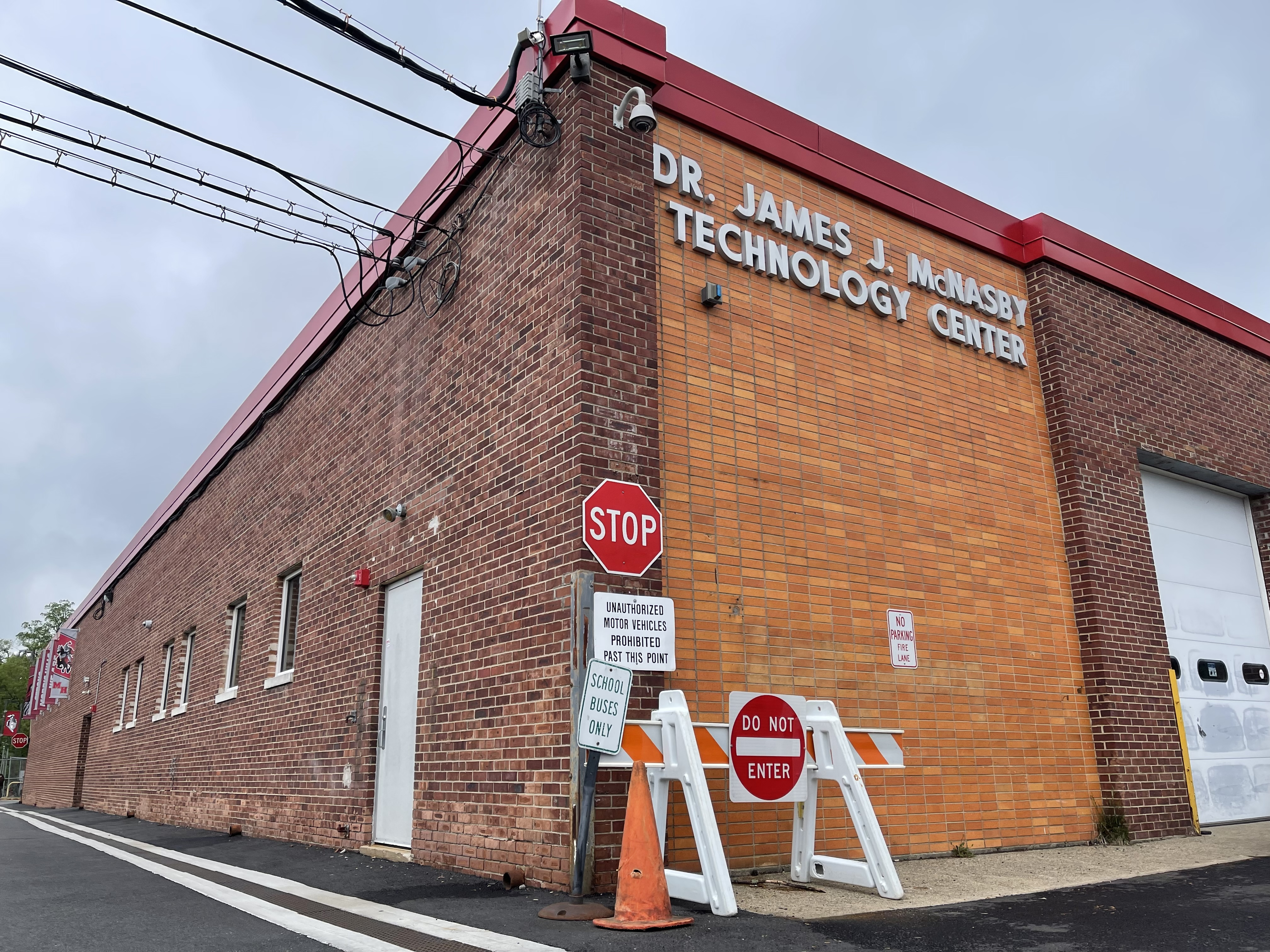
The Dr. James. J. McNasby Technology Building

Although the academy is a program in the Morris County Vocational School District (the main campus of which is in Denville), it is a satellite academy that is located on the campus of Morris Hills High School. Ever since its inception in 2000, the academy has been housed in the Dr. James J. McNasby Technology Center, a small, modern building on the Morris Hills campus separate from the primary building that provides facilities for automotive shop, computer aided design lab (including a 3D printer), and a graphics workshop (including large plotters and screen printers). Students enrolled in the academy attend classes in both buildings; the joint nature of the program allows students to enjoy normal interaction with Morris Hills' public high school students.

In 2017, a new roof was installed and a makerspace was created in the building.

== Admissions and Enrollment ==
Student body composition as of 2025
Race and ethnicity	Total
Asian	153
White	15
Two or more Races	5
Hispanic	7
Black	1
Gender	Total
Male	113
Female	68

Admission to the academy is competitive—in the 2021–2022 school year, 28.4% of applicants were admitted. AMSE typically receives the most applications out of all Morris County Vocational School District programs.

In order to be eligible for the program, students must reside in Morris County and have taken Algebra 1 by eight grade. All applicants submit recommendations, middle school grades, and a “video submission.” All students applying to Morris County Vocational School District programs take the same English language arts test, but AMSE applicants must take a different mathematics test based on algebra 1 concepts. Students' scores are compiled on a rubric, and if the number of applicants who have scored higher than a predetermined cutoff is greater than the number of seats in the program, a random selection process is used to select from those students who scored higher than the cutoff. Admitted freshmen must attend a mandatory two week summer program, in which students take part in CAD, Math Analysis 1, AP Physics 1, and Humanities classes.

In the 2020–2021 school year, 65-70% of students were male and 30-35% were female. 81.2% of students were Asian, 13.6% were White, and 1.9% were Hispanic. There have been concerns about the school's diversity and the underrepresentation of Black and Hispanic students.

AMSE is mostly funded by funds from state, county, and federal taxpayers. The Morris County Vocational School District also charges its students' sending districts, the public school districts which they would have otherwise attended, a tuition fee. The fee, which is detailed in a Collaboration Agreement between the two districts, is divided between them; the Morris Hills Regional District receives 91% of the tuition per pupil monthly.

== Extracurriculars ==
Students can participate in extracurriculars with other students in Morris Hills High School, which offers over 80 clubs and 29 sports. Students, on rare occasions, have also been able to participate in activities at the public school district they would have attended if they had not attended AMSE, their "sending district," with the approval of that district's Board of Education. Some Morris Hills student groups are composed primarily of AMSE students, such as the boys tennis team.

== Academics ==
Academy students must accumulate 170 credits to graduate, 50 credits more than the New Jersey state graduation requirement and 30 credits more than Morris Hills High School graduation requirement. In doing so, students must meet multiple sets of requirements imposed by the state, the school district, and the academy itself.

State requirements include physical education yearly, one year of a foreign language, one year of fine arts, one year of business and financial literacy, and one computer proficiency class. In practice, the business requirement is fulfilled by the mandatory Academy Business Strategies course, the computer requirement is fulfilled by the mandatory CAD courses, and most students take three or four years of a language in accordance with the recommendations of highly selective universities. The only remaining requirements that students must pay attention to is the visual and performing arts requirement. The art requirement can be fulfilled through the Morris Hills offerings consisting of Chorus, Band, String Ensemble, Music Appreciation, Fundamentals of Music 1, AP Music Theory, Foundation Art, Drawing and Painting, Digital Art and Design, AP Studio Art, and AP Art History, among others.

Academy course requirements are listed below. Notably, students go through the science curriculum by taking physics, then chemistry, then biology in an approach named "Physics First." (Note: The academy curriculum employs the Physics First approach, in which freshmen take an introductory physics course (AP Physics 1) rather than the traditional biology course offered to most high school freshmen. The primary difficulty with the implementation of Physics First in most high school curricula is that most high school freshmen lack the required Algebra 1 background prior to beginning the introductory physics course, but since all academy students are required to enter freshman year having completed an Algebra I course, AMSE does not encounter this issue. The Physics First approach emphasizes concepts in Physics in the instruction of Chemistry and concepts of Chemistry in the instruction of biology.). Students must take multiple science and technology courses, such as computer aided drafting and engineering. Students must also take four years of mathematics instead of three, one year more than the state and district requirement.

The academy operates on a quarterly grading system and uses a 100-point numerical scale. Grade point averages are thus based out of 100 rather than the traditional 4.0 used by many other high schools. Honors courses receive 5 extra points when factored into the GPA calculation, and Advanced Placement courses receive 10 extra points when factored into the GPA calculation. Academy students are not ranked due to the competitiveness of the program and the small class size.

=== Curriculum by Year ===
All courses denoted "Academy" are taught at the honors level and are taught to only students of the academy. These courses are often more rigorous than their counterparts taught to Morris Hills students. All courses denoted "AP" represent courses under the Advanced Placement program offered by the College Board. These courses are taught to a mixed group of students from both the academy and Morris Hills, with the exception of freshman year AP Physics 1.

==== Freshman Year ====
- Academy AP Physics 1
- Geometry H
- Academy Mathematical Analysis 1 (Algebra II and Trigonometry)
- Academy Introduction to Computer-Aided Design (CAD)
- Academy English 1
- Academy Social Studies 1
- Physical Education/Health 9
- Two electives

Freshmen who enter AMSE already having taken a geometry course in middle school are eligible to place out of the course through an end-of-course exam. Students who receive a passing score take an additional elective course.

==== Sophomore Year ====
- Academy Mathematical Analysis 2 (Pre-calculus)
- AP Chemistry
- Academy Fundamentals of Engineering (CAD 2)
- Academy Engineering & Product Development 1
- Academy English 2
- Academy Social Studies 2
- Physical Education/Health 10
- Two electives

==== Junior Year ====
- Calculus: either AP Calculus BC, AP Calculus AB, or Calculus & Analytic Geometry H
- AP Biology
- Academy Engineering & Product Development 2
- Academy Business Strategies
- English: either AP Language and Composition, AP Literature and Composition, or English 11 H
- History: either AP United States History, or CPA United States History 2
- Physical Education/Health 11
- Two electives

==== Senior Year ====
- Academy Macroeconomics (semester course)
- Academy Technical Writing (semester course)
- Academy Biotechnology
- Academy Engineering & Product Development 3
- Academy Senior Internship (pass/fail)
- Mathematics: either Calculus 3 H, AP Statistics, or AP Computer Science A
- English: either AP Language and Composition, AP Literature and Composition, CPA English 12, Creative Writing, or Service Learning
- Four electives

=== Product Development Sequence ===
Unique to AMSE itself is its three-year Engineering and Product Development sequence, spanning an academy student's sophomore, junior, and senior years. Engineering and Product Development courses are meant to “create well-rounded engineers adept in electronics, robotics, drafting, mechanical engineering, manufacturing, and product development.”

==== Academy Engineering and Product Development 1 ====
The first installment in the Engineering and Product Development series, taken in an academy student's sophomore year, focuses primarily on electronics and robotics. Students taking the course, which is primarily hands-on, will gain experience working with various hand tools, electronic components, and robotics components. Units within the course are as follows:

- Safety and Resource Management
- Introduction to Electricity
- Measurement and Prototyping Tools
- Basic Circuits
- Series and Parallel Circuits
- Electronics
- Binary and Language
- Robotics History and Soft Skills
- Programming and Sensors
- Mechanical Robotic Systems
- Combined Robotic Systems

==== Academy Engineering and Product Development 2 ====
The second installment in the Engineering and Product Development series is taken in an academy student's junior year. Students will be placed in a woodshop environment for half of the course, focusing on different types of woods, various saws, abrasives, finishes, etc. The other half of the course is spent in a metalworking and manufacturing environment, which will afford students experience with benchwork machinery, welding techniques, manual and CNC milling, etc. Units within the course are as follows:

- Orientation and Safety and Shop Procedures in the Woodshop
- Measuring and Layout Tools
- Lumber and Its Properties
- Intro to Hand Tools
- Portable Power Tools
- Stationary Power Tools and Equipment
- Adhesives, Fasteners, and Joinery
- Abrasives and Surface Preparation
- Wood Finishes and Solvents
- Career Exploration
- Project Planning/Development (Home Construction)
- Orientation and Workshop Safety in the Metalshop
- Properties of Metals
- Shop Drawings and Layout
- Sheet Metal
- Precision Measurement and Error
- Arc Welding
- Machine Tools
- CNC Machining

==== Academy Engineering and Product Development 3 ====
The third installment in the Engineering and Product Development series is taken in an academy student's senior year. The course is meant to be a culmination of each previous Engineering and Product Development course, and also incorporates important principles that Academy students would have learned in previous science and mathematics courses. Students taking the course are placed into teams of approximately four, which “design, develop, and implement a product of their choosing that is centered on the need to solve a global problem.” The conclusion of the course features an “Engineering Showcase;” an evening event at which each team presents their final, alpha prototype to interested parties, including industry professionals. The product development process is split into an introductory unit plus six “milestones,” which are as follows:

- Getting Started (introduction)
- Milestone #1: The Problem and Solutions
- Milestone #2: Feasibility
- Milestone #3: Prototyping
- Milestone #4: Testing the Prototype
- Milestone #5: Achieving Success
- Milestone #6: Presentation of Products and Engineering Showcase

=== Advanced Placement offerings ===
Academy students can choose from a comprehensive list of 27 Advanced Placement courses offered by Morris Hills High School. As part of AMSE's curriculum, academy students will be enrolled in AP Physics 1 during their freshman year, AP Chemistry during their sophomore year, and AP Biology during their junior year. The academy curriculum provides for 10 elective courses to be taken over a student's four years at AMSE, allowing students to choose several Advanced Placement electives throughout high school. The exact number of elective slots able to be filled by Advanced Placement courses can be affected by placement out of Academy Geometry Honors, desire to continue studying a foreign language, and how an academy student chooses to fulfill their art course graduation requirement.

Morris Hills High School offers students the option to take any Advanced Placement exam offered by the College Board, even those for which there is not a corresponding course at the school. Students may choose to self-study such courses during the school year through the school's Gifted and Talented Program. Nearly all Academy students earn college credits while in high school. Most of these credits are earned through high scores achieved on Advanced Placement exams, as well as courses approved the New Jersey Institute of Technology, which AMSE has an articulation agreement with.

=== Senior-year internship ===
The senior year internship is a mandatory component of the academy curriculum and students cannot graduate without having completed one (or more internship) totaling to one hundred hours. The internship must be approved by the board of education of the Morris County Vocational School District and must be demonstrably related to the fields of mathematics, science, and engineering.
