= Rockaway Township Public Schools =

School district in Morris County, New Jersey, US

Address
- 16 School Road Hibernia, Morris County, New Jersey, 07842; United States
- Coordinates: 40.943649°N 74.493347°W

District information
- Grades: K-8
- Superintendent: Richard R. Corbett
- Business administrator: Megan Slamb
- Schools: 6

Students and staff
- Enrollment: 2,386 (as of 2022–23)
- Faculty: 248.2 FTEs
- Student–teacher ratio: 9.6:1

Other information
- District Factor Group: I
- Website: www.rocktwp.net
Ind.	Per pupil	District spending	Rank (*)	K-8 average	%± vs. average
1A	Total Spending	$19,907	75	$18,891	5.4%
1	Budgetary Cost	17,159	81	14,159	21.2%
2	Classroom Instruction	9,883	78	8,659	14.1%
6	Support Services	3,109	81	2,167	43.5%
8	Administrative Cost	1,931	77	1,547	24.8%
10	Operations & Maintenance	2,219	82	1,612	37.7%
13	Extracurricular Activities	11	3	104	−89.4%
16	Median Teacher Salary	63,487	59	61,136
Data from NJDoE 2014 Taxpayers' Guide to Education Spending. *Of K-8 districts with more than 750 students. Lowest spending=1; Highest=84

The Rockaway Township Public Schools is a comprehensive community public school district that serves students in pre-kindergarten through eighth grade in Rockaway Township, in Morris County, in the U.S. state of New Jersey.

As of the 2022–23 school year, the district, comprised of six schools, had an enrollment of 2,386 students and 248.2 classroom teachers (on an FTE basis), for a student–teacher ratio of 9.6:1.

The district is classified by the New Jersey Department of Education as being in District Factor Group "I", the second-highest of eight groupings. District Factor Groups organize districts statewide to allow comparison by common socioeconomic characteristics of the local districts. From lowest socioeconomic status to highest, the categories are A, B, CD, DE, FG, GH, I and J.

Public school students in ninth through twelfth grades attend either Morris Hills High School (those living in the White Meadow Lake section and other southern portions of the township) or Morris Knolls High School (the remainder of the township). Morris Hills (located in Rockaway Borough) also serves students from Wharton and some from Rockaway Borough (those mostly north of Route 46); Morris Knolls (located in Denville) serves all students from Denville and portions of Rockaway Borough (those mostly south of Route 46). As of the 2022–23 school year, Morris Hills High School had an enrollment of 1,187 students and 117.3 classroom teachers (on an FTE basis), for a student–teacher ratio of 10.1:1, while Morris Knolls had an enrollment of 1,447 students and 130.9 classroom teachers (on an FTE basis) and a student–teacher ratio of 11.1:1. The Academy for Mathematics, Science, and Engineering, a magnet high school program that is part of the Morris County Vocational School District is jointly operated on the Morris Hills campus. The two high schools are part of the Morris Hills Regional High School District.

== Awards and recognition ==
In 2024, Catherine A. Dwyer Elementary School was one of 11 school's statewide that was recognized as a Blue Ribbon School of Excellence by the United States Department of Education.

== Schools ==
Schools in the district (with 2022–23 enrollment data from the National Center for Education Statistics) are:

Elementary schools

- Birchwood Elementary School with 279 students in grades K-5
  - Jennifer Macones, principal
- Catherine A. Dwyer Elementary School with 322 students in grades K-5
  - Michael McGovern, principal
- Katherine D. Malone Elementary School with 259 students in grades K-5
  - Brian Rawlins, interim principal
- Dennis B. O'Brien Elementary School with 275 students in grades PreK-5
  - Chris Maragon, principal
- Stony Brook Elementary School with 391 students in grades K-5
  - Stephen Wisniewski, principal

Middle school

- Copeland Middle School with 853 students in grades 6-8
  - Dustin Bayer, principal

== Administration ==
Core members of the district's administration are:

- Richard R. Corbett, superintendent
- Megan Slamb, business administrator / board secretary

== Board of education ==
The district's board of education, comprised of seven members, sets policy and oversees the fiscal and educational operation of the district through its administration. As a Type II school district, the board's trustees are elected directly by voters to serve three-year terms of office on a staggered basis, with either two or three seats up for election each year held (since 2012) as part of the November general election. The board appoints a superintendent to oversee the district's day-to-day operations and a business administrator to supervise the business functions of the district.
