= Rockaway Borough Public Schools =

School district in Morris County, New Jersey, US

- District offices

Address
- 103 East Main Street Rockaway, Morris County, 07866; United States
- Coordinates: 40.897931°N 74.508464°W

District information
- Grades: PreK-8
- Superintendent: Anthony Grieco
- Business administrator: Giovanni Cusmano
- Schools: 2

Students and staff
- Enrollment: 574 (as of 2024–25)
- Faculty: 56.1 FTEs
- Student–teacher ratio: 10.2:1

Other information
- District Factor Group: FG
- Website: www.rockboro.org
Ind.	Per pupil	District spending	Rank (*)	K-8 average	%± vs. average
1A	Total Spending	$12,587	1	$18,891	−33.4%
1	Budgetary Cost	11,398	7	14,159	−19.5%
2	Classroom Instruction	6,098	2	8,659	−29.6%
6	Support Services	2,501	44	2,167	15.4%
8	Administrative Cost	1,401	13	1,547	−9.4%
10	Operations & Maintenance	1,295	17	1,612	−19.7%
13	Extracurricular Activities	70	16	104	−32.7%
16	Median Teacher Salary	49,502	2	61,136
Data from NJDoE 2014 Taxpayers' Guide to Education Spending. *Of K-8 districts with 401–750 students. Lowest spending=1; Highest=64

The Rockaway Borough Public Schools are a community public school district that serves students in pre-kindergarten through eighth grade from Rockaway Borough, in Morris County, in the U.S. state of New Jersey.

As of the 2024–25 school year, the district, comprised of two schools, had an enrollment of 574 students and 56.1 classroom teachers (on an FTE basis), for a student–teacher ratio of 10.2:1.

Public school students in ninth through twelfth grades attend Morris Hills High School (located in Rockaway Borough), which also serves students from Wharton and some from Rockaway Township (the White Meadow Lake section and other southern portions of the township). Morris Knolls High School serves all students from Denville (where the school is located) and most students from Rockaway Township (with the exception of White Meadow Lake and other areas in the southern part of the township). The two high schools are part of the Morris Hills Regional High School District As of the 2024–25 school year, the high school had an enrollment of 1,140 students and 117.0 classroom teachers (on an FTE basis), for a student–teacher ratio of 9.8:1.

== History ==
Rockaway High School was located in what would become Lincoln Elementary School, as part of a construction project completed in 1923 that added a second floor used by the high school.

The four constituent communities of Denville Township, Rockaway, Rockaway Township and Wharton voted in 1949 to create the Morris Hills Regional High School District. Until the district was created, students from the borough had attended Rockaway High School, which was operated by the borough's school district; the fact that the district had its own high school led some to believe that borough residents would oppose the referndum. The high school closed in 1953, with the opening of the regional Morris Hills High School.

The district had been classified by the New Jersey Department of Education as being in District Factor Group "FG", the fourth-highest of eight groupings. District Factor Groups organize districts statewide to allow comparison by common socioeconomic characteristics of the local districts. From lowest socioeconomic status to highest, the categories are A, B, CD, DE, FG, GH, I and J.

== Schools ==
Schools in the district (with 2024–25 enrollment data from the National Center for Education Statistics) are:

Elementary school

- Lincoln Elementary School with 272 students in grades PreK–3
  - Jennifer Skomial, principal

Middle school

- Thomas Jefferson Middle School with 299 students in grades 4–8
  - Leon Samuels, principal

== Administration ==
Core members of the district's administration are:

- Anthony Grieco, superintendent
- Giovanni Cusmano, business administrator and board secretary

== Board of education ==
The district's board of education is comprised of five members who set policy and oversee the fiscal and educational operation of the district through its administration. As a Type II school district, the board's trustees are elected directly by voters to serve three-year terms of office on a staggered basis, with either one or two seats up for election each year held (since 2015) as part of the November general election. The board appoints a superintendent to oversee the district's day-to-day operations and a business administrator to supervise the business functions of the district.
