= Denville Township School District =

School district in Morris County, New Jersey, US

Address
- 400 Morris Avenue Denville Township, Morris County, New Jersey, 07834; United States
- Coordinates: 40.865394°N 74.525497°W

District information
- Grades: Pre-K to 8
- Superintendent: Steven Forte
- Business administrator: Damaris Gurowsky
- Schools: 3

Students and staff
- Enrollment: 1,700 (as of 2023–24)
- Faculty: 167.8 FTEs
- Student–teacher ratio: 10.1:1

Other information
- District Factor Group: I
- Website: www.denville.org
Ind.	Per pupil	District spending	Rank (*)	K-8 average	%± vs. average
1A	Total Spending	$16,956	36	$18,891	−10.2%
1	Budgetary Cost	14,149	41	14,159	−0.1%
2	Classroom Instruction	9,027	60	8,659	4.2%
6	Support Services	2,273	54	2,167	4.9%
8	Administrative Cost	1,330	18	1,547	−14.0%
10	Operations & Maintenance	1,249	17	1,612	−22.5%
13	Extracurricular Activities	103	49	104	−1.0%
16	Median Teacher Salary	56,094	16	61,136
Data from NJDoE 2014 Taxpayers' Guide to Education Spending. *Of K-8 districts with more than 750 students. Lowest spending=1; Highest=84

The Denville Township School District is a comprehensive public school district serving students in pre-kindergarten through eighth grade from Denville Township, in Morris County, in the U.S. state of New Jersey in two elementary schools and a middle school.

As of the 2023–24 school year, the district, comprised of three schools, had an enrollment of 1,700 students and 167.8 classroom teachers (on an FTE basis), for a student–teacher ratio of 10.1:1.

The district had been classified by the New Jersey Department of Education as being in District Factor Group "I", the second-highest of eight groupings. District Factor Groups organize districts statewide to allow comparison by common socioeconomic characteristics of the local districts. From lowest socioeconomic status to highest, the categories are A, B, CD, DE, FG, GH, I and J.

Students in public school for ninth through twelfth grades attend Morris Knolls High School, which is located in Denville, but has a Rockaway address, along with most students from Rockaway Township. The high school is part of the Morris Hills Regional High School District, which also serves the residential communities of Rockaway Borough and Wharton. As of the 2023–24 school year, the high school had an enrollment of 1,473 students and 137.5 classroom teachers (on an FTE basis), for a student–teacher ratio of 10.7:1.

== Awards and recognition ==
Riverview Elementary School was one of nine schools in New Jersey honored in 2020 by the National Blue Ribbon Schools Program, which recognizes high student achievement.

== Schools ==
Schools in the district (with 2022–23 enrollment data from the National Center for Education Statistics) are:

Elementary schools

- Lakeview Elementary School with 691 students in grades PreK–5
  - Skye Sardanopoli, principal
- Riverview Elementary School with 460 students in grades K–5
  - Christina Theodoropoulos, principal

Middle school

- Valleyview Middle School with 539 students in grades 6–8
  - Seth Korman, principal

== Administration ==
Core members of the district's administration are:

- Steven Forte, superintendent
- Damaris Gurowsky, business administrator and board secretary

== Board of education ==
The district's board of education, comprised of seven members, sets policy and oversees the fiscal and educational operation of the district through its administration. As a Type II school district, the board's trustees are elected directly by voters to serve three-year terms of office on a staggered basis, with either two or three seats up for election each year held (since 2012) as part of the November general election. The board appoints a superintendent to oversee the district's day-to-day operations and a business administrator to supervise the business functions of the district.
