= Wharton Borough School District =

School district in Morris County, New Jersey, US

Coordinates: 40.895001°N 74.576971°W

Address
- 137 East Central Avenue Wharton, Morris County, New Jersey, 07885; United States

District information
- Grades: K-8
- Superintendent: Dr. Connie Sánchez
- Business administrator: Sandy Cammarata
- Schools: 2

Students and staff
- Enrollment: 767 (as of 2023–24)
- Faculty: 82.6 FTEs
- Student–teacher ratio: 9.3:1

Other information
- District Factor Group: DE
- Website: www.wbps.org
Ind.	Per pupil	District spending	Rank (*)	K-8 average	%± vs. average
1A	Total Spending	$16,030	20	$18,891	−15.1%
1	Budgetary Cost	14,785	58	14,159	4.4%
2	Classroom Instruction	9,649	75	8,659	11.4%
6	Support Services	2,098	45	2,167	−3.2%
8	Administrative Cost	1,581	47	1,547	2.2%
10	Operations & Maintenance	1,342	25	1,612	−16.7%
13	Extracurricular Activities	112	59	104	7.7%
16	Median Teacher Salary	60,555	36	61,136
Data from NJDoE 2014 Taxpayers' Guide to Education Spending. *Of K-8 districts with more than 750 students. Lowest spending=1; Highest=84

The Wharton Borough School District is a comprehensive community public school district that serves students in kindergarten through eighth grade from Wharton, in Morris County, in the U.S. state of New Jersey.

As of the 2023–24 school year, the district, comprised of two schools, had an enrollment of 767 students and 82.6 classroom teachers (on an FTE basis), for a student–teacher ratio of 9.3:1.

The district participates in the Interdistrict Public School Choice Program, which allows non-resident students to attend school in the district at no cost to their parents, with tuition covered by the resident district. Available slots are announced annually by grade.

The district had been classified by the New Jersey Department of Education as being in District Factor Group "DE", the fifth-highest of eight groupings. District Factor Groups organize districts statewide to allow comparison by common socioeconomic characteristics of the local districts. From lowest socioeconomic status to highest, the categories are A, B, CD, DE, FG, GH, I and J.

Public school students in ninth through twelfth grades attend Morris Hills High School, located in Rockaway Borough, and which also serves students from Rockaway Borough and portions of Rockaway Township. As of the 2023–24 school year, the high school had an enrollment of 1,141 students and 116.3 classroom teachers (on an FTE basis), for a student–teacher ratio of 9.8:1. The high school is part of the Morris Hills Regional High School District, which also includes students from Denville Township and parts of Rockaway Township, who attend Morris Knolls High School.

== Awards and recognition ==
Marie V. Duffy School was recognized by Governor Jim McGreevey in 2003 as one of 25 schools selected statewide for the First Annual Governor's School of Excellence award.

== Schools ==
Schools in the district (with 2023–24 enrollment data from the National Center for Education Statistics) are:

- Marie V. Duffy Elementary School with 424 students in grades K–5
  - Pamela S. Blalock, principal
- Alfred C. MacKinnon Middle School with 264 students in grades 6–8
  - Robert Hayzler, principal

== Administration ==
Core members of the district's administration are:

- Dr. Connie Sánchez, superintendent
- Sandy Cammarata, business administrator and board secretary

== Board of education ==
The district's board of education, comprised of seven members, sets policy and oversees the fiscal and educational operation of the district through its administration. As a Type II school district, the board's trustees are elected directly by voters to serve three-year terms of office on a staggered basis, with either two or three seats up for election each year held (since 2012) as part of the November general election. The board appoints a superintendent to oversee the district's day-to-day operations and a business administrator to supervise the business functions of the district.
