= Morris Hills Regional District =

School district in Morris County, New Jersey, US

Morris Hills Regional High School District

Address
- 48 Knoll Drive Rockaway, Morris County, New Jersey, 07866; United States
- Coordinates: 40.88587°N 74.507808°W

District information
- Grades: 9-12
- Established: 1949
- Superintendent: Nicholas Norcia
- Business administrator: Danielle Matovski
- Schools: 2
- NCES District ID: 3410740

Students and staff
- Enrollment: 2,626 (as of 2024–25)
- Faculty: 251.7 FTEs
- Student–teacher ratio: 10.4:1

Other information
- District Factor Group: GH
- Website: www.mhrd.org
Ind.	Per pupil	District spending	Rank (*)	9-12 average	%± vs. average
1A	Total Spending	$24,437	41	$18,891	29.4%
1	Budgetary Cost	16,796	32	15,592	7.7%
2	Classroom Instruction	9,633	34	8,807	9.4%
6	Support Services	2,575	31	2,294	12.2%
8	Administrative Cost	1,863	39	1,592	17.0%
10	Operations & Maintenance	1,763	15	1,954	−9.8%
13	Extracurricular Activities	983	33	873	12.6%
16	Median Teacher Salary	78,250	38	71,726
Data from NJDoE 2014 Taxpayers' Guide to Education Spending. *Of 9-12 districts with any number of students. Lowest spending=1; Highest=47

The Morris Hills Regional District, formally known as the Morris Hills Regional High School District, is a comprehensive regional public school district that consists of two four-year public high schools serving four suburban communities in Morris County, in the U.S. state of New Jersey. The district serves the residential communities of Denville Township (Denville Township School District), Rockaway Borough (Rockaway Borough Public Schools), Rockaway Township (Rockaway Township Public Schools) and Wharton (Wharton Borough School District).

As of the 2024–25 school year, the district, comprised of two schools, had an enrollment of 2,626 students and 251.7 classroom teachers (on an FTE basis), for a student–teacher ratio of 10.4:1.

== History ==
The four constituent communities voted in 1949 to create the regional high school district, which would allow 750 students then served by Boonton High School, Dover High School and Rockaway High School, with a goal of serving a total enrollment of 1,500. Students from Wharton, New Jersey attended Wharton High School, which opened in 1922 and closed when Morris Hills High School was opened in 1953.

The district had been classified by the New Jersey Department of Education as being in District Factor Group "GH", the third-highest of eight groupings. District Factor Groups organize districts statewide to allow comparison by common socioeconomic characteristics of the local districts. From lowest socioeconomic status to highest, the categories are A, B, CD, DE, FG, GH, I and J.

== Awards and recognition ==
For the 1996–97 school year, both Morris Hills High School and Morris Knolls High School were named as "Star Schools" by the New Jersey Department of Education, the highest honor that a New Jersey school can achieve.

== Schools ==
Schools in the district (with 2024–25 enrollment data from the National Center for Education Statistics) are:

- Morris Hills High School(1,140, located in Rockaway Borough) serves all students from Wharton, along with some students from Rockaway Borough and Rockaway Township (the White Meadow Lake section and other southern portions of the township). The Academy for Mathematics, Science, and Engineering, a magnet high school program that is part of the Morris County Vocational School District is jointly operated on the Morris Hills campus.
  - Dr. Todd M. Toriello, principal
- Morris Knolls High School (1,450, located in Denville) serves all students from Denville, as well as those from parts of Rockaway Borough and portions of Rockaway Township (most of the township, with the exception of White Meadow Lake and other areas in the southern part of the township).
  - Ryan MacNaughton, principal

== Administration ==
Core members of the district's administration are:

- Nicholas Norcia, superintendent
- Danielle Matovski, business administrator.

Nicholas Norcia, who had been the chief administrator of the Fair Lawn Public Schools, was selected as the district's superintendent in April 2023, with plans to take office the following July in Morris Hills.

== Board of education ==
The district's board of education, comprised of nine members, sets policy and oversees the fiscal and educational operation of the district through its administration. As a Type II school district, the board's trustees are elected directly by voters to serve three-year terms of office on a staggered basis, with three seats up for election each year held (since 2012) as part of the November general election. The board appoints a superintendent to oversee the district's day-to-day operations and a business administrator to supervise the business functions of the district. Seats on the board of education are allocated based on the populations of the constituent municipalities, with four seats assigned to Rockaway Township, three to Denville Township, one to Rockaway Borough and one to Wharton.
