= June Walker (Hadassah) =

June Walker (June 19, 1934 – July 29, 2008) was the Chairperson of the Conference of Presidents of Major American Jewish Organizations, and a member of AIPAC's Executive Committee. Until July 2007, she was the national president of Hadassah.

Walker had academic degrees in chemistry, respiratory therapy and public health administration. She taught on the college level and was the director of In-Service Education for Pulmonary Medicine at Columbia-Presbyterian Hospital. She was a member of the Citizens Committee for Bio-Medical Ethics, the American Red Cross and the American Lung Association.

She campaigned for then-U.S. Representative Barbara Boxer's Violence Against Women Act, launched educational programs on healthcare, brought Curriculum Watch into reality, and developed national participation in two marches for women's rights in Washington, D.C.

While Chair of the Hadassah College, Jerusalem (formerly known as the Hadassah College of Technology), the institution grew from six hundred to its current twenty-five hundred students. Her academic guidance helped the college change from offering two-year degrees to a wide range of bachelor's and master's degrees. As of 2007 it has been a fully accredited academic institution, helping to meet Israel's technology needs thorough various degree programs.

President George W. Bush appointed Walker to serve on the Honorary Delegation to accompany him to Jerusalem for the celebration of the 60th anniversary of the State of Israel in May 2008.

== Family ==
June Walker and her husband Barrett had three children and lived in Rockaway, New Jersey.

== Death ==
June Walker died in 2008, aged 74, from undisclosed causes.
