= Joseph Jackson House =

- U.S. National Register of Historic Places
- New Jersey Register of Historic Places
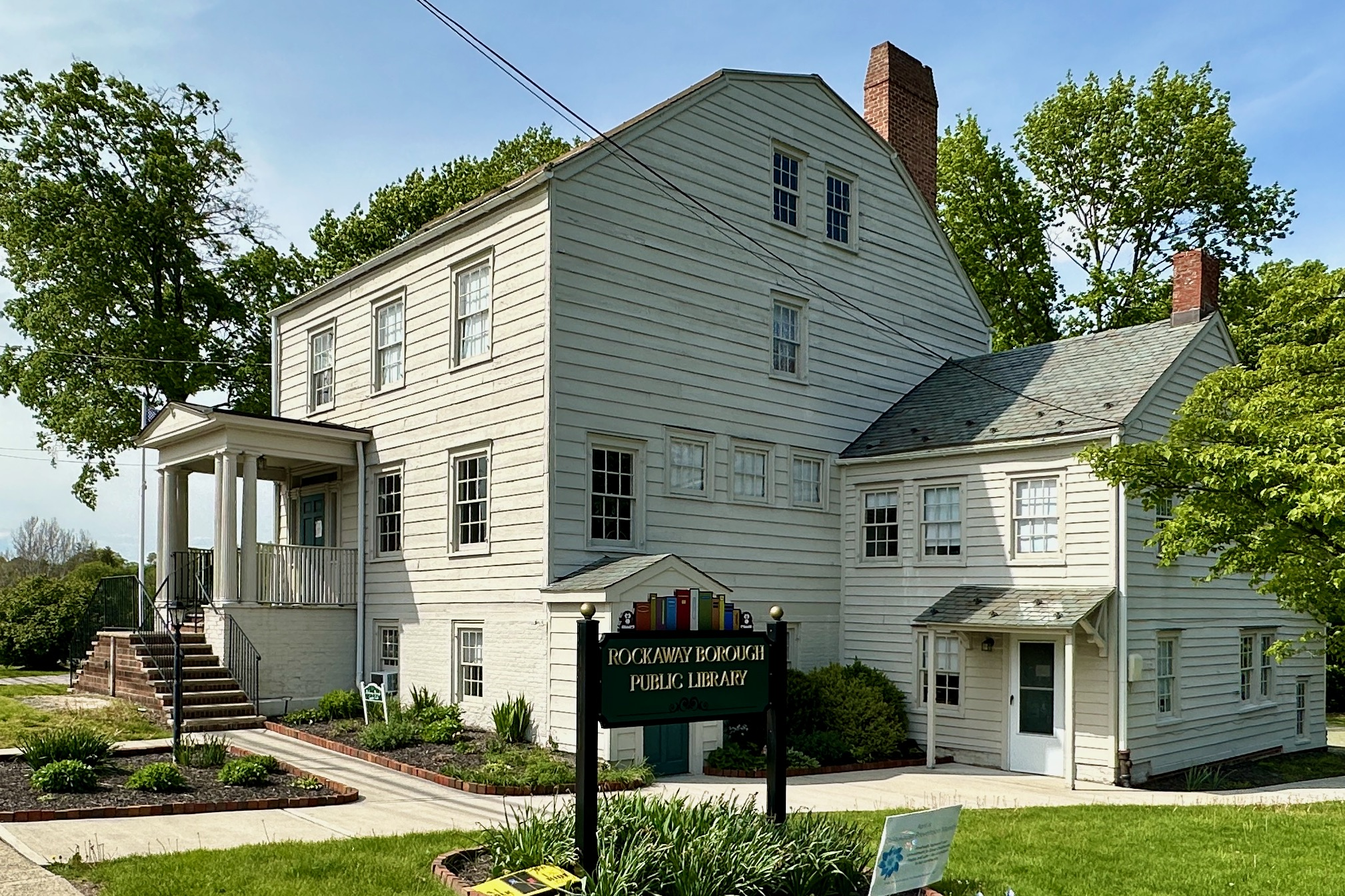
- Rockaway Borough Public Library

- Location within Morris County, New Jersey Location within New Jersey Location within the United States
- Location: 82 East Main Street, Rockaway, New Jersey
- Coordinates: 40°53′55″N 74°30′33″W
- Architectural style: Dutch Colonial
- NRHP reference No.: 75001155
- NJRHP No.: 2238

Significant dates
- Added to NRHP: March 4, 1975
- Designated NJRHP: November 19, 1974

The Joseph Jackson House, also known as the Colonel Joseph Jackson House, is a historic Dutch Colonial building located at 82 East Main Street in the borough of Rockaway in Morris County, New Jersey, United States. It was documented by the Historic American Buildings Survey (HABS) in 1938 and was added to the National Register of Historic Places on March 4, 1975, for its significance in industry. The house is now the Rockaway Borough Public Library.

== History and description ==
The house is a three and one-half story frame building featuring Dutch Colonial architecture. While Stephen Jackson (1744–1812) may have built it, the house is attributed to his son, Joseph Jackson (1774–1854), a prominent industrialist in Rockaway from 1812 to 1854. He was Postmaster, Morris County Judge and Justice of Peace and a member of the New Jersey Assembly. Dr. George H. Foster purchased the house in 1885. The house was willed to the borough in 1939 for use as a library and museum.

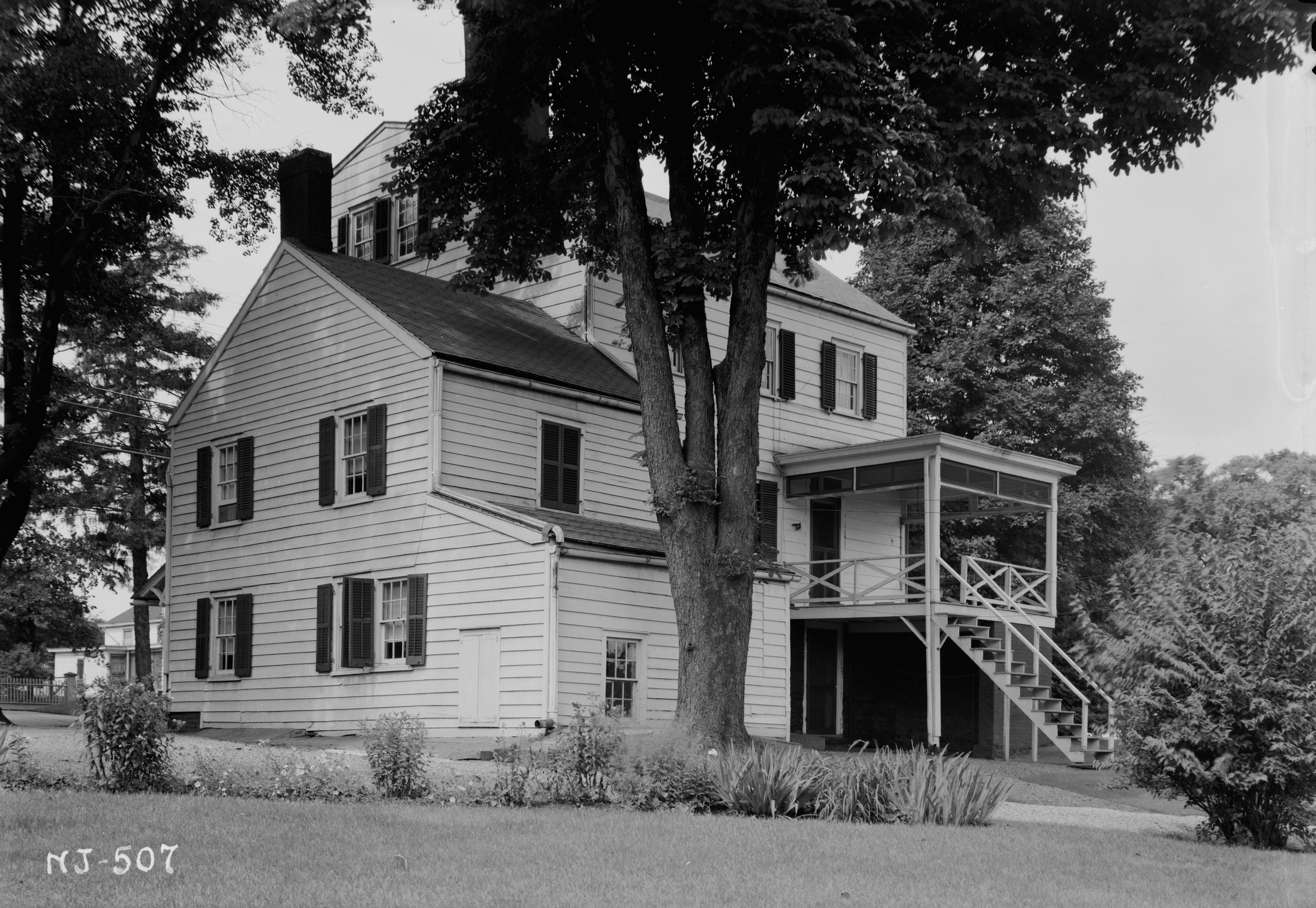
HABS photo from 1938

== See also ==
- National Register of Historic Places listings in Morris County, New Jersey
