= Raymond T. Odierno =

US Army general (1954–2021)

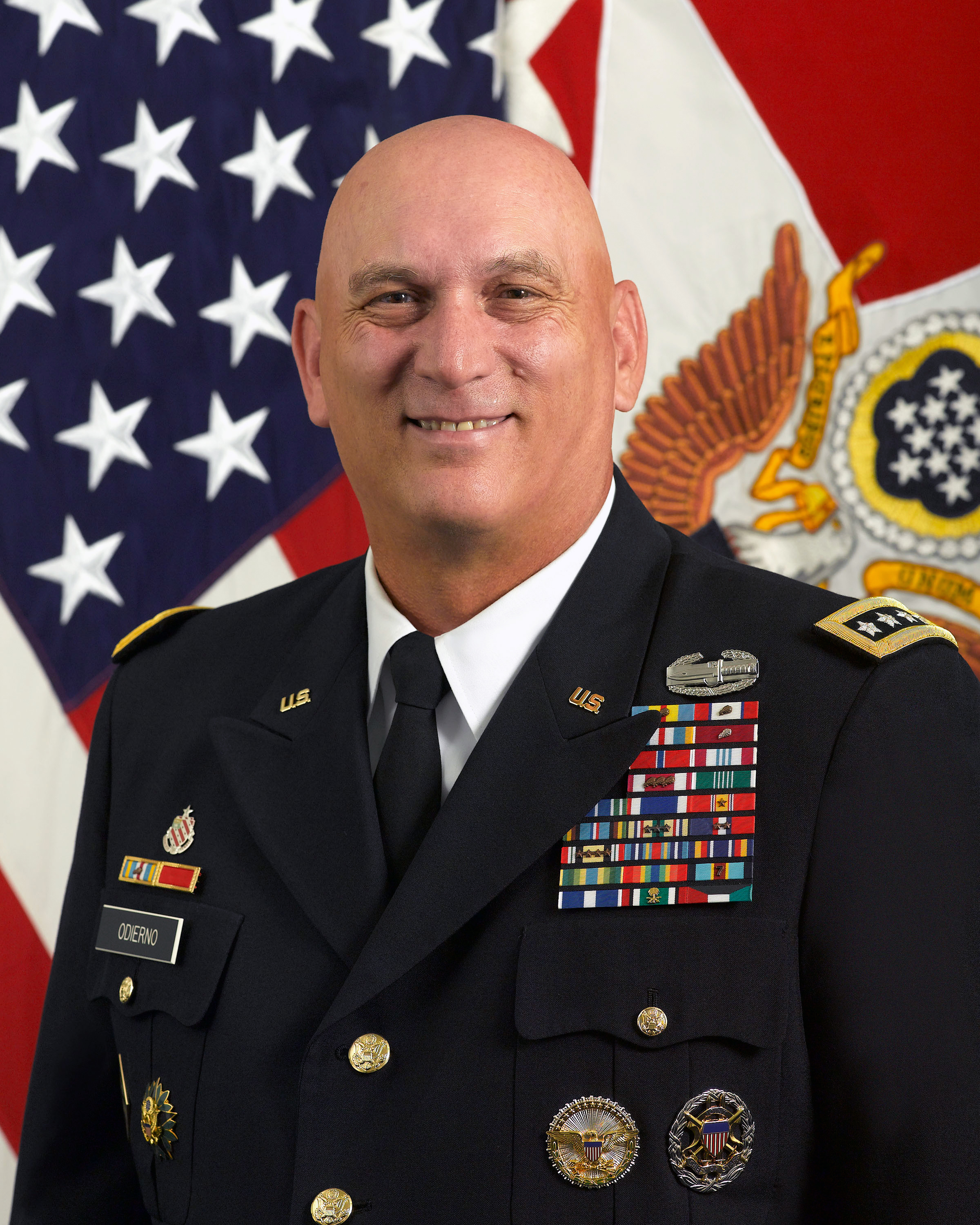
- Odierno in 2012 as Chief of Staff of the Army
- Born: 8 September 1954; Rockaway, New Jersey, U.S.
- Died: 8 October 2021 (aged 67); Pinehurst, North Carolina, U.S.
- Burial place: Arlington National Cemetery
- Alma mater: United States Military Academy (BS); North Carolina State University (MS); Naval War College (MA)
- Spouse: Linda
- Military career
- Allegiance: United States
- Branch: United States Army
- Service years: 1976–2015
- Rank: General
- Nicknames: Ray; General O
- Commands: Chief of Staff of the United States Army; United States Joint Forces Command; United States Forces – Iraq; Multi-National Force – Iraq; Multi-National Corps – Iraq; III Corps; 4th Infantry Division; 1st Cavalry Division Artillery; 2nd Battalion, 8th Field Artillery Regiment
- Conflicts: Gulf War; Iraq War
- Awards: Defense Distinguished Service Medal (5); Army Distinguished Service Medal (2); Defense Superior Service Medal; Legion of Merit (6); Bronze Star Medal

Raymond Thomas Odierno /oʊdiˈɛərnoʊ/ (8 September 1954 – 8 October 2021) was an American military officer who served as a four-star general of the United States Army and as the 38th chief of staff of the Army. Prior to his service as chief of staff, Odierno commanded United States Joint Forces Command from October 2010 until its disestablishment in August 2011. He served as Commanding General, United States Forces – Iraq and its predecessor, Multi-National Force – Iraq, from September 2008 to September 2010.

== Early life and education ==
Raymond Thomas Odierno, of Italian descent, was born on 8 September 1954 in Dover, New Jersey, the son of Helen and Raymond J. Odierno. He grew up in Rockaway, New Jersey, and attended Morris Hills High School, graduating in 1972.

He attended the United States Military Academy at West Point, where he graduated in June 1976 with a Bachelor of Science degree. He later received a Master of Science degree in nuclear effects engineering from North Carolina State University and a Master of Arts degree in national security and strategy from the Naval War College.

== Career ==
In 1976, Odierno was commissioned as an officer upon his graduation from West Point. Over his career, he was stationed in Germany, Saudi Arabia, the Balkans, and the US.

=== Iraq War ===
Odierno served three tours in Iraq between 2003 and 2010. He commanded the 4th Infantry Division during the 2003 US-led invasion of Iraq, with headquarters at Tikrit. According to Thomas E. Ricks, the Division employed aggressive tactics under his leadership; according to a 2008 profile of Odierno in The Guardian, the Division followed an "iron-fist strategy" under his command. Odierno replaced Peter W. Chiarelli as commander of Multi-National Corps – Iraq in 2006.

As commander, Odierno promoted the Iraq War troop surge of 2007 as an alternative to the then-prevailing military strategy. His tactics as commander were less "confrontational" than those he had employed as commander of the 4th Infantry Division. Odierno oversaw the surge from December 2006 to March 2008.

In September 2008, Odierno took over from David Petraeus as commander of US forces in Iraq. According to then-Secretary of Defense Robert Gates, Odierno's experience as commander during the surge suited him to succeed Petraeus. Later in 2008, Odierno announced a "subtle shift" in US military operations in Iraq, whereby the United States would seek the approval of Iraq's government before engaging in combat.

=== Army leadership ===
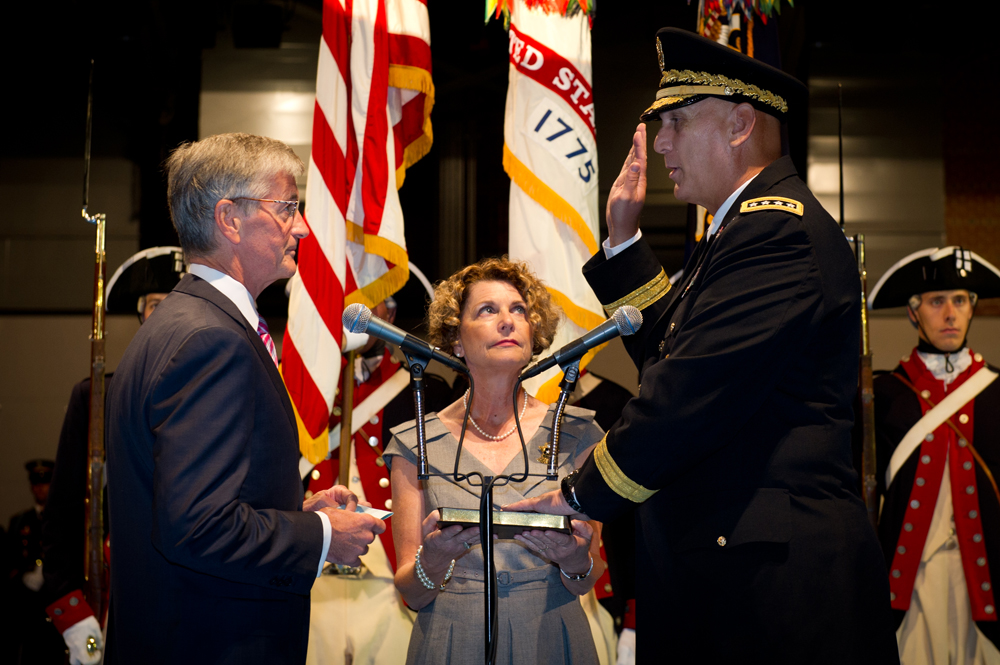
Odierno is sworn in as Army chief of staff by Secretary of the Army John M. McHugh at Joint Base Myer-Henderson Hall, 7 September 2011.

On 30 May 2011, Odierno was nominated to be Army Chief of Staff. He was confirmed to take over from General Martin E. Dempsey on 7 September 2011, and sworn in as 38th Army chief of staff later that day. In 2013, Odierno issued an order restoring the original, shortened lyrics of the U.S. Army anthem "The Army Goes Rolling Along."

In 2014, Odierno submitted a budget request for 520,000 active-duty soldiers. He said that the bare minimum was 450,000, which would be at a "high risk to meet one major war". As chief of staff, Odierno said in a 2015 interview with The Daily Telegraph that he was "very concerned" about a decline in the United Kingdom's military spending. In August 2015, Odierno retired from the Army after 39 years of service.

=== Post-military activities ===
In January 2017, Odierno was named chairman of USA Football, a national organization that promotes youth football. He was named chairman and alternate governor of the National Hockey League's Florida Panthers on 12 October 2017. In January 2019, he was selected to serve a three-year term on the College Football Playoff selection committee. In July 2021, he was selected as a member of the board of trustees at North Carolina State University.

== Assignments ==
=== Promotions ===
United States Military Academy – Class of 1976

Insignia	Rank	Date of rank
	Second lieutenant	2 June 1976
	First lieutenant	2 June 1978
	Captain	1 August 1980
	Major	1 December 1986
	Lieutenant colonel	1 February 1992
	Colonel	1 September 1995
	Brigadier general	1 July 1999
	Major general	1 November 2002
	Lieutenant general	1 January 2005
	General	16 September 2008

=== Officer assignments ===
From	To	Assignments
Oct 1976	Jan 1978	Support Platoon Leader, later Firing Platoon Leader, C Battery, 1st Battalion, 41st Field Artillery Regiment, 56th Field Artillery Brigade, United States Army Europe and Seventh Army, Germany
Jan 1978	Oct 1979	Survey Officer, 1st Battalion, 41st Field Artillery Regiment, 56th Field Artillery Brigade, United States Army Europe and Seventh Army, Germany
Nov 1979	Jul 1980	Student, Field Artillery Advanced Course, Fort Sill, Oklahoma
Aug 1980	Dec 1980	Liaison Officer, 1st Battalion, 73rd Field Artillery Regiment, XVIII Airborne Corps, Fort Bragg, North Carolina
Dec 1980	Dec 1982	Commander, Service Battery, later A Battery, 1st Battalion, 73rd Field Artillery Regiment, XVIII Airborne Corps, Fort Bragg, North Carolina
Dec 1982	May 1983	Assistant S-3 (Operations), 1st Battalion, 73d Field Artillery Regiment, XVIII Airborne Corps, Fort Bragg, North Carolina
Jun 1983	May 1984	S-3 (Operations), 3rd Battalion, 8th Field Artillery Regiment, XVIII Airborne Corps, Fort Bragg, North Carolina
Jun 1984	Aug 1986	Student, North Carolina State University, Raleigh, North Carolina
Sep 1986	Jun 1989	Nuclear Research Officer, later Chief, Acquisition Support Division, Defense Nuclear Agency, Alexandria, Virginia, later detailed as Military Advisor for Arms Control, Office of the Secretary of Defense, Washington, DC
Jun 1989	Jun 1990	Student, United States Naval Command and Staff Course, Newport, Rhode Island
Jul 1990	Dec 1990	Executive Officer, 2nd Battalion, 3rd Field Artillery Regiment, 3rd Armored Division, United States Army Europe and Seventh Army, Germany
Dec 1990	Jun 1991	Executive Officer, Division Artillery, 3rd Armored Division, United States Army Europe and Seventh Army, Germany. Operation Desert Shield and Operation Desert Storm, Saudi Arabia
Jun 1991	May 1992	Executive Officer, 42nd Field Artillery Brigade, V Corps, United States Army Europe and Seventh Army, Germany
Jun 1992	Jun 1994	Commander, 2nd Battalion, 8th Field Artillery Regiment, 7th Infantry Division (Light), Fort Ord, California (relocated to Fort Lewis, Washington)
Jun 1994	Jun 1995	Student, United States Army War College, Carlisle Barracks, Pennsylvania
Jun 1995	Jun 1997	Commander, Division Artillery, 1st Cavalry Division, Fort Hood, Texas
Jun 1997	Aug 1998	Chief of Staff, V Corps, United States Army Europe and Seventh Army, Germany
Aug 1998	Jul 1999	Assistant Division Commander (Support), 1st Armored Division, United States Army Europe and Seventh Army, Germany to include duty as Deputy Commanding General for Ground Operations, Task Force Hawk, Operation Allied Force, Albania
Jul 1999	Jul 2001	Director, Force Management, Office of the Deputy Chief of Staff for Operations and Plans, United States Army, Washington, DC
Oct 2001	Aug 2004	Commanding General, 4th Infantry Division (Mechanized), Fort Hood, Texas. Operation Iraqi Freedom, Iraq
Aug 2004	Oct 2004	Special Assistant to Vice Chief of Staff, United States Army, Washington, DC
Oct 2004	May 2006	Assistant to the Chairman of the Joint Chiefs of Staff, Office of the Joint Chiefs of Staff, Washington, DC
May 2006	Dec 2006	Commanding General, III Corps and Fort Hood, Fort Hood, Texas
Dec 2006	Feb 2008	Commanding General, III Corps and Commander, Multi-National Corps-Iraq, Operation Iraqi Freedom, Iraq
Feb 2008	Sep 2008	Commanding General, III Corps and Fort Hood, Fort Hood, Texas
Sep 2008	31 December 2009	Commander, Multi-National Force – Iraq, Operation Iraqi Freedom, Iraq
1 January 2010	1 September 2010	Commander, United States Forces – Iraq, Operation Iraqi Freedom, Iraq
29 October 2010	Aug 2011	Commander, United States Joint Forces Command, Norfolk, Virginia
7 September 2011	14 August 2015	Chief of Staff of the United States Army

== Awards and honors ==
General Odierno has received the following awards:

Combat Action Badge
Joint Chiefs of Staff Identification Badge
Office of the Secretary of Defense Identification Badge
Army Staff Identification Badge
4th Infantry Division Combat Service Identification Badge
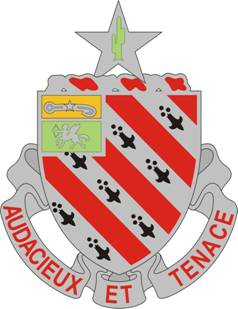
8th Field Artillery Regiment Distinctive Unit Insignia
7 Overseas Service Bars

Defense Distinguished Service Medal with 4 oak leaf clusters
Army Distinguished Service Medal with oak leaf cluster
Defense Superior Service Medal
Legion of Merit with silver oak leaf cluster
Bronze Star Medal
Defense Meritorious Service Medal
Meritorious Service Medal with three oak leaf clusters
Army Commendation Medal with four oak leaf clusters
Army Achievement Medal
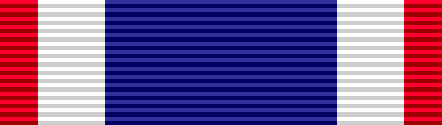
Secretary's Distinguished Service Award
National Defense Service Medal with one bronze service star
Armed Forces Expeditionary Medal
Southwest Asia Service Medal with 3 bronze campaign stars
Kosovo Campaign Medal with 2 bronze campaign stars
Iraq Campaign Medal with four bronze campaign stars
|Global War on Terrorism Expeditionary Medal
Global War on Terrorism Service Medal
Armed Forces Service Medal
Army Service Ribbon
Army Overseas Service Ribbon (with award numeral 7)
NATO Kosovo Medal
Kuwait Liberation Medal (Saudi Arabia)
Kuwait Liberation Medal (Kuwait)

Odierno received the Naval War College Distinguished Graduate Leadership Award in 2009. In 2012, Odierno received the Ellis Island Medals of Honor.

== Personal life ==
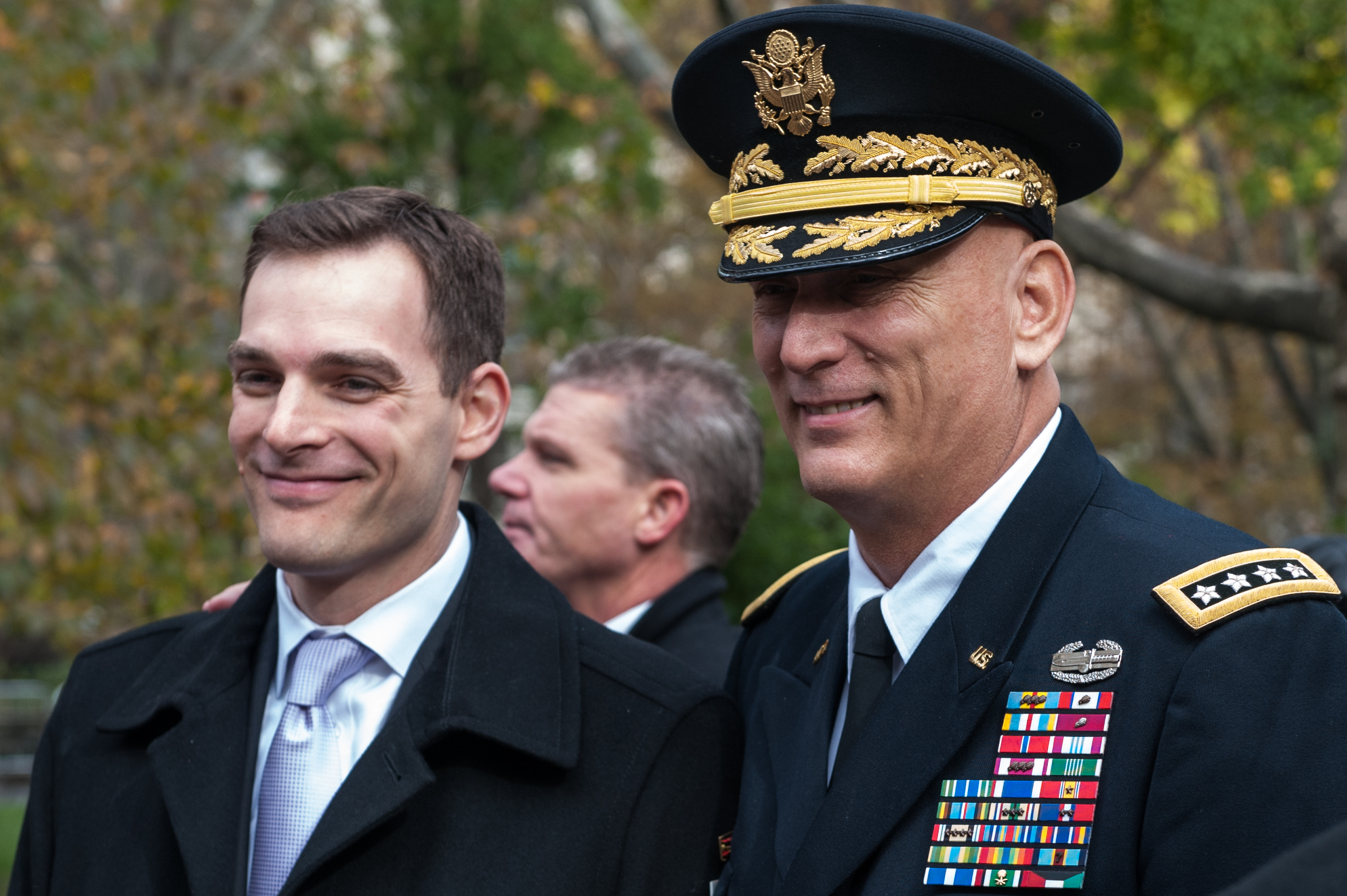
Odierno (right) with son Anthony K. Odierno during the opening ceremony of the Veterans Day Parade in New York 2013

Odierno and his wife had three children and four grandchildren. His son, retired U.S. Army Captain Anthony K. Odierno, is an Iraq War veteran who lost his left arm to a rocket-propelled grenade.

Odierno died on 8 October 2021, from cancer at the age of 67. In January 2022, funeral services were held privately followed by interment at Arlington National Cemetery.

== Sources ==
- Gordon, Michael R.; Trainor, Bernard E. (2013). The Endgame: The Inside Story of the Struggle for Iraq, from George W. Bush to Barack Obama. New York: Vintage Books. ISBN 978-0-307-38894-0. OCLC 819383400.
- Odierna; Agostino (2020). "Gli Odierna tra l'Ottocento e il Novecento". In Franco, Alfredo; De Martino, Francesco; Odierna, Agostino (eds.). Studi Storici Sarnesi 2. Torre del Greco: ESA Edizioni Scientifiche e Artistiche. pp. 355–384. ISBN 9788899472474.

Military offices
Preceded by Peter Chiarelli	Commanding General of the Multinational Corps-Iraq; 2006–2008	Succeeded by Lloyd Austin
Preceded by David Petraeus	Commanding General of the Multinational Force-Iraq; 2008–2010	Position abolished
New office	Commanding General of the United States Forces-Iraq; 2010	Succeeded by Lloyd Austin
Preceded by Keith Huber; Acting	Commander of United States Joint Forces Command; 2010–2011	Position abolished
Preceded by Martin Dempsey	Chief of Staff of the Army; 2011–2015	Succeeded by Mark A. Milley
