= White Meadow Lake, New Jersey =

Populated place in Morris County, New Jersey, US

- Census-designated place
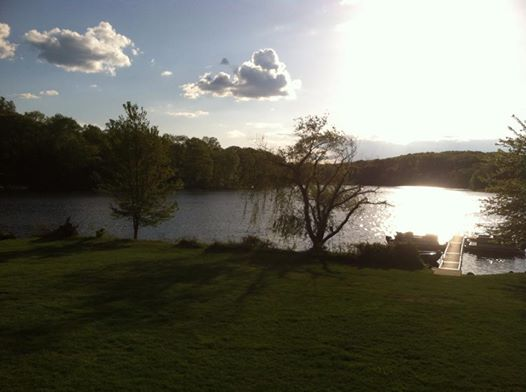
- White Meadow Lake at sunset, taken from clubhouse deck

- Location in Morris County and the state of New Jersey

- Location in Morris County Location in New Jersey Location in the United States
- Coordinates: 40.928477°N 74.516762°W
- Country: United States
- State: New Jersey
- County: Morris
- Township: Rockaway

Area
  - Total: 4.07 sq mi (10.55 km^{2})
  - Land: 3.61 sq mi (9.34 km^{2})
  - Water: 0.47 sq mi (1.22 km^{2}) 10.92%
- Elevation: 750 ft (230 m)

Population (2020)
  - Total: 8,710
  - Density: 2,416.6/sq mi (933.04/km^{2})
- Time zone: UTC−05:00 (EST)
  - Summer (DST): UTC−04:00 (EDT)
- ZIP Code: 07866 (Rockaway)
- Area codes: 862/973
- FIPS code: 34-80750
- GNIS feature ID: 02390507
- Website: www.whitemeadowlake.org

White Meadow Lake is an unincorporated community and census-designated place (CDP) in Rockaway Township, Morris County, New Jersey, United States. As of the 2020 census, the CDP's population was 8,710.

== Geography ==
White Meadow Lake is in north-central Morris County, in southern Rockaway Township. It is bordered to the south by the borough of Rockaway and to the southeast by Denville Township. It is bordered in all other directions by other areas within Rockaway Township, including Hibernia to the north and Mount Hope to the west. Interstate 80 passes through the southern part of the White Meadow Lake CDP, with access from Exit 37 (Green Pond Road). I-80 leads east 8 miles (13 km) to Parsippany and west 11 miles (18 km) to Netcong. New York City is 35 miles (56 km) to the east.

According to the U.S. Census Bureau, the White Meadow Lake CDP has an area of 4.07 square miles (10.54 km^{2}), including 3.60 square miles (9.32 km^{2}) of land and 0.47 square miles (1.22 km^{2}) of water (11.54%). The lake for which the community is named lies in the west-central part of it and drains to the east via White Meadow Brook, part of the Rockaway River watershed flowing east toward the Passaic River.

== Demographics ==
Historical population
Census	Pop.	Note	%±
1970	8,499		—
1980	8,429		−0.8%
1990	8,002		−5.1%
2000	9,052		13.1%
2010	8,836		−2.4%
2020	8,710		−1.4%
Population sources: 1970-1980; 1950 1960 1970; 1980 1990 2000; 2010 2020

White Meadow Lake first appeared as an unincorporated community in the 1970 U.S. census; and then was listed as a census designated place in the 1980 U.S. census.

=== 2020 census ===
As of the 2020 census, White Meadow Lake had a population of 8,710. The median age was 40.8 years. 22.5% of residents were under the age of 18 and 14.5% of residents were 65 years of age or older. For every 100 females there were 94.1 males, and for every 100 females age 18 and over there were 90.4 males age 18 and over.

100.0% of residents lived in urban areas, while 0.0% lived in rural areas.

There were 3,081 households in White Meadow Lake, of which 38.0% had children under the age of 18 living in them. Of all households, 68.1% were married-couple households, 9.4% were households with a male householder and no spouse or partner present, and 17.3% were households with a female householder and no spouse or partner present. About 13.6% of all households were made up of individuals and 6.9% had someone living alone who was 65 years of age or older.

There were 3,117 housing units, of which 1.2% were vacant. The homeowner vacancy rate was 0.6% and the rental vacancy rate was 0.4%.

Racial composition as of the 2020 census
Race	Number	Percent
White	6,720	77.2%
Black or African American	253	2.9%
American Indian and Alaska Native	4	0.0%
Asian	593	6.8%
Native Hawaiian and Other Pacific Islander	8	0.1%
Some other race	301	3.5%
Two or more races	831	9.5%
Hispanic or Latino (of any race)	1,116	12.8%

=== 2010 census ===
The 2010 United States census counted 8,836 people, 3,061 households, and 2,531 families in the CDP. The population density was 2,296.9 per square mile (886.8/km^{2}). There were 3,152 housing units at an average density of 819.3 per square mile (316.3/km^{2}). The racial makeup was 89.08% (7,871) White, 1.69% (149) Black or African American, 0.03% (3) Native American, 5.89% (520) Asian, 0.05% (4) Pacific Islander, 1.45% (128) from other races, and 1.82% (161) from two or more races. Hispanic or Latino of any race were 9.19% (812) of the population

Of the 3,061 households, 41.0% had children under the age of 18; 71.3% were married couples living together; 8.4% had a female householder with no husband present and 17.3% were non-families. Of all households, 13.6% were made up of individuals and 5.2% had someone living alone who was 65 years of age or older. The average household size was 2.89 and the average family size was 3.18.

25.9% of the population were under the age of 18, 6.3% from 18 to 24, 25.8% from 25 to 44, 31.9% from 45 to 64, and 10.0% who were 65 years of age or older. The median age was 40.4 years. For every 100 females, the population had 96.5 males. For every 100 females ages 18 and older there were 93.6 males.

=== 2000 census ===
As of the 2000 census, there were 9,052 people, 3,046 households, and 2,562 families living in the CDP. The population density was 2,210.6 inhabitants per square mile (853.5/km^{2}). There were 3,119 housing units at an average density of 761.7 per square mile (294.1/km^{2}). The racial makeup of the CDP was 91.6% White, 1.61% African American, 0.1% Native American, 4.7% Asian, 0.9% from other races, and 1.1% from two or more races. Hispanic or Latino of any race were 4.7% of the population.

There were 3,046 households, out of which 45.4% had children under the age of 18 living with them, 75% were married couples living together, 7.1% had a female householder with no husband present, and 15.9% were non-families. 11.9% of all households were made up of individuals, and 3.9% had someone living alone who was 65 years of age or older. The average household size was 2.97 and the average family size was 3.25.

In the CDP, the population was spread out, with 28.7% under the age of 18, 5.3% from 18 to 24, 33.3% from 25 to 44, 24.8% from 45 to 64, and 8.0% who were 65 years of age or older. The median age was 36 years. For every 100 females, there were 98.0 males. For every 100 females age 18 and over, there were 95.1 males.

The median income for a household in the CDP was $83,708, and the median income for a family was $89,345. Males had a median income of $57,400 versus $41,057 for females. The per capita income for the CDP was $32,596. About 1.2% of families and 2.3% of the population were below the poverty line, including 3.1% of those under age 18 and 1.5% of those age 65 or over.

== Community ==
All homeowners in White Meadow Lake are members of the White Meadow Lake Property Owners Association, Inc., which owns and maintains the lake itself and its beaches, boat docks, club house and other facilities. Full membership dues (for 2025) were $900.00 per home.

Two places of worship are located within White Meadow Lake, both Jewish: the White Meadow Temple, a Conservative congregation, and a Chabad center.

Copeland Middle School, part of the Rockaway Township Public Schools, is located in White Meadow Lake, as is Stony Brook Elementary School. Elementary school students in White Meadow Lake attend either Stony Brook or Catherine A. Dwyer Elementary School. High school students attend Morris Hills High School in Rockaway Borough.
