= Wharton, New Jersey =

Borough in Morris County, New Jersey, US

- Borough
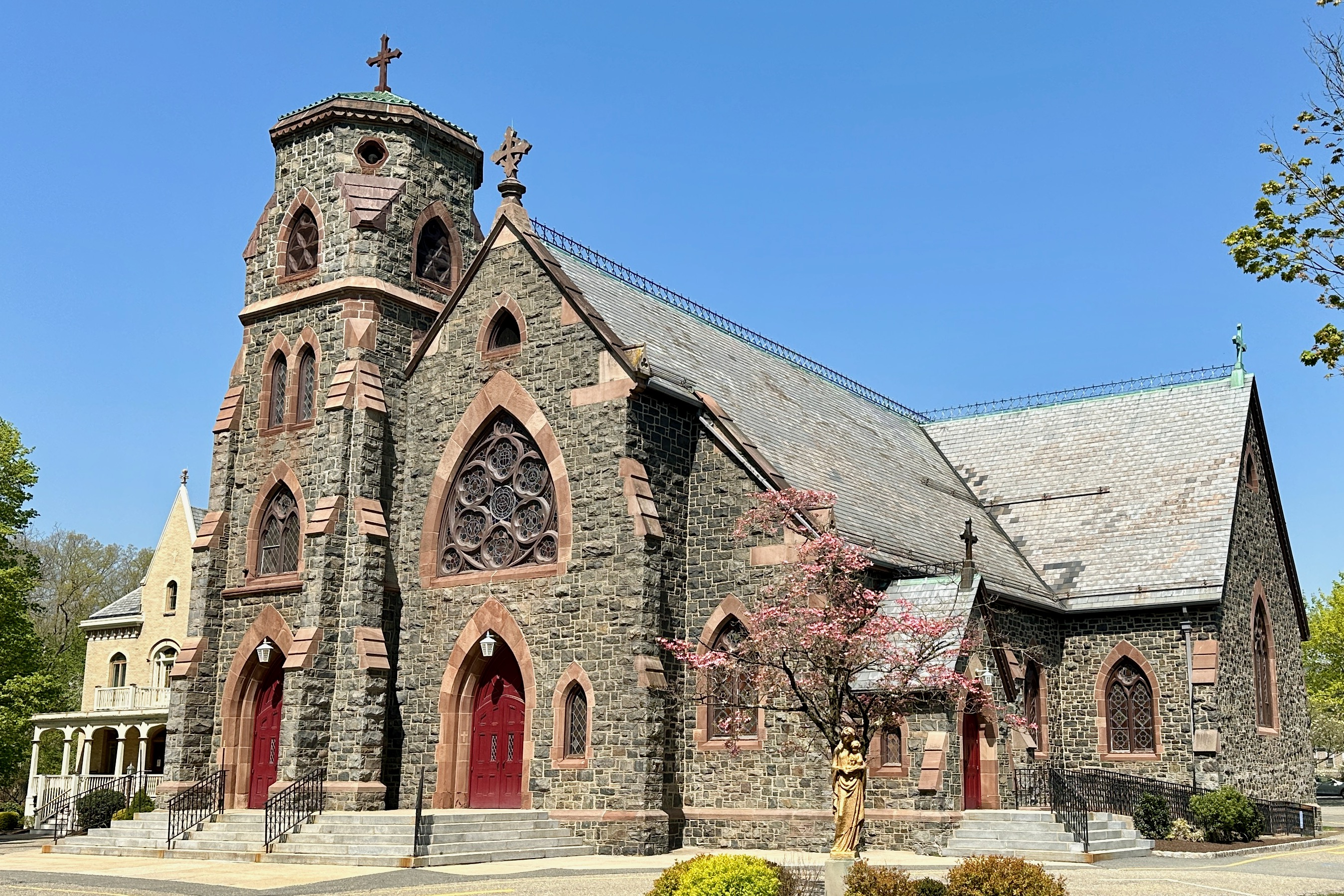
- St. Mary's Church, listed on the National Register of Historic Places

- Seal
- Motto: Tradition with Progress!
- Location in Morris County and the state of New Jersey

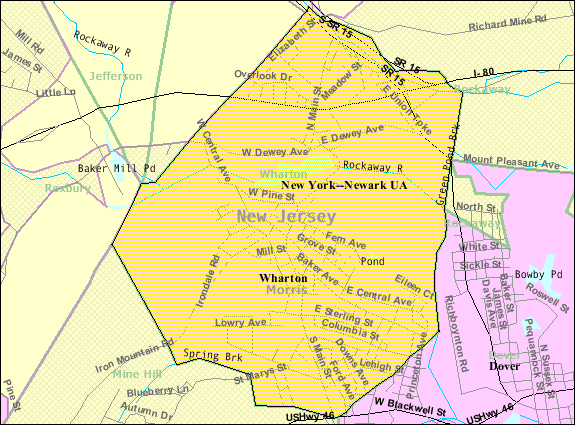
- Census Bureau map of Wharton, New Jersey

- Location in Morris County Location in New Jersey Location in the United States
- Coordinates: 40.897055°N 74.574512°W
- Country: United States
- State: New Jersey
- County: Morris
- Incorporated: June 26, 1895 as Port Oram
- Renamed: April 16, 1902 as Wharton
- Named for: Joseph Wharton

Government
  - Type: Borough
  - Body: Borough Council
  - Mayor: William J. Chegwidden (R, term ends December 31, 2026)
  - Municipal clerk: Cheryl Muzzillo

Area
  - Total: 2.14 sq mi (5.53 km^{2})
  - Land: 2.08 sq mi (5.38 km^{2})
  - Water: 0.058 sq mi (0.15 km^{2}) 2.63%
  - Rank: 399th of 565 in state 33rd of 39 in county
- Elevation: 666 ft (203 m)

Population (2020)
  - Total: 7,241
  - Estimate (2023): 7,346
  - Rank: 314th of 565 in state 26th of 39 in county
  - Density: 3,494.7/sq mi (1,349.3/km^{2})
  - Rank: 194th of 565 in state 9th of 39 in county
- Time zone: UTC−05:00 (Eastern (EST))
  - Summer (DST): UTC−04:00 (Eastern (EDT))
- ZIP Code: 07885
- Area code: 973
- FIPS code: 3402780390
- GNIS feature ID: 0885443
- Website: www.whartonnj.com

Wharton is a borough in Morris County, in the U.S. state of New Jersey. As of the 2020 United States census, the borough's population was 7,241, an increase of 719 (+11.0%) from the 2010 census count of 6,522, which in turn reflected an increase of 224 (+3.6%) from the 6,298 counted in the 2000 census.

Wharton was originally incorporated as the borough Port Oram by an act of the New Jersey Legislature on June 26, 1895, created from portions of Randolph Township and Rockaway Township, subject to the results of a referendum passed on the previous day; the name was changed to Wharton on April 16, 1902, based on a referendum held that day and subject to legislation passed on March 27, 1902. The borough was named for Joseph Wharton of the Wharton Steel Company.

== History ==
In 1831, the Morris Canal was completed from Newark to Phillipsburg, New Jersey across the Delaware River from the terminus of the Lehigh Canal. On the way, it passed through Boonton, Dover and Port Oram. On this route it tapped the Morris County ore fields and became a carrier for both ore and pig iron. Its main purpose, however, was as an extension of the Lehigh Canal to furnish a route for anthracite coal from the Pennsylvania mines to seaboard. Any local traffic was a gain to supplement the through anthracite freight and iron ore and its products soon became important sources of revenue. Sites on the canal were selected for docks and industry, including iron works.

On June 28, 1895, voters from the settlements Port Oram, Irondale, Luxemburg, Maryville and Mount Pleasant voted 143 to 51 to incorporate as the borough Port Oram, the largest of the communities in the area covering 2.25 square miles (5.8 km^{2}) west of Dover, New Jersey. A mayor, six councilmen, an assessor and a collector were elected to govern the new borough which had started life as an ore shipping port on the Morris Canal. These elected officials (mine superintendents, store owners, a railroad superintendent and a schoolteacher) represented the leaders of these settlements where iron ore was mined, smelted and shipped.

The borough was renamed in 1902 in honor of Joseph Wharton, who was born in 1826 in Philadelphia to an old family of Quakers. Wharton first studied at a local Quaker school after which he worked on a farm rather than attend college because his parents wanted him to mature, and during the winter studied chemistry at the laboratory of Martin Hans Boyè in Philadelphia. He started producing zinc and nickel, and gradually bought a controlling interest in Bethlehem Iron Works. As his business interests expanded he purchased substantial shares of several railroads involved in the coal and iron trade, also purchasing iron mines and furnaces near Port Oram. After selling his interest in Bethlehem Iron Works in 1901 and his nickel works to CVRD Inco in 1902, he continued to actively acquire and manage a large and diverse business empire that included iron smelting in Wharton until just before his death in January 1909. Wharton also endowed the Wharton School of the University of Pennsylvania. The town was named after him in a referendum in 1902.

In 1984, the long-time local bar The Heslin House and Hartley's Store were destroyed in a gas leak explosion, in which flames as high as 100 feet (30 m) destroyed several area buildings.

Wharton was one of the filming locations for Cyndi Lauper's music video "Time After Time" in 1984.

== Geography ==
According to the United States Census Bureau, the borough had a total area of 2.13 square miles (5.51 km^{2}), including 2.07 square miles (5.37 km^{2}) of land and 0.06 square miles (0.14 km^{2}) of water (2.63%).

The borough borders the Morris County municipalities of Dover, Jefferson Township, Mine Hill Township, Rockaway Township, and Roxbury.

Unincorporated communities in the borough include Irondale, Luxemburg, Maryville, Mount Pleasant and Port Oram.

As of 2026, the borough is a member of Local Leaders for Responsible Planning in order to address the borough's Mount Laurel doctrine-based housing obligations.

=== Climate ===
The climate in this area is characterized by hot, humid summers and generally mild to cool winters. According to the Köppen Climate Classification system, Wharton has a humid subtropical climate, abbreviated Cfa on climate maps.

== Demographics ==
Historical population
Census	Pop.	Note	%±
1890	775		—
1900	2,069		167.0%
1910	2,983		44.2%
1920	2,877		−3.6%
1930	3,683		28.0%
1940	3,854		4.6%
1950	3,853		0.0%
1960	5,006		29.9%
1970	5,535		10.6%
1980	5,485		−0.9%
1990	5,405		−1.5%
2000	6,298		16.5%
2010	6,522		3.6%
2020	7,241		11.0%
2023 (est.)	7,346	▲	1.5%
Population sources: 1890 1900–1920; 1900–1910 1910–1930; 1940–2000 2000; 2010 2020

=== 2020 census ===
As of the 2020 census, Wharton had a population of 7,241. The median age was 39.5 years. 19.8% of residents were under the age of 18 and 14.2% of residents were 65 years of age or older. For every 100 females there were 97.6 males, and for every 100 females age 18 and over there were 95.6 males age 18 and over.

100.0% of residents lived in urban areas, while 0.0% lived in rural areas.

There were 2,604 households in Wharton, of which 32.9% had children under the age of 18 living in them. Of all households, 47.6% were married-couple households, 18.7% were households with a male householder and no spouse or partner present, and 25.9% were households with a female householder and no spouse or partner present. About 24.9% of all households were made up of individuals and 10.2% had someone living alone who was 65 years of age or older.

There were 2,736 housing units, of which 4.8% were vacant. The homeowner vacancy rate was 0.9% and the rental vacancy rate was 5.5%.

Racial composition as of the 2020 census
Race	Number	Percent
White	3,358	46.4%
Black or African American	262	3.6%
American Indian and Alaska Native	38	0.5%
Asian	398	5.5%
Native Hawaiian and Other Pacific Islander	1	0.0%
Some other race	1,646	22.7%
Two or more races	1,538	21.2%
Hispanic or Latino (of any race)	3,576	49.4%

=== 2010 census ===
The 2010 United States census counted 6,522 people, 2,304 households, and 1,590 families in the borough. The population density was 3,039.0 per square mile (1,173.4/km^{2}). There were 2,426 housing units at an average density of 1,130.4 per square mile (436.4/km^{2}). The racial makeup was 75.85% (4,947) White, 4.57% (298) Black or African American, 0.18% (12) Native American, 5.67% (370) Asian, 0.06% (4) Pacific Islander, 9.61% (627) from other races, and 4.05% (264) from two or more races. Hispanic or Latino of any race were 40.33% (2,630) of the population.

Of the 2,304 households, 33.5% had children under the age of 18; 48.1% were married couples living together; 14.8% had a female householder with no husband present and 31.0% were non-families. Of all households, 25.0% were made up of individuals and 10.7% had someone living alone who was 65 years of age or older. The average household size was 2.83 and the average family size was 3.34.

23.9% of the population were under the age of 18, 8.4% from 18 to 24, 28.6% from 25 to 44, 27.4% from 45 to 64, and 11.7% who were 65 years of age or older. The median age was 38.2 years. For every 100 females, the population had 96.9 males. For every 100 females ages 18 and older there were 92.7 males. The Census Bureau's 2006–2010 American Community Survey showed that (in 2010 inflation-adjusted dollars) median household income was $73,571 (with a margin of error of +/− $8,504) and the median family income was $75,176 (+/− $9,601). Males had a median income of $48,750 (+/− $12,951) versus $31,105 (+/− $5,994) for females. The per capita income for the borough was $27,233 (+/− $2,723). About 6.6% of families and 6.8% of the population were below the poverty line, including 8.6% of those under age 18 and none of those age 65 or over.

=== 2000 census ===
As of the 2000 United States census there were 6,298 people, 2,328 households, and 1,599 families residing in the borough. The population density was 2,882.4 inhabitants per square mile (1,112.9/km^{2}). There were 2,394 housing units at an average density of 1,095.6 per square mile (423.0/km^{2}). The racial makeup of the borough was 82.09% White, 4.40% African American, 0.44% Native American, 3.14% Asian, 7.21% from other races, and 2.72% from two or more races. Hispanic or Latino of any race were 23.21% of the population.

There were 2,328 households, out of which 34.6% had children under the age of 18 living with them, 52.1% were married couples living together, 12.0% had a female householder with no husband present and 31.3% were non-families. 26.5% of all households were made up of individuals, and 10.4% had someone living alone who was 65 years of age or older. The average household size was 2.70 and the average family size was 3.28.

In the borough the population age was spread out, with 26.0% under the age of 18, 6.8% from 18 to 24, 34.0% from 25 to 44, 21.9% from 45 to 64, and 11.3% who were 65 years of age or older. The median age was 36 years. For every 100 females, there were 93.5 males. For every 100 females age 18 and over, there were 88.8 males.

The median income for a household in the borough was $56,580, and the median income for a family was $64,957. Males had a median income of $42,311 versus $36,016 for females. The per capita income for the borough was $25,168. About 6.4% of families and 8.3% of the population were below the poverty line, including 15.0% of those under age 18 and 4.2% of those age 65 or over.

== Parks and recreation ==
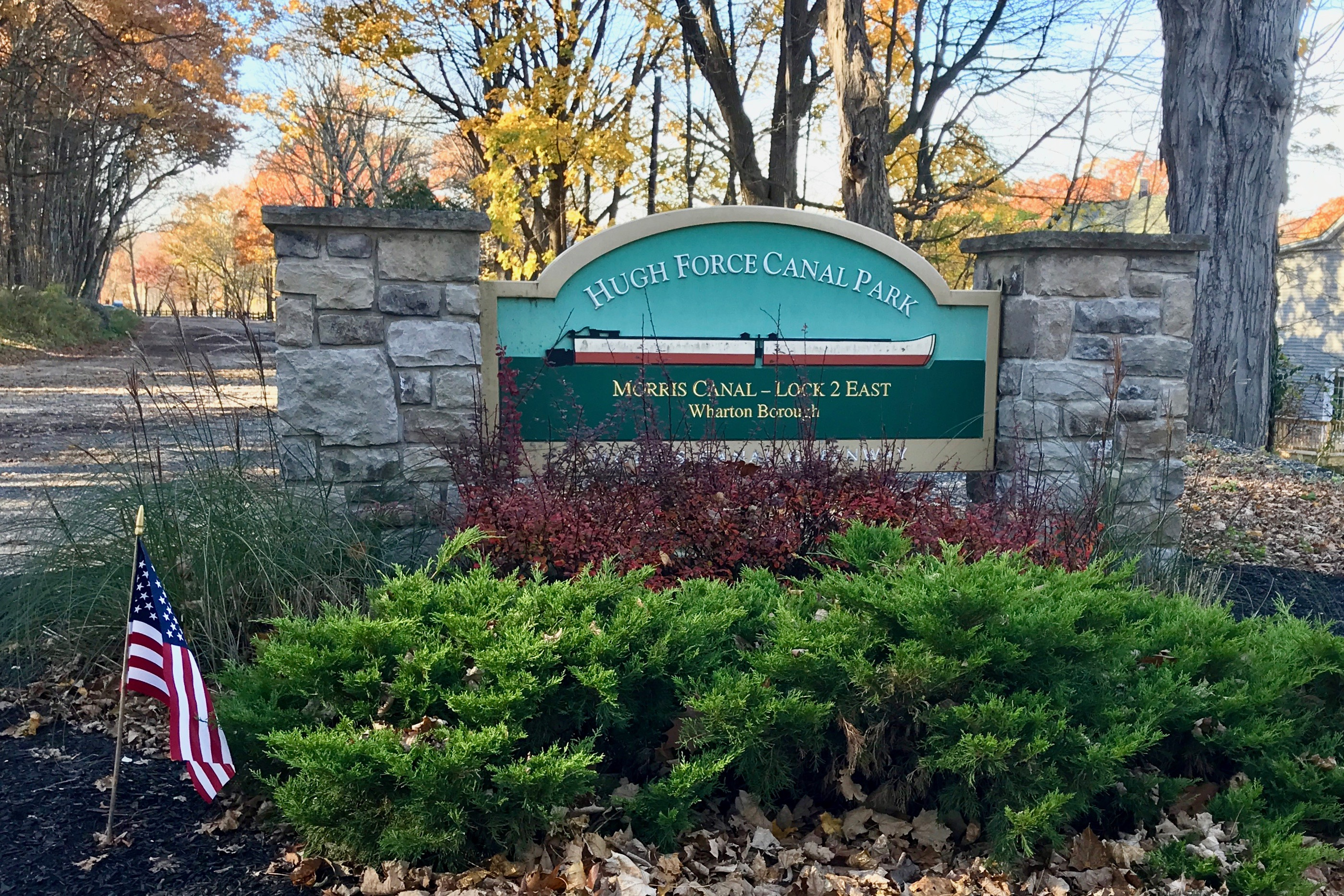
Hugh Force Canal Park

The Hugh Force Canal Park covers 9 acres (3.6 ha) and provides hiking trails along the former Morris Canal, which operated on the site until 1924, as well as abandoned railroad beds. It features Lock 2 East of the canal.

== Government ==
=== Local government ===
Wharton is governed under the borough form of New Jersey municipal government, which is used in 218 municipalities (of the 564) statewide, making it the most common form of government in New Jersey. The governing body is comprised of the mayor and the borough council, with all positions elected at-large on a partisan basis as part of the November general election. The mayor is elected directly by the voters to a four-year term of office. The borough council includes six members elected to serve three-year terms on a staggered basis, with two seats coming up for election each year in a three-year cycle. The borough form of government used by Wharton is a "weak mayor / strong council" government in which council members act as the legislative body with the mayor presiding at meetings and voting only in the event of a tie. The mayor can veto ordinances subject to an override by a two-thirds majority vote of the council. The mayor makes committee and liaison assignments for council members, and most appointments are made by the mayor with the advice and consent of the council.

As of 2026, the mayor of Wharton is Republican William J. Chegwidden, whose term of office ends December 31, 2026. Members of the Borough Council are Council President Vincent Binkoski (R, 2026), Marisa Gonzalez (D, 2028), Jennifer Hobbs (D, 2028), Ana Jones (R, 2026), Nicole Wickenheisser (R, 2027) and Thomas C. Yeager (R, 2027).

Dover serves as the lead agency operating a joint municipal court that includes Wharton and the neighboring municipalities of Mine Hill Township, Mount Arlington and Victory Gardens. Established in 2009, the joint municipal court was forecast to offer annual savings in excess of $250,000 over the 10-year life of the agreement.

=== Federal, state and county representation ===
Wharton is located in the 7th Congressional District and is part of New Jersey's 25th state legislative district.

For the 119th United States Congress, New Jersey's 7th congressional district is represented by Thomas Kean Jr. (R, Westfield). New Jersey is represented in the United States Senate by Democrats Cory Booker (Newark, term ends 2027) and Andy Kim (Moorestown, term ends 2031).

For the 2026–2027 session, the 25th legislative district of the New Jersey Legislature is represented in the State Senate by Anthony M. Bucco (R, Boonton Township) and in the General Assembly by Aura K. Dunn (R, Mendham Borough) and Marisa Sweeney (D, Morristown).

Morris County is governed by a Board of County Commissioners comprised of seven members who are elected at-large in partisan elections to three-year terms on a staggered basis, with either one or three seats up for election each year as part of the November general election. Actual day-to-day operation of departments is supervised by County Administrator Deena Leary.

As of 2026, Morris County's Commissioners (with all terms ending December 31) are Director Stephen H. Shaw (R, Mountain Lakes, 2027), Deputy Director John Krickus (R, Washington Township, 2027), Douglas Cabana (R, Boonton Township, 2028), Thomas J. Mastrangelo (R, Montville, 2028), Christine Myers (R, Harding Township, 2028), Tayfun Selen (R, Chatham Township, 2026), and Deborah Smith (R, Denville Township, 2027).

The county's constitutional officers are County Clerk Ann F. Grossi (R, Parsippany–Troy Hills, 2028), Sheriff James M. Gannon (R, Boonton Township, 2025) and Surrogate Heather Darling (R, Roxbury, 2029).

=== Politics ===
United States presidential election results for Wharton 2024 2020 2016 2012 2008 2004
Year	Republican		Democratic		Third party(ies)	
Year	No.	%	No.	%	No.	%
2024	1,441	46.94%	1,559	50.78%	70	2.28%
2020	1,369	41.93%	1,846	56.54%	50	1.53%
2016	1,239	44.25%	1,456	52.00%	105	3.75%
2012	1,006	42.99%	1,310	55.98%	24	1.03%
2008	1,202	47.19%	1,326	52.06%	19	0.75%
2004	1,334	54.63%	1,092	44.72%	16	0.66%

As of March 2011, Wharton had a total of 3,258 registered voters, of which 923 (28.3%) were registered as Democrats, 935 (28.7%) were registered as Republicans and 1,397 (42.9%) were registered as Unaffiliated. Three voters were registered as Libertarians or Greens.

In the 2012 presidential election, Democrat Barack Obama received 56.0% of the vote (1,310 cast), ahead of Republican Mitt Romney with 43.0% (1,006 votes), and other candidates with 1.0% (24 votes), among the 2,359 ballots cast by the borough's 3,455 registered voters (19 ballots were spoiled), for a turnout of 68.3%. In the 2008 presidential election, Democrat Barack Obama received 51.8% of the vote (1,326 cast), ahead of Republican John McCain with 47.0% (1,202 votes) and other candidates with 0.7% (19 votes), among the 2,559 ballots cast by the borough's 3,432 registered voters, for a turnout of 74.6%. In the 2004 presidential election, Republican George W. Bush received 54.4% of the vote (1,334 ballots cast), outpolling Democrat John Kerry with 44.6% (1,092 votes) and other candidates with 0.5% (16 votes), among the 2,451 ballots cast by the borough's 3,510 registered voters, for a turnout percentage of 69.8.

Gubernatorial election results for Wharton
Year	Republican		Democratic		Third party(ies)	
Year	No.	%	No.	%	No.	%
2025	881	38.44%	1,393	60.78%	18	0.79%
2021	884	49.64%	883	49.58%	14	0.79%
2017	761	49.35%	751	48.70%	30	1.95%
2013	892	65.93%	434	32.08%	27	2.00%
2009	848	53.40%	586	36.90%	154	9.70%
2005	676	47.21%	699	48.81%	57	3.98%

In the 2013 gubernatorial election, Republican Chris Christie received 65.9% of the vote (892 cast), ahead of Democrat Barbara Buono with 32.1% (434 votes), and other candidates with 2.0% (27 votes), among the 1,381 ballots cast by the borough's 3,449 registered voters (28 ballots were spoiled), for a turnout of 40.0%. In the 2009 gubernatorial election, Republican Chris Christie received 52.9% of the vote (848 ballots cast), ahead of Democrat Jon Corzine with 36.6% (586 votes), Independent Chris Daggett with 8.6% (137 votes) and other candidates with 1.1% (17 votes), among the 1,602 ballots cast by the borough's 3,357 registered voters, yielding a 47.7% turnout.

United States Senate election results for Wharton1
Year	Republican		Democratic		Third party(ies)	
Year	No.	%	No.	%	No.	%
2024	1,218	44.52%	1,423	52.01%	95	3.47%
2018	1,032	44.95%	1,151	50.13%	113	4.92%
2012	930	42.80%	1,214	55.87%	29	1.33%
2006	791	52.45%	675	44.76%	42	2.79%

United States Senate election results for Wharton2
Year	Republican		Democratic		Third party(ies)	
Year	No.	%	No.	%	No.	%
2020	1,277	40.18%	1,844	58.02%	57	1.79%
2014	605	48.95%	602	48.71%	29	2.35%
2013	475	53.61%	405	45.71%	6	0.68%
2008	1,030	46.67%	1,123	50.88%	54	2.45%

== Education ==
The Wharton Borough School District serves public school students in kindergarten through eighth grade.As of the 2023–24 school year, the district, comprised of two schools, had an enrollment of 767 students and 82.6 classroom teachers (on an FTE basis), for a student–teacher ratio of 9.3:1. Schools in the district (with 2023–24 enrollment data from the National Center for Education Statistics) are Marie V. Duffy Elementary School with 424 students in grades K–5 and Alfred C. MacKinnon Middle School with 264 students in grades 6–8.

Public school students in ninth through twelfth grades attend Morris Hills High School, located in Rockaway Borough, and which also serves students from Rockaway Borough and portions of Rockaway Township. As of the 2023–24 school year, the high school had an enrollment of 1,141 students and 116.3 classroom teachers (on an FTE basis), for a student–teacher ratio of 9.8:1. The high school is part of the Morris Hills Regional High School District, which also includes students from Denville Township and parts of Rockaway Township, who attend Morris Knolls High School.

== Transportation ==
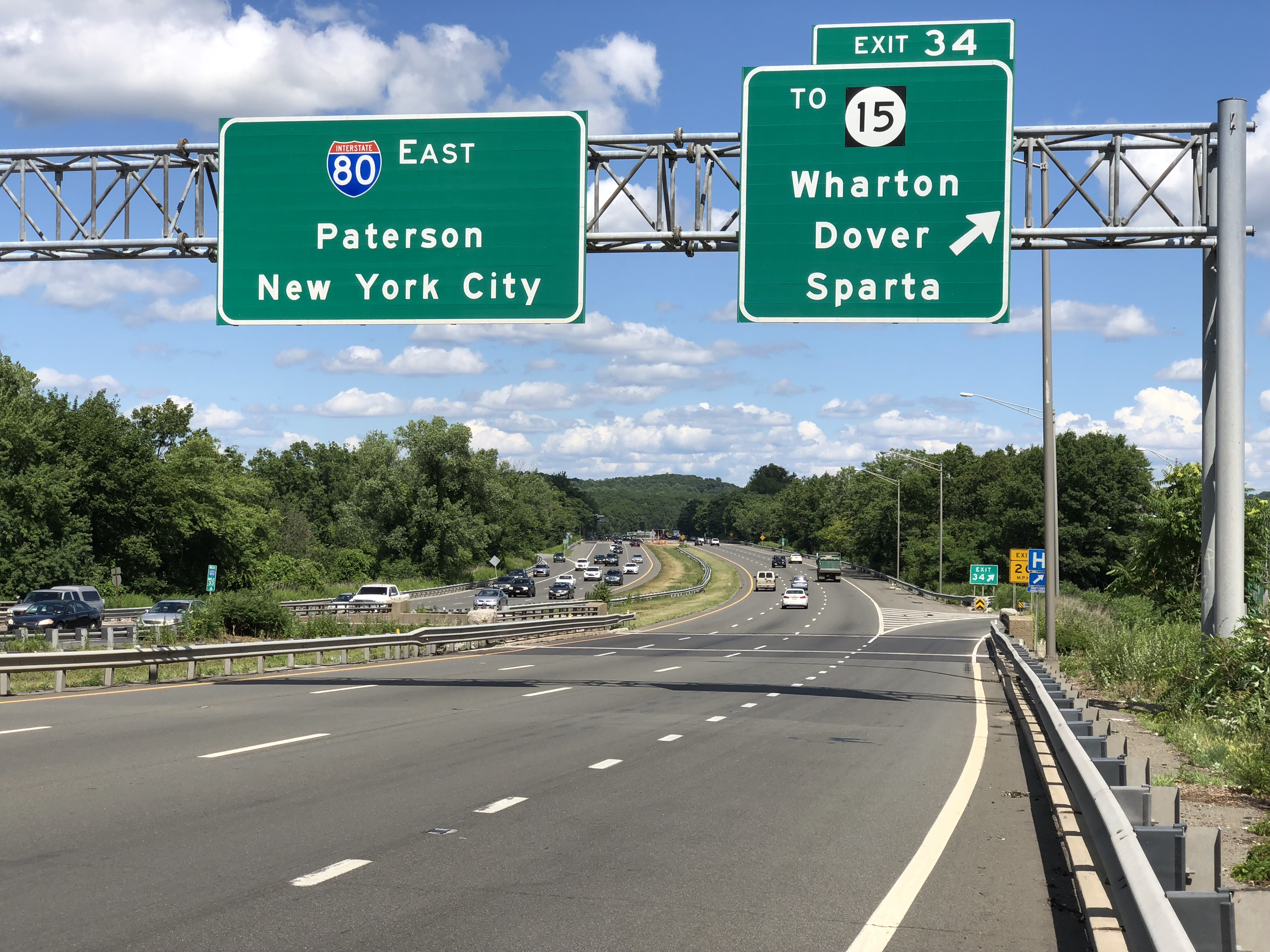
Interstate 80 eastbound at Route 15 in Wharton

=== Roads and highways ===
As of May 2010, the borough had a total of 22.12 miles (35.60 km) of roadways, of which 16.67 miles (26.83 km) were maintained by the municipality, 3.31 miles (5.33 km) by Morris County and 2.14 miles (3.44 km) by the New Jersey Department of Transportation.

Interstate 80 runs east–west for about 1.1 miles (1.8 km) and New Jersey Route 15 runs through north–south for 0.9 miles (1.4 km).

=== Public transportation ===
NJ Transit offers local bus service on the 880 route, which largely replaced the previous MCM10 route.

== Notable people ==
People who were born in, residents of, or otherwise closely associated with Wharton include:

- Kirk Alyn (1910–1999), the first on-screen Superman, lived during his youth in Wharton, the son of Hungarian immigrants
- Alan Rowe Kelly (born 1959), independent film actor, director, writer and producer, specializing in horror films
- Mayme Schweble (1874–1943), prospector and politician who served in the Nevada Assembly from 1924 to 1926
