= Rockaway, New Jersey =

Borough in Morris County, New Jersey, US

- Borough
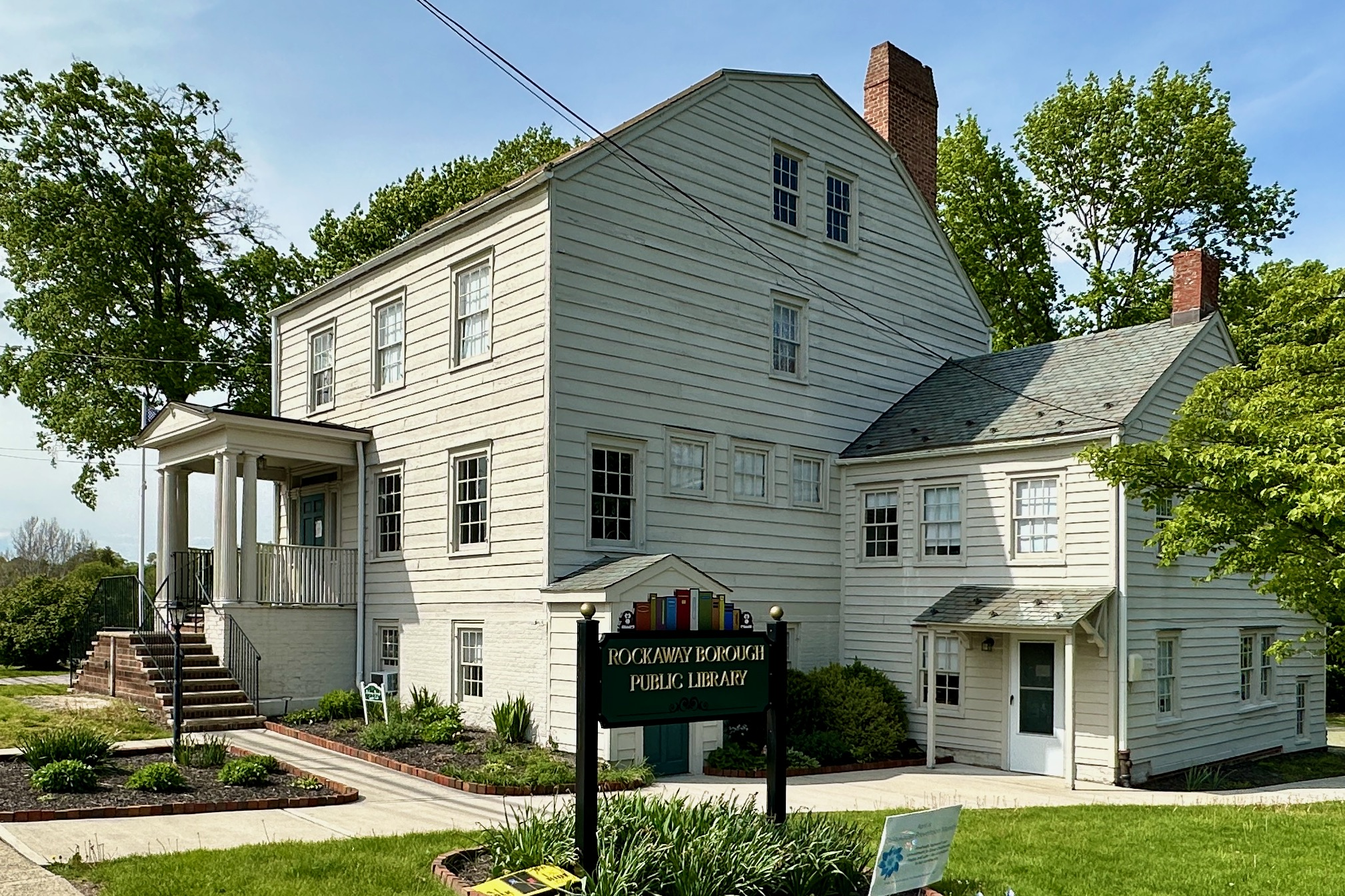
- Joseph Jackson House, the Rockaway Borough Public Library

- Seal

- Location of Rockaway in Morris County circled and highlighted in red (right). Inset map: Location of Morris County in New Jersey highlighted in orange (left).

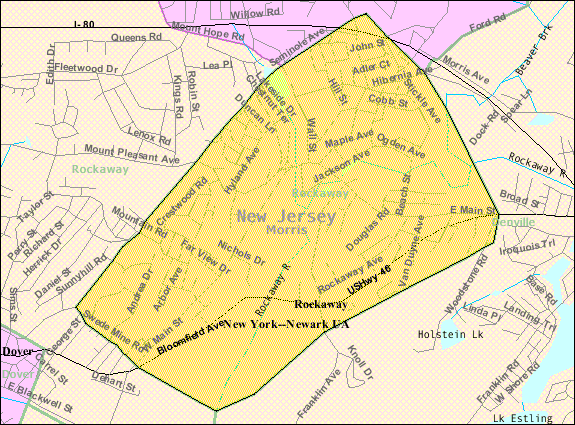
- Census Bureau map of Rockaway, New Jersey

- Location in Morris County Location in New Jersey Location in the United States
- Coordinates: 40.895853°N 74.517323°W
- Country: United States
- State: New Jersey
- County: Morris
- Incorporated: June 19, 1894

Government
  - Type: Borough
  - Body: Borough Council
  - Mayor: Thomas Mulligan (R, term ends December 31, 2027)
  - Administrator: Michael Kazimir
  - Municipal clerk: Kimberly Cuspilich

Area
  - Total: 2.12 sq mi (5.50 km^{2})
  - Land: 2.08 sq mi (5.38 km^{2})
  - Water: 0.046 sq mi (0.12 km^{2}) 2.22%
  - Rank: 400th of 565 in state 34th of 39 in county
- Elevation: 538 ft (164 m)

Population (2020)
  - Total: 6,598
  - Estimate (2023): 6,596
  - Rank: 326th of 565 in state 27th of 39 in county
  - Density: 3,181.3/sq mi (1,228.3/km^{2})
  - Rank: 210th of 565 in state 10th of 39 in county
- Time zone: UTC−05:00 (Eastern (EST))
  - Summer (DST): UTC−04:00 (Eastern (EDT))
- ZIP Code: 07866
- Area code: 973
- FIPS code: 3402764050
- GNIS feature ID: 0885374
- Website: www.rockawayborough.org

Rockaway is a borough in Morris County, in the U.S. state of New Jersey. In the 2020 United States census, the borough's population was 6,598, an increase of 160 (+2.5%) from the 2010 census count of 6,438, which was a decline of 35 (−0.5%) from the 6,473 in the 2000 census.

== History ==
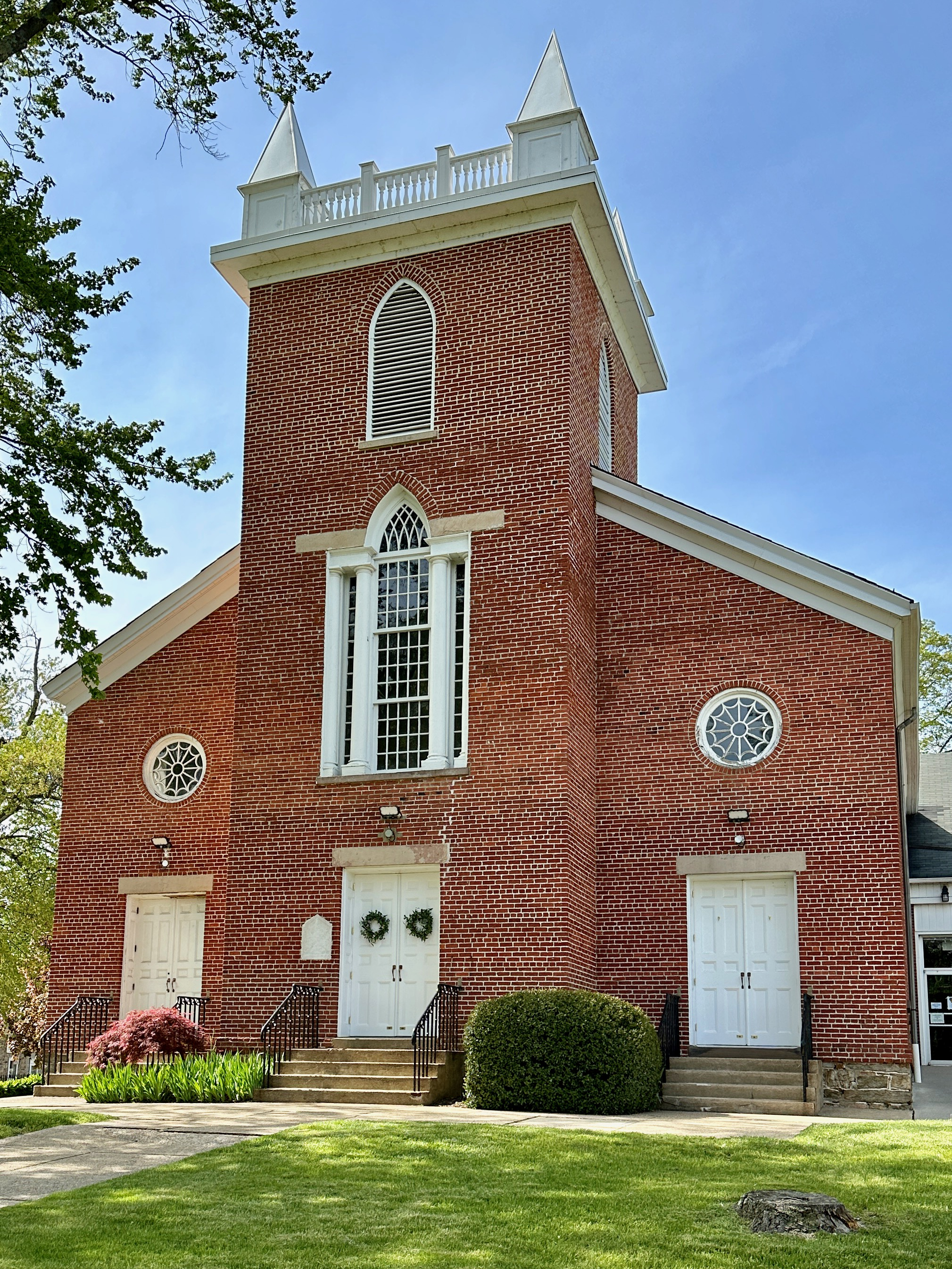
First Presbyterian Church of Rockaway, built 1832

Rockaway was formed as a borough on June 19, 1894, from portions of Rockaway Township, based on the results of a referendum held the previous day. Additional portions of Rockaway Township were annexed by the borough in 1908.

The borough shares its name with the Rockaway River and the neighboring township. The name is derived from a Native American term, variously said to mean "place of sands", "creek between two hills" or "bushy" / "difficult to cross".

The First Presbyterian Church of Rockaway was founded in 1758. Many veterans of the American Revolutionary War are buried in its cemetery. The current brick church was built in 1832.

== Geography ==
The borough has a total area of 2.12 square miles (5.49 km^{2}), including 2.07 square miles (5.37 km^{2}) of land and 0.05 square miles (0.12 km^{2}) of water (2.22%).

Rockaway borders the Morris County municipalities of Denville Township and Rockaway Township.

=== Climate ===
The climate in this area is characterized by hot, humid summers and moderately cold winters. In the Köppen climate classification system, Rockaway has a hot-summer humid continental climate, abbreviated "Dfa" on climate maps.

== Demographics ==
Historical population
Census	Pop.	Note	%±
1900	1,483		—
1910	1,902		28.3%
1920	2,655		39.6%
1930	3,132		18.0%
1940	3,514		12.2%
1950	3,812		8.5%
1960	5,413		42.0%
1970	6,383		17.9%
1980	6,852		7.3%
1990	6,243		−8.9%
2000	6,473		3.7%
2010	6,438		−0.5%
2020	6,598		2.5%
2023 (est.)	6,596	▼	0.0%
Population sources: 1900–1920; 1900–1910 1910–1930; 1940–2000 2000; 2010 2020

=== 2020 census ===
In the 2020 census, Rockaway had a population of 6,598. The median age was 42.2 years. 19.3% of residents were under the age of 18 and 16.0% of residents were 65 years of age or older. For every 100 females there were 97.8 males, and for every 100 females age 18 and over there were 96.1 males age 18 and over.

100.0% of residents lived in urban areas, while 0.0% lived in rural areas.

There were 2,561 households in Rockaway, of which 30.3% had children under the age of 18 living in them. Of all households, 49.5% were married-couple households, 18.7% were households with a male householder and no spouse or partner present, and 25.1% were households with a female householder and no spouse or partner present. About 25.9% of all households were made up of individuals and 11.0% had someone living alone who was 65 years of age or older.

There were 2,645 housing units, of which 3.2% were vacant. The homeowner vacancy rate was 0.9% and the rental vacancy rate was 4.6%.

Racial composition as of the 2020 census
Race	Number	Percent
White	4,517	68.5%
Black or African American	204	3.1%
American Indian and Alaska Native	23	0.3%
Asian	559	8.5%
Native Hawaiian and Other Pacific Islander	1	0.0%
Some other race	613	9.3%
Two or more races	681	10.3%
Hispanic or Latino (of any race)	1,355	20.5%

=== 2010 census ===
The 2010 United States census counted 6,438 people, 2,443 households, and 1,656 families in the borough. The population density was 3,106.7 per square mile (1,199.5/km^{2}). There were 2,521 housing units at an average density of 1,216.5 per square mile (469.7/km^{2}). The racial makeup was 82.79% (5,330) White, 3.22% (207) Black or African American, 0.14% (9) Native American, 7.66% (493) Asian, 0.06% (4) Pacific Islander, 4.05% (261) from other races, and 2.08% (134) from two or more races. Hispanic or Latino of any race were 15.07% (970) of the population.

Of the 2,443 households, 31.2% had children under the age of 18; 51.7% were married couples living together; 11.7% had a female householder with no husband present and 32.2% were non-families. Of all households, 24.6% were made up of individuals and 7.7% had someone living alone who was 65 years of age or older. The average household size was 2.63 and the average family size was 3.20.

22.1% of the population were under the age of 18, 7.4% from 18 to 24, 27.9% from 25 to 44, 30.4% from 45 to 64, and 12.3% who were 65 years of age or older. The median age was 40.7 years. For every 100 females, the population had 95.0 males. For every 100 females ages 18 and older there were 92.0 males.

The Census Bureau's 2006–2010 American Community Survey showed that (in 2010 inflation-adjusted dollars) median household income was $77,861 (with a margin of error of +/− $10,631) and the median family income was $108,776 (+/− $9,129). Males had a median income of $57,770 (+/− $13,090) versus $37,868 (+/− $9,230) for females. The per capita income for the borough was $37,636 (+/− $4,186). About 6.3% of families and 6.5% of the population were below the poverty line, including 12.8% of those under age 18 and 1.6% of those age 65 or over.

=== 2000 census ===
In the 2000 United States census there were 6,473 people, 2,445 households, and 1,709 families residing in the borough. The population density was 3,098.9 inhabitants per square mile (1,196.5/km^{2}). There were 2,491 housing units at an average density of 1,192.5 per square mile (460.4/km^{2}). The racial makeup of the borough was 87.75% White, 1.41% African American, 0.20% Native American, 6.36% Asian, 0.03% Pacific Islander, 2.98% from other races, and 1.27% from two or more races. Hispanic or Latino of any race were 9.39% of the population.

There were 2,445 households, out of which 33.4% had children under the age of 18 living with them, 56.3% were married couples living together, 10.4% had a female householder with no husband present, and 30.1% were non-families. 23.8% of all households were made up of individuals, and 8.1% had someone living alone who was 65 years of age or older. The average household size was 2.64 and the average family size was 3.16.

23.3% of the population was under the age of 18, 6.6% were aged from 18 to 24, 33.6% from 25 to 44, 24.7% from 45 to 64, and 11.9% who were 65 years of age or older. The median age was 38 years. For every 100 females, there were 94.7 males. For every 100 females age 18 and over, there were 91.4 males.

The median income for a household in the borough was $61,002, and the median income for a family was $66,997. Males had a median income of $44,673 versus $35,956 for females. The per capita income for the borough was $26,500. About 3.0% of families and 5.0% of the population were below the poverty line, including 6.4% of those under age 18 and 8.7% of those age 65 or over.

== Government ==
=== Local government ===
Rockaway is governed under the borough form of New Jersey municipal government, which is used in 218 municipalities of the 564 statewide, making it the most common form of government in New Jersey. The governing body is composed of the mayor and the borough council. All positions are elected at-large on a partisan basis as part of the November general election. The mayor is elected directly by the voters to a four-year term of office. The borough council includes six members elected to serve three-year terms on a staggered basis, with two seats coming up for election each year in a three-year cycle.

The borough form of government used by Rockaway is a "weak mayor / strong council" government. Council members act as the legislative body, with the mayor presiding at meetings and voting only in the event of a tie. The mayor can veto ordinances subject to an override by a two-thirds majority vote of the council. The mayor makes committee and liaison assignments for council members. Most appointments are made by the mayor with the advice and consent of the council.

As of 2026, the mayor of Rockaway is Republican Thomas Mulligan, whose term of office ends December 31, 2027. Members of the Rockaway Borough Council are Council President Melissa Burnside (R, 2026), Robert DeVito (R, 2028), Thomas J. Haynes III (R, 2027), James R. Hurley (R, 2027), Patrick McDonald (R, 2026), and Thomas Slockbower (R, 2028).

In October 2019, the borough council appointed Patrick McDonald to fill the term expiring in December 2020 that became vacant following the death of Joyce Kanigel the previous month. In January 2020, the borough council selected Melissa Burnside from a list of three candidates nominated by the Republican municipal committee to fill the seat expiring in December 2020 that became vacant when Thomas Mulligan resigned to take office as mayor.

=== Federal, state, and county representation ===
Rockaway Borough is located in the 11th Congressional District and is part of New Jersey's 25th state legislative district.

For the 119th United States Congress, New Jersey's 11th congressional district is represented by Analilia Mejia (D, Glen Ridge) who was elected in a 2026 special election to serve for the remainder of the Congress following the resignation Mikie Sherrill (D, Montclair), who was elected Governor of New Jersey in 2025. New Jersey is represented in the United States Senate by Democrats Cory Booker (Newark, term ends 2027) and Andy Kim (Moorestown, term ends 2031).

For the 2026–2027 session, the 25th legislative district of the New Jersey Legislature is represented in the State Senate by Anthony M. Bucco (R, Boonton Township) and in the General Assembly by Aura K. Dunn (R, Mendham Borough) and Marisa Sweeney (D, Morristown).

Morris County is governed by a Board of County Commissioners comprised of seven members who are elected at-large in partisan elections to three-year terms on a staggered basis, with either one or three seats up for election each year as part of the November general election. Actual day-to-day operation of departments is supervised by County Administrator Deena Leary.

As of 2026, Morris County's Commissioners (with all terms ending December 31) are Director Stephen H. Shaw (R, Mountain Lakes, 2027), Deputy Director John Krickus (R, Washington Township, 2027), Douglas Cabana (R, Boonton Township, 2028), Thomas J. Mastrangelo (R, Montville, 2028), Christine Myers (R, Harding Township, 2028), Tayfun Selen (R, Chatham Township, 2026), and Deborah Smith (R, Denville Township, 2027).

The county's constitutional officers are County Clerk Ann F. Grossi (R, Parsippany–Troy Hills, 2028), Sheriff James M. Gannon (R, Boonton Township, 2025) and Surrogate Heather Darling (R, Roxbury, 2029).

=== Politics ===
United States presidential election results for Rockaway 2024 2020 2016 2012 2008 2004
Year	Republican		Democratic		Third party(ies)	
Year	No.	%	No.	%	No.	%
2024	1,855	52.22%	1,611	45.35%	86	2.42%
2020	1,786	48.34%	1,836	49.69%	73	1.98%
2016	1,646	53.35%	1,320	42.79%	119	3.86%
2012	1,464	51.40%	1,362	47.82%	22	0.77%
2008	1,625	53.44%	1,388	45.64%	28	0.92%
2004	1,715	58.75%	1,180	40.42%	24	0.82%

In March 2011, there were 3,911 registered voters in Rockaway, of which 838 (21.4%) were registered as Democrats, 1,359 (34.7%) were registered as Republicans and 1,710 (43.7%) were registered as Unaffiliated. There were 4 voters registered as Libertarians or Greens.

In the 2012 presidential election, Republican Mitt Romney received 51.4% of the vote (1,464 cast), ahead of Democrat Barack Obama with 47.8% (1,362 votes), and other candidates with 0.8% (22 votes), among the 2,872 ballots cast by the borough's 4,103 registered voters (24 ballots were spoiled), for a turnout of 70.0%.

In the 2008 presidential election, Republican John McCain received 53.0% of the vote (1,625 cast), ahead of Democrat Barack Obama with 45.3% (1,388 votes) and other candidates with 0.9% (28 votes), among the 3,067 ballots cast by the borough's 4,007 registered voters, for a turnout of 76.5%.

In the 2004 presidential election, Republican George W. Bush received 58.6% of the vote (1,715 ballots cast), outpolling Democrat John Kerry with 40.3% (1,180 votes) and other candidates with 0.6% (24 votes), among the 2,926 ballots cast by the borough's 3,938 registered voters, for a turnout percentage of 74.3%.

Gubernatorial election results for Rockaway
Year	Republican		Democratic		Third party(ies)	
Year	No.	%	No.	%	No.	%
2025	1,352	47.37%	1,473	51.61%	29	1.02%
2021	1,241	57.27%	908	41.90%	18	0.83%
2017	991	54.96%	776	43.04%	36	2.00%
2013	1,146	69.12%	476	28.71%	36	2.17%
2009	1,188	60.80%	573	29.32%	193	9.88%
2005	957	54.10%	750	42.40%	62	3.50%

In the 2013 gubernatorial election, Republican Chris Christie received 69.1% of the vote (1,146 cast), ahead of Democrat Barbara Buono with 28.7% (476 votes), and other candidates with 2.2% (36 votes), among the 1,685 ballots cast by the borough's 4,071 registered voters (27 ballots were spoiled), for a turnout of 41.4%.

In the 2009 gubernatorial election, Republican Chris Christie received 59.9% of the vote (1,188 ballots cast), ahead of Democrat Jon Corzine with 28.9% (573 votes), Independent Chris Daggett with 8.4% (167 votes) and other candidates with 1.3% (26 votes), among the 1,984 ballots cast by the borough's 3,962 registered voters, yielding a 50.1% turnout.

United States Senate election results for Rockaway1
Year	Republican		Democratic		Third party(ies)	
Year	No.	%	No.	%	No.	%
2024	1,672	51.18%	1,500	45.91%	95	2.91%
2018	1,376	53.98%	1,068	41.90%	105	4.12%
2012	1,320	50.69%	1,246	47.85%	38	1.46%
2006	1,017	55.85%	759	41.68%	45	2.47%

United States Senate election results for Rockaway2
Year	Republican		Democratic		Third party(ies)	
Year	No.	%	No.	%	No.	%
2020	1,728	48.46%	1,794	50.31%	44	1.23%
2014	726	56.59%	538	41.93%	19	1.48%
2013	612	56.15%	474	43.49%	4	0.37%
2008	1,431	52.94%	1,213	44.88%	59	2.18%

== Education ==
The Rockaway Borough Public Schools serve students in pre-kindergarten to eighth grade. As of the 2024–25 school year, the district, comprised of two schools, had an enrollment of 574 students and 56.1 classroom teachers (on an FTE basis), for a student–teacher ratio of 10.2:1. Schools in the district (with 2024–25 enrollment data from the National Center for Education Statistics) are Lincoln Elementary School with 272 students in grades PreK–3 and Thomas Jefferson Middle School with 299 students in grades 4–8.

Public school students in ninth through twelfth grades attend Morris Hills High School (located in Rockaway Borough), which also serves students from Wharton and some from Rockaway Township (the White Meadow Lake section and other southern portions of the township). Morris Knolls High School serves all students from Denville (where the school is located) and most students from Rockaway Township (with the exception of White Meadow Lake and other areas in the southern part of the township). The two high schools are part of the Morris Hills Regional High School District As of the 2024–25 school year, the high school had an enrollment of 1,140 students and 117.0 classroom teachers (on an FTE basis), for a student–teacher ratio of 9.8:1.

Divine Mercy Academy, operated by the Roman Catholic Diocese of Paterson, is the only private school in Rockaway. It opened in September 2016 with the merger of the two Catholic schools in Rockaway, Sacred Heart of Jesus School and St. Cecilia School.

== Transportation ==
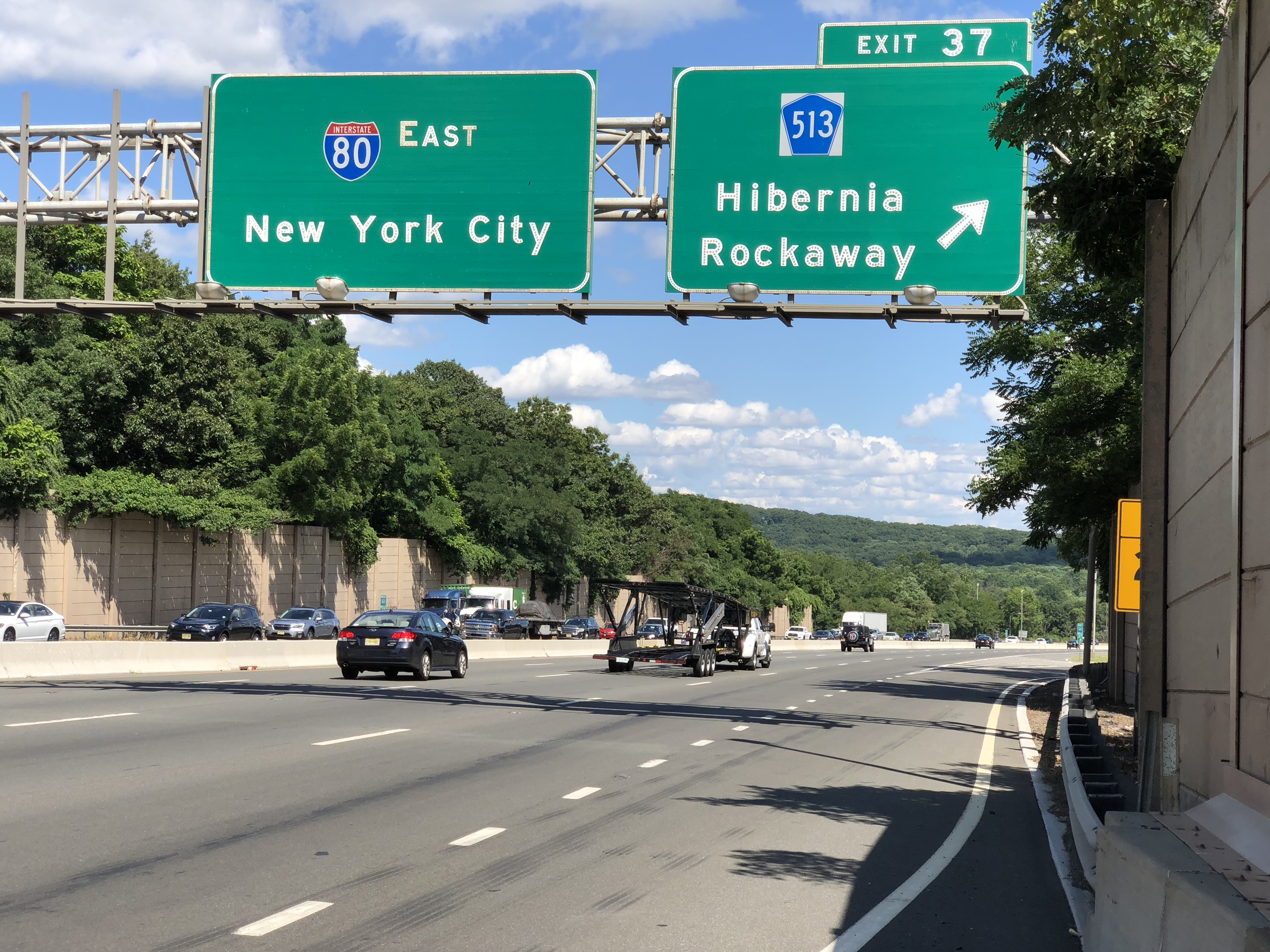
Interstate 80 eastbound at Exit 37 in Rockaway

=== Roads and highways ===
In 2015, the borough had 25.88 miles (41.65 km) of roadways, of which 20.16 miles (32.44 km) were maintained by the municipality, 3.53 miles (5.68 km) by Morris County and 2.19 miles (3.52 km) by the New Jersey Department of Transportation.

Interstate 80 clips the northeast corner of the borough. Access is provided via Exit 37 (County Route 513). U.S. Route 46 passes through the southern end of the borough.

=== Public transportation ===
NJ Transit train service does not stop in the borough, but is accessible in adjacent municipalities at Denville station and Dover station, where commuter trains are available on the Morris & Essex Lines and the Montclair-Boonton Line. The Morris and Essex Railroad and its successor the Delaware, Lackawanna, and Western Railroad formerly provided service to the town, but the Boonton Branch bypass was constructed in 1902 that provided a much shorter path to Dover, so service was cut in 1948.

NJ Transit offers local bus service on the 880 route, which replaced the MCM10 route that operated until 2010.

Lakeland Bus Lines offers bus service along Main Street to the New York City Port Authority Bus Terminal in Midtown Manhattan on its Route 46 and Route 80 lines.

== In pop culture ==
Many scenes (the train tracks, Main Street and The Mill Lane Tavern) from the 2003 movie, The Station Agent, were filmed in Rockaway. The film starred actor Peter Dinklage.

The band Houston Calls had its start here.

== Notable people ==
People who were born in, residents of, or otherwise closely associated with Rockaway include:

- Bruce Bannon (born 1951), former NFL linebacker
- Gerry Gallagher (born 1951), American football coach who was head coach of the William Paterson Pioneers football team
- Mike Lynn (1936–2012), American football executive who served as the general manager of the National Football League's Minnesota Vikings from 1975 to 1990
- Clifford Meth (born 1961), author, often refers to places in Rockaway in his stories
- Sue Naegle, business executive who was President of HBO Entertainment
- General Raymond T. Odierno (1954–2021), Chief of Staff of the United States Army and former commander of United States Forces – Iraq
- General Gustave F. Perna (born 1960), commander of United States Army Materiel Command
- Frank Joseph Rodimer (1927–2018), Roman Catholic bishop
- Rodrigo Santiago (born 1990), professional soccer player for the New Jersey Alliance
- Erik Storz (born 1975), American football linebacker who played in the NFL for the Jacksonville Jaguars
- Rachel Wainer Apter (born 1980), Associate Justice of the Supreme Court of New Jersey
- June Walker (1934–2008), Chairperson of the Conference of Presidents of Major American Jewish Organizations and a member of AIPAC's Executive Committee who was the national president of Hadassah Women's Zionist Organization of America
