= Morris Hills High School =

Public high school in Morris County, New Jersey, United States

Location
- 520 West Main Street; Rockaway, Morris County, New Jersey 07866; United States; 40.889606°N 74.527059°W

Information
- Type: Public high school
- Motto: Changing the world, one student at a time
- Established: 1953
- NCES School ID: 341074004352
- Principal: Todd Toriello
- Faculty: 117.0 FTEs
- Enrollment: 1,140 (as of 2024–25)
- Student to teacher ratio: 9.8:1
- Campus: 39 acres (16 ha)
- Colors: Scarlet and white
- Athletics conference: Northwest Jersey Athletic Conference (general); North Jersey Super Football Conference (football)
- Team name: Scarlet Knights
- Rival: Morris Knolls High School
- Newspaper: Hilltopper
- Yearbook: The Torch
- Website: mh.mhrd.org

Morris Hills High School is a comprehensive regional four-year public high school located in the borough of Rockaway, in Morris County, in the U.S. state of New Jersey, serving students in ninth through twelfth grades as one of the two secondary schools of the Morris Hills Regional High School District. The high school serves students from Wharton, Rockaway Borough and parts of Rockaway Township. Students come to Morris Hills from Copeland Middle School, Alfred C. MacKinnon Middle School, Thomas Jefferson Middle School, as well as local private schools.

As of the 2024–25 school year, the school had an enrollment of 1,140 students and 117.0 classroom teachers (on an FTE basis), for a student–teacher ratio of 9.8:1. There were 286 students (25.1% of enrollment) eligible for free lunch and 72 (6.3% of students) eligible for reduced-cost lunch.

The campus of Morris Hills houses The Academy for Mathematics, Science, and Engineering, a science-oriented magnet school operated as a joint effort with the Morris County Vocational School District and open by competitive application to all students from Morris County.

The other high school in the district is Morris Knolls High School, which serves students from Denville Township and portions of Rockaway Township.

== History ==
The school opened in September 1953 as the district's first high school. The school is located on the 39-acre (16 ha) former Gunther Estate.

== Awards and recognition ==
For the 1996–97 school year, Morris Hills High School was named a "Star School" by the New Jersey Department of Education, the highest honor that a New Jersey school can achieve.

The school was the 71st-ranked public high school in New Jersey out of 339 schools statewide in New Jersey Monthly magazine's September 2014 cover story on the state's "Top Public High Schools", using a new ranking methodology. The school had been ranked 42nd in the state of 328 schools in 2012, after being ranked 70th in 2010 out of 322 schools listed. The magazine ranked the school 106th in 2008 out of 316 schools. The school was ranked 101st in the magazine's September 2006 issue, which surveyed 316 schools across the state. Schooldigger.com ranked the school tied for 64th out of 381 public high schools statewide in its 2011 rankings (an increase of 35 positions from the 2010 ranking) which were based on the combined percentage of students classified as proficient or above proficient on the mathematics (89.6%) and language arts literacy (97.8%) components of the High School Proficiency Assessment (HSPA).

== School media ==
The Morris Hills Hilltopper, the school's official newspaper, is published four times a year in color. Students write all articles and take the majority of the photos, as well as set up the design and comics.

SEED Magazine is the school's annual literary magazine. All students are allowed to submit prose or poetry, or visual works of art (though not all are put into the actual magazine).

== Extracurricular activities ==
Morris Hills houses a large variety of extracurricular activities, a partial list of clubs include:

- Academic Decathlon (with honorable essay mention for the 2006–07 year)
- E.R.A.S.E. (Eliminate Racism and Sexism Everywhere)
- G.S.A. (Gay-Straight Alliance)
- Interact (which hosts a benefit show every year)
- DDR Society (Dance Dance Revolution)
- Chess Club
- Leo Club
- DECA
- Mock trial
- FCCLA (formerly Family, Career and Community Leaders of America)
- Ecology Club
- Peer Listening
- International Thespian Society
- DRAMA Club
- Pit Band
- Marching Band
- Jazz Band
- Chorus
- Knights Templar Choir
- Women's Choir
- Madrigals
- Model Congress
- Yearbook Club
- Technology Student Association
- FBLA
- Key Club
- Junior State of America

== Athletics ==
The Morris Hills High School Scarlet Knights compete in the Northwest Jersey Athletic Conference, which is comprised of public and private high schools in Morris, Sussex and Warren counties, and was established following a reorganization of sports leagues in Northern New Jersey by the New Jersey State Interscholastic Athletic Association (NJSIAA). The school had previously participated in the Iron Hills Conference, which included schools in Essex, Morris and Union counties. With 985 students in grades 10–12, the school was classified by the NJSIAA for the 2019–20 school year as Group III for most athletic competition purposes, which included schools with an enrollment of 761 to 1,058 students in that grade range. The football team competes in the Patriot White division of the North Jersey Super Football Conference, which includes 112 schools competing in 20 divisions, making it the nation's biggest football-only high school sports league. The school was classified by the NJSIAA as Group III North for football for 2024–2026, which included schools with 700 to 884 students.

Interscholastic sports offered at Morris Hills include baseball, basketball, bowling, cross country, fencing, field hockey, football, golf, ice hockey, lacrosse, soccer, softball, swimming, tennis, track and field, volleyball and wrestling.

The school participates in a joint ice hockey team with Morris Knolls High School as the host school / lead agency. The co-op program operates under agreements scheduled to expire at the end of the 2023–24 school year.

The boys cross country running team won the Group III state championship in 1954, 1975–1977, 2004 and 2005, and won the Group II title in 2003.

The boys track team won the Group IV spring / outdoor track state championship in 1962, in Group III in 2007 (as co-champion) and in Group II in 2012.

The baseball team won the North II Group III state sectional championship in 1966. The baseball program won 135 games in a span of six seasons with a Morris County Tournament Championship (2002), a North I Group III state sectional title (2004), and five Iron Hills Conference (Hills Division) championships (2002, 2003, 2004, 2006, 2007).

The boys fencing team was the overall state champion in 1975.

The football team won the NJSIAA North II Group III state sectional championship in 1975 and 2016. After finishing the 1974 season with a 1–8 record, the team won the 1975 North II Group III state sectional title with a 7–0 victory against Phillipsburg High School in the tournament final to finish 10-1 for the season. In 2016, the team won the North II Group III state sectional title, the program's second title and its first in 41 years, with a 27–14 win in the tournament final against Parsippany Hills High School. As a homecoming event, the Hills football team plays against Morris Knolls in an annual rivalry game played at the beginning of every school year. The teams have played each other since 1972, with Morris Knolls winning 15 of the 25 games through the 2017 season. NJ.com had the rivalry at 26th on their 2017 list "Ranking the 31 fiercest rivalries in N.J. HS football".

The boys' track team won the indoor track public state championship in Group III in 1978, and won the Group II title in 2006, 2008 and 2009. The girls team won the Group III title in 1983 (as co-champion).

The boys' wrestling team won the North II Group III state sectional title in 1987.

The 1997 softball team finished the season with a 29–2 record after winning the Group II state championship after defeating Delaware Valley Regional High School by a score of 2–1 in the tournament final.

The field hockey team won the North I Group IV state sectional championship in 2001.

The boys' track team won the Group II state indoor relay championship in 2006 and 2008.

The boys' basketball team made the state tournament for the first time in 10 years in 2006, though it lost in the first round to 6th-seeded Passaic Valley High School 67–45.

The boys' ice hockey team, established in 1958, was one of the first high school teams in New Jersey along with the Morristown School (now Morristown-Beard School), Montclair High School, Livingston High School, and West Orange High School. They won the state championship for the 1960–1961 season. They have also won seven divisional titles including two Charette Division titles (2003, 2017), four Haas Division titles (1991, 1996, 1997, 2004), and one Halverson Division title (2005).

=== Cross country / track and field ===
Perhaps the most successful athletics program at Morris Hills is its men's cross country and track and field teams, both of which have been very successful in the state, under head cross country coach Sean Robinson, who took the position in 2002. Robinson took the head indoor track and field coaching position in 2006. In that year, the Scarlet Knights won every major championship they entered (conference, county, state group and state group relay), the first time that had happened in county history. The Scarlet Knights repeated the feat in 2008, 2009 and 2011.

Robinson was coach during Morris Hills' county track and field championship victory in 2006, the first time the Scarlet Knights had won since 1977.

Since becoming head coach, Robinson has led the Scarlet Knights to six NJSIAA state championships, 11 NJSIAA Sectional Championships, two NJSIAA State Relay Championships, nine Conference Championships, and seven county titles. He also has two State Coach of the Year, 1 NFHS State Coach of the Year Honor, five Area Coach of the Year Honors, and seven Excellence in Coaching Awards under his belt. He was inducted into the NJSCA Hall of Fame in March 2015.

Morris Hills has also had over 34 All-American honors distributed to its XC/TF athletes since 1999, largely with the success of the school's 4 x mile relay, 4 x 800 relay and shuttle hurdle relay teams. At the 2009 Nike National Outdoor Track Championship the Morris Hills 4x800 won the race to secure the title of national champions after having the US#2 All-Time Performance of 7:31.60 (breaking the national record) at the Penn Relays. Keith Lindsley, the 2007 NJSIAA Athletic Assistant Coach of the Year, is the current sprint/hurdles coach. Morris Hills was selected to participate in the inaugural Nike Team National Cross Country Championship in 2005, where they finished 13th.

The following is a list of championship titles in Morris Hills cross country/track and field history.

| Type of title | # of Cross Country titles | # of Indoor Track and Field titles | # of Outdoor Track and Field titles |
|---|---|---|---|
| County | 18 | 11 | 5 |
| Sectional | 23 | 6 | 12 |
| Group | 7 | 5 | 5 |

== Marching band ==
In 1998, the Morris Hills High School Marching Band was recruited to film a commercial for that year's MTV Video Music Awards. The marching band was chosen after being spotted by MTV associates during their annual competition at Giants Stadium based on their mix of electronic music into their routines. In the commercial, the marching band played clips from nominated songs and ended in a human formation of the MTV symbol. The commercial was aired several times daily leading up to the awards ceremony.

The band was named the 2010 USSBA Group 2 Open New Jersey State Champions.

In 2016, Michael Sopko retired from his position as the band's leader. Richard Hartsuiker, a former Roxbury music teacher, replaced Sopko and bgean directing the Marching Band, directing the Concert/Jazz Bands and assisting with the Spring Musical.

== Administration ==
The school's principal is Todd Toriello. His administration team includes three assistant principals.

== Notable alumni ==
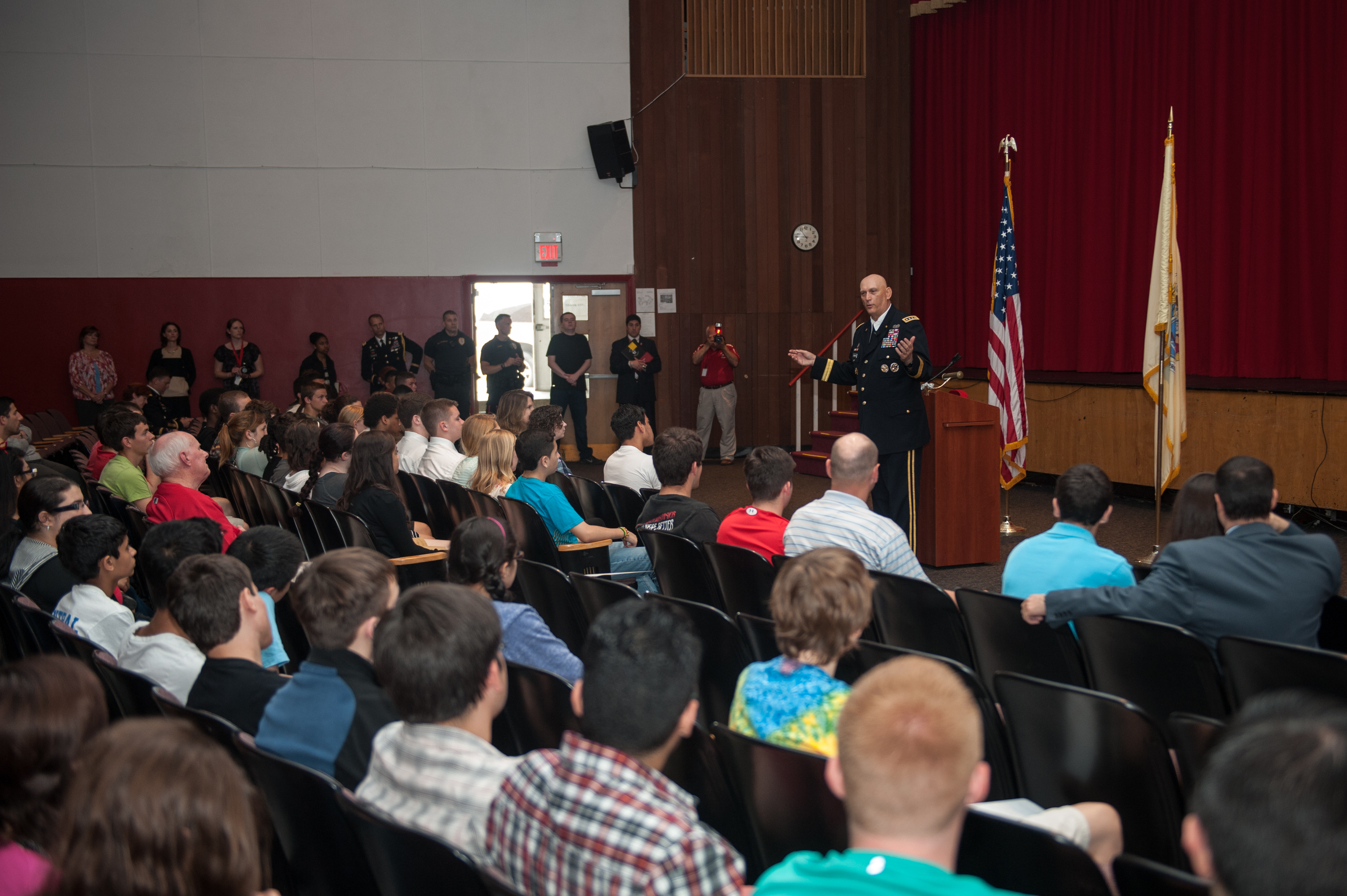
General Raymond T. Odierno (class of 1972) visiting in 2014

- Bruce Bannon (born 1951), linebacker who played for the Miami Dolphins of the National Football League
- Mike Lynn (1936–2012), American football executive who served as the general manager of the National Football League's Minnesota Vikings from 1975 to 1990
- Clifford Meth (born 1961, class of 1979), author and editor
- Sue Naegle, former president of HBO Entertainment
- Raymond T. Odierno (born 1954, class of 1972), retired four-star general of the United States Army who served as the 38th chief of staff of the Army
- Gustave F. Perna (born 1960, class of 1978), retired United States Army four-star general who last served as the chief operating officer of the federal COVID-19 response for vaccine and therapeutics
- Rodrigo Santiago (born 1990), former Division 3 and semi-professional soccer player for the New Jersey Alliance
- Rachel Wainer Apter (born 1980), lawyer who serves as Associate Justice of the Supreme Court of New Jersey
