= Morris Knolls High School =

School district in Morris County, New Jersey, US

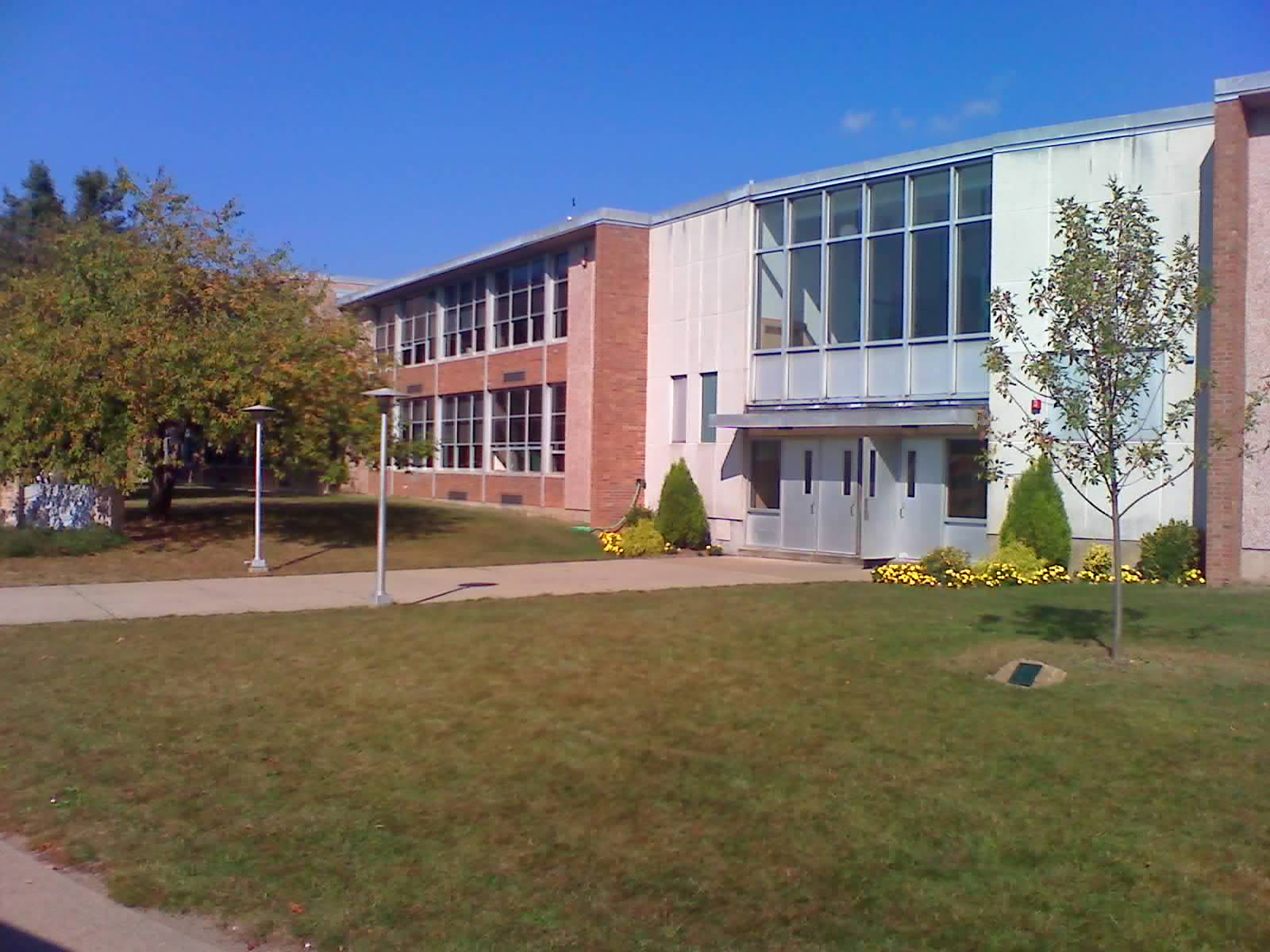
- "Home Of The Golden Eagles"

Location
- 50 Knoll Drive; Rockaway, Morris County, New Jersey 07866; United States; 40.88595°N 74.507841°W

Information
- School type: Public high school
- Opened: 1964
- Status: Open
- School district: Morris Hills Regional High School District
- CEEB code: 311321
- NCES School ID: 341074004354
- Principal: Ryan MacNaughton
- Faculty: 132.0 FTEs
- Grades: 9-12
- Enrollment: 1,450 (as of 2024–25)
- Student to teacher ratio: 11.0:1
- Hours in school day: 7
- Colors: Green and Gold
- Athletics: Varsity
- Athletics conference: Northwest Jersey Athletic Conference (general); North Jersey Super Football Conference (football)
- Team name: Golden Eagles
- Rival: Randolph, Morris Hills
- Publication: Spectrum (literary magazine)
- Newspaper: The Quill
- Yearbook: Talon
- Communities served: Rockaway Township; Rockaway; Denville
- Website: mk.mhrd.org

Morris Knolls High School (MKHS) is a four-year comprehensive public high school serving students in ninth through twelfth grades from Denville Township and most of Rockaway Township in Morris County, in the U.S. state of New Jersey, operating as one of the two secondary schools of the Morris Hills Regional High School District. The school is located in Denville but has a Rockaway mailing address. The other high school in the district is Morris Hills High School.

As of the 2024–25 school year, the school had an enrollment of 1,450 students and 132.0 classroom teachers (on an FTE basis), for a student–teacher ratio of 11.0:1. There were 173 students (11.9% of enrollment) eligible for free lunch and 45 (3.1% of students) eligible for reduced-cost lunch.

As a part of the Morris Hills Regional School District's (MHRD) magnet program, Morris Knolls was approved as an International Baccalaureate (IB) world school since 2009. IB certificate exams pass rate is 84% based on information published in 2026. The IB Diploma Program at Morris Knolls (MKIB) serves more than 80 students.

As of 2018, Morris Knolls is host to The Academy of Performing Arts, a magnet school for Morris County Vocational School District and the Morris County School of Technology (MCVTS). The Academy of Performing Arts provides three academies which consist of theater, vocal, and dance.

== Awards and recognition ==
The school was the 64th-ranked public high school in New Jersey out of 339 schools statewide in New Jersey Monthly magazine's September 2014 cover story on the state's "Top Public High Schools", using a new ranking methodology. The school had been ranked 79th in the state of 328 schools in 2012, after being ranked 79th in 2010 out of 322 schools listed. The magazine ranked the school 88th in 2008 out of 316 schools. The school was also ranked 71st in the magazine's September 2006 issue, which surveyed 316 schools across the state. Schooldigger.com ranked the school tied for 120th out of 381 public high schools statewide in its 2011 rankings (a decrease of 34 positions from the 2010 ranking) which were based on the combined percentage of students classified as proficient or above proficient on the mathematics (86.4%) and language arts literacy (94.2%) components of the High School Proficiency Assessment (HSPA).

For the 1996-97 school year, Morris Knolls High School was named a "Star School" by the New Jersey Department of Education, the highest honor awarded by the state.

== Athletics ==
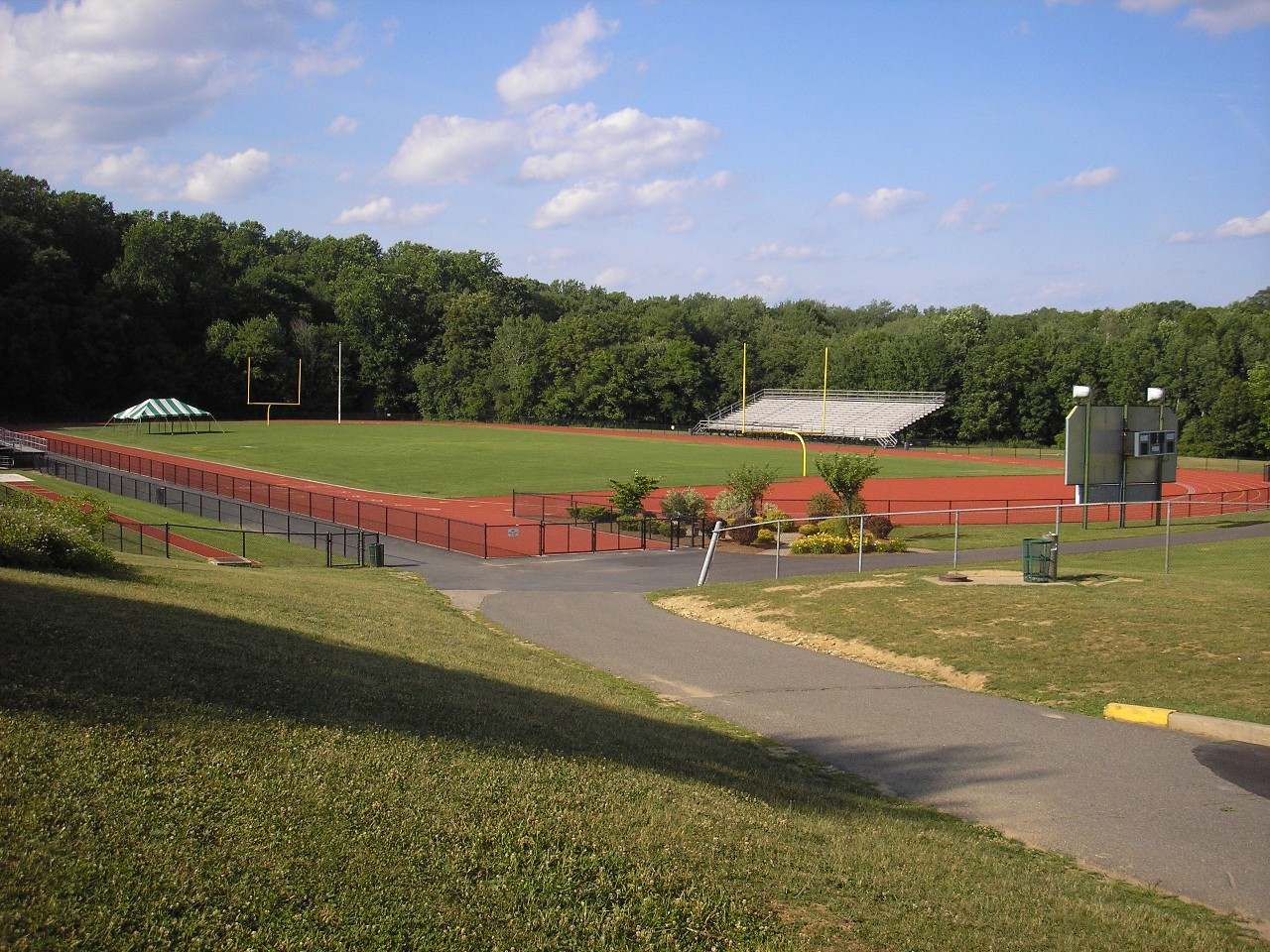
The Morris Knolls football field and track

The Morris Knolls High School Golden Eagles participate in the Northwest Jersey Athletic Conference, which is comprised of public and private high schools in Morris, Sussex and Warren counties, and was established following a reorganization of sports leagues in Northern New Jersey by the New Jersey State Interscholastic Athletic Association (NJSIAA). Prior to the NJSIAA's 2010 realignment, the school had competed in the Iron Hills Conference. With 1,100 students in grades 10-12, the school was classified by the NJSIAA for the 2019–20 school year as Group IV for most athletic competition purposes, which included schools with an enrollment of 1,060 to 5,049 students in that grade range. The football team competes in the Freedom Blue division of the North Jersey Super Football Conference, which includes 112 schools competing in 20 divisions, making it the nation's biggest football-only high school sports league. The school was classified by the NJSIAA as Group IV North for football for 2024–2026, which included schools with 893 to 1,315 students.

The boys' cross-country team won the 1966 North Jersey 2 Group II state championship. Tim Steele won the individual North Jersey 2 Group II state championship in 1967.

The school participates as the host school and lead agency in a joint ice hockey team with Morris Hills High School. The co-op program operates under agreements scheduled to expire at the end of the 2023–24 school year.

The baseball team has won the Morris County Tournament three times, tied for the fourth-most in tournament history, winning in 1973, 1988 and 1989.

The field hockey team won the North II Group IV state sectional title in 1976 and 1997, the North I Group IV title in 1999, 2000 and 2008, and won the Group IV state championship in 1997. The 1997 team finished the season with a 16-4-5 record after finishing the season by winning the Group IV title with a 1-0 overtime victory against Cherokee High School in the championship game.

The softball team won the Group IV state championship in 1980 (defeating Edison High School in the tournament final) and 2010 (vs. Eastern Regional High School). The 1980 team won the Group IV state title with a 5-4 victory against Edison in the championship game at Mercer County Park.

The football team has won state sectional championships in 1994 (North II, Group III), 1995 (North II, Group IV), 1996 (North II, Group III) and 2005 (North I, Group IV). The 1994 team finished the season with a 9-2 record after winning the North II Group III state sectional title with a 21-14 win against West Essex High School on a touchdown scored in the final minute of the championship game at Giants Stadium. The team won the North II Group III title in 1996 with a 36-20 win against Malcolm X Shabazz High School in the sectional championship game at Giants Stadium. The team went undefeated in 2005, winning every game including its defeat of Montclair High School in the North I, Group IV state sectional championship game. The team has been coached for over 40 years by Bill Regan Jr., who also works as a gym teacher. Morris Knolls has run the Houston split back Veer offense for Regan's entire tenure as a head coach. In October 2007 Regan joined his father, Bill Regan Sr., who was a coach at the nearby Delbarton School, as one of four coaches in Morris County history to attain 200 career wins. As a homecoming event, the Knolls football team plays against Morris Hills in an annual rivalry game at the beginning of every school year. The teams have played each other since 1972, with Morris Knolls winning 15 of the 25 games through the 2017 season. NJ.com listed the rivalry as 26th best in their 2007 list "Ranking the 31 fiercest rivalries in N.J. HS football".

In 1999, the football program suffered from a sophomore hazing scandal that was exposed in a several article series in the Daily Record and The Star-Ledger.

The ice hockey team won the Public School championship in 2005 and won the Public A title in 2014, 2019 and 2020 (as co-op with Morris Hills). The team also reached the state semifinals in 1996 losing to Brick Township, and again in 2007, losing to rival Randolph.

The boys' wrestling team won the North I Group IV state championship in 2006.

In 2018, the Morris Knolls boys soccer team started with a record of 0-4 and went on to win the North I Group IV state championship, and ended the season with a 17-10-1 season record. The team won their first sectional title in almost 50 years when they defeated top-ranked Montclair High School by a score of 3-2 in double overtime in the tournament final.

== Marching band ==
The Morris Knolls Marching Band is a competition ensemble that participates in the United States Scholastic Band Association (USSBA) circuit.

In 2003, 2007, 2009 and 2013, the Morris Knolls Marching Band won the USSBA Group 3 Open state championships. In 2008, the band was recognized as the all-Northeast champion.

Three years later, at the 2006 USSBA National Championships at Navy–Marine Corps Memorial Stadium in Annapolis, Maryland, Morris Knolls High School placed fourth in their group and the colorguard was recognized as Best Color Guard National Championship title in Class III.

In the 2010 season, the Morris Knolls Marching Band won second place at the USSBA National Championships with a score of 95.838 in Group 2 Open, winning the caption for Best Color Guard.

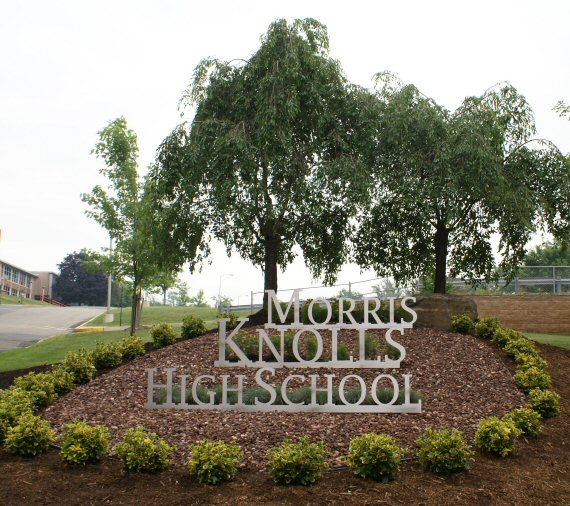
The new school sign: A project sponsored by the Student Government Association in conjunction with the Class of 2008 and the Interact Club.

== Administration ==
The school's principal is Ryan MacNaughton. His core administration team includes three assistant principals.

== Notable alumni ==
- Lou Benfatti (born 1971), former professional football player who played for the New York Jets
- Neal Casal (1968–2019), guitarist and singer-songwriter with Chris Robinson and the Black Crowes, Ryan Adams and the Cardinals, Willie Nelson, and members of the Grateful Dead
- Jermaine Eluemunor (born 1994), professional football offensive tackle for the New York Giants
- Lexie Fyfe (born 1969), professional wrestler
- Tim Jacobus (born 1959), artist best known for illustrating the covers for nearly one hundred books in R. L. Stine's Goosebumps series
- Danielle Jonas (born 1986), reality television personality, Married to Jonas
- Vickie Paynter (born 1971, class of 1989), former professional tennis player
- Laura San Giacomo (born 1962), actress, Pretty Woman and Just Shoot Me!
- Charlie Zeleny, drummer, music director, and solo artist

== Senior pranks ==
Throughout the past twenty years there have been many students who have attempted to pull a senior prank, some of which that have made local news. In 2002 a few students put three chickens in the school marked one, two, and four. This was done to keep the administration busy looking for the third chicken, but in reality it never existed. In 2007 the senior and junior class started a huge food fight which caused approximately $2,780 in damage to ceiling tiles, tables, and televisions. The class of 2009's prank made the news on News 12 New Jersey and various local newspapers after students placed a dead deer in the senior bathroom with a sign on the carcass which said 'The class of 2009, the last class to make you say Oh!'".

In 2010, after seniors from Morris Knolls released farm animals into the school's ceilings, an animal control person fell off of the ladder and tried suing the students for $1 million. All animals were safely removed from the ceilings, but the students were apprehended before classes started and brought up on charges ranging from burglary and conspiracy to animal cruelty.
