= Mount Hope Miners' Church =

Historic church in New Jersey, United States

- U.S. National Register of Historic Places
- New Jersey Register of Historic Places
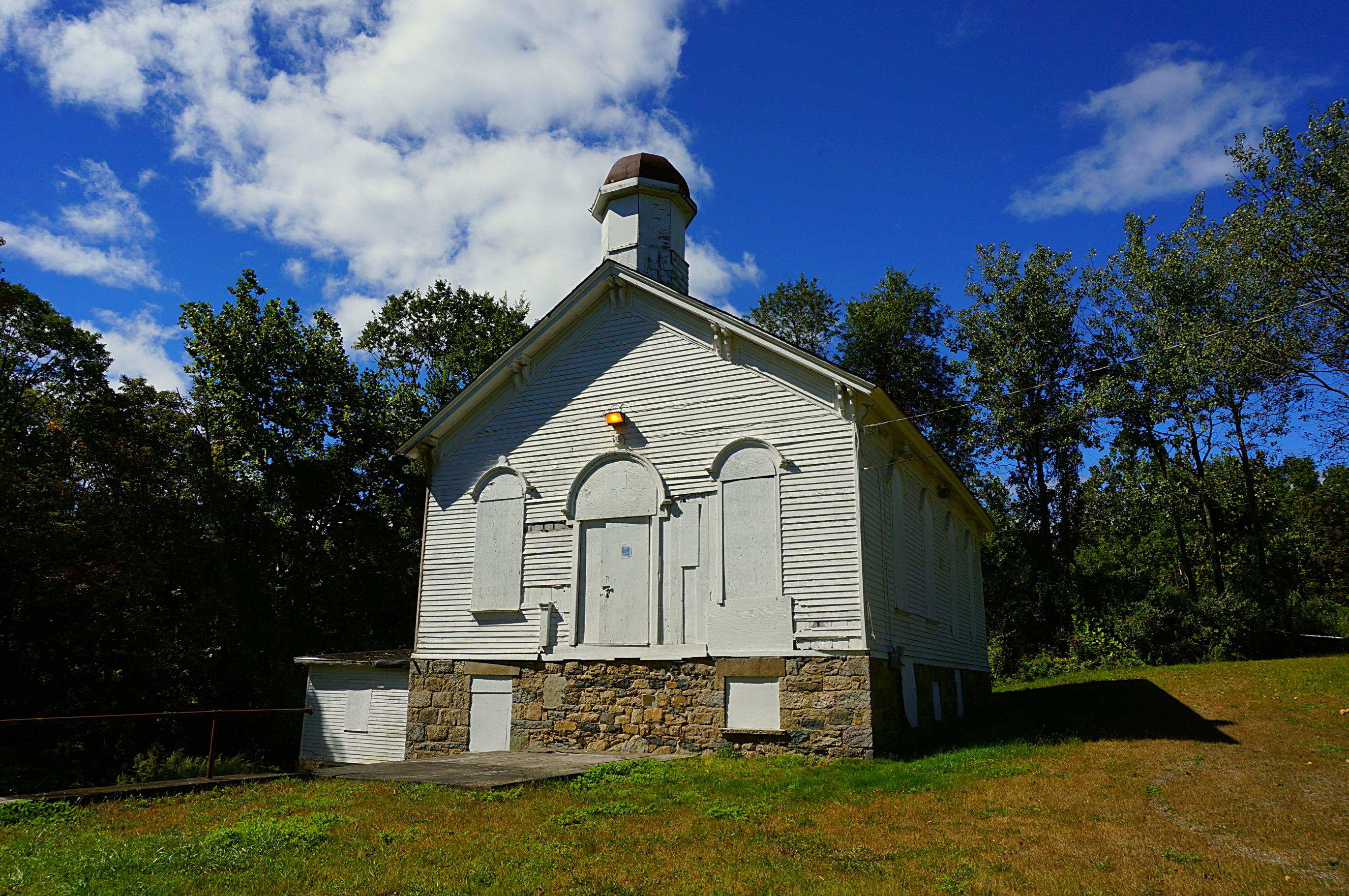
- Mount Hope Miners' Church in 2013

- Location within Morris County, New Jersey Location within New Jersey Location within the United States
- Location: Mount Hope Road, Mount Hope, New Jersey
- Coordinates: 40°55′42″N 74°32′39″W
- Built: 1868
- Architectural style: Italianate
- NRHP reference No.: 12000530
- NJRHP No.: 5097

Significant dates
- Added to NRHP: August 20, 2012
- Designated NJRHP: June 25, 2012

The Mount Hope Miners' Church, also known as the Mount Hope Methodist Episcopal Church, is located on Mount Hope Road in the Mount Hope section of Rockaway Township in Morris County, New Jersey, United States. The historic wood frame church was built in 1868 and was added to the National Register of Historic Places on August 20, 2012, for its significance in architecture, social history, and religion. It features an octagonal bell tower with a dome cupola. The church was damaged on July 10, 1926, when lightning struck an ammunition building at the Picatinny Arsenal near Lake Denmark.

== See also ==
- National Register of Historic Places listings in Morris County, New Jersey
- List of Methodist churches in the United States
