= Wildcat Ridge Wildlife Management Area =

Wildlife Management Area

Coordinates: 40.94048°N 74.51442°W

Wildcat Ridge WMA (Wildlife Management Area) is administered by the New Jersey Department of Environmental Protection. It is located in the southern end of Rockaway Township, Morris County, New Jersey, United States off of County Route 513 (Greenpond Road). Farny State Park (undeveloped) and Splitrock Reservoir area are contiguous with Wildcat Ridge and also have public access.

== Activities ==
- Hiking
- Mountain biking
- Hawkwatch
- Bat cave

== Points of interest ==
This WMA was an iron mining area and was the site of the Hibernia mines, Beach Glen mines and the Oreland (Upper Hibernia mine). All of the mine shaft openings have been closed off for the safety of the public. There are various ruins at each of the mine sites. In addition to these civil war era mines the Adventure/Hibernia Furnace was located approximately across the Hibernia brook from the current Hibernia Firehouse. This is also the site of many ruins of the Hibernia mine.

1. Bat cave – this was the Hibernia mine tunnel where the underground railroad was located.
2. Hawkwatch
3. Oreland spur of the Wharton and Northern railroad.
4. St. Patrick's Cemetery - an abandoned cemetery originally established in 1869. Many of the headstones are engraved in an eastern european language, possibly Czech and/or Slovak. The cemetery serves as the final resting place for numerous workers who lost their lives in the surrounding iron mines.

== Parking ==
There are numerous parking areas for this area:

- At the beginning of Four Birds hiking trail 2.7 miles (4.3 km) north of I-80.
- Parking for the Oreland and hawkwatch area is along Upper Hibernia road. To get there take Greenpond road north from I-80 for 6.1 miles (9.8 km) and make a right going past the Marcella Firehouse. You will come to a “T” in the road, left is Splitrock road and goes to the Splitrock Reservoir dam and parking area, straight ahead (No Outlet sign) is Upper Hibernia road. There is a parking area under the power transmission lines, there is a parking area just after the pavement ends (Oreland area) and there is a third parking around just before the road is blockaded for the Hawkwatch.
- There are also pullouts on roads that border the WMA. One is on Meridan road opposite the service gate of the Christ Church (formerly HP) property. This provides easy access to the Beach Glen mine area. Another is on Greenpond road just before the left for Lake Denmark road. This is where the Orleand spur of the Wharton and Northern crossed Greenpond road.
