= Hibernia Mine Railroad =

Mine railroad in New Jersey

Map

The Hibernia Mine Railroad was a mine railroad in Morris County, New Jersey that operated between Hibernia and Rockaway from 1863 to 1946.

== History ==
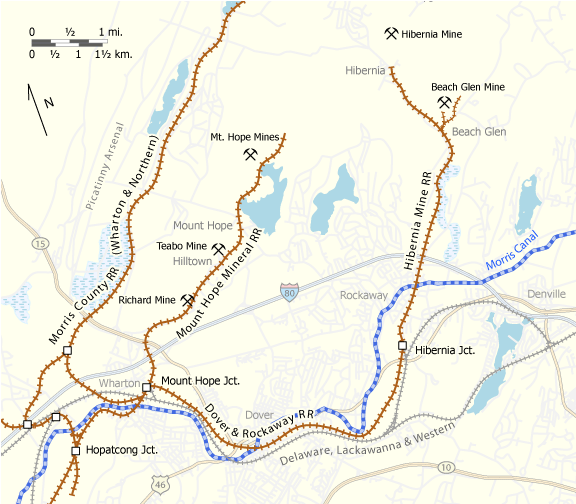
Hibernia Mine Railroad and the neighboring lines of the CNJ High Bridge Branch

The railroad was incorporated in 1863 by various owners of the Hibernia iron mines. It was authorized to transport ore from the mines to the Morris Canal, with the possibility of extension south to the Morris and Essex Railroad. That extension was built in 1868, and the charter was modified to allow the use of steam power along the length of the line, which previously had been limited to animal power between the mines and the canal.

In 1881 the completion of the Dover and Rockaway Railroad established a connection between the Hibernia Mine RR and the Central Railroad of New Jersey (CNJ) at Port Oram (modern day Wharton). The line operated profitably on its ore business, making it an attractive acquisition for the CNJ, which leased it in 1890 and incorporated it into the High Bridge Branch line.

Production at the Hibernia Mines rapidly declined during the 1890s and by 1907 only one shaft was producing. The Hibernia mines were finally closed in 1916, and although the Beach Glen mines reopened briefly in the 1920s, all the mines were closed in 1930. Although the ore traffic ceased, several industrial customers in Rockaway remained, and in 1930 the CNJ eliminated the expenses of its lease by purchasing the line outright, eventually abandoning the northern portion of the line in 1946. The segment that serviced Rockaway's industrial customers remains in operation and is operated today by the Morristown and Erie railroad.

== Sources ==
- Iron Mine Railroads of Northern New Jersey, Larry Lowenthal, 1981, Tri-State Railway Historical Society.
