= Methodist Episcopal Church (Hibernia, New Jersey) =

Historic church in New Jersey, United States

- Methodist Episcopal Church of Hibernia
- U.S. National Register of Historic Places
- New Jersey Register of Historic Places
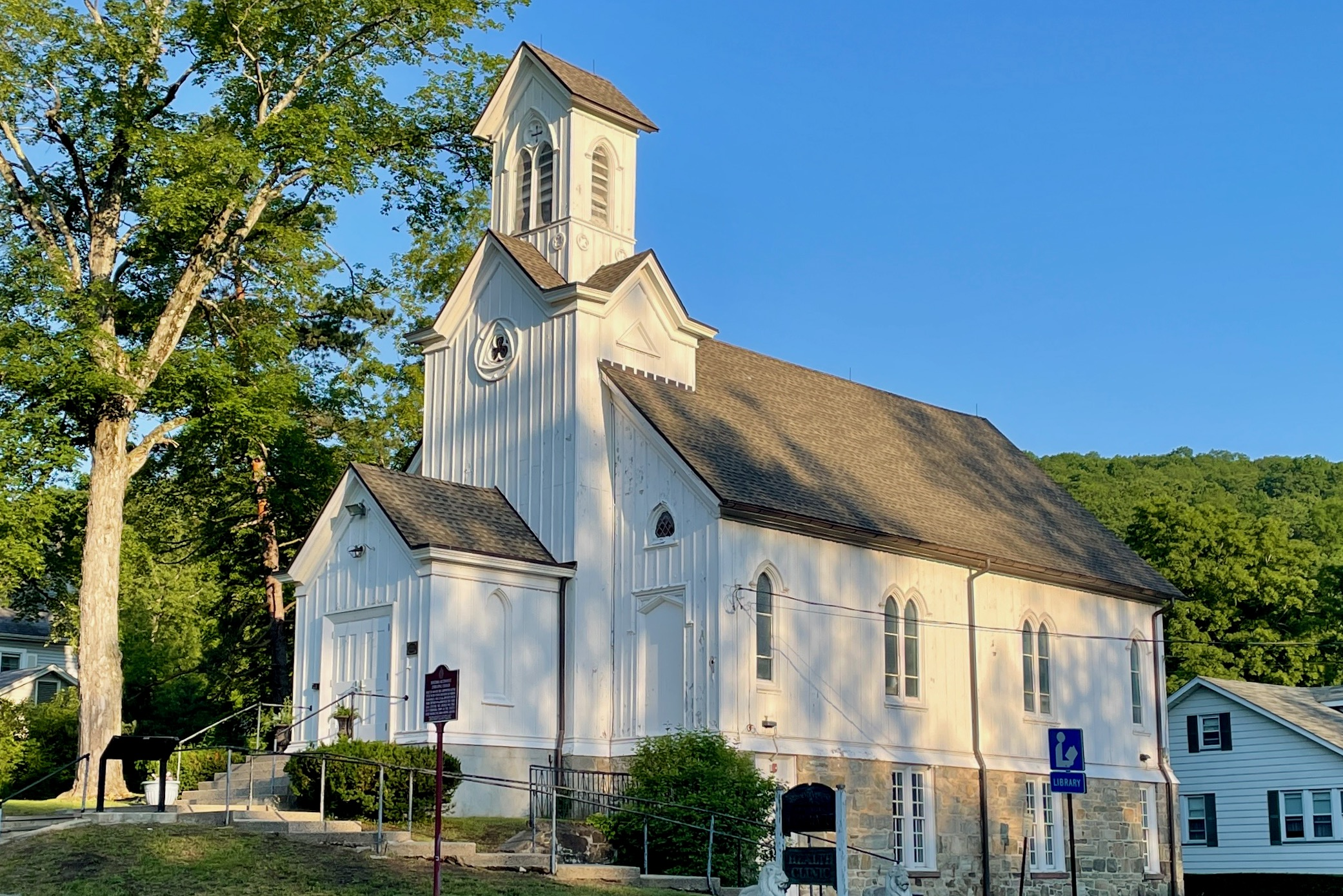
- Methodist Episcopal Church in 2021

- Location within Morris County, New Jersey Location within New Jersey Location within the United States
- Location: 419 Green Pond Road, Hibernia, New Jersey
- Coordinates: 40°56′44″N 74°29′40″W
- Area: 0.3 acres (0.12 ha)
- Built: 1869
- Architectural style: Gothic Revival
- NRHP reference No.: 11000448
- NJRHP No.: 2240

Significant dates
- Added to NRHP: July 14, 2011
- Designated NJRHP: May 24, 2011

The Methodist Episcopal Church, also known as the Methodist Episcopal Church of Hibernia, is a historic church built in 1869 and located at 419 Green Pond Road in the Hibernia section of Rockaway Township, Morris County, New Jersey. It was added to the National Register of Historic Places on July 14, 2011, for its significance in architecture and industry. Since 1970, the building has been used as a branch of the Rockaway Township Free Public Library.

== History ==
Hibernia was home to the workers of the nearby Hibernia mines. Using funds from the iron mining companies, the New Jersey Mining Company built the church in 1869 using Carpenter Gothic architectural style, an adoptation of Gothic Revival architecture using simpler materials. In 1953, the property was sold to the Holy Trinity Lutheran Church. In 1969, it was sold to the Rockaway Township Lions Club, who in turn sold it for a nominal $1 to be used as a public library.

== See also ==
- National Register of Historic Places listings in Morris County, New Jersey
- List of Methodist churches in the United States
