= Gunnar Berg (Scouting) =

American scouting leader (1897–1987)

Gunnar H. Berg (June 30, 1897 – August 28, 1987) was a national director of the Boy Scouts of America.

== Career ==
Berg was born in Oslo and came to the United States at age 13. He was a graduate of Columbia University, and received a doctorate in education in 1946. Berg was associated with Scouting for 42 years, retiring in 1962. He was the founder of the Mortimer L. Schiff Scout Reservation (now Schiff Nature Preserve), as a professional training center in Mendham Borough, Morris County, New Jersey.

Berg lived in Lake Telemark, New Jersey. He died at 90 years at age at Dover General Hospital (now Saint Clare's Hospital/Dover General) in Dover, New Jersey.
