= Lake Denmark =

Lake in Morris County, New Jersey, US

- Location within Morris County, New Jersey Location within New Jersey Location within the United States
- Interactive map of Lake Denmark
- Location: Rockaway Township, New Jersey
- Coordinates: 40°58′15″N 074°30′58″W
- Type: Lake
- Part of: Picatinny Arsenal; United States Army
- Primary inflows: Burnt Meadow Brook
- Basin countries: United States
- Managing agency: NJ Department of Environmental Protection
- Designation: Protected/Restricted
- Max. length: ~4,000 ft (1,200 m)
- Max. width: ~2,000 ft (610 m)
- Surface area: 242 acres (1 km^{2})
- Surface elevation: 961 ft (293 m)

Lake Denmark is a small lake covering 242 acres (98 ha) in Rockaway Township in Morris County, in the U.S. state of New Jersey. Close by are Picatinny Lake in the southwest and the Green Pond to the north.

Lake Denmark is located within the boundaries of Picatinny Arsenal.

== Landmarks and features ==
- The is located at an elevation of 961 ft (293 m) and has a triangular shape. Lake Denmark has a maximum length of about 4,000 ft (1,200 m) and a maximum width of about 2,000 ft (610 m). There is a large swamp with a size of about 4,000 ft^{2} (370 m^{2}) in the north which is part of the lake.
