= Hibernia, New Jersey =

Populated place in Morris County, New Jersey, US

- Census-designated place
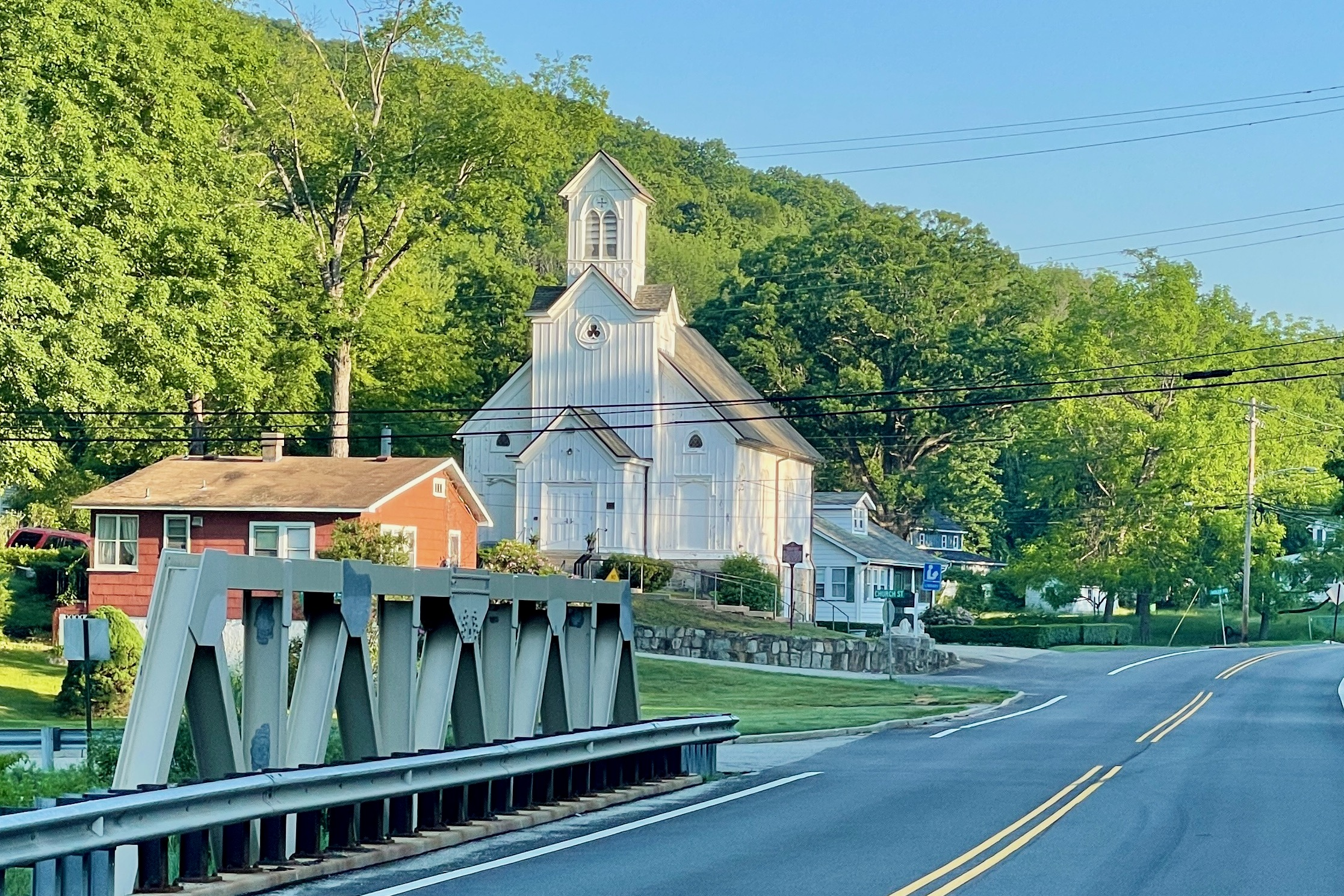
- View along Green Pond Road

- Location in Morris County Location in New Jersey Location in the United States
- Coordinates: 40°56′38″N 74°29′34″W
- Country: United States
- State: New Jersey
- County: Morris
- Township: Rockaway
- Named after: Hibernia, the classical name for Ireland

Area
  - Total: 2.26 sq mi (5.86 km^{2})
  - Land: 2.16 sq mi (5.59 km^{2})
  - Water: 0.10 sq mi (0.27 km^{2})
- Elevation: 538 ft (164 m)

Population (2020)
  - Total: 208
  - Density: 96.3/sq mi (37.19/km^{2})
- ZIP Code: 07842 (Hibernia); 07866 (Rockaway)
- FIPS code: 34-31170
- GNIS feature ID: 877076

Hibernia is an unincorporated community and census-designated place (CDP) located along County Route 513 (Green Pond Road) in Rockaway Township of Morris County, in the U.S. state of New Jersey. The area is served as United States Postal Service ZIP Code 07842. The community takes its name from Hibernia, the classical name for Ireland.

As of the 2020 United States census, the area had a population of 208.

The Hibernia mines, a series of iron mines worked from pre-Revolutionary times until 1916, are located here.

== Geography ==
Hibernia is in northern Morris County, just south of the geographic center of Rockaway Township. It is bordered to the north by the community of Lake Telemark and to the south by the community of White Meadow Lake. County Route 513 (Green Pond Road) passes through Hibernia, leading north 6 miles (10 km) to Green Pond and 9 miles (14 km) to New Jersey Route 23 at Newfoundland, while to the south it leads less than 4 miles (6 km) to Rockaway borough.

The community sits at an elevation of 650 feet (198 m) in the valley of Hibernia Brook, between hills which rise to elevations over 1,000 feet (305 m) to the east and west. Hibernia Brook flows south toward Beaver Brook and is part of the Rockaway River watershed leading east to the Passaic River.

Since 1970, the former Methodist Episcopal Church on Green Pond Road has been used as a branch of the Rockaway Township Free Public Library.

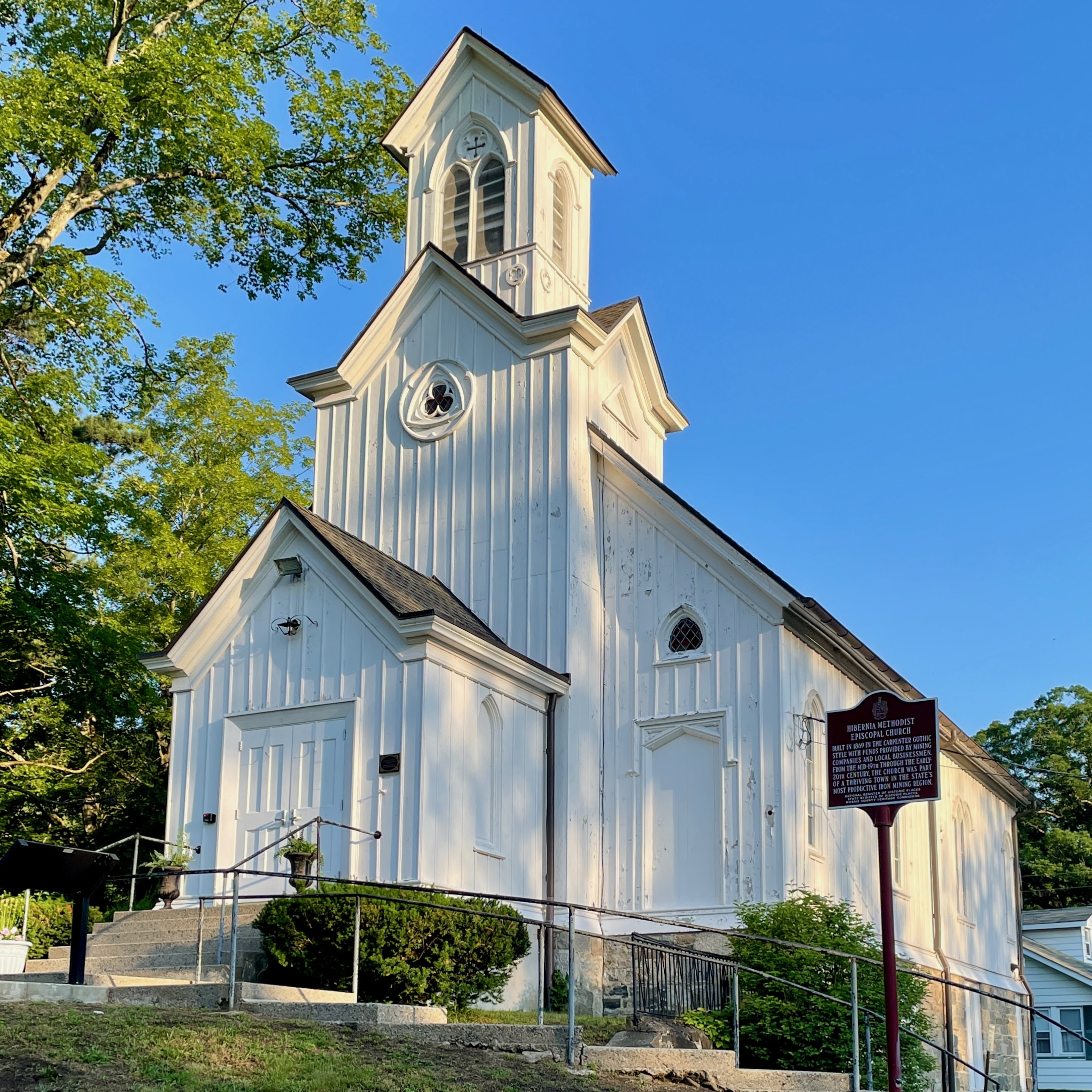
Methodist Episcopal Church, now a library

== Demographics ==
Historical population
Census	Pop.	Note	%±
2020	208		—
U.S. Decennial Census

Hibernia was first listed as a census designated place in the 2020 U.S. census.

Hibernia CDP, New Jersey – Racial and ethnic composition Note: the US Census treats Hispanic/Latino as an ethnic category. This table excludes Latinos from the racial categories and assigns them to a separate category. Hispanics/Latinos may be of any race.
Race / Ethnicity (NH = Non-Hispanic)	Pop 2020	2020
White alone (NH)	117	56.25%
Black or African American alone (NH)	3	1.44%
Native American or Alaska Native alone (NH)	0	0.00%
Asian alone (NH)	14	6.73%
Native Hawaiian or Pacific Islander alone (NH)	0	0.00%
Other race alone (NH)	1	0.48%
Mixed race or Multiracial (NH)	30	14.42%
Hispanic or Latino (any race)	43	20.67%
Total	208	100.00%

== Notable people ==
People who were born in, residents of, or otherwise closely associated with Hibernia include:

- Thomas J. Hillery (1871–1920), president of the New Jersey Senate
