= United States Army DEVCOM Armaments Center =

U.S. Army's primary R&D arm for armaments and munitions

Coordinates: 40.95953°N 74.52774°W

DEVCOM Armaments Center
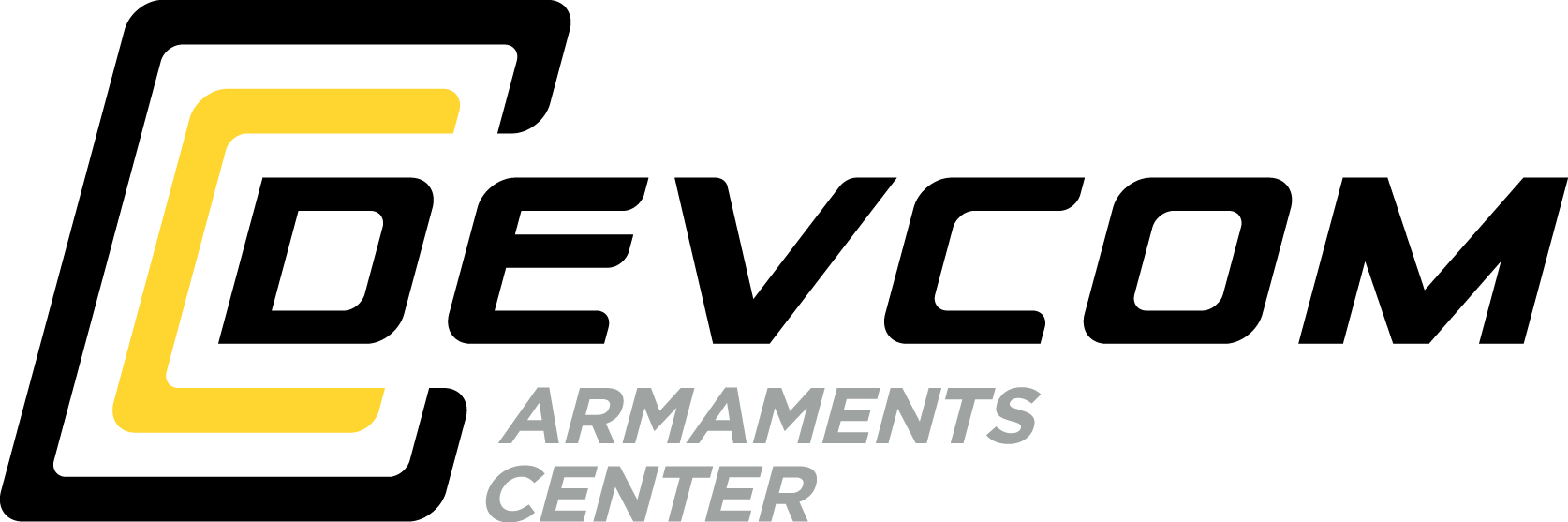
- DEVCOM AC logo
- Active: 1977–present
- Country: United States
- Branch: Army
- Type: Research and Development
- Size: 3,000 employees
- Part of: U.S. Army Combat Capabilities Development Command
- Garrison/HQ: Picatinny Arsenal, New Jersey
- Website: ac.devcom.army.mil

Insignia
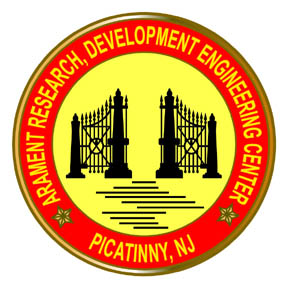
- ARDEC logo

The U.S. Army DEVCOM Armaments Center (DEVCOM AC), sometimes the Armaments Center (AC), is the United States Army's primary research and development facility for armaments and munitions. DEVCOM AC is headquartered at the Picatinny Arsenal in New Jersey.

In February 2019, the Armament Research, Development and Engineering Center (ARDEC) became the CCDC Armaments Center, when it was aligned with U.S. Army Futures Command – along with its senior organization, the U.S. Army Combat Capabilities Development Command.

The DEVCOM Armaments Center performs research for the U.S. Army, the U.S. Special Operations Command (SOCOM), and other U.S. military organizations. It is one of several specialized research centers in the U.S. Army Transformation and Training Command.

== Research ==
Systems that the DEVCOM Armaments Center has worked on include: fire control systems and ammunition for the M2 Bradley and M1 Abrams, as well as missiles like the M712 Copperhead anti-tank artillery missile and the Patriot missile. More recently, ARDEC has worked on bunker defeat munitions, the XM107 sniper rifle, the M919 round for the M242 Bushmaster, the M830 high-explosive anti-tank (HEAT) munition, the M211 and M212 countermeasure flares, the M4 carbine, and many other systems.

DEVCOM Armaments Center works to develop more advanced weapons, using technologies such as microwaves, lasers, and nanotechnology.

== History ==
The DEVCOM Armaments Center traces its history to 1977, with the creation of the U.S. Army Armament Research and Development Command (ARRADCOM). The mission of ARRADCOM was to create new and improve existing weapons and munitions. Among their early work was modeling for the M1 Abrams tank. Under ARRADCOM lived the R&D organizations of the Picatinny Arsenal, the Edgewood Arsenal, the Ballistic Research Lab, and the Watervliet Arsenal.

In 1983, ARRADCOM's mission was transferred to the U.S. Army Armament, Munitions and Chemical Command (AMCCOM) at Rock Island Arsenal in Illinois. The mission, of weapons and munitions-focused R&D, remained at Picatinny Arsenal. It was organized as the U.S. Army Armament Research and Development Center (ARDC). In 1986, a further reorganization of all the Army R&D centers caused the ARDC to become the ARDEC, a research, development, and engineering center. The ARDEC name was retained when transferring under the Tank-automotive and Armaments Command (TACOM) in 1994.

In 2003, the Army's RD&E centers were transferred to the Research, Development and Engineering Command (RDECOM) located at Aberdeen Proving Ground in Maryland.

The ARDEC was renamed the CCDC Armaments Center in February 2019. It became an element of the Combat Capabilities Development Command (CCDC), formerly RDECOM, that in February 2019 transferred from the U.S. Army Materiel Command to the U.S. Army Futures Command.

In 2021, CCDC rebranded to DEVCOM, making the CCDC Armaments Center become DEVCOM Armaments Center.

In October 2025, DEVCOM transferred under the new Transformation and Training Command.

== Locations ==
The DEVCOM Armaments Center has four locations:

- Picatinny Arsenal, NJ – the DEVCOM Armaments Center headquarters
- Watervliet Arsenal, NY – the Benét Laboratories
- Rock Island Arsenal, IL
- Aberdeen Proving Ground, MD

== Organization ==
The DEVCOM Armaments Center consists of a number of directorates, such as the Weapons Systems and Technology Directorate and the Munitions Systems and Technology Directorate.

== See also ==
- Combat Capabilities Development Command, higher authority of DEVCOM Armaments Center
- Nanoweapons
