= Mount Hope, New Jersey =

Populated place in Morris County, New Jersey, US

- Census-designated place
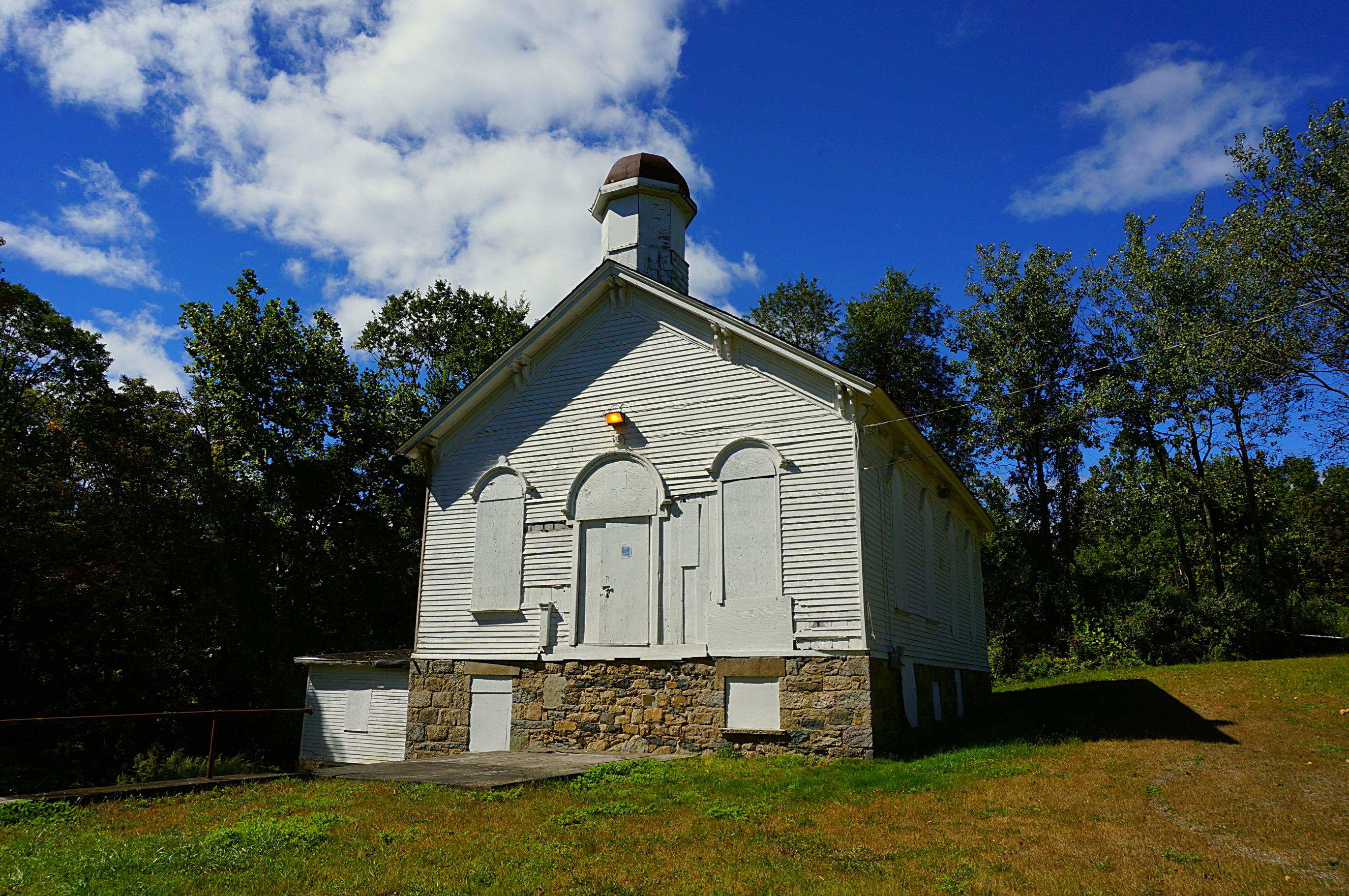
- Mount Hope Miner's Church

- Location in Morris County Location in New Jersey Location in the United States
- Coordinates: 40°55′34″N 74°32′34″W
- Country: United States
- State: New Jersey
- County: Morris
- Township: Rockaway

Area
  - Total: 2.31 sq mi (5.97 km^{2})
  - Land: 2.20 sq mi (5.69 km^{2})
  - Water: 0.11 sq mi (0.28 km^{2})
- Elevation: 823 ft (251 m)

Population (2020)
  - Total: 2,930
  - Density: 1,332.5/sq mi (514.49/km^{2})
- ZIP Codes: 07885 (Wharton); 07801 (Dover); 07866 (Rockaway)
- FIPS code: 34-48930
- GNIS feature ID: 878546

Mount Hope is an unincorporated community and census-designated place (CDP) that is a part of Rockaway Township in Morris County, New Jersey, United States. As of the 2020 United States census, the population was 2,930.

== History ==
Mount Hope was formerly an unincorporated iron mining village associated with the American Revolutionary War. Mining operations were said to have begun around 1710 and operated continuously through the 1970s. John Jacob Faesch was the first to develop Mount Hope into an iron plantation with the erection of a stone furnace in 1772 and operated the facility until his death in 1799. Various owners and lessees ran the furnace until 1831 when the Mount Hope Mining Company was incorporated in response to the opening of the Morris Canal and its transportation opportunities. Operations ceased from 1893 to 1899 due to financial panics, the opening of the Mesabi Range in Minnesota and cheaper imported iron ore from South America. Empire Steel & Iron Company bought the mine and reopened it in 1900. Additional companies and partnerships continued until its final closure in 1979.

The Mount Hope Miners' Church was added to the National Register of Historic Places in 2012 for its significance in architecture, social history, and religion.

== Geography ==
Mount Hope is in west-central Morris County, at the southwestern end of Rockaway Township. It is bordered to the southwest by the borough of Wharton and to the east by the unincorporated community of White Meadow Lake. Interstate 80 forms the southern boundary of the Mount Hope CDP. Dover is 3 miles (5 km) to the south, Rockaway is 2.5 miles (4.0 km) to the southeast, and Parsippany is 8 miles (13 km) to the southeast.

According to the U.S. Census Bureau, the Mount Hope CDP has a total area of 2.31 square miles (5.98 km^{2}), of which 2.20 square miles (5.70 km^{2}) are land and 0.11 square miles (0.28 km^{2}), or 4.60%, are water. The community is drained to the southwest by Green Pond Brook, a tributary of the Rockaway River and part of the Passaic River watershed.

== Demographics ==
Historical population
Census	Pop.	Note	%±
2020	2,930		—
U.S. Decennial Census

Mount Hope first appeared as a census designated place in the 2020 U.S. census.

=== 2020 census ===
As of the 2020 census, Mount Hope had a population of 2,930. The median age was 64.2 years. 10.1% of residents were under the age of 18 and 48.4% of residents were 65 years of age or older. For every 100 females there were 80.3 males, and for every 100 females age 18 and over there were 77.7 males age 18 and over.

100.0% of residents lived in urban areas, while 0.0% lived in rural areas.

There were 1,549 households in Mount Hope, of which 12.3% had children under the age of 18 living in them. Of all households, 40.2% were married-couple households, 12.5% were households with a male householder and no spouse or partner present, and 43.3% were households with a female householder and no spouse or partner present. About 46.5% of all households were made up of individuals and 35.2% had someone living alone who was 65 years of age or older.

There were 1,644 housing units, of which 5.8% were vacant. The homeowner vacancy rate was 2.8% and the rental vacancy rate was 4.7%.

Mount Hope CDP, New Jersey – Racial and ethnic composition Note: the US Census treats Hispanic/Latino as an ethnic category. This table excludes Latinos from the racial categories and assigns them to a separate category. Hispanics/Latinos may be of any race.
Race / Ethnicity (NH = Non-Hispanic)	Pop 2020	2020
White alone (NH)	2,351	80.24%
Black or African American alone (NH)	57	1.95%
Native American or Alaska Native alone (NH)	1	0.03%
Asian alone (NH)	113	3.86%
Native Hawaiian or Pacific Islander alone (NH)	0	0.00%
Other race alone (NH)	13	0.44%
Mixed race or Multiracial (NH)	91	3.11%
Hispanic or Latino (any race)	304	10.38%
Total	2,930	100.00%

== Sources ==
- Ernst Kraus, "John Jacob Faesch, Ironmaster". The Highland Magazine (1974)
- The Historical Society of Rockaway Township
