= Bloomfield H. Minch =

American politician

Member of the New Jersey Senate from Cumberland County
- In office 1902–1911
- Preceded by: Edward C. Stokes
- Succeeded by: Isaac T. Nichols

Personal details
- Born: Bloomfield Holmes Minch; October 10, 1864 Hopewell Township, Cumberland County, New Jersey
- Died: June 24, 1929 (aged 64) Bridgeton, New Jersey
- Party: Republican

Bloomfield Holmes Minch (October 10, 1864 – June 24, 1929) was an American businessman and politician from New Jersey.

== Early life ==
Minch was born on a farm in Hopewell Township, Cumberland County, New Jersey on October 10, 1864, the son of farmer Francis B. Minch and Elizabeth H. Tice.

Minch attended the Hopewell common schools, graduated from the South Jersey Institute in 1883, and finished a course in the Bryant & Stratton's Business College in Philadelphia in May 1884.

== Business career ==
In November 1884, he formed a partnership with William O. Garrison called Garrison & Minch. The business worked from Bridgeton, dealt with farm implements and agricultural produce, manufactured fertilizer, and employed between fifty and a hundred people. He was an incorporator and treasurer of the Cumberland Construction Company, which Garrison was president of and specialized in building bridges and wharfs. He was also an organizer and incorporator of the Cumberland Trust Company of Bridgeton, and an incorporator and director of the State Mutual Life Insurance Company of Camden and the Real Estate Loan and Trust Company of Camden. He was elected vice-president of the Bridgeton National Bank in 1903, and he served as president of the Bridgeton Gas Light Company, the Cumberland Building and Loan Association, the Parker Brothers Glass Manufacturing Company, and the North Bridgeton Land Company. By the time he died, he became president of the Bridgeton National Bank.

== Political career ==
In 1894, Minch was elected to the New Jersey General Assembly as a Republican, serving as one of the two representatives of Cumberland County. He served in the Assembly in 1895, 1896, and 1897. In 1901, he was elected to the New Jersey Senate as a Republican, representing Cumberland County. He served in the Senate in 1902, 1903, 1904, 1905, 1906, 1907, 1908, 1909, and 1910. He was President of the Senate in 1907.

Interested in conservation, in 1902 he pioneered and championed legislation that led to the creation of the conservation boards which conserved the state's timber lands and water sheds. He wrote the legislation that provided the fire lines for the protection of timber lands along the railroad tracks. As Chairman of the Committee on Corporations for years, he shaped corporation legislation and provided the unique charter acts for second class cities with population under 20,000, which was the foundation for the Commission form of government that came from the Walsh Act.

Minch nominated Edward C. Stokes for governor in the 1904 State Republican Convention. He was a delegate to the 1904 Republican National Convention and an alternate delegate to the 1916 Republican National Convention. In 1910, he was nominated and confirmed a member of the State Board of Equalization of Taxes for a five-year term. His term on the Board expired in 1915.

During World War I, he served as U.S. fuel administrator for Cumberland and Salem Counties and was a leader in several Liberty Loan campaigns. When he died, he was a member of the State Board of Conservation and Development.

== Personal life and death ==
Minch was master of the local Freemason lodge, high priest of the local Royal Arch Masonry, and a member of the Knights Templar, the Scottish Rite, the Shriners, the Odd Fellows, the Elks, the Union League of Philadelphia, the Seaview Golf Club, and the Junior Order of United American Mechanics. He attended the First Presbyterian Church. In 1886, he married Mary E. Rebeau of Camden. Their children were Robert F. and Aleta E. Mary died in 1896. In 1906, Minch married Marion Kenney of Somerville.

Minch died at home while at dinner from heart disease on June 24, 1929. He was buried in the Broad Street Church Cemetery in Bridgeton.

Political offices
Preceded by William J. Bradley	President of the New Jersey Senate; 1907	Succeeded by Thomas J. Hillery
