= Thomas J. Hillery (born 1871) =

American lawyer and politician

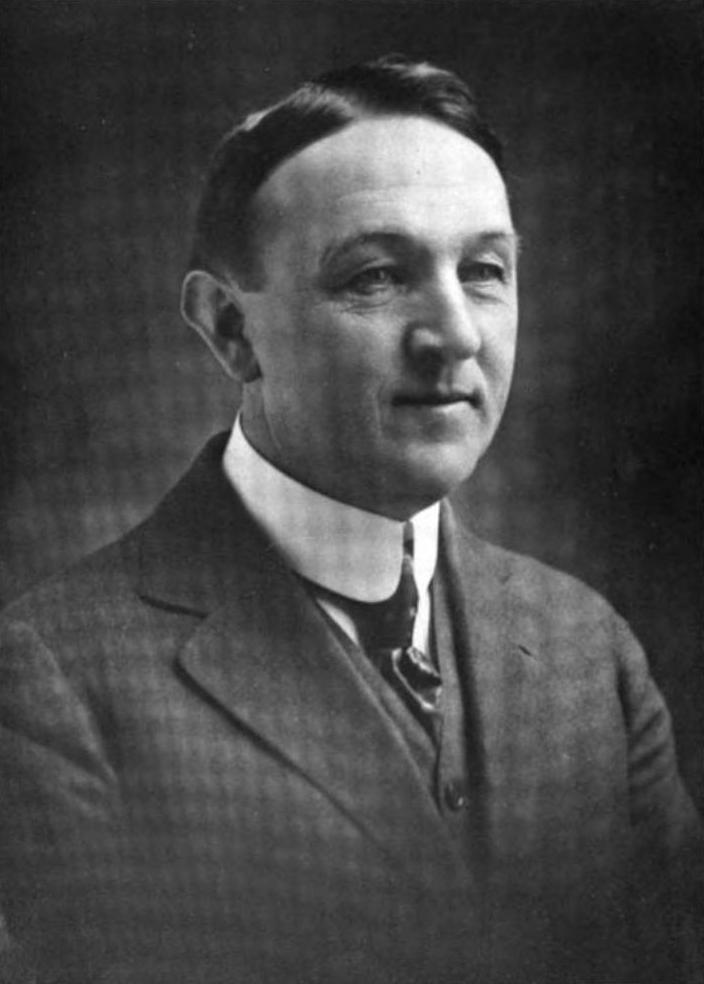
- Born: November 18, 1871; Hibernia, New Jersey
- Died: January 14, 1920 (aged 48); Morris County, New Jersey
- Education: New York University School of Law
- Occupation(s): Lawyer, politician
- Spouse: Rose Mahoney

Signature
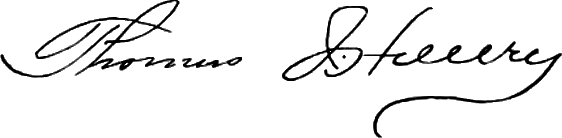

Thomas J. Hillery (November 18, 1871 – January 14, 1920) was an American lawyer and politician from New Jersey.

== Life ==
Hillery was born on November 18, 1871, in the Hibernia section of Rockaway Township, New Jersey, the son of miner John Hillery and Honora Sweeny. His parents were Irish immigrants who immigrated to America in 1861. The family moved to Boonton in 1895.

Hillery attended public school in Hibernia until he was twelve, after which he spent the next two years in the Rockaway public school. After graduating from the latter school, he worked in the mercantile establishment of B. K. & G. W. Stickle for four years. In 1890, he entered the office of civil engineer Lewis Van Duyne and worked as an engineer for eight years. During that time, he studied law in the office of N. S. Kitchell. He then entered New York University School of Law, and in 1901 he was admitted to the bar as an attorney. In 1904, he was admitted as a counsellor. He served in official capacities in several small manufacturing and insurance companies and was president of the United Water Supply Company, the Boonton Electric Company, and the American Trust Company at Morristown. He was appointed superintendent of the Boonton Water Company in 1897, and he was a member of the shoe dealing firm E. J. Cahill & Company. While he was working with Stickle, he obtained an appointment as an alternate to West Point, but as the regular candidate went to West Point Hillery didn't attend the institution. At one point, he successfully passed the examination for deputy United States insurance collector, but he wasn't appointed to the position.

Hillery had a law practice in the Boonton Bank Building. In 1902, he was elected to the New Jersey General Assembly as a Republican, serving as one of the two representatives from Morris County. He served in the Assembly in 1903 and 1904. In 1904, he was elected to the New Jersey Senate as a Republican, representing Morris County. He served in the Senate in 1905, 1906, 1907, 1908, and 1909. He became President of the Senate in 1908. He was also Majority Leader of the Senate for two years. In 1909, he At one point, Governor John Franklin Fort appointed him a member of the Board of Railroad Commissioners for a six-year term. He served in that position until 1915. While serving as President of the Senate, he was Acting Governor for a short time.

Hillery attended Our Lady of Mt. Carmel Catholic Church and wrote a history on the church. He was an organizer and first president of the local YMCA, held a similar position in the Church Library Society, and was a member of the church choir. He was State Vice President of the Holy Name Societies. He was a member of the Knights of Columbus, the Ancient Order of Hibernians, the Royal Arcanum, the Catholic Benevolent Legion, and the Independent Order of Foresters. He was married to Rose Mahoney of Boonton. Their children were Eugene, Leo, Marian, Thomas, Francis, Edward, and Victor. Their son Thomas J. Hillery entered politics as well, serving as Mayor of Boonton, New Jersey Assemblyman, and Majority Leader and President of the State Senate.

Hillery died from a car accident on January 14, 1920. He was traveling with four people, including County Engineer Winfeld Hopkins, County Bridge Inspector Elias Ammerman, and Freeholder Estler, who were returning to Hillery's home in Boonton from a meeting of the Board of Chosen Freeholders in Morristown when a wheel broke off and the car hit a tree. Two of the car passengers were seriously injured, and Hillery died within a few minutes of the crash. He was buried in St. Mary's Cemetery.

Political offices
Preceded by Bloomfield H. Minch	President of the New Jersey Senate; 1908	Succeeded by Samuel K. Robbins
