= Rockaway Townsquare =

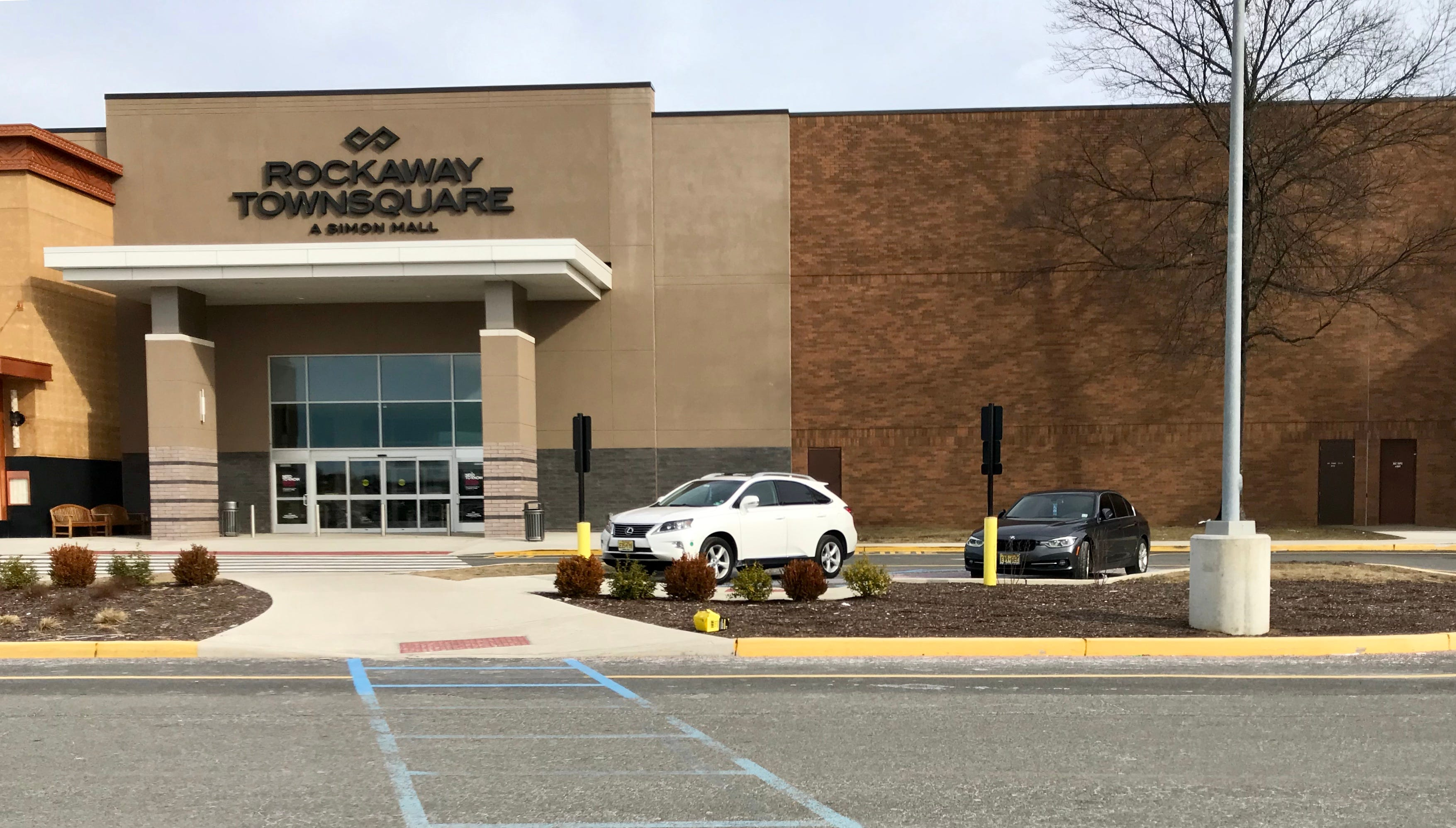
- Location: 301 Mount Hope Avenue; Rockaway Township, New Jersey 07866, U.S
- Coordinates: 40.907°N 74.554°W
- Opened: August 1977; 49 years ago
- Developer: Copaken, White & Blitt
- Manager: Simon Property Group
- Owner: Simon Property Group
- Num. of stores: 152
- Num. of anchor tenants: 3
- Floor area: 1,245,741 sq ft (115,733.1 m^{2})
- Floors: 2
- Parking: Parking lot
- Public transit: NJ Transit bus: 880; Lakeland Bus Lines: 46, 80
- Website: simon.com/mall/rockaway-townsquare

Rockaway Townsquare is a two-level super regional shopping mall in Rockaway Township, New Jersey which opened in 1977. It has a gross leasable area of 1,245,741 sq ft (115,733.1 m^{2}) which includes Macy's, JCPenney, Raymour & Flanigan, and over 140 other stores. The mall is owned by Simon Property Group.

Located in Morris County along Interstate 80, Rockaway Townsquare also attracts customers from Sussex and Warren counties and is under an hour away from New York City.

== History ==
The mall opened in August of 1977. It was built on top of a wetland, which was not protected in New Jersey until 1988 with the passage of the New Jersey Freshwater Wetlands Protection Act, and the former Dover town landfill. A time capsule was enclosed in the interior of the mall, marked with a plaque. The contents were unveiled on August 22, 2000.

Upon opening, the mall contained five large sculptures by Rita Blitt. Most were located on the first floor and reached up through openings to the second; a 20-foot (6.1 m) long stainless steel and brass American flag hung from the ceiling. The silhouette of one of these sculptures, the yellow Stablitt 55, became the mall's original logo. Although the other sculptures have been removed, Stablitt 55 still stands outside the mall, on the corner of the Rockaway Town Court on the east side of the mall.

Two major stores that have since been converted are Bamberger's, which was rebranded along with the other Bamberger's stores to the Macy's nameplate in 1986, and Hahne's which was replaced by Lord & Taylor in 1989 (later closed in 2020). At the Rockaway Commons in the parking, Child World was replaced by Kids "R" Us after Child World went out of business in 1992, later replaced by Office Depot in 2003 and currently occupied by DSW, relocated from the existing Marketplace at Rockaway location, Toys R Us/Babies R Us, located next to Rockaway Commons, closed in 2018 when all locations closed, & is currently occupied by Party City and Acme, also at Rockaway Commons, closed in the early 2010s & is currently occupied by Nordstrom Rack.

AMC Theatres had screens 1–6 in the location currently occupied by Forever 21 (previously FYE and Record Town) located inside the mall, as well as screens 7–12 in the location currently occupied by Best Buy at Rockaway Commons. The 1–6 screens closed in 1998 and the 7–12 screens in 2002. When the theaters originally expanded from six screens to 12 in February 1981, it was claimed to be the first 12-screen multiplex in America. A successor 16-screen theater, also operated by AMC, opened next to Rockaway Town Plaza in 2006.

On August 25, 2009, a small plane crash-landed in the parking lot. The only injury was the pilot, who walked away and was treated.

In 2016, Raymour & Flanigan opened after reconstructing an area of the Sears. In 2020 it was announced Sears would shutter as part of an ongoing decision to eliminate its traditional brick-and-mortar format.

The Cheesecake Factory opened in December 2017. P. F. Chang's opened at the mall in February 2022.

Between January 2019 and Fall 2019, the food court was renovated.

In August 2020, Lord & Taylor announced that it would close its brick-and-mortar format as a direct result of the COVID-19 pandemic.

== Expansion ==
The mall has undergone several expansions since it opened. These include Rockaway Commons, a strip mall in the southeast corner of the property featuring anchors Best Buy, Nordstrom Rack, and DSW, a Hilton Garden Inn & a Morristown Medical Center health pavilion. The Shops at Rockaway Mall, a strip mall, opened in the corner near Interstate 80. Rockaway Town Court is a strip mall at the East side of the mall. Rockaway Town Plaza is a strip mall at the west side of the mall featuring anchors Target, Dick’s Sporting Goods, PetSmart, & a 16-Screen AMC Theater.

== Anchors ==
=== Current anchors ===
- JCPenney (original anchor)
- Macy's (formerly Bamberger’s)
- Raymour & Flanigan (opened as part of Sears)

=== Former anchors ===
- Bamberger's (replaced by Macy’s)
- Hahne's (closed in 1989, replaced by Lord & Taylor)
- Lord & Taylor (closed in 2020)
- Sears (closed in 2020)

=== Upcoming anchors ===
- Dick's House of Sport (opening March 2028, replacing Lord & Taylor)

== In popular culture ==
A scene from the 1984 film Firstborn starring Sarah Jessica Parker shows Parker's character Lisa shopping at Rockaway Townsquare.
