= Splitrock Reservoir =

- Location within New Jersey Location within the United States
- Location: Rockaway Township, Morris County, New Jersey
- Coordinates: 40°57′48″N 74°27′40″W
- Type: Reservoir
- Basin countries: United States
- Max. length: 3.0 miles (4.8 km)
- Surface elevation: 820 ft (250 m)

Splitrock Reservoir is 1,500 acres (610 ha) of wilderness (part of Farny State Park), surrounding a 650 acres (260 ha) reservoir, located on the borders of Rockaway Township and Kinnelon, in Morris County, New Jersey, United States. Splitrock, along with the nearby Boonton Reservoir, provides water for Jersey City, New Jersey. The reservoir is surrounded by woods and can be reached by traveling a mile on a dirt road known as Split Rock Road. The reservoir is three miles from end to end, with many large islands. There is a man-made dam on the southwest end of the reservoir. The reservoir and surrounding natural area were opened to the public on November 21, 2003.

== Activities ==
Splitrock offers various outdoor activities. At the parking area (see below), there is an interpretive kiosk with three panels. One provides an overview for the fisherman, one provides an overview for the hiker and the third provides an historic overview on the Splitrock/Cobb furnace.

Splitrock is a very attractive area for fishermen with small watercraft. The reservoir has a population of smallmouth and largemouth bass, as well as catfish, crappie, sunfish, perch, pickerel and bait fish. Anglers can expect decent fishing for bass, crappie and chain pickerel in the reservoir. Splitrock is categorized as a Lunker Lake by the state of NJ so there is a three bass limit and they must be over 15 inches. From April 15 through June 15 it is catch and release only. There is no shoreline fishing at Splitrock.

There are many scenic hiking trails of varying difficulty. The hiking trails are part of the Farny Highlands Trail Network. A trail map is available on-line from the Morris Trails Partnership. The New Jersey Walk Book, published by the New York New Jersey Trail Conference has a detailed verbal description of the Four Birds and the Splitrock Loop trails. In April 2011 the New York New Jersey Trail Conference published a hiking map that includes the Farny Highlands Trail System. Hikers should look for signs of white-tailed deer, black bear and wild turkey along the trail, as well as waterfowl and neotropical birds during the spring and fall migrations.

== Parking ==
A 25-vehicle parking area for visitors was developed on November 23, 2003. The new parking area provides reservoir access for people who want to launch a non-motorised boat for fishing, kayaking or canoeing. It is the only launch the public is permitted to use. Parking on Split Rock Road is prohibited and is patrolled by Rockaway Township police.

The parking area also provides a trailhead for hiking the 13.8-mile (22.2 km) loop trail. This hike and another loop hike are described in "Hiking the Jersey Highlands", an illustrated guide to 35 hikes in the Highlands of New Jersey, with a trail map for each hike, introductory chapters on Highlands history and preservation, geology, plants, and wildlife, and a special 16-page insert of color photos of wildflowers seen along the trails. This book is published by the New York-New Jersey Trail Conference.

This new parking area provides access for anglers, hikers and wildlife watchers to explore Splitrock Reservoir. There is also a Clivus toilet at the parking area but no public telephone, and cell phone reception is generally poor unless you are out on the water.
