= Farny State Park =

State park in Morris County, New Jersey

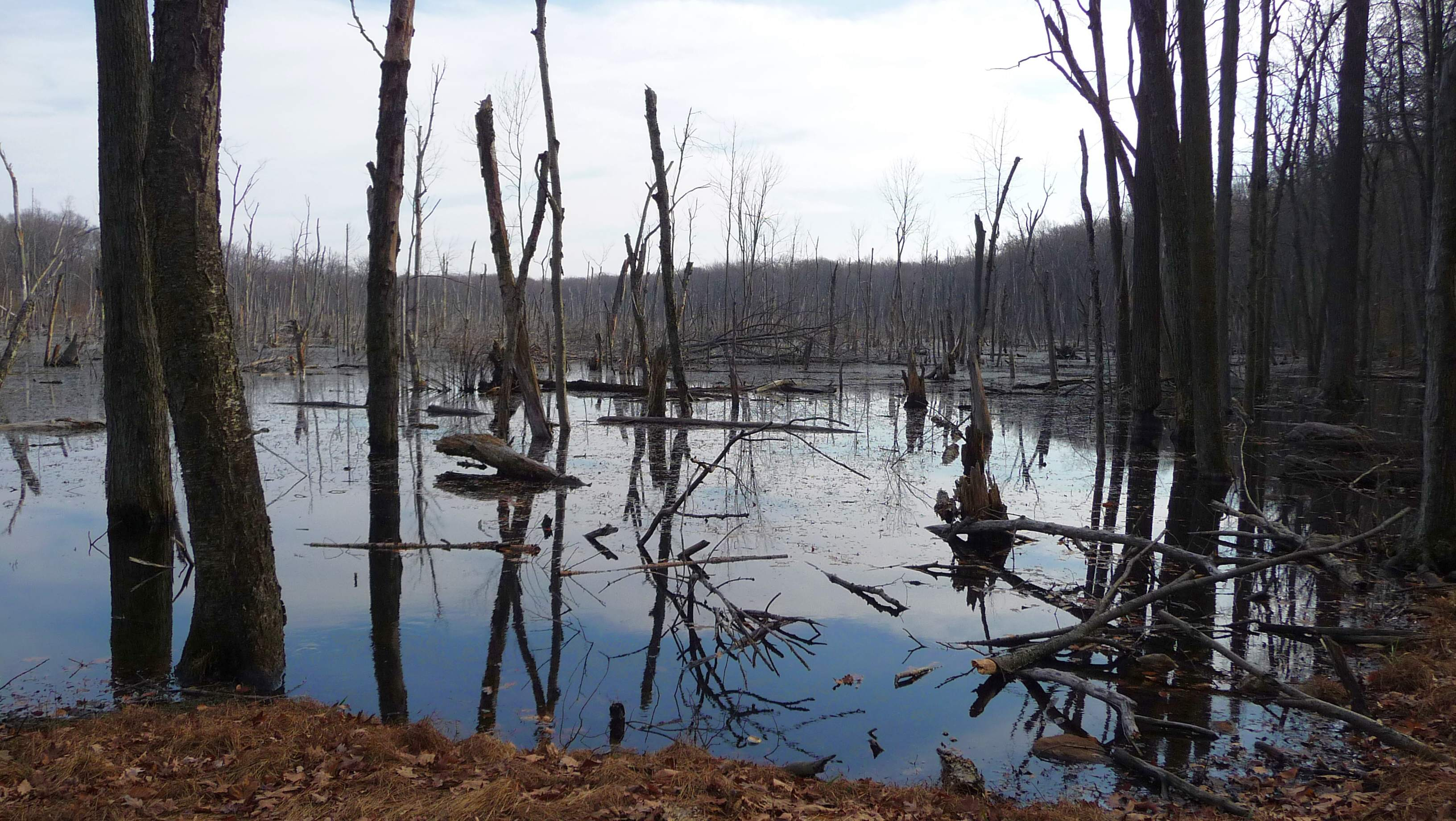
- Swamp in Farny Park

- Location within New Jersey Location within the United States
- Location: Rockaway Township
- Coordinates: 40°57′45″N 74°27′29″W
- Area: 4,866-acre (19.69 km^{2})
- Opened: 1943
- Operator: New Jersey Division of Parks and Forestry
- Website: Official website

Farny State Park is a 4,866-acre (19.69 km^{2}) state park located in Rockaway Township in Morris County, New Jersey in the United States. It is operated by the New Jersey Division of Parks and Forestry.

== See also ==
- List of New Jersey state parks
- List of New Jersey wildlife management areas
