= Lake Telemark, New Jersey =

Populated place in Morris County, New Jersey, US

- Census-designated place
- Location in Morris County and the state of New Jersey.

- Location in Morris County Location in New Jersey Location in the United States
- Coordinates: 40.960346°N 74.497426°W
- Country: United States
- State: New Jersey
- County: Morris
- Township: Rockaway

Area
  - Total: 2.18 sq mi (5.65 km^{2})
  - Land: 2.13 sq mi (5.51 km^{2})
  - Water: 0.054 sq mi (0.14 km^{2}) 2.54%
- Elevation: 699 ft (213 m)

Population (2020)
  - Total: 1,172
  - Density: 551.3/sq mi (212.84/km^{2})
- Time zone: UTC−05:00 (Eastern (EST))
  - Summer (DST): UTC−04:00 (Eastern (EDT))
- ZIP Code: 07866 (Rockaway)
- FIPS code: 34-38430
- GNIS feature ID: 02390026

Lake Telemark is an unincorporated community and census-designated place (CDP) in Rockaway Township, Morris County, New Jersey, United States. As of the 2020 census, the CDP's population was 1,172.

== Geography ==
The community is in north-central Morris County, close to the geographic center of Rockaway township. It is bordered to the south by Hibernia and to the north by Marcella. Two small lakes are within the CDP: Lake Telemark near the center and Lake Ames in the south. County Road 513 passes through the community, leading south 5 miles (8 km) to Rockaway borough and north 8 miles (13 km) to New Jersey Route 23 near Newfoundland.

According to the U.S. Census Bureau, the CDP has a total area of 2.182 square miles (5.651 km^{2}), including 2.126 square miles (5.506 km^{2}) of land and 0.056 square miles (0.145 km^{2}) of water (2.57%). Hibernia Brook passes through the community, connecting Lake Telemark and Lake Ames, and flowing south toward the Rockaway River, part of the Passaic River watershed.

== Demographics ==
Historical population
Census	Pop.	Note	%±
1970	1,086		—
1980	1,216		12.0%
1990	1,121		−7.8%
2000	1,202		7.2%
2010	1,255		4.4%
2020	1,172		−6.6%
Population sources: 1950 1960 1970; 1980 1990 2000; 2010 2020

Lake Telemark first appeared as an unincorporated community in the 1970 U.S. census; and then was listed as a census designated place in the 1980 U.S. census.

=== 2020 census ===
Lake Telemark CDP, New Jersey – Racial and ethnic composition Note: the US Census treats Hispanic/Latino as an ethnic category. This table excludes Latinos from the racial categories and assigns them to a separate category. Hispanics/Latinos may be of any race.
Race / Ethnicity (NH = Non-Hispanic)	Pop 2000	Pop 2010	Pop 2020	% 2000	% 2010	% 2020
White alone (NH)	1,139	1,145	1,000	94.76%	91.24%	85.32%
Black or African American alone (NH)	4	20	17	0.33%	1.59%	1.45%
Native American or Alaska Native alone (NH)	1	1	4	0.08%	0.08%	0.34%
Asian alone (NH)	15	22	52	1.25%	1.75%	4.44%
Native Hawaiian or Pacific Islander alone (NH)	1	0	0	0.08%	0.00%	0.00%
Other race alone (NH)	1	1	0	0.08%	0.08%	0.00%
Mixed race or Multiracial (NH)	6	13	11	0.50%	1.04%	0.94%
Hispanic or Latino (any race)	35	53	88	2.91%	4.22%	7.51%
Total	1,202	1,255	1,172	100.00%	100.00%	100.00%

=== 2010 census ===
The 2010 United States census counted 1,255 people, 439 households, and 359 families in the CDP. The population density was 570.3 people per square mile (220.2 people/km^{2}). There were 464 housing units at an average density of 210.9 units per square mile (81.4 units/km^{2}). The racial makeup was 93.78% (1,177) White, 1.67% (21) Black or African American, 0.08% (1) Native American, 1.75% (22) Asian, 0.00% (0) Pacific Islander, 1.12% (14) from other races, and 1.59% (20) from two or more races. Hispanic or Latino of any race were 4.22% (53) of the population.

Of the 439 households, 38.3% had children under the age of 18; 66.3% were married couples living together; 11.2% had a female householder with no husband present and 18.2% were non-families. Of all households, 14.4% were made up of individuals and 5.5% had someone living alone who was 65 years of age or older. The average household size was 2.86 and the average family size was 3.16.

25.4% of the population were under the age of 18, 6.8% from 18 to 24, 25.3% from 25 to 44, 32.0% from 45 to 64, and 10.6% who were 65 years of age or older. The median age was 40.9 years. For every 100 females, the population had 105.1 males. For every 100 females ages 18 and older there were 97.9 males.

=== 2000 census ===
As of the 2000 United States census there were 1,202 people, 414 households, and 344 families living in the CDP. The population density was 209.1 people/km^{2} (542 people/mi^{2}). There were 425 housing units at an average density of 73.9 units/km^{2} (191 units/mi^{2}). The racial makeup of the CDP was 97.09% White, 0.33% African American, 0.08% Native American, 1.25% Asian, 0.08% Pacific Islander, 0.67% from other races, and 0.50% from two or more races. Hispanic or Latino of any race were 2.91% of the population.

There were 414 households, out of which 44.2% had children under the age of 18 living with them, 71.7% were married couples living together, 8.9% had a female householder with no husband present, and 16.9% were non-families. 15.2% of all households were made up of individuals, and 4.8% had someone living alone who was 65 years of age or older. The average household size was 2.90 and the average family size was 3.24.

In the CDP the population was spread out, with 28.5% under the age of 18, 5.7% from 18 to 24, 31.9% from 25 to 44, 24.6% from 45 to 64, and 9.2% who were 65 years of age or older. The median age was 37 years. For every 100 females, there were 105.5 males. For every 100 females age 18 and over, there were 99.1 males.

The median income for a household in the CDP was $70,536, and the median income for a family was $85,000. Males had a median income of $52,054 versus $37,206 for females. The per capita income for the CDP was $27,620. None of the families and 1.1% of the population were living below the poverty line, including no under eighteens and 6.8% of those over 64.
