= Picatinny Arsenal =

American military research and manufacturing facility

- Rockaway Township in Morris County, NJ; Near Wharton, New Jersey in United States
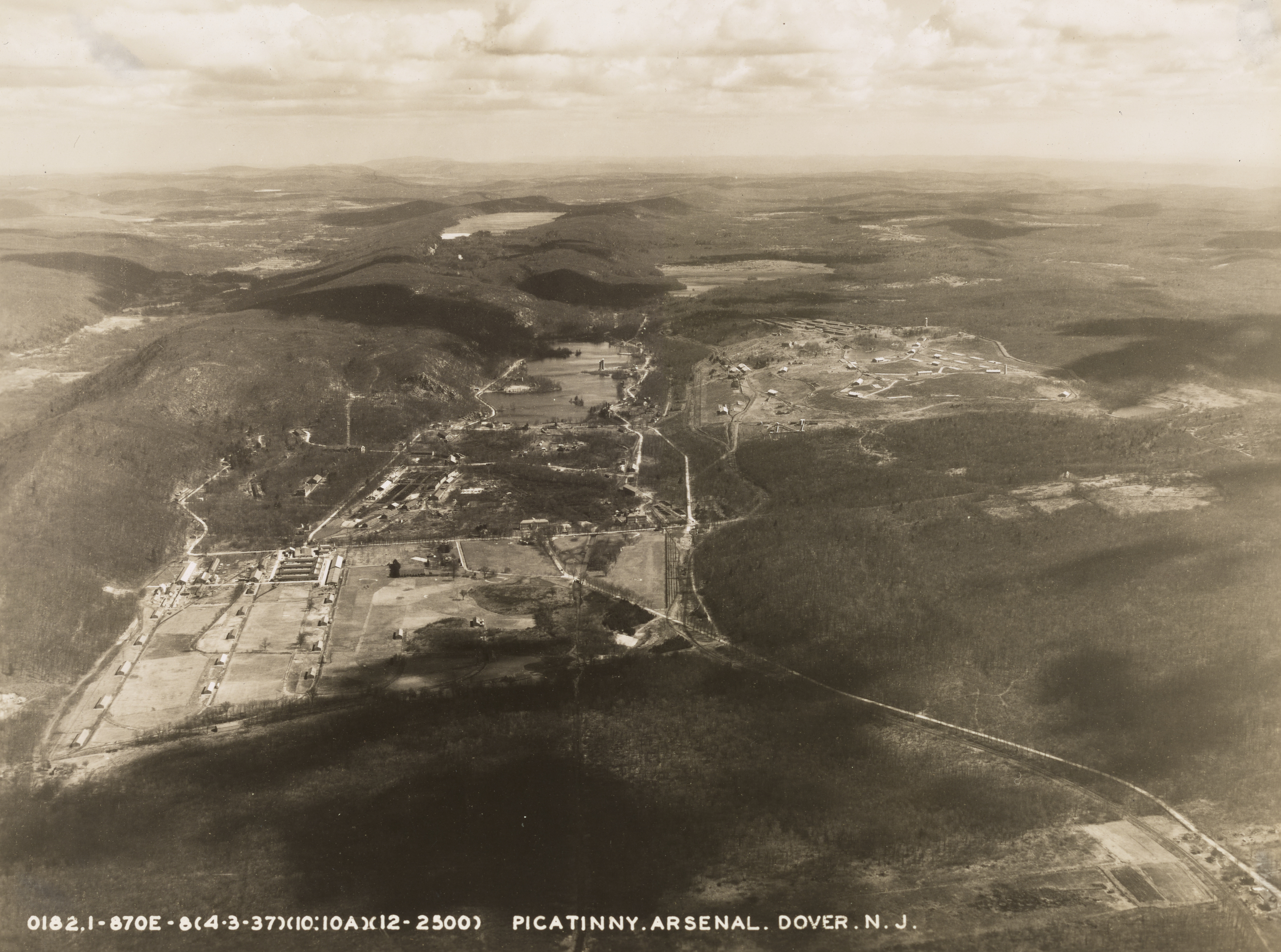
- Aerial view of the facility in 1937

Site information
- Type: Military research and manufacturing facility
- Owner: United States Department of Defense
- Operator: United States Army
- Open to the public: Limited
- Website: home.army.mil/picatinny

Location
- Location within Morris County, New Jersey Location within New Jersey Location within the United States
- Coordinates: 40°56′19.4″N 74°34′21.0″W
- Area: 6,400 acres (2,600 ha)

Site history
- Built: June 26, 1880
- Built for: Army Powder Depot
- Events: Lake Denmark Powder Depot Explosion

Garrison information
- Current commander: Major General John T. Reim
- Occupants: United States Army DEVCOM Armaments Center; U.S. Army Explosive Ordnance Disposal Technology Directorate; Portfolio Acquisition Executive for Agile Sustainment and Ammunition; Naval Surface Warfare Center, Indian Head Explosive Ordnance Disposal Technology Division; Army Counterintelligence Command, Region IV Northeast

The Picatinny Arsenal (/ˈpɪkətɪni/ or /ˌpɪkəˈtɪni/) is an American military research and manufacturing facility located on 6,400 acres (2,600 ha) of land in Jefferson and Rockaway Townships in Morris County, New Jersey, United States, encompassing Picatinny Lake and Lake Denmark. The site is the headquarters of the U.S. Army Combat Capabilities Development Command Armaments Center. It is known for developing the ubiquitous Picatinny rail, as well as being the Army's center of expertise for small arms cartridge ammunition.

The facility was founded in 1880 as the Picatinny Powder Depot. Soon afterward, the Navy acquired a portion of the arsenal to establish the Lake Denmark Powder Depot, later known as Lake Denmark Naval Ammunition Depot.

It manufactured gunpowder until after World War I, at which time the facility also began producing heavy munitions and grew more involved in research and development activities. During World War II, Picatinny was a major large-caliber-round loading plant with 18,000 employees. Today, the facility develops new technologies for the United States Armed Forces and builds various munitions, weapons and armor systems.

Picatinny Arsenal is also home to the U.S. Army Explosive Ordnance Disposal Technology Directorate. This group is responsible for the creation of tools, equipment, and procedures for U.S. Army bomb disposal personnel. Recent developments of 2024 include the use of drones, weapons on a robot platform, and the SWORDS robot. In 2025, the building has been renamed for deceased soldier SFC Scott "Smitty" Smith, killed in Iraq in July 2006.

== History ==
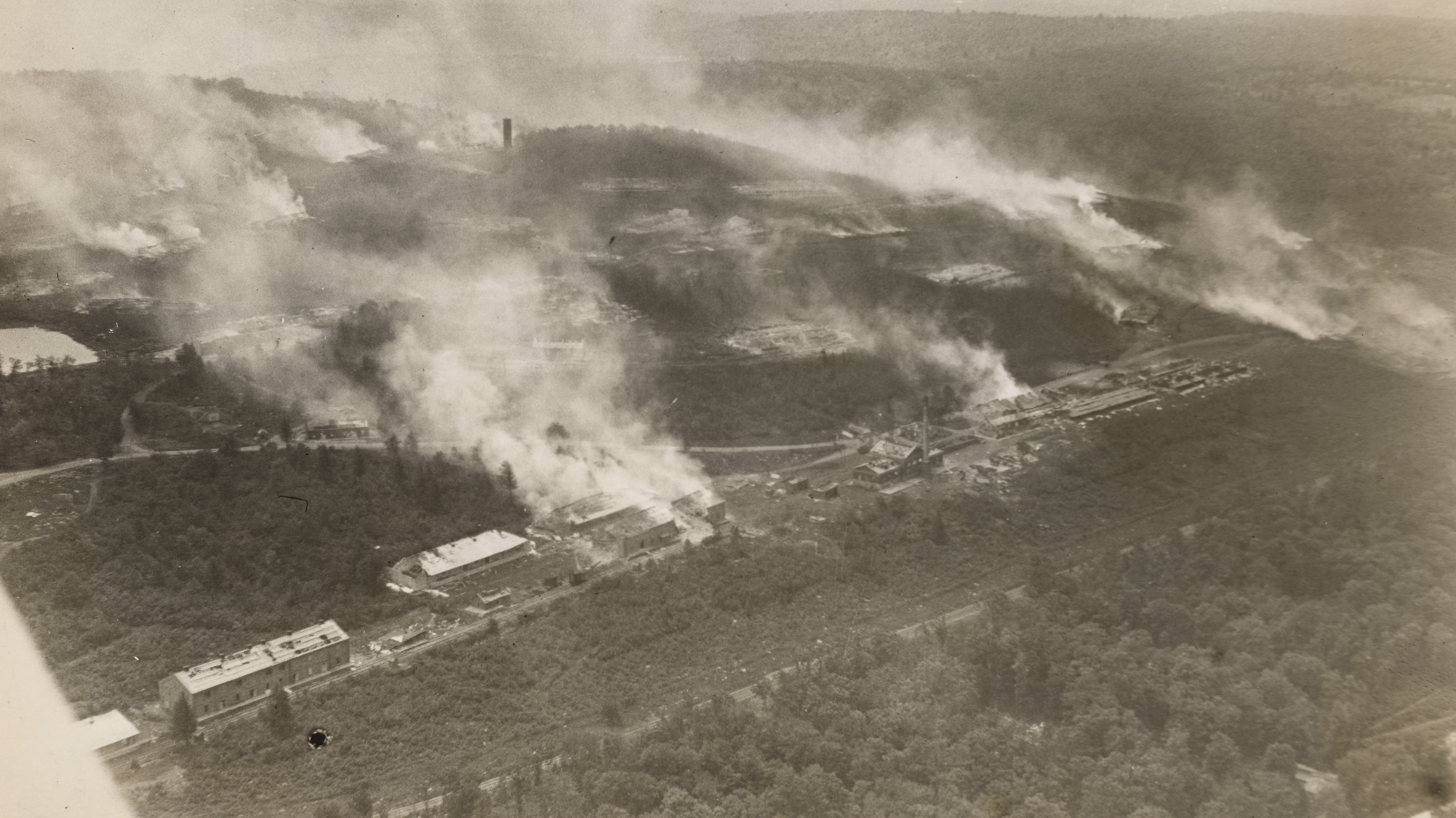
Aerial view of the 1926 fire on 10 July

Prior to the American Civil War, gunpowder was stored by the United States Army at various powder facilities throughout the eastern United States. Many of these facilities were located in the South and were confiscated by the Confederate States of America at the beginning of the war. The federal government began looking for a central storage depot to be located near the large cities of the northeast.

The United States War Department established the Dover Powder Depot on September 6, 1880. Four days later, it changed the name to the Picatinny Powder Depot "after the Lenape-named peak overlooking the old forge, loosely translated to mean 'rugged cliff by water' or 'water by the hills.'"

A deed dated June 26, 1880, records the first land purchase for the future Picatinny Arsenal. George E. Righter transferred 1,195.8 acres (483.9 ha) centered on Lake Picatinny to the United States government in return for $35,874.00. This area, afterwards known as the Middle Forge Tract due to the forge located there during the Revolutionary War, became the central area of the arsenal. In 1880 and 1881, the government also purchased tracts from Uel H. Wiggins, Edward C. Fiedler and other, Henry and Michael Doland, and John E. Kindred. These initial purchases, including the Middle Forge Tract, covered 1,866.13 acres (755.20 ha) and cost a total of $62,750.00. At the same time, the government gave $200.00 to Lewis Spicer and his wife for a 50-foot (15 m) strip on which to construct a road from Spicertown to the powder depot. In 1891, the Army transferred 315 acres (127 ha) bordering Lake Denmark to the Navy. The arsenal was located in a valley between two sets of hills that might shield the surrounding countryside from any accidental explosions.

In 1907, the Army altered the name to the Picatinny Arsenal and established its first powder factory on the site. While continuing to produce munitions, the arsenal moved into research and development work with the start of a school to instruct officers in weaponry sciences in 1911, the establishment of testing and control laboratories during the World War I era, and the beginning of a small, experimental plant for the design and development of artillery ammunition in 1919. In 1921, the arsenal took over responsibility for experimental work on fuzes.

On July 10, 1926, lightning struck a Navy ammunition warehouse and started a fire. As a result, several million pounds of explosives detonated over a period of two or three days. This left not only structural devastation, but military and civilian casualties as well. The value of ammunition destroyed was the equivalent of a billion dollars in present-day terms. As a result of a full-scale Congressional investigation, Congress directed the establishment of the Armed Forces Explosives Safety Board to provide oversight on every aspect of explosives under the control of the U.S. Armed Forces. The review led to creation of a remote, safe depot to serve the West Coast, which became the Hawthorne Naval Ammunition Depot in Nevada, opened in 1928.

The arsenal continued to realize its potential as a research and development facility in the years between the two world wars. Major accomplishments of this period included better methods for storing smokeless powder, improved processing of cyclonite, more commonly called RDX, and the discovery of a new explosive, then known as haleite but later known as Ednatol. (The discoverer was George C. Hale, the arsenal's chief chemist.)

Over the years, the Army continued to make small land purchases to round out arsenal boundaries, but the next major expansion came in 1941, just before the United States entered World War II. At this time, the Army purchased the land between the Cannon Gates and the present main entrance near Route 15. This included Spicertown, an unincorporated village in Rockaway Township. Spicertown had declined from a relatively thriving 19th-century community of small, but profitable farms to a rather depressed area in 1941. Many of the residences housed military families, with the last being demolished in 2007. Near Parker Road is property acquired from the estate of John E. Larson for $16,000.00. The purchase price included 24 acres (9.7 ha) of land. Another former Spicertown property consisting of 12 acres (4.9 ha) cost the government $19,769.00. Property on the opposite side of Parker Road was acquired from Helen Jane Larsen with 1.5 acres (0.61 ha) for $10,534.00, as well as the former home of Clarence and Agnes Burdette, constructed around 1919. At the time, the government appraiser praised the landscaping and the grassy knoll location.

World War II interfered with the arsenal's efforts to concentrate on research and development. As one of the few facilities with the ability to manufacture munitions, it employed 18,000 people and ran three shifts turning out bombs and artillery shells. However, it still had its research triumphs, especially the development of a delay fuze for skip bombing and special bombs for dams and oil fields. It also pioneered production processes later transferred to munitions manufacturers around the country.

In the 1960s, Picatinny was the site of the United States' Army Munitions Command.

After World War II, Picatinny refocused its efforts on developing new weapons and munitions. Its support to the American forces in Korea included an improved bazooka and an illuminating rifle grenade. In periods of peace, the arsenal made important contributions to progress in the areas of radar, pyrotechnics, missiles, time fuzes, and nuclear munitions, including the M65 atomic cannon 280mm howitzer known as "Atomic Annie") When war broke out again, it gave troops in Vietnam a complete family of 40 mm ammunition for grenade launchers and helicopter gunships.

In 1977, the Army recognized Picatinny's leadership in weapons and munitions development by headquartering its Armament Research and Development Command (ARRADCOM) at the arsenal and giving it responsibility for developing small caliber weapons and munitions.

In 1983, the Army disestablished the Armament Research and Development Command and Picatinny became the home of the Armament Research and Development Center (ARDC). In 1986, the name again changed to the "Armament Research, Development and Engineering Center" (ARDEC).

In 1991, during the Persian Gulf War, Picatinny Arsenal provided support in their development of the MIM-104 Patriot missile warhead that was used as a countermeasure to the Iraqi Scud missile.

In 1992, Picatinny Arsenal was tasked to develop a standardized mounting system after the United States Army was dissatisfied with the products on the market. The Picatinny team was headed by mechanical designer Gary Houtsma (who was awarded the Order of Saint Maurice Award in 2014 for this contribution), who took the measurements from about twenty different Weaver rail mount products from weapons bunkers at Picatinny, and even local sporting goods stores, coming up with an average set of numbers set on a 45-degree angled surface. Houtsma then took the specifications to the production facility and requested they design a dimensioning style so the rail could be easily produced and inspected. The factory recognized the similarity of the proposed rail interface to the existing rail design on 105 mm howitzers, so they chose to scale down the howitzer rail design and co-opted the production and inspection procedures. Now commonly known as "Picatinny rail", it was adopted and fielded in 1995 with the designation MIL-STD-1913, dated February 3, 1995.

In 2007, Picatinny Arsenal's largest tenant, ARDEC, received the Malcolm Baldrige National Quality Award.

In 2010, Picatinny Arsenal developed the M855A1 EPR round, an environmentally friendly, improved version of the M855 5.56×45mm standardized ammunition.

In 2014, Picatinny Arsenal obtained its first all-female command pairing, with Lt. Col. Ingrid Parker and Sgt. Maj. Rosalba Dumont-Carrion.

In 2019, the United States Army Armament Research, Development and Engineering Center became a center under the new Army Future's Command and became known as the Combat Capabilities Development Command - Armaments Center (CCDC-AC).

== Lake Denmark Powder Depot ==
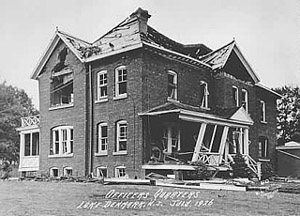
Officers' quarters, Lake Denmark, July 1926

In 1891, the U.S. Navy acquired 317 acres (128 ha) of the arsenal to establish the Lake Denmark Powder Depot, later known as the Lake Denmark Naval Ammunition Depot. On July 10, 1926, lightning struck one of the explosives storage structures during a thunderstorm and started a fire. As a result, several million pounds of explosives detonated over a period of two or three days. Captain Otto Dowling, USN, was in charge at the time, and received a Distinguished Service Cross for his handling of the situation. This caused $47,000,000 in damage, massive structural devastation (187 of 200 buildings destroyed), and military and civilian casualties, including the deaths of 19 people. As a result of a full-scale Congressional investigation, Congress directed the establishment of the Armed Forces Explosives Safety Board to provide oversight on every aspect of explosives under the control of the U.S. Armed Forces.

In 1960, the U.S. Army resumed control of land it had given the U.S. Navy, bringing the installation to its current size and shape.

== Transportation ==
The primary transportation in the early days of the arsenal was by rail. The early Wharton & Northern Railroad (succeeded by the Jersey Central) was laid from Wharton to Green Pond through the heart of the valley in which Picatinny Arsenal now resides. This line connected the various railroads serving the Wharton area with the New York, Susquehanna and Western Railway at Green Pond. Picatinny maintained as much as 49 miles (79 km) of its own narrow and standard-gauge Picatinny Arsenal Railroad to service its many transportation needs (fuel, raw materials, ammunition, etc.) for almost every manufacturing and warehouse building. Today, rail service through the arsenal is just a memory with only a disused stub line into the arsenal and scattered traces of the once-busy narrow-gauge railway. Some of the remaining track has been covered with macadam and turned into pedestrian walking paths.

== BRAC Decision ==
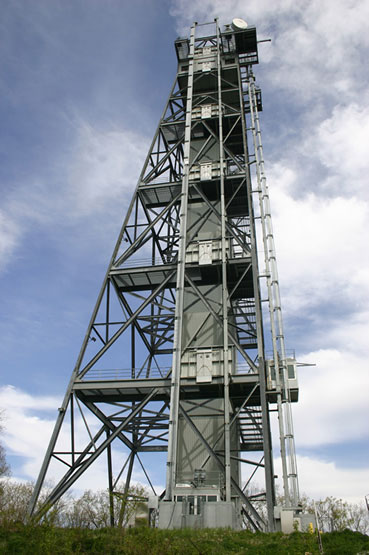
A 215-foot grey metal tower is used for munitions testing and weather research by Picatinny Arsenal Precision Armaments Laboratory.

The 2005 Base Realignment and Closure Commission (BRAC) directed the Department of Defense (DoD) to establish Picatinny as the DoD specialty site for guns and ammunition, and to relocate Navy technical experts to Picatinny. It recommended:

- Creation of an integrated weapons and armament specialty site for guns and ammunition at Picatinny Arsenal
- Consolidation of the following facilities at Picatinny Arsenal:
  - Adelphi Laboratory Center in Maryland
  - Naval Surface Warfare Center Division at Crane, Indiana, including the Fallbrook, California, detachment
  - Naval Surface Warfare Center Division Dahlgren, Virginia
  - Louisville, Kentucky, detachment of Naval Surface Warfare Center Division, Port Hueneme, California
  - Naval Air Warfare Center Weapons Division, China Lake, California
  - Naval Surface Warfare Center Division, Indian Head, Maryland
  - Naval Surface Warfare Center Division, Earle, New Jersey

This recommendation realigned and consolidates those gun and ammunition facilities working in weapons and armaments research, development and acquisition. Picatinny Arsenal is the center for the DoD's research, development and acquisition of guns and ammunition, with a workload more than an order of magnitude greater than any other DoD facility in this area. It also is home to the DoD's single manager for conventional ammunition.

== Environmental contamination ==
Picatinny Arsenal
- Superfund site
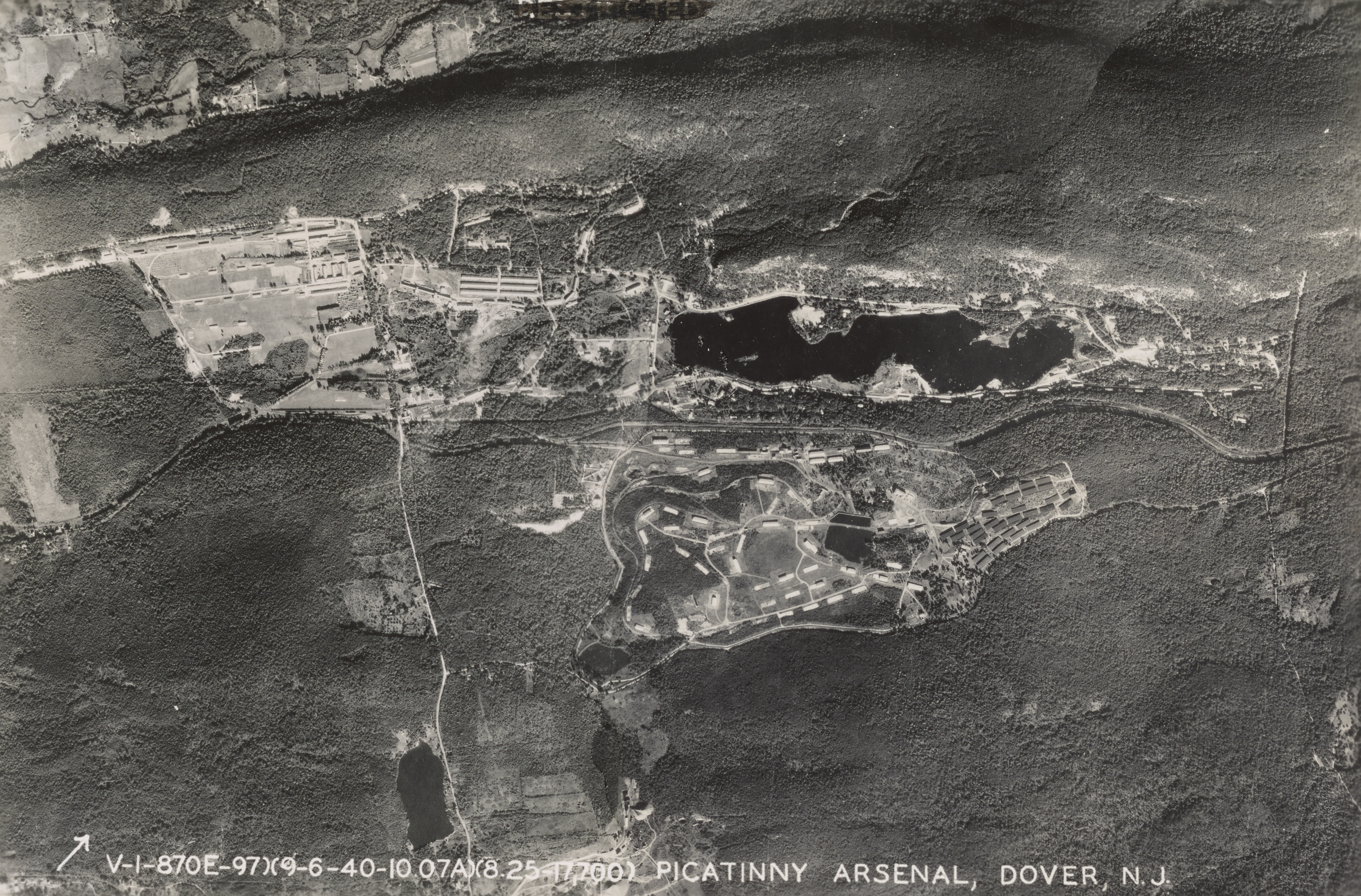
- Aerial view of Picatinny Arsenal, pre-1947

- Location within Morris County, New Jersey Location within New Jersey
- Location: Rockaway, Morris, New Jersey

Information
- CERCLIS ID: NJ3210020704
- Responsible parties: United States Army

Progress
- Proposed: July 14, 1989
- Listed: February 21, 1990

From 1976, the Army conducted numerous environmental studies on Picatinny. In March 1990, Picatinny was declared a Superfund site and placed on the National Priorities List. 176 sites are to be addressed under the Installation Restoration Program.

Picatinny had established a Technical Review Committee in 1989, which met every other month. The committee became a Restoration Advisory Board; the Board's public meetings were advertised in The Star-Ledger and the Daily Record.

== See also ==
- 2024 Northeastern United States drone sightings
