= Lou Benfatti =

American football player (born 1971)

Louis Benfatti
No. 78
- Position: Defensive tackle

Personal information
- Born: March 9, 1971 (age 55); Green Pond, New Jersey, U.S.
- Listed height: 6 ft 4 in (1.93 m)
- Listed weight: 278 lb (126 kg)

Career information
- High school: Morris Knolls (Denville Township, New Jersey)
- College: Penn State
- NFL draft: 1994: 3rd round, 94th overall pick

Career history
- New York Jets (1994–1996)

Awards and highlights
- First-team All-American (1993); Second-team All-Big Ten (1993)

Career NFL statistics
- Tackles: 21
- Stats at Pro Football Reference

Lewis Vincent Benfatti (born March 9, 1971) is an American former professional football player. The 6' 4", 278 lb., defensive tackle was the third round pick (#94 overall) of the New York Jets in the 1994 NFL draft. He played three seasons (1994–1996) with the Jets. Benfatti was named All-American and a Lombardi Award finalist while at Penn State University. A team captain for the Nittany Lions, he played in the 1994 East-West Shrine Game and Senior Bowl games.

He earned a Bachelor of Arts in speech communication from Penn State in 1993. Benfatti was an All-State football player and heavyweight wrestler at Morris Knolls High School in Denville Township, New Jersey.

Benfatti is the principal of Hopatcong Middle School, in Hopatcong, New Jersey.
