= Comet (dinghy) =

Sailboat class

Development
- Designer: C. Lowndes Johnson
- Location: United States
- Year: 1932
- No. built: 4,100
- Builders: Lippincott Boat Works; Customflex David Beaton & Sons Skaneateles Boat & Canoe Co. Siddons & Sindle; Whitecap Composites
- Role: One-design racer
- Name: Comet

Boat
- Displacement: 260 lb (118 kg)
- Draft: 1.75 ft (0.53 m) with the centerboard down

Hull
- Type: Monohull
- Construction: wood or Fiberglass
- LOA: 16.00 ft (4.88 m)
- LWL: 15.00 ft (4.57 m)
- Beam: 5.50 ft (1.68 m)

Hull appendages
- Keel: centerboard
- Rudder: transom-mounted rudder

Rig
- Rig type: Bermuda rig

Sails
- Sailplan: Fractional rigged sloop
- Mainsail area: 110 sq ft (10 m^{2})
- Jib/genoa area: 25 sq ft (2.3 m^{2})
- Total sail area: 135 sq ft (12.5 m^{2})

Racing
- D-PN: 92.0

The Comet, sometimes called the Comet OD or Comet One-Design, is an American sailing dinghy that was designed by C. Lowndes Johnson as a one-design racer and first built in 1932. The design has evolved over time via modifications.

The design was intended as a smaller version of the Star keelboat, making it easier to transport.

== Production ==
The design was first shown in an article in Yachting in 1932 and was initially built from wood by the Skaneateles Boat & Canoe Co. Later builders included the Lippincott Boat Works, Customflex and Siddons & Sindle. The current builder is Whitecap Composites of Peabody, Massachusetts, United States. It remains in production, with more than 4,100 boats completed in total.

Plans for the design remain available for amateur construction.

== Design ==
The Comet is a recreational planing sailboat, built predominantly of wood or fiberglass. It has a fractional sloop rig with aluminum spars, running backstays and an optional headstay. The hull features hard chines, a spooned raked stem, an angled transom, a rounded, transom-hung rudder controlled by a tiller and a retractable, drum-controlled, metal centerboard. The boat displaces 260 lb (118 kg).

The Comet has a draft of 1.75 ft (0.53 m) with the centerboard extended and 6 in (15 cm) with it retracted, allowing beaching or ground transportation on a trailer.

To keep it up to date, the class association has allowed modifications to the design over the years, including the addition of self-bailers, a full-width mainsheet traveler, windows in the mainsail and jib for visibility and buoyancy tanks to make the boat unsinkable.

The boat has a boom vang and adjustable backstays. It has two different rigging options, one with three stays supporting the mast and an alternate rig with a jumper and seven stays. Current factory options include a ball-bearing mainsheet traveler, mast rake controls and leading of all lines to the cockpit for control while hiking.

The design has a Portsmouth Yardstick racing average handicap of 92.0 and is normally raced with a crew of two sailors.

== Operational history ==
The design is supported by an active class club, the Comet Class Association. The association has 14 fleets in the eastern US, plus one in Bermuda.

In a 1994 review Richard Sherwood wrote, "an older design, the Comet has many modern features. The bottom is flat and the afterbody is broad. She planes. The Comet is a one-design with rigid controls on size, shape, and materials. Minor modifications through the years have kept her up-to-date."

== See also ==
- List of sailing boat types

Related development

- Star (keelboat)
