= Green Pond, New Jersey =

Populated place in Morris County, New Jersey, US

- Unincorporated community
- Location in Morris County (Inset: Morris County in New Jersey) Green Pond (New Jersey) Green Pond (the United States)
- Coordinates: 41°01′02″N 74°28′40″W
- Country: United States
- State: New Jersey
- County: Morris
- Township: Rockaway
- Elevation: 1,053 ft (321 m)
- Time zone: UTC-5 (Eastern (EST))
  - Summer (DST): UTC-4 (EDT)
- Postal code: 07435
- GNIS feature ID: 876786
- Website: greenpondcorporation.com

Green Pond is a private lakeside residential unincorporated community within Rockaway Township in Morris County, New Jersey, United States. The lakeside community is managed by two corporations, Green Pond Corporation and Lake End Corporation.

Green Pond is located in Rockaway Township in Morris County, but has a Newfoundland (Passaic County) mailing address. Newfoundland came to wider attention in 2003 when large portions of the independent film, The Station Agent, were filmed there. Several scenes of this film took place on Green Pond Road (County Route 513), a public thoroughfare which connects a former New York, Susquehanna and Western Railway depot and Route 23 to Lake End Road and to the private lanes of the Green Pond Village community. Lakeside scenes of The Station Agent that were set on Green Pond were actually filmed elsewhere, as the Lake End and Green Pond Corporations denied lake access to the filmmakers.

New homeowners in either Green Pond or Lake End Corporations pay a fee to the relevant corporation in addition to the usual real estate closing fees, and become "stockholders" in exchange for an interest in the common lands which surround the community. Only stockholders and their guests (who are required to wear ID) may access the lake and the community facilities, which include tennis courts, ballfields, a community center, and a membership-only yacht club that races Comet sailboats. On summer weekends and major holidays, a security guard is stationed at the entrance to Green Pond village to prevent unauthorized access to the beach areas.

== Lake ==
Green Pond
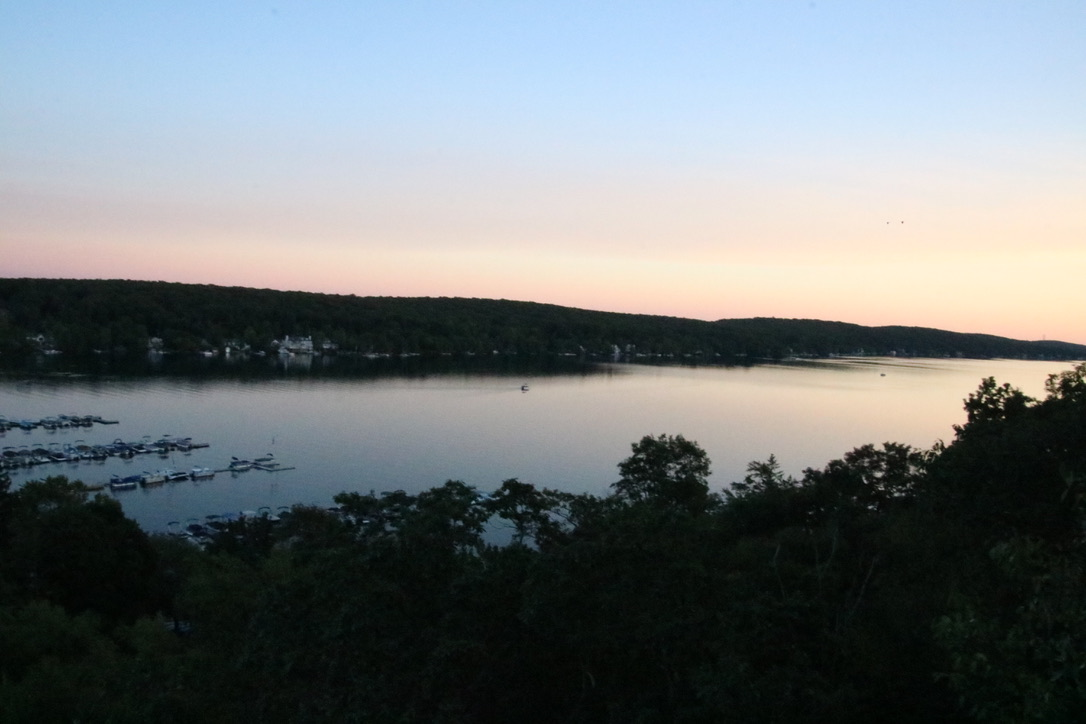
- Fall 2024, taken from popular hiking destination dubbed "Blue Rock"

- Location within New Jersey
- Location: Morris County, New Jersey
- Coordinates: 41°00′23″N 74°29′35″W
- Basin countries: United States
- Surface area: 465 acres (1.88 km^{2})
- Max. depth: 86 ft (26 m)
- Surface elevation: 1,040 ft (320 m)

Green Pond is a spring-fed glacial lake (elevation 1,048 feet (319 m)) that runs along a roughly northeast-southwest axis, bordered on the longer, lateral sides by rocky terrain. On the eastern side is Copperas Mountain (elevation 1,222 feet), and on the west, Green Pond Mountain (elevation 1,240 feet) rises sharply from the lake with a boulder-strewn shoreline. The lake's outflow at the southwestern end is into tributaries of the Rockaway River, which run through the United States Army's Picatinny Arsenal and through an area of legally designated wetlands where development is restricted.

Despite a name suggestive of a small lily pad and algae-coated pool, Green Pond lake is fairly large (approximately 2.5 miles (4.0 km) long and 0.5 miles (0.80 km) in breadth at its widest point - 465 acres (188 ha) total), and the water clarity is high due to the lake's source (underground cold-water springs).

The lake has a number of sand bars and other shoaling features, and the average depth is 13 feet (4.0 m). There are deeper areas also: the maximum depth was measured at 54 feet (16 m) during soundings taken in the 1970s by John Stenz and Doug Charlton. The lake is stocked seasonally with trout and bass; other aquatic species include sunfish, perch, catfish, bluegills, pickerel, and snapping turtles.

=== Community activities ===
Stockholders of the community or guests are granted access to the community facilities, including the tennis courts, ballfields, sailing and motor boating privileges, and participation in the Green Pond Yacht Club and active Community Club, which sponsors several year-round activities. Recreational activities provided by Green Pond include fishing, swimming, water skiing, water tubing, hiking, and cross-country ski trails.

== Geology and mining history ==
The geology of the Green Pond region is peculiar. The lake is situated in the center of the precambrian New York-New Jersey Highlands, a northeast-southwest system of folded and faulted igneous and metamorphic rocks that form numerous ridges and valleys. The "Green Pond Outlier", named for the lake, is a thin belt of Paleozoic sedimentary rocks that bisects the precambrian crystalline rocks and extends for more than 60 miles (97 km) between Interstate 80 in New Jersey and the New York Thruway in New York. In some places, the ground cover is glacial till from the terminal moraine of the Wisconsin glaciation.

From the American Revolutionary War period onwards, the area around Green Pond was a site of extensive mining activity - especially iron mining, which peaked in the 19th century. Currently, there is no active mining in New Jersey. The name "Copperas" (an older term for ferrous sulfate) attests to this history, and the ruins of at least 3 mines are reportedly visible nearby:

- Canfield Mine at the base of Copperas Mountain, where the mined ore was magnetite hosted in Pochuck gneiss.
- Winter Mine, iron in magnetite ore, located east of Green Pond, which opened in 1882 and reopened in the spring of 1885, but closed before 1886. The ore vein was 4 meters wide.
- Pardee Mine, another iron mine in magnetite ore hosted in Poichuck gneiss. Located east of Green Pond at the base of Copperas Mountain, Pardee started about 1870 and closed in 1872, then reopened about 1882 and closed permanently in 1884. This mine reportedly produced 2,500 tons of ore.

== Settlement history ==
Before Dutch settlement of northern New Jersey began in the late 17th century, the region was home to the Lenape Native American tribes. However, despite the 18th- and 19th-century mining activity in nearby areas, the Green Pond lakeshore and immediate environs were sparsely populated by permanent residents until the 20th century. Green Pond village, at the north end of the Lake, was a Methodist church summer camp from the 1920s into the 1940s, and many of the village houses that date to this period remain unheated bungalows of the American Craftsman style that are used primarily during the summertime. However, due to pressure from rising real estate costs in the New York City suburbs, these holiday cottages are gradually giving way to year-round dwellings with central heating. Since 1921 the North Shore of the lake has been controlled by the Green Pond Corporation which owns the land with homeowners being shareholders in the corporation. The Green Pond yacht club, the main social presence at Green Pond, was founded in 1937 as the Green Pond Sailing Club and was incorporated in 1944 as the Green Pond Yacht Club. Along the eastern and southern shores of the lake - areas controlled by the rival Lake End Corporation - almost all of the houses are now inhabited year-round. A few houses are accessible only by boat, most notably the Seven Sisters, an isolated cluster of summer houses on the west side of the lake.

== Green Pond Oil Spill ==
The Green Pond Oil Spill was a delayed oil spill that occurred in 1998 due to a flawed 19th-century oil pipeline. The site of the Green Pond Oil Spill took place in Newfoundland, New Jersey just east of Green Pond Road and bounded by the Pequannock River on the north side. The location was previously acquired by Standard Oil Company from 1881 until the facility was torn down in 1920 where they operated the crude oil pumping station situated along the first major oil pipeline from Olean, New York to Bayonne, New Jersey. The pumping station in Newfoundland utilized large three-sided bottomless oil tanks as part of its reinjection system. Historical records indicate that progressive damage to the pipeline was caused by a series of events that led to oil from the tanks seeping into the underlying groundwater and flowing into the river. In 1996, the U.S. Environmental Protection Agency (EPA) initiated a recovery plan and surface cleanup once alerted about potential threats to the public water supply. The site has since officially been reported demobilized and contaminated soil was prevented from entering the Pequannock River due to the installation of Erosion Control Fencing because of the Green Pond Oil Spill Revegetation/Restoration Project conducted by the EPA.

== Notable people ==
People who were born in, residents of, or otherwise closely associated with Green Pond include:

- Lou Benfatti (born 1971), former defensive tackle for the New York Jets (1994-1996).
- John Drury Clark, (1907-1988), rocket fuel developer, chemist, and science fiction writer, and his wife Inga Stephens Pratt Clark (1906-1970), artist and illustrator, resided in the Newfoundland section of Green Pond in their later years.
- Lawrence Low (1920–1996), sailor who received a gold medal in the star class with the boat Kathleen at the 1956 Summer Olympics in Melbourne.
- Robert A. Roe (1924-2014), politician who served 11 terms in the United States House of Representatives.
