= Hibernia mines =

Series of iron mines in New Jersey

Coordinates: 40.95676°N 74.49793°W

The Hibernia mines are a series of iron mines in and around Rockaway Township, in Morris County, New Jersey, United States, that were worked from pre-Revolutionary times until 1916. The mines worked a vein extending for more than two miles (3.2 km). Several companies operated mines in the area. An adit was constructed into the Hibernia hill to move ore to the railhead of the Hibernia Railroad. Ore in excess of 90,000 short tons (82,000 t) was shipped in 1879.

An exploratory shaft was drilled in the 1950s but was not worked, and the shafts and adit were partly or totally sealed in 1972 and 1989.

After its closure, the mine became the largest bat hibernaculum in New Jersey, with as many 30,000 bats each winter. In 2010, less than 10% that number was found in the mine following an outbreak of white nose syndrome.

== See also ==
- Morris Canal
