= Rockaway Township, New Jersey =

Township in Morris County, New Jersey, US

- Township
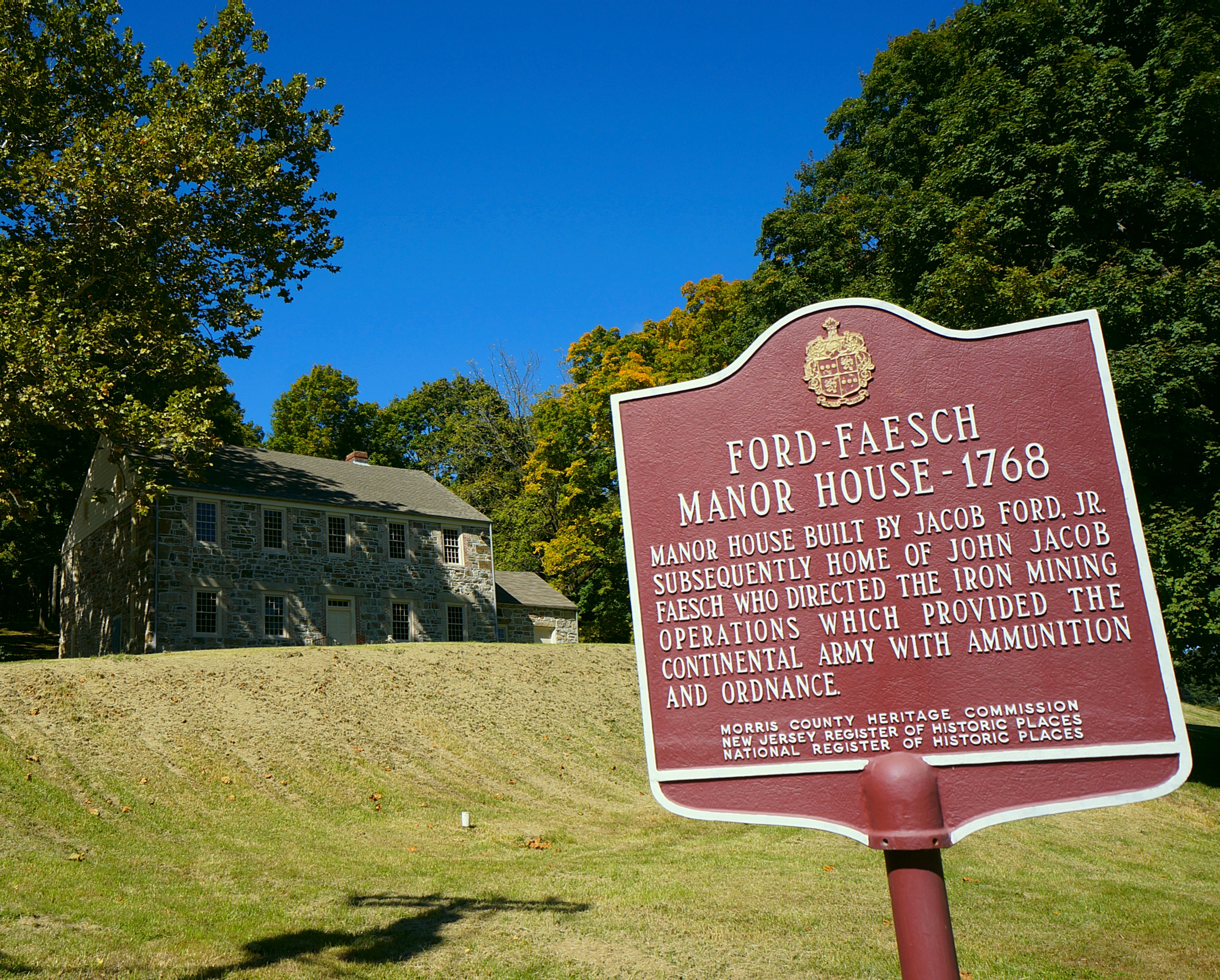
- Ford-Faesch House

- Seal
- Interactive map of Rockaway Township, New Jersey
- Location in Morris County Location in New Jersey Location in the United States
- Coordinates: 40.959048°N 74.49889°W
- Country: United States
- State: New Jersey
- County: Morris
- Incorporated: April 8, 1844

Government
  - Type: Faulkner Act (mayor–council)
  - Body: Township Council
  - Mayor: Joseph Jackson (R, unexpired term ends December 31, 2027)
  - Administrator: Lisa Palmieri
  - Municipal clerk: Adele Wadleigh

Area
  - Total: 45.89 sq mi (118.85 km^{2})
  - Land: 41.73 sq mi (108.09 km^{2})
  - Water: 4.16 sq mi (10.77 km^{2}) 9.06%
  - Rank: 39th of 565 in state 1st of 39 in county
- Elevation: 673 ft (205 m)

Population (2020)
  - Total: 25,341
  - Estimate (2023): 26,368
  - Rank: 103rd of 565 in state 4th of 39 in county
  - Density: 607.2/sq mi (234.4/km^{2})
  - Rank: 429th of 565 in state 32nd of 39 in county
- Time zone: UTC−05:00 (Eastern (EST))
  - Summer (DST): UTC−04:00 (Eastern (EDT))
- ZIP Code: 07866(Rockaway Borough); 07435 (Newfoundland); 07842 (Hibernia); 07801(Dover); 07885 (Wharton); 07005 (Boonton); 07405 (Butler); 07438 (Oak Ridge)
- Area code: 973
- FIPS code: 3402764080
- GNIS feature ID: 0882209
- Website: www.rockawaytownship.org

Rockaway Township is a township in Morris County, in the U.S. state of New Jersey. As of the 2020 United States census, the township's population was 25,341, an increase of 1,185 (+4.9%) from the 2010 census count of 24,156, which in turn reflected an increase of 1,226 (+5.3%) from the 22,930 counted in the 2000 census.

Rockaway Township was incorporated as a township by an act of the New Jersey Legislature on April 8, 1844, from portions of Hanover Township and Pequannock Township. Portions of the township were taken to form Rockaway Borough (June 19, 1894), Port Oram (June 26, 1895, now Wharton) and Denville Township (April 14, 1913). Portions of the township were annexed to Boonton Township in 1906 and to Rockaway Borough in 1908.

The township shares its name with the Rockaway River and the neighboring borough. The name is derived from a Native American term, variously said to mean "place of sands", "creek between two hills" or "bushy" / "difficult to cross".

A large part of the township consists of Picatinny Arsenal, a United States Army base that covers nearly 6,500 acres (2,600 ha) of the township (a portion of the facility is located in Jefferson Township), used mainly for the development of new weapons technologies.

== Geography ==
According to the United States Census Bureau, the township had a total area of 45.89 square miles (118.85 km^{2}), including 41.73 square miles (108.09 km^{2}) of land and 4.16 square miles (10.77 km^{2}) of water (9.06%).

Rockaway Township and its sister community, Rockaway Borough, and the area around the two municipalities are home to some scenic areas. These areas include lakes, rivers, and expansive ranges of mountains, covered with trees and wildlife and hiking trails, including Farny State Park, Wildcat Ridge WMA, Mount Hope Historical Park and Splitrock Reservoir.

Portions of the township are owned by the City of Newark, Essex County, for their Pequannock River Watershed, which provides water to the city from an area of 35,000 acres (14,000 ha) that also includes portions of Hardyston Township, Jefferson Township, Kinnelon, Vernon Township and West Milford. Newark's Pequannock Watershed is administered by the Newark Watershed Conservation and Development Corporation. The river keeper for the Pequannock River is the Pequannock River Coalition.

Two sites on the National Register of Historic Places are in Rockaway Township. Split Rock Furnace is a Civil War era iron ore furnace which is still intact. The Ford-Faesch Manor House, is a 1768 stone mansion that figured prominently during the Revolutionary War and in the 250-year history of Morris County iron industry.

Hibernia (with a 2020 Census population of 208), Lake Telemark (1,172), Mount Hope (2,930), and White Meadow Lake (with 8,710) are unincorporated communities and census-designated places (CDPs) located within Rockaway Township.

Other unincorporated communities, localities and place names located partially or completely within the township include Beach Glen, Deer Pond, Denmark, Bowlbyville, Durham Pond, Foxs Pond, Green Pond (a lake and an accompanying residential community, though it uses a Newfoundland address in West Milford), Hickory Hill, Hilltown, Lyonsville, Marcella, Meriden, Middle Forge, Middletown, Picatinny, Spicertown and Split Rock.

Splitrock Reservoir is 625 acres (2.53 km^{2}) of wilderness in Rockaway Township that straddles the township's border with Kinnelon. The New Jersey Department of Environmental Protection spent $3 million in 2015 to acquire a 1,500-acre (610 ha) buffer area around the reservoir, as part of an agreement under which Jersey City retains rights to use water from the reservoir and is responsible for maintenance of the dam at the site.

Rockaway Township borders the municipalities of Boonton Township, Denville Township, Dover, Jefferson Township, Kinnelon, Randolph, Rockaway and Wharton in Morris County; and West Milford in Passaic County.

Despite being the largest municipality in terms of area in Morris County and being the fourth-largest in population, Rockaway Township does not have its own designated ZIP code. The township is served by eight ZIP codes, seven from the surrounding municipalities and one of an unincorporated area within Rockaway Township. The ZIP codes for Rockaway Township are 07005 (Boonton), 07405 (Butler), 07435 (Newfoundland), 07438 (Oak Ridge), 07801 (Dover), 07842 (Hibernia), 07866 (Rockaway Borough) and 07885 (Wharton).

== Demographics ==
Historical population
Census	Pop.	Note	%±
1850	3,139		—
1860	3,551		13.1%
1870	6,445		81.5%
1880	7,366		14.3%
1890	6,033		−18.1%
1900	4,528	*	−24.9%
1910	4,835		6.8%
1920	3,505	*	−27.5%
1930	3,178		−9.3%
1940	2,423		−23.8%
1950	4,418		82.3%
1960	10,356		134.4%
1970	18,955		83.0%
1980	19,850		4.7%
1990	19,572		−1.4%
2000	22,930		17.2%
2010	24,156		5.3%
2020	25,341		4.9%
2023 (est.)	26,368		4.1%
Population sources: 1850–1920 1850–1870; 1850 1870 1880–1890; 1890–1910 1910–1930; 1940–2000 2000; 2010 2020 * = Lost territory in previous decade.

=== 2020 census ===
Rockaway township, Morris County, New Jersey – Racial and Ethnic Composition (NH = Non-Hispanic) Note: the US Census treats Hispanic/Latino as an ethnic category. This table excludes Latinos from the racial categories and assigns them to a separate category. Hispanics/Latinos may be of any race.
Race / Ethnicity	Pop 2010	Pop 2020	% 2010	% 2020
White alone (NH)	18,919	17,804	78.32%	70.26%
Black or African American alone (NH)	552	731	2.29%	2.88%
Native American or Alaska Native alone (NH)	12	10	0.05%	0.04%
Asian alone (NH)	1,605	1,918	6.64%	7.57%
Pacific Islander alone (NH)	4	10	0.02%	0.04%
Some Other Race alone (NH)	42	83	0.17%	0.33%
Mixed Race/Multi-Racial (NH)	317	790	1.31%	3.12%
Hispanic or Latino (any race)	2,705	3,995	11.20%	15.76%
Total	24,156	25,341	100.00%	100.00%

=== 2010 census ===
The 2010 United States census counted 24,156 people, 8,983 households, and 6,701 families in the township. The population density was 583.4 per square mile (225.3/km^{2}). There were 9,587 housing units at an average density of 231.6 per square mile (89.4/km^{2}). The racial makeup was 86.43% (20,878) White, 2.55% (616) Black or African American, 0.12% (28) Native American, 6.67% (1,611) Asian, 0.02% (4) Pacific Islander, 2.24% (541) from other races, and 1.98% (478) from two or more races. Hispanic or Latino of any race were 11.20% (2,705) of the population.

Of the 8,983 households, 34.4% had children under the age of 18; 62.9% were married couples living together; 8.6% had a female householder with no husband present and 25.4% were non-families. Of all households, 21.3% were made up of individuals and 9.9% had someone living alone who was 65 years of age or older. The average household size was 2.69 and the average family size was 3.14.

23.8% of the population were under the age of 18, 6.4% from 18 to 24, 24.8% from 25 to 44, 30.9% from 45 to 64, and 14.1% who were 65 years of age or older. The median age was 42.1 years. For every 100 females, the population had 95.2 males. For every 100 females ages 18 and older there were 91.5 males.

The Census Bureau's 2006–2010 American Community Survey showed that (in 2010 inflation-adjusted dollars) median household income was $95,530 (with a margin of error of +/− $5,122) and the median family income was $111,053 (+/− $5,557). Males had a median income of $75,475 (+/− $5,327) versus $52,586 (+/− $4,837) for females. The per capita income for the borough was $41,757 (+/− $1,898). About 0.8% of families and 1.4% of the population were below the poverty line, including 1.1% of those under age 18 and 2.0% of those age 65 or over.

=== 2000 census ===
As of the 2000 United States census there were 22,930 people, 8,108 households, and 6,380 families residing in the township. The population density was 535.5 inhabitants per square mile (206.8/km^{2}). There were 8,506 housing units at an average density of 198.7 per square mile (76.7/km^{2}). The racial makeup of the township was 88.86% White, 2.46% African American, 0.10% Native American, 5.65% Asian, 0.02% Pacific Islander, 1.60% from other races, and 1.31% from two or more races. Hispanic or Latino of any race were 6.28% of the population.

There were 8,108 households, out of which 40.2% had children under the age of 18 living with them, 68.5% were married couples living together, 7.6% had a female householder with no husband present, and 21.3% were non-families. 17.0% of all households were made up of individuals, and 5.6% had someone living alone who was 65 years of age or older. The average household size was 2.82 and the average family size was 3.21.

In the township the population was spread out, with 27.1% under the age of 18, 5.5% from 18 to 24, 32.9% from 25 to 44, 25.1% from 45 to 64, and 9.4% who were 65 years of age or older. The median age was 37 years. For every 100 females, there were 97.7 males. For every 100 females age 18 and over, there were 94.5 males.

The median income for a household in the township was $80,939, and the median income for a family was $89,281. Males had a median income of $58,027 versus $40,038 for females. The per capita income for the township was $33,184. About 1.4% of families and 2.4% of the population were below the poverty line, including 2.6% of those under age 18 and 3.6% of those age 65 or over.

== Economy ==
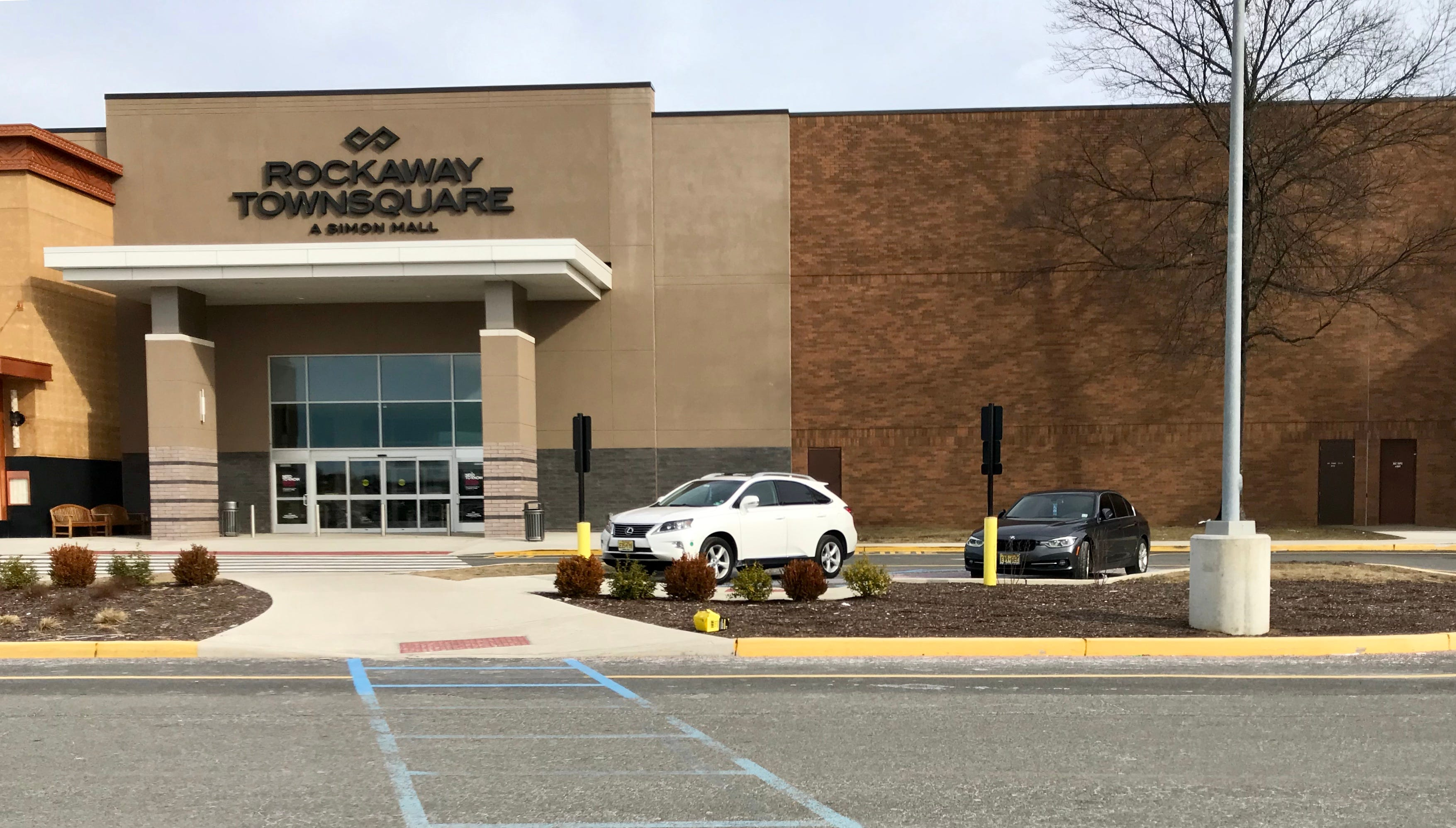
Rockaway Townsquare

Rockaway Townsquare is a super-regional mall anchored by Macy's, JCPenney, and Raymour & Flanigan with a gross leasable area of 1,248,000 square feet (115,900 m^{2}), placing it in the top ten among the largest shopping malls in New Jersey.

Picatinny Arsenal, a military research and manufacturing facility, dates back to 1880 when it was established as the Dover Powder Depot, before being renamed just days later as the Picatinny Powder Depot. With 5,000 employees and covering 6,500 acres (2,600 ha), Picatinny Arsenal is the Joint Center of Excellence for Armaments and Munitions for the United States Armed Forces.

== Sports ==
In 2011, the North Jersey Lakers began playing in the Eastern Basketball Alliance, a now-defunct semi-professional men's winter basketball league.

== Local Media ==
Rockaway News is a Rockaway, NJ News website. Local resource for current news and community updates.

== Government ==
=== Local government ===
Rockaway Township is governed within the Faulkner Act (formally known as the Optional Municipal Charter Law) under the Mayor-Council system of municipal government (Plan F), implemented based on the recommendations of a Charter Study Commission as of January 1, 1968. The township is one of 71 municipalities (of the 564) statewide that use this form of government. The governing body is comprised of the mayor and the township council. The mayor is directly elected by the voters. The township council is comprised of nine members, with one member elected from each of six wards and three elected on an at-large basis. The members of the governing body are elected to staggered four-year terms of office on a partisan basis in odd-numbered years as part of the November general election, with the six ward seats up for vote together and then the three at-large and the mayoral seat up for vote together two years later.

As of 2026, the Mayor of Rockaway Township is Republican Joseph Jackson, whose term expires on December 31, 2027. Members of the Township Council are Council President Howard Morrison (R, 2027; At-large), Council Vice President Jonathan Sackett (D, 2029; Ward 4), Sophia E. Freire (D, 2029; Ward 3), Emanuel "Manny" Friedlander (D, 2029; Ward 5), Tucker Kelley (R, 2029; Ward 6), John "Jack" Quinn (R, 2029; Ward 2), Susan Fahrman Royek (D, 2029; Ward 1), Adam Salberg (R, 2027; At-large) and Pawel Wojtowicz (R, 2027; At-large).

=== Federal, state, and county representation ===
Rockaway Township is located in the 11th Congressional District and is part of New Jersey's 25th state legislative district.

For the 119th United States Congress, New Jersey's 11th congressional district is represented by Analilia Mejia (D, Glen Ridge) who was elected in a 2026 special election to serve for the remainder of the Congress following the resignation Mikie Sherrill (D, Montclair), who was elected Governor of New Jersey in 2025. New Jersey is represented in the United States Senate by Democrats Cory Booker (Newark, term ends 2027) and Andy Kim (Moorestown, term ends 2031).

For the 2026–2027 session, the 25th legislative district of the New Jersey Legislature is represented in the State Senate by Anthony M. Bucco (R, Boonton Township) and in the General Assembly by Aura K. Dunn (R, Mendham Borough) and Marisa Sweeney (D, Morristown).

Morris County is governed by a Board of County Commissioners comprised of seven members who are elected at-large in partisan elections to three-year terms on a staggered basis, with either one or three seats up for election each year as part of the November general election. Actual day-to-day operation of departments is supervised by County Administrator Deena Leary.

As of 2026, Morris County's Commissioners (with all terms ending December 31) are Director Stephen H. Shaw (R, Mountain Lakes, 2027), Deputy Director John Krickus (R, Washington Township, 2027), Douglas Cabana (R, Boonton Township, 2028), Thomas J. Mastrangelo (R, Montville, 2028), Christine Myers (R, Harding Township, 2028), Tayfun Selen (R, Chatham Township, 2026), and Deborah Smith (R, Denville Township, 2027).

The county's constitutional officers are County Clerk Ann F. Grossi (R, Parsippany–Troy Hills, 2028), Sheriff James M. Gannon (R, Boonton Township, 2025) and Surrogate Heather Darling (R, Roxbury, 2029).

=== Politics ===
United States presidential election results for Rockaway Township 2024 2020 2016 2012 2008 2004
Year	Republican		Democratic		Third party(ies)	
Year	No.	%	No.	%	No.	%
2024	7,918	50.40%	7,483	47.63%	309	1.97%
2020	7,569	47.53%	8,068	50.66%	288	1.81%
2016	6,790	51.51%	5,896	44.73%	496	3.76%
2012	6,410	52.87%	5,562	45.87%	153	1.26%
2008	6,770	52.47%	5,998	46.49%	134	1.04%
2004	6,934	55.97%	5,368	43.33%	87	0.70%

As of March 2011, there were a total of 16,022 registered voters in Rockaway Township, of which 3,861 (24.1%) were registered as Democrats, 5,481 (34.2%) were registered as Republicans and 6,668 (41.6%) were registered as Unaffiliated. There were 12 voters registered as Libertarians or Greens.

In the 2012 presidential election, Republican Mitt Romney received 52.9% of the vote (6,410 cast), ahead of Democrat Barack Obama with 45.9% (5,562 votes), and other candidates with 1.3% (153 votes), among the 12,198 ballots cast by the township's 16,865 registered voters (73 ballots were spoiled), for a turnout of 72.3%. In the 2008 presidential election, Republican John McCain received 52.2% of the vote (6,770 cast), ahead of Democrat Barack Obama with 46.3% (5,998 votes) and other candidates with 1.0% (134 votes), among the 12,958 ballots cast by the township's 16,558 registered voters, for a turnout of 78.3%. In the 2004 presidential election, Republican George W. Bush received 55.9% of the vote (6,934 ballots cast), outpolling Democrat John Kerry with 43.3% (5,368 votes) and other candidates with 0.5% (87 votes), among the 12,411 ballots cast by the township's 16,057 registered voters, for a turnout percentage of 77.3.

Gubernatorial election results for Rockaway Township
Year	Republican		Democratic		Third party(ies)	
Year	No.	%	No.	%	No.	%
2025	5,831	46.45%	6,685	53.25%	38	0.30%
2021	5,256	54.31%	4,351	44.96%	70	0.72%
2017	4,014	51.36%	3,635	46.51%	166	2.12%
2013	5,071	66.69%	2,396	31.51%	137	1.80%
2009	4,855	56.53%	2,930	34.12%	803	9.35%
2005	4,122	52.55%	3,469	44.22%	253	3.23%

In the 2013 gubernatorial election, Republican Chris Christie received 66.7% of the vote (5,071 cast), ahead of Democrat Barbara Buono with 31.5% (2,396 votes), and other candidates with 1.8% (137 votes), among the 7,726 ballots cast by the township's 16,708 registered voters (122 ballots were spoiled), for a turnout of 46.2%. In the 2009 gubernatorial election, Republican Chris Christie received 55.9% of the vote (4,855 ballots cast), ahead of Democrat Jon Corzine with 33.8% (2,930 votes), Independent Chris Daggett with 8.6% (750 votes) and other candidates with 0.6% (53 votes), among the 8,681 ballots cast by the township's 16,190 registered voters, yielding a 53.6% turnout.

United States Senate election results for Rockaway Township1
Year	Republican		Democratic		Third party(ies)	
Year	No.	%	No.	%	No.	%
2024	7,330	49.82%	7,051	47.92%	332	2.26%
2018	5,947	52.67%	4,975	44.06%	370	3.28%
2012	5,725	51.64%	5,213	47.02%	149	1.34%
2006	4,205	54.22%	3,396	43.79%	155	2.00%

United States Senate election results for Rockaway Township2
Year	Republican		Democratic		Third party(ies)	
Year	No.	%	No.	%	No.	%
2020	7,380	47.90%	7,795	50.59%	232	1.51%
2014	3,267	55.01%	2,592	43.64%	80	1.35%
2013	2,790	53.98%	2,330	45.08%	49	0.95%
2008	6,110	52.86%	5,244	45.37%	204	1.77%

== Education ==
The Rockaway Township Public Schools serves students in kindergarten through eighth grade. As of the 2022–23 school year, the district, comprised of six schools, had an enrollment of 2,386 students and 248.2 classroom teachers (on an FTE basis), for a student–teacher ratio of 9.6:1. Schools in the district (with 2022–23 enrollment data from the National Center for Education Statistics) are Birchwood Elementary School with 279 students in grades K-5, Catherine A. Dwyer Elementary School with 322 students in grades K-5, Katherine D. Malone Elementary School with 259 students in grades K-5, Dennis B. O'Brien Elementary School with 275 students in grades PreK-5, Stony Brook Elementary School with 391 students in grades K-5 and Copeland Middle School with 853 students in grades 6-8.

Public school students in ninth through twelfth grades attend either Morris Hills High School (those living in the White Meadow Lake section and other southern portions of the township) or Morris Knolls High School (the remainder of the township). Morris Hills (located in Rockaway Borough) also serves students from Wharton and some from Rockaway Borough (those mostly north of Route 46); Morris Knolls (located in Denville) serves all students from Denville and portions of Rockaway Borough (those mostly south of Route 46). As of the 2022–23 school year, Morris Hills High School had an enrollment of 1,187 students and 117.3 classroom teachers (on an FTE basis), for a student–teacher ratio of 10.1:1, while Morris Knolls had an enrollment of 1,447 students and 130.9 classroom teachers (on an FTE basis) and a student–teacher ratio of 11.1:1. The Academy for Mathematics, Science, and Engineering, a magnet high school program that is part of the Morris County Vocational School District is jointly operated on the Morris Hills campus. The two high schools are part of the Morris Hills Regional High School District.

== Transportation ==
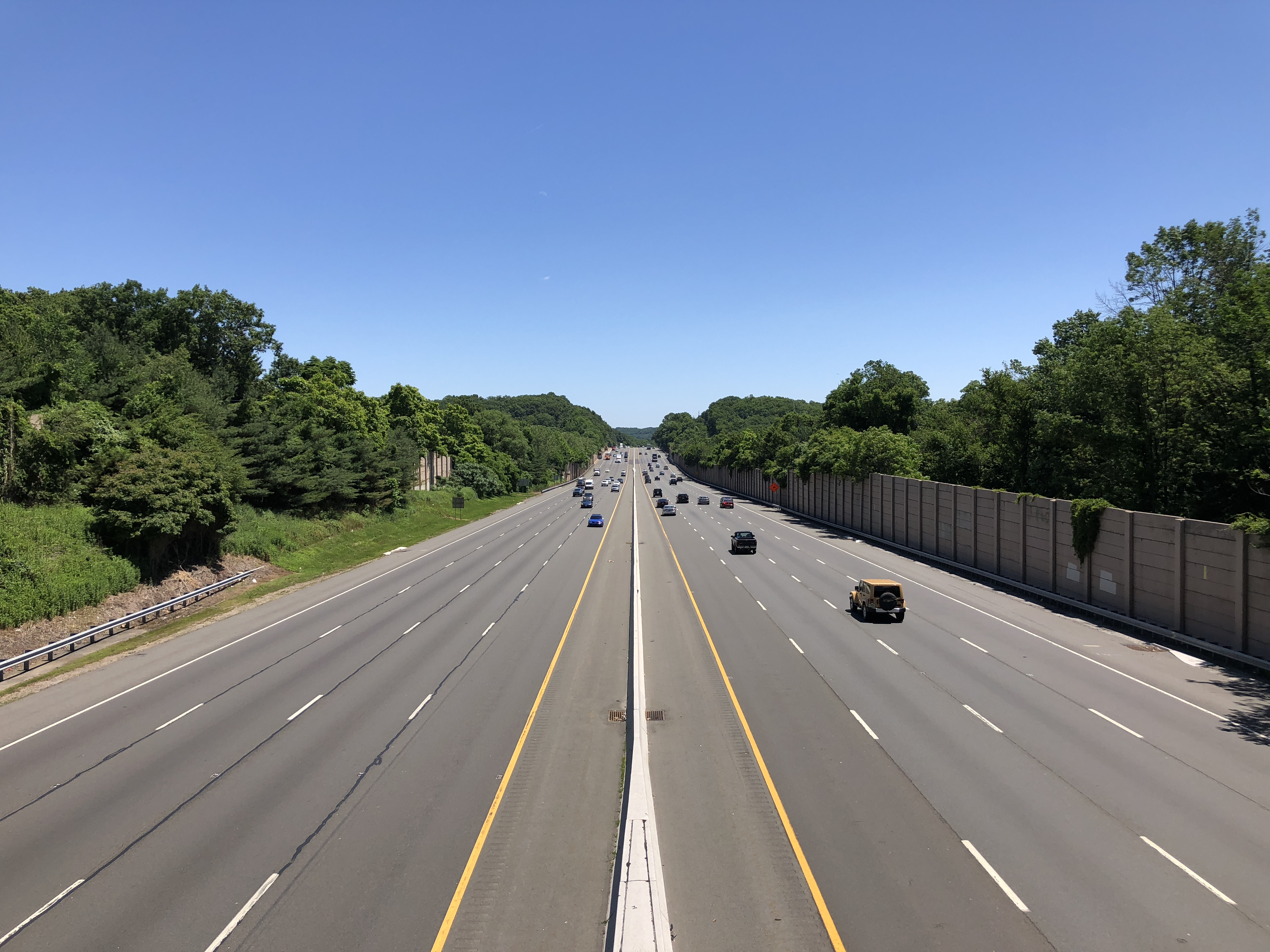
Interstate 80 eastbound in Rockaway Township

=== Roads and highways ===
As of May 2010, the township had a total of 122.69 miles (197.45 km) of roadways, of which 101.06 miles (162.64 km) were maintained by the municipality, 3.53 miles (5.68 km) by Morris County and 2.19 miles (3.52 km) by the New Jersey Department of Transportation.

Interstate 80 passes through the township, including exits 35 and 37. U.S. Route 46 cuts through the southernmost area of the township, while Route 15 clips the southwestern portion of the township. County Route 513 traverses a total of 14 miles (23 km) north-south across the township.

=== Public transportation ===
NJ Transit train service does not stop in the township, but is accessible at the Denville station on both the Morris & Essex Lines and the Montclair-Boonton Line.

NJ Transit bus service is provided on the 880 local route, which replaced service that had been provided up to 2010 on the MCM10 route.

NJ Transit eliminated service on the MCM5 and MCM7 routes as part of budget cuts.

Lakeland Bus Lines offers bus service from the Rockaway Townsquare Mall to the Port Authority Bus Terminal in Midtown Manhattan.

== Fire department ==
There are five companies of the Rockaway Township Fire Department. Each company is all-volunteer and provides emergency medical services in addition to fire protection. The five stations are:

- Hibernia Company #1
- Mount Hope Company #2
- Marcella Company #3, covering the northern portion of the township
- Birchwood Company #4 covers the area around the Rockaway Townsquare Mall
- White Meadow Lake Company #5, covers the southern portion of the township

== Popular culture ==
- The 2003 independent film, The Station Agent, was filmed at various locations in the northern part of the township and elsewhere in the surrounding Morris County area.

== Notable people ==
People who were born in, residents of, or otherwise closely associated with Rockaway Township include:

- Lou Benfatti (born 1971), former defensive tackle for the New York Jets (1994–1996)
- William E. Bishop (1932–2003), politician who served as mayor of Rockaway Township and represented the 25th Legislative District in the New Jersey General Assembly from 1982 to 1984
- Neal Casal (1968–2019), musician/photographer, member of Ryan Adams and the Cardinals
- Silas Duncan (1788–1834), recognized for his service in the United States Navy during the War of 1812 for his actions at the Battle of Lake Champlain
- Harry L. Ettlinger (1926–2018), one of the Monuments Men during World War II whose efforts were portrayed on film in The Monuments Men
- Russ Flanagan (1974–2008), journalist
- Frank Herbert (1931–2018), English teacher and politician who served in the New Jersey Senate from 1978 to 1982
- Thomas J. Hillery (1871–1920), President of the New Jersey Senate
- Lawrence Low (1920–1996), sailor who received a gold medal in the star class with the boat Kathleen at the 1956 Summer Olympics in Melbourne.
- Clifford Meth (born 1961), author and editor, lived in Rockaway from 1963 to 1980 and often references the town as the home of his fictional character "Hank Magitz"
- E. Bertram Mott (1879–1961), Chairman of the New Jersey Republican State Committee from 1927 to 1934 who served as County Clerk of Morris County for more than 50 years
- Raymond T. Odierno (1954–2021), Lieutenant General, United States Army and Commander US III Corps. A key officer in Operation Iraqi Freedom Former Chief of Staff of the Army.
- Robert A. Roe (1924–2014), politician who represented New Jersey in the United States House of Representatives from 1969 to 1993
