= Cedar Lake =

Cedar Lake may refer to:

== Lakes ==
=== Canada ===
- Cedar Lake (Manitoba)
- Cedar Lake (Ontario)

=== United States ===
- Cedar Lake, Alabama, community established outside Decatur for African Americans
- Cedar Lake (California)
- Cedar Lake (Illinois)
- Cedar Lake (Maine)
- Cedar Lake (Aitkin County, Minnesota)
- Cedar Lake (Martin County, Minnesota)
- Cedar Lake (McLeod and Meeker counties, Minnesota)
- Cedar Lake (Minneapolis), Minnesota
- Cedar Lake (Scott County, Minnesota)
- Cedar Lake (Morris County, New Jersey)
- Cedar Lake (New York)
- Cedar Lake (Le Flore County, Oklahoma)
- Cedar Lake, former name of Chester Morse Lake in Washington
- Cedar Lake (St. Croix County, Wisconsin)

== Places ==
=== United States ===
- Cedar Lake, Indiana
- Cedar Lake Township, Scott County, Minnesota
- Cedar Lake, Minnesota
- Cedar Lake, New Jersey
- Cedar Lake, Oklahoma
- Cedar Lake, Texas
- Cedar Lake, Wisconsin
- Cedar Lake (community), Wisconsin

== See also ==
- Cedar Lakes, several small water bodies in Ontario, Canada
- Big Cedar Lake, Wisconsin, United States
- Cedar Lake Trail, a path in Minneapolis, Minnesota, United States
- Cedar Lake Contemporary Ballet, New York City, New York, United States
- Cedar Lake Speedway, a track in Wisconsin, United States
- Cedar Pond (disambiguation)
- Little Cedar Lake, a water body in Quebec, Canada
- Little Cedar Lake (Wisconsin)
