= Cedar Lake (Minnesota) =

A number of lakes in Minnesota are called Cedar Lake:

- Cedar Lake (Minneapolis)
- Cedar Lake (Aitkin County, Minnesota)
- Cedar Lake (Martin County, Minnesota)
- Cedar Lake (McLeod and Meeker counties, Minnesota)
- Cedar Lake, a lake in Rice County, Minnesota
- Cedar Lake (Scott County, Minnesota)

== See also ==
- Cedar Lake (disambiguation)
