= Batchawana =

Batchawana can refer to the following places in Algoma District, Ontario, Canada:

- Batchawana Bay
  - Batchawana Bay, Ontario, community on the bay
  - Batchawana Bay Provincial Park
  - Batchawana Island, in Batchawana Bay
- Batchawana Mountain
- Batchawana River
  - Batchawana River Provincial Park

== See also ==
- Batchewana First Nation
