= Estling Lake =

Lake in New Jersey, United States

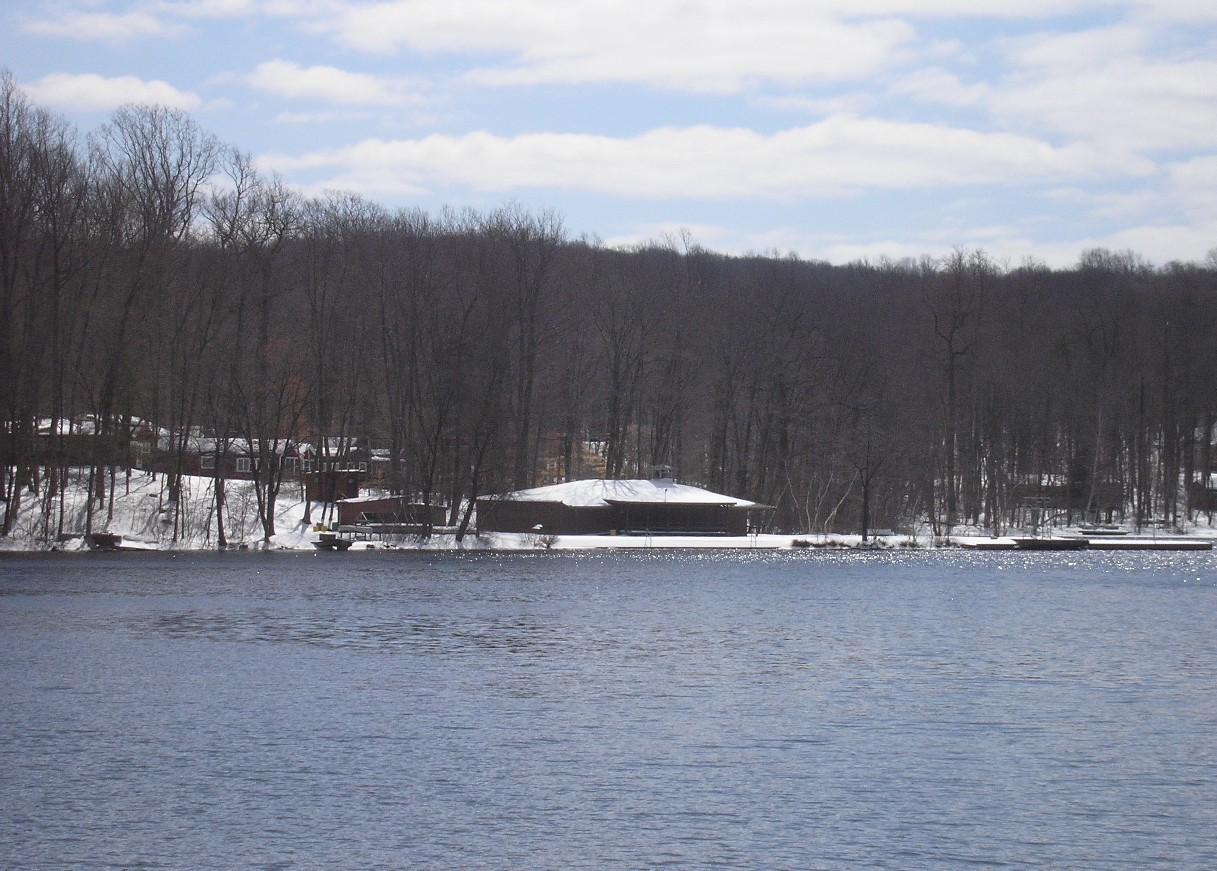
- Lake with clubhouse and beach (Winter 2007)

- Location within New Jersey Location within the United States
- Location: Denville Township, New Jersey
- Coordinates: 40.879338°N 74.49887°W
- Basin countries: United States
- Surface elevation: 502 ft. (153 m)

Estling Lake is in Denville Township, New Jersey with a small private summer community of approximately 60 houses and is owned by the Estling Lake Corporation. The lake is fed by Den Brook and drains over a dam into Indian Lake. New Jersey Transit's Montclair-Boonton Line runs along the north shore of the lake.

The lake's residents participate in a variety of sporting events with other nearby lakes such as Parsippany, White Meadow, Rainbow, Arrowhead, Mountain, Indian, Intervalve, Telemark, Rock Ridge, Lake Valhalla, and Cedar known as the "Hub Lakes." An ice house existed on the lake until it was destroyed in the early twentieth century.
