= Carp River (Algoma District) =

River in Ontario, Canada

- Location of the mouth of the Carp River in Ontario

Location
- Country: Canada
- Province: Ontario
- Region: Northeastern Ontario
- District: Algoma
- Part: Unorganized, North

Physical characteristics
- Source: Unnamed lake
  - coordinates: 47°03′26″N 84°32′54″W
  - elevation: 545 m (1,788 ft)
- Mouth: Batchawana Bay on Lake Superior
  - coordinates: 46°56′42″N 84°34′48″W
  - elevation: 180 m (590 ft)

Basin features
- River system: Great Lakes Basin
- Tributaries
  - left: East Carp River

The Carp River is a river in the Unorganized North Part of Algoma District in Northeastern Ontario, Canada. The river is in the Great Lakes Basin and is a tributary of Lake Superior.

== Course ==
The river begins at an unnamed lake in geographic Nicolet Township and heads west, then turns south, enters geographic Palmer Township, flows through the Cedar Lakes, and takes in the left tributary East Carp River. It continues south, passes into geographic Fisher Township, takes in the left tributary Carp Creek arriving from Carp Lake, passes under Ontario Highway 17, and reaches Batchawana Bay on Lake Superior.

== Recreation ==
The mouth of the Carp River is at the west end of Batchawana Bay Provincial Park.

== Tributaries ==
- Carp Creek (left)
- East Carp River (left)

== Sources ==
- Map 12 (PDF) (Map). 1 : 1,600,000. Official road map of Ontario. Ministry of Transportation of Ontario. 2010-01-01.
- Restructured municipalities - Ontario map #4 (Map). Restructuring Maps of Ontario. Ontario Ministry of Municipal Affairs and Housing. 2006. Archived from the original on 2014-04-10.
