= Cedar Pond =

Cedar Pond is the name of some bodies of water in the United States:

- Cedar Pond (Massachusetts), in Lakeville, Massachusetts
- Cedar Pond (New Hampshire), in Milan, New Hampshire
- Cedar Pond (New Jersey), In West Milford, New Jersey

== See also ==
- Cedar Lake (disambiguation)
