= War of 1812 campaigns =

Location map of the War of 1812

The following is a synopsis of the land campaigns of the War of 1812.

== Canada, 18 June 1812 – 17 February 1815 ==
This campaign includes all operations in the Canada-US border region except the battle of Chippewa and Lundy's Lane. The invasion and conquest of western Canada was a major objective of the United States in the War of 1812. Among the significant causes of the war were the continuing clash of British and American interests in the Northwest Territory and the desire of frontier expansionists to seize Canada as a bargaining chip while Great Britain was preoccupied with the Napoleonic Wars.

In the first phase of the war along the border in 1812, the United States suffered a series of reverses. Fort Mackinac fell (6 August), Fort Dearborn was evacuated (15 August), and Fort Detroit surrendered without a fight (16 August). American attempts to invade Canada across the Niagara Peninsula (October) and toward Montreal (November) failed completely.

Brig. Gen. William Henry Harrison's move to recapture Detroit was repulsed (January 1813), but he checked British efforts to penetrate deeper into the region at the west end of Lake Erie, during the summer of 1813. Meanwhile, in April 1813, Maj. Gen. Henry Dearborn's expedition captured Fort Toronto and partially burned York, capital of Upper Canada. On 27 May, Brig. Gen. Jacob Brown repelled a British assault on Sackett's Harbor, New York.

An American force led by Col. Winfield Scott seized Fort George and the town of Queenston across the Niagara (May–June 1813), but the British regained control of this area in December 1813. A two-pronged American drive on Montreal from Sackett's Harbor and Plattsburgh, New York in the fall of 1813 ended in a complete fiasco. Commodore Oliver Hazard Perry defeated the British fleet on Lake Erie (10 September 1813), opening the way for Harrison's victory at the Thames River (5 October), which reestablished American control over the Detroit Area.

A Campaign Streamer, which was embroidered Canada, 18 June 1812 – 17 February 1815 was awarded for this campaign.

== Chippewa ==
An American advance from Plattsburgh in March 1814, led by Maj. Gen. James Wilkinson, was checked just beyond the border, but on 3 July 500 men under General Brown seized Fort Erie across the Niagara in a coordinated attack with Commodore Isaac Chauncey's fleet designed to wrest control of Lake Ontario from the British. In subsequent troop maneuvers in the Niagara region, Brig. Gen. Winfield Scott's brigade (1,300 men) of Brown's command was unexpectedly confronted by a large British force while preparing for an Independence Day parade (5 July 1814) near the Chippewa River. Scott's well-trained troops broke the enemy line with a skillfully executed charge, sending the survivors into a hasty retreat. British losses were 137 killed and 304 wounded; American, 48 killed and 227 wounded.

== Lundy's Lane ==
After Chippewa, Brown's force advanced to Queenstown, but soon abandoned a proposed attack on Forts George and Niagara when Chauncey's fleet failed to cooperate in the operation. Instead, on 24–25 July 1814, Brown moved back to the Chippewa preparatory to a cross-country march along Lundy's Lane to the west end of Lake Ontario. Unknown to Brown, the British had concentrated about 2,200 troops in the vicinity of Lundy's Lane and 1,500 more in Forts George and Niagara. On 25 July, Scott's brigade, moving again towards Queenstown in an effort to draw off a British detachment threatening Brown's line of communications on the American side of the Niagara, ran into the enemy contingents at the junction of Queenstown Road and Lundy's Lane. The ensuing battle, which eventually involved all of Brown's force (2,900 men) and some 3,000 British, was fiercely fought and neither side gained a clear cut victory. The Americans retired to the Chippewa unmolested, but the battle terminated Brown's invasion of Canada. Casualties were heavy on both sides, the British losing 878 and the Americans 854 in killed and wounded; both Brown and Scott were wounded as was the British commander Major General Drummond and British Lieutenant General Riall was wounded and captured. British siege of Fort Erie (2 August – 21 September 1814) failed to drive the Americans from that outpost on Canadian soil, but on 5 November they withdrew voluntarily. Commodore Thomas Macdonough's victory over the British fleet on Lake Champlain (11 September 1814) compelled Sir George Prevost, Governor General of Canada, to call off his attack on Plattsburgh with 11,000 troops.

== Bladensburg ==
After the surrender of Napoleon, the British dispatched Maj. Gen. Robert Ross from France on 27 June 1814, with 4,000 veterans to raid key points on the American coast. Ross landed at the mouth of the Patuxent River in Maryland with Washington as his objective on 19 August and marched as far as Upper Marlboro, Maryland (22 August) without meeting resistance. Meanwhile, Brig. Gen. William Winder, in command of the Potomac District, had assembled a mixed force of about 5,000 men near Bladensburg, including militia, regulars, and some 400 sailors from Commodore Joshua Barney's gunboat flotilla, which had been destroyed to avoid capture by the British fleet. In spite of a considerable advantage in numbers and position, the Americans were easily routed by Ross' force. British losses were about 249 killed and wounded; the Americans lost about 100 killed and wounded, and 100 captured. British detachments entered the city and burned the Capitol and other public buildings (24–25 August) in what was later announced as retaliation for the American destruction at York.

== Fort McHenry ==
While the British marched on Washington, Baltimore had time to hastily strengthen its defenses. Maj. Gen. Samuel Smith had about 9,000 militia, including 1,000 in Fort McHenry guarding the harbor. On 12 September 1814, the British landed at North Point about 14 miles below the city, where their advance was momentarily checked by 3,200 Maryland Militiamen. Thirty-nine British (including General Ross) were killed and 251 wounded at a cost of 24 Americans killed, 139 wounded, and 50 taken prisoner. After their fleet failed to reduce Fort McHenry by bombardment and boat attack (night of 13–14 September), the British decided that a land attack on the rather formidable fortifications defending the city would be too costly and, on 14 October, sailed for Jamaica. Francis Scott Key, after observing the unsuccessful British bombardment of Fort McHenry, was inspired to compose the verses of "The Star-Spangled Banner."

== New Orleans ==
On 20 December 1814, a force of about 10,000 British troops, assembled in Jamaica, landed unopposed at the west end of Lake Borgne, some 15 miles from New Orleans, preparatory to an attempt to seize the city and secure control of the lower Mississippi Valley. Advanced elements pushed quickly toward the river, reaching Villere's Plantation on the left bank, 10 miles below New Orleans, on 23 December. In a swift counter-action, Maj. Gen. Andrew Jackson, American commander in the South, who had only arrived in the city on 1 December, made a night attack on the British (23–24 December) with some 20,000 men supported by fire from the gunboat Carolina. The British advance was checked, giving Jackson time to fall back to a dry canal about five miles south of New Orleans, where he built a breastworks about a mile long, with the right flank on the river and the left in a cypress swamp. A composite force of about 3,500 militia, regulars, sailors, and others manned the American main line, with another 1,000 in reserve. A smaller force—perhaps 1,000 militia—under Brig. Gen. David Morgan defended the right bank of the river. Maj. Gen. Sir Edward Pakenham, brother-in-law of the Duke of Wellington, arrived on 25 December to command the British operation. He entrenched his troops and, on 1 January 1815, fought an artillery duel in which the Americans outgunned the British artillerists. Finally, at dawn on 8 January, Pakenham attempted a frontal assault on Jackson's breastworks with 5,300 men, simultaneously sending a smaller force across the river to attack Morgan's defenses. The massed fires of Jackson's troops, protected by earthworks reinforced with cotton bales, wrought havoc among Pakenham's regulars as they advanced across the open ground in front of the American lines. In less than a half-hour, the attack was repulsed. The British lost 291 killed, including Pakenham, 1,262 wounded, and 48 prisoners; American losses on both sides of the river were only 13 killed, 39 wounded, and 19 prisoners. The surviving British troops withdrew to Lake Borgne and reembarked on 27 January for Mobile, where they defeated a US Garrison at the Second Battle of Fort Bowyer. On 14 February, they learned that the Treaty of Ghent, ending the war, had been signed on 24 December 1814.
