= Cedar Pond (New Jersey) =

Reservoir in New Jersey, United States

- Location within New Jersey Location within the United States
- Location: West Milford, New Jersey
- Coordinates: 41°06′30″N 74°25′35″W
- Basin countries: United States
- Surface area: 11 acres (4.5 ha)
- Surface elevation: 1,119 ft (341 m)

Cedar Pond is a reservoir in West Milford, New Jersey.

== See also ==
- Cedar Lake, New Jersey
