= Russ Flanagan =

American journalist

Russell J. Flanagan
- Born: May 21, 1974; Denville, New Jersey
- Died: February 5, 2008 (aged 33); Whitehall Township, Pennsylvania
- Occupation: Journalist
- Writing career
- Pen name: Russ Flanagan

Russell J. Flanagan (May 21, 1974 – February 5, 2008), better known as Russ Flanagan, was a journalist for The Express-Times in Easton, Pennsylvania, and The New Jersey Herald in Newton, New Jersey. He covered Northampton County courts for the last three years of his career. Flanagan was found dead in his Whitehall Township apartment at age 33.

== Biography ==
=== Early life ===
Russ Flanagan was born May 21, 1974, in Denville, New Jersey, to William and Carol Flanagan of Rockaway Township. He had one brother named Glenn, one sister named Danielle Grayson and a brother in-law Richard Grayson. He had two nephews, Derek and Liam and one niece Natalie. Flanagan lived in Rockaway Township for most of his life, before moving to Whitehall Township in 2003. He attended Morris County College in Randolph Township, New Jersey, then studied journalism at William Paterson University in Wayne, where he received his bachelor's degree.

=== Journalism career ===
Flanagan interviewing New Jersey Governor Jon Corzine.

Flanagan worked at The New Jersey Herald from late 2000 to early 2003, where he covered politics and county government. One of the most significant stories he covered was a gas explosion at Able Energy in Newton on March 14, 2003, which prompted weeks of reporting on the faulty gas transfer that caused it. Upon leaving the Herald on April 23, 2003, the Sussex County Freeholders awarded Flanagan a certificate in recognition of his county government coverage. It was the only certificate of its kind the freeholders have awarded to date.

Flanagan joined The Express-Times in April 2003 as a police reporter. In October 2005, he was reassigned to the Northampton County Courthouse, where he covered trials, sentencing, hearings, civil litigation and the district attorney's office.

=== Death ===
Co-workers at The Express-Times became concerned when Flanagan failed to appear to cover a murder trial on February 5, 2008. When he could not be reached all day, an editor drove to his Whitehall apartment and called the police, who found Flanagan dead in the apartment. After more than a month, an autopsy concluded the death was due to an unknown cardiac condition which led to a hardening of the arteries and a build-up of plaque that caused decreased blood flow.

Funeral services were held February 11 at the St. Clement Pope & Martyr Church in Rockaway Township, New Jersey. On February 15, about 250 family members, colleagues and friends gathered at the Northampton County Courthouse to remember Flanagan. Speakers at the service memorial service included his brother-in-law Richard Grayson, Northampton County Judge Paula Roscioli, Express-Times City Editor Eileen Holliday, and Express-Times Editor Joseph P. Owens. Owens announced that the newspaper's internship would be renamed the Russell J. Flanagan Memorial Scholarship.

In an Express-Times article about Flanagan, Owens recalled: "He was the kind of guy -- rock-solid reliable -- that if he was working a shift, you knew anything that came along would be handled. He was a veteran newsman who understood how to get the job done."
