= John Lees (artist) =

American painter

- Born: February 3, 1943 (age 83); Denville, New Jersey, U.S.
- Known for: Painting
- Awards: Francis J. Greenburger Award (2005); American Academy of Arts and Letters, Hassam, Speicher, Betts and Symonds Art Purchase Award (2010); John Simon Guggenheim Memorial Foundation Grant (1993)

John Lees (born February 3, 1943) is an American contemporary expressionist artist who works primarily in painting.

Lees received the 2005 Francis J. Greenburger Award and has also received the American Academy of Arts and Letters, Hassam, Speicher, Betts and Symonds Art Purchase Award in 2010, the John Simon Guggenheim Memorial Foundation Grant in 1993 and the National Endowment for the Arts Fellowship Grant in 1989. His paintings are included in the public collections of the Museum of Modern Art, the Fogg Art Museum, The New Museum, the Detroit Institute of Arts, the Kemper Museum of Contemporary Art, the Arkansas Art Center, the Santa Barbara Museum of Art, and the Tucson Museum of Art.

Lees also served as an art professor for 40 years at the New York Studio School of Drawing, Painting and Sculpture (1988–2011), the School of Visual Arts (1987–2005), Sarah Lawrence College (2000–2003), State University of New York at New Paltz (1996–2000), and Mt. San Antonio College (1971–1981).

== Education and background ==
Lees was born in Denville, New Jersey in 1943. He moved to Los Angeles in 1950 with his family. After attending Los Angeles City College from 1961 to 1963, he studied at the Otis Art Institute from 1963 to 1967. He received a Bachelor of Fine Arts degree from Otis in 1964 and a Master of Fine Arts in 1967.

== Painting and exhibitions ==
In 1975, Lees had a solo exhibition in Santa Barbara, California. Two years later, in 1977, Lees had a solo exhibition New York City. His second solo exhibition in New York followed in 1980. During this period, Lees also had solo exhibitions in Detroit (1979) and in San Francisco (1981). In 1981, Lees moved to New York City. He presented his third solo exhibition in New York in 1983. In its review of Lees' 1983 exhibition, The New York Times wrote:

John Lees's landscapes and heads are almost incidental to his technique. This, in turn, is less a matter of applying oil paint than of allowing it to accumulate until the canvas looks like a fragment of some ancient, lumpy wall. ... The work is on the precious side and might pall if administered in large doses, but there's scant danger of that, given the artist's glacial rate of production.

In the mid-1980s, Lees became associated with Hirschl & Adler Modern in New York. He presented his first solo exhibition at Hirschl & Adler in 1986 with additional solo exhibitions there in 1989, 1993, 1996, 1998, and 1999. During this period, Lees also had solo exhibitions in London, Chicago, Boston (1992, 1997, 2003, and 2005), and Italy. In describing Lees' 1996 show, art critic Holland Cotter described Lees' work as "intense" and "surprisingly graceful" and wrote that the artist's "clotted and encrusted brown pigments, look as if they were lifted straight from the earth," but with each image seemingly "packed with references and energies beyond the naturalistic." Following a 2007 exhibition, a reviewer for The New York Times wrote:

The artist John Lees is one of the most accomplished expressionist painters of his generation. He is also one of the most under-recognized, at least when it comes to inclusion within museum collections and the sort of group exhibitions that help build a reputation. He has the distinction, however, of having exhibited continuously in private galleries since 1969.

In 1987, Money magazine reported that Lees' 69-inch-by-89-inch painting of an armchair, which sold in 1974 for $1,800, was valued at $30,000.

In 1990, Lees moved to Leeds, New York. Lees and his wife, Ruth, who is also a painter, have maintained their studio and home there since that time. One of the unusual characteristics of Lees' paintings is his tendency to work on a single canvas for as long as 30 years. Following his 2003 show, Cate McQuaid wrote in the Boston Globe:

John Lees has paintings of his wife, Ruth, that he has been working on since the '70s. Over 30 years, exploring the image of his wife with a paintbrush and a palette knife, Lees delves deeper and deeper into their relationship. ... Lees lives with his paintings. He builds them up, adds on to their borders, sands them down, then builds some more.

In 2008, Lees became associated with the Betty Cunningham Gallery in New York. He has had exhibitions there in 2008, 2009, and 2011. Following his 2008 exhibition, David Cohen titled his review in the New York Sun "Deliciously Distressed" and emphasized Lees' tendency to rework the same canvas for years:

What is primarily to love and at the same time distrust about Mr. Lees is his self-professed obsessiveness. This takes the form, in the mottled surfaces of his slowly worked landscapes, figure studies, and still life paintings, of accretion, stress, and mutedness. ... Mr. Lees's surfaces are deliciously distressed. His pictures have the battered, timeworn quality of a masterpiece discovered in a thrift store. His portraits — whether of his wife, 'Ruth (Face)' (1979–2005); a familiar cartoon pig in 'Pompeiian Porky' (2003–07), or the jazzman Bix Beiderbecke, in 'Rhythm King' (1984–2008) – have a Trecento primitivism about them.

== Professor of art ==
In addition to his own painting, Lees has served as an art professor for 40 years at the New York Studio School of Drawing, Painting and Sculpture (1988–2011), the School of Visual Arts (1987–2005), Sarah Lawrence College (2000–2003), State University of New York at New Paltz (1996–2000), and Mt. San Antonio College (1971–1981). He has also been a visiting artist at Wayne State University (1978), Vermont Studio Center (1989, 2000–2002), and the International School of Art in Umbria, Montecastello de Vibio, Italy (1997, 2000).

== Awards and museum collections ==
In 2005, Lees received the Francis J. Greenburger Award. He also received the American Academy of Arts and Letters, Hassam, Speicher, Betts and Symonds Art Purchase Award in 2010, the John Simon Guggenheim Memorial Foundation Grant in 1993 and the National Endowment for the Arts Fellowship Grant in 1989.

Lees' paintings are included in the public collections of New York's Museum of Modern Art, the Solomon R. Guggenheim Museum, Harvard University's Fogg Art Museum, New York's New Museum, the Detroit Institute of Arts, the Kemper Museum of Contemporary Art, the Brooklyn Museum, Pittsburgh's Carnegie Museum of Art, the Arkansas Art Center, the Santa Barbara Museum of Art, the Cleveland Museum of Art, Dartmouth College's Hood Museum of Art, Museum of Contemporary Art San Diego, the University of Kansas' Spencer Museum of Art, the University of New Mexico Art Museum, the University Museum of Contemporary Art at the University of Massachusetts Amherst, the Jane Voorhees Zimmerli Art Museum at Rutgers University, the Ackland Art Museum at the University of North Carolina at Chapel Hill, and the Tucson Museum of Art.
