= Cedar Lake (Ontario) =

Cedar Lake may refer to one of eighteen lakes of that name in Ontario, Canada:

- Cedar Lake in Algoma District, National Topographic System (NTS) Map Sheet 41J10 Rawhide Lake
- In Frontenac County:
  - Cedar Lake, NTS Map Sheet 31C8 Gananoque
  - Cedar Lake, NTS Map Sheet 31C10 Tichborne
  - Cedar Lake, NTS Map Sheet 31C10
  - Cedar Lake, NTS Map Sheet 31C14 Bon Echo
  - Cedar Lake, NTS Map Sheet 31F2 Clyde Forks
- Cedar Lake in Haliburton County, NTS Map Sheet 31D15 Minden
- Cedar Lake in Hastings County, NTS Map Sheet 31C13 Coe Hill
- Cedar Lake (Kenora District), NTS Map Sheet 52K3 Cliff Lake
- Cedar Lake in Manitoulin District, NTS Map Sheet 41I3 Lake Panache
- Cedar Lake (Nipissing District), NTS Map Sheet 31L1 Brent
- Cedar Lake in Rainy River District, NTS Map Sheet 52C13 Northwest Bay
- Cedar Lake in Renfrew County, NTS Map Sheet 31F6 Brudenell
- Cedar Lake in Sudbury District, NTS Map Sheet 41P2 Pilgrim Creek
- In Thunder Bay District:
  - Cedar Lake, NTS Map Sheet 42E14 Treptow Lake
  - Cedar Lake, NTS Map Sheet 41N12 Michipicoten Island
  - Cedar Lake, NTS Map Sheet 42C12 Cedar Lake
  - Cedar Lake, NTS Map Sheet 42D15 Coldwell

There is also a lake named Cedar Lakes in Algoma District.
