= Percy Creek (Sudbury District) =

- Location of the mouth of Percy Creek in Ontario

Location
- Country: Canada
- Province: Ontario
- Region: Northeastern Ontario
- District: Sudbury

Physical characteristics
- Source: Unnamed lake
  - location: Moggy Township
  - coordinates: 47°21′31″N 83°47′54″W
  - elevation: 438 m (1,437 ft)
- Mouth: Batchawana River
  - location: Moen Township
  - coordinates: 47°19′50″N 83°51′07″W
  - elevation: 419 m (1,375 ft)

Basin features
- River system: Great Lakes Basin

Percy Creek is a stream in the western part of Sudbury District in Northeastern Ontario, Canada. It is in the Great Lakes Basin and is a right tributary of the Batchawana River.

== Course ==
Percy Creek begins at an unnamed lake in geographic Moggy Township and flows southwest to the northeast side of Percy Lake. It drains the lake at the west and continues in a southwest direction, passes into geographic Moen Township, and reaches its mouth at the Batchawana River. The Batchawana River flows to Lake Superior.

== See also ==
- List of rivers of Ontario
