= Elizabethtown Tract =

Coordinates: 40.49°N 74.27°W

The Elizabethtown Tract was a property that was purchased on October 28, 1664, by John Baily, Daniel Denton and Luke Watson from the Native Americans that is in the area of (and surrounding) present-day Elizabeth, New Jersey. The Native American witnesses to the treaty gave their names as Warinanco and Mattano, who are both the namesakes of modern public parks in the area. As specified in the Deed, the purchase included the area "Bounded on the South by a River commonly called the Raritons River, and on the East by the River which Parts Staten-Island and the Main, and to run Northward up after Cull-Bay, till we come at the first River which sets Westwards up after Cull-Bay." The territory encompassed lands from the mouth of the Raritan River and included all of present-day Union County as well as parts of Somerset, Middlesex, Morris and Essex counties.

Shortly after the purchase, Denton explored the area in and surrounding his purchase. In 1670, Denton wrote the first English-language description of the area.

== See also ==
- History of Elizabeth, New Jersey; including the early history of Union county
- Denville Township - Named after Daniel Denton, one of the purchasers of the Elizabethtown Tract
- Monmouth Tract - Similar triangular tract of land that was also granted to English settlers in 1665
- Province of East Jersey
- Province of New Jersey
- Colonial history of New Jersey
