= Denville Township, New Jersey =

Township in Morris County, New Jersey, US

- Township
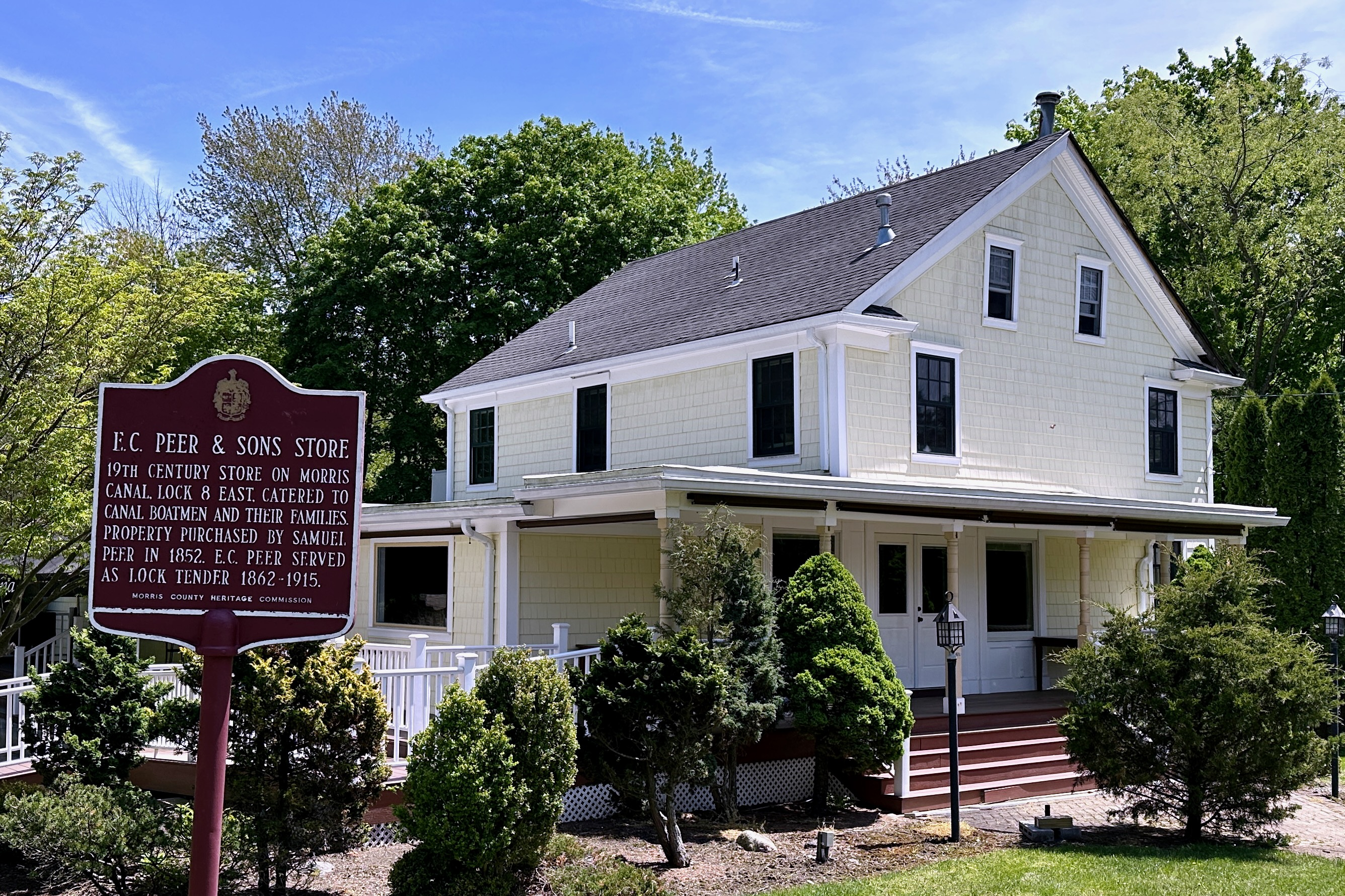
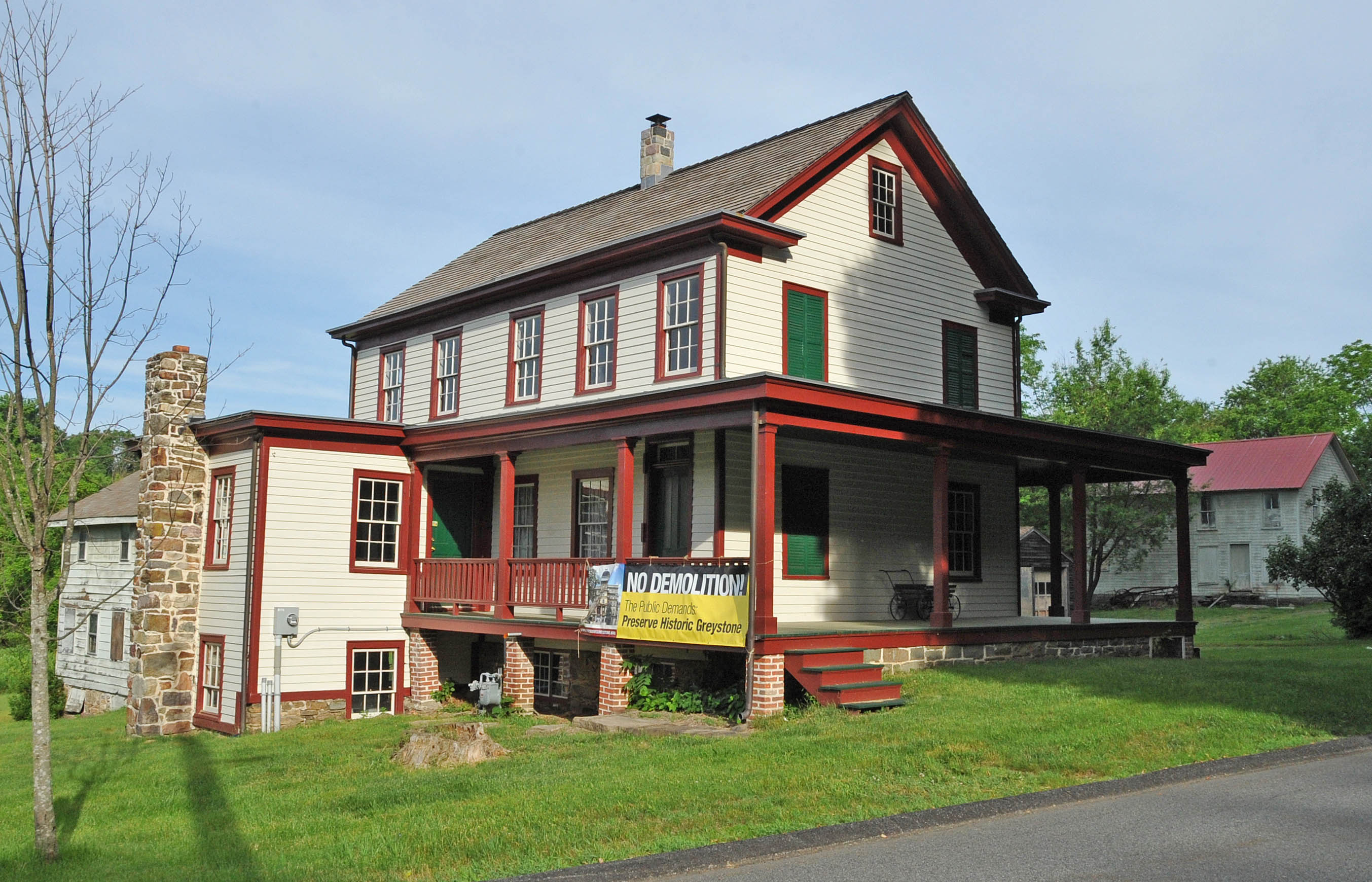
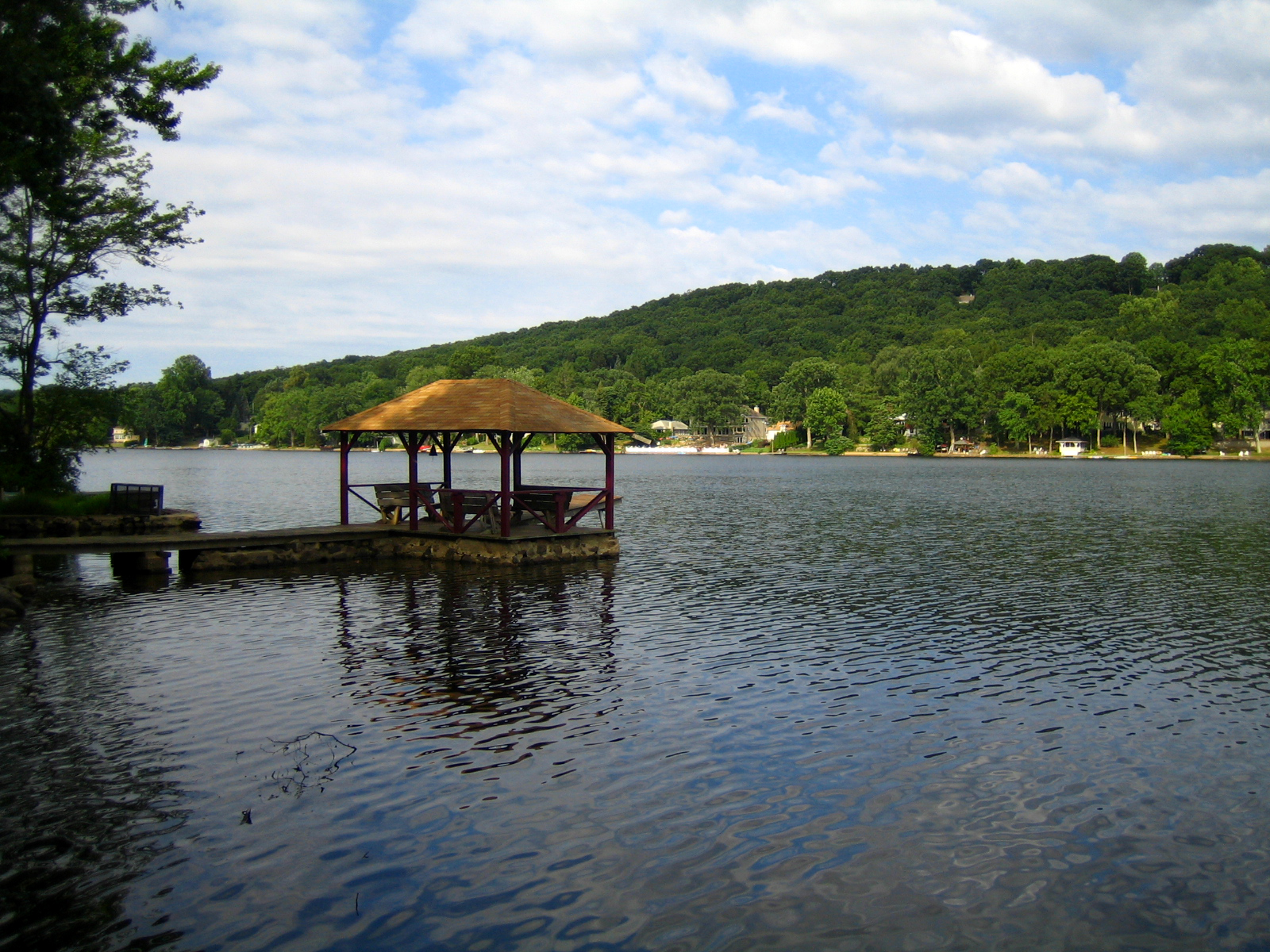
- E.C. Peer & Sons Store Ayres Farmstead Cedar Lake

- Seal
- Nickname: "Hub of Morris County"
- Location of Denville Township in Morris County highlighted in red (right). Inset map: Location of Morris County in New Jersey highlighted in orange (left).

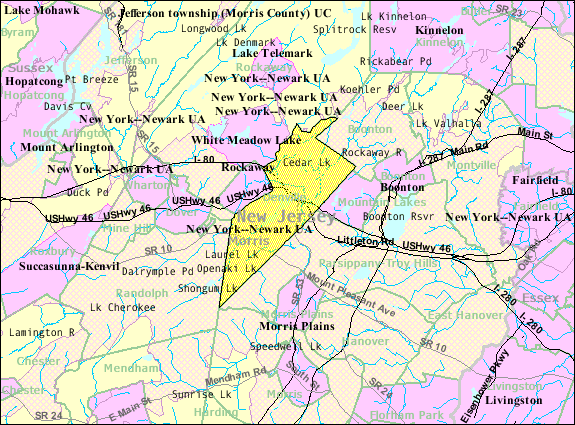
- Census Bureau map of Denville, New Jersey
- Interactive map of Denville Township, New Jersey
- Location in Morris County Location in New Jersey Location in the United States
- Coordinates: 40.888479°N 74.488377°W
- Country: United States
- State: New Jersey
- County: Morris
- Incorporated: April 14, 1913
- Named for: Daniel Denton

Government
  - Type: Faulkner Act (mayor–council)
  - Body: Township Council
  - Mayor: Thomas W. Andes (R, term ends December 31, 2027)
  - Administrator: Steven Ward
  - Municipal clerk: Matthew Bansch

Area
  - Total: 12.74 sq mi (32.99 km^{2})
  - Land: 11.99 sq mi (31.06 km^{2})
  - Water: 0.75 sq mi (1.94 km^{2}) 5.86%
  - Rank: 185th of 565 in state 14th of 39 in county
- Elevation: 505 ft (154 m)

Population (2020)
  - Total: 17,107
  - Estimate (2023): 17,148
  - Rank: 156th of 565 in state 12th of 39 in county
  - Density: 1,426.5/sq mi (550.8/km^{2})
  - Rank: 343rd of 565 in state 20th of 39 in county
- Time zone: UTC−05:00 (Eastern (EST))
  - Summer (DST): UTC−04:00 (Eastern (EDT))
- ZIP Code: 07834
- Area code: 973
- FIPS code: 3402717650
- GNIS feature ID: 0882204
- Website: www.denvillenj.gov

Denville Township is a township in Morris County, in the northern portion of the U.S. state of New Jersey. It is a commuter town of New York City in the New York area, located 35 miles (56 km) west of Manhattan. As of the 2020 United States census, the township's population was 17,107, its highest decennial count ever and an increase of 472 (+2.8%) from the 2010 census count of 16,635, which in turn had reflected an increase of 811 (+5.1%) from the 15,824 counted at the 2000 census.

Located at the center of the county, Denville's access to major transportation routes has made it known as the Hub of Morris County. The township's location in Morris County has contributed to the growth of its "eclectic downtown", along with four membership lake communities developed a century ago as summer colonies.

NJ Transit rail service is available at the Denville station, a large three-platform station serving both the Morristown and the Montclair-Boonton lines, with service to Hoboken Terminal or to New York Penn Station in New York City via Midtown Direct.

Denville was formed as a township by an act of the New Jersey Legislature on April 14, 1913, from portions of Rockaway Township.

== History ==
Lenape Native Americans were known to travel the Minisink Trail for centuries before Europeans arrived in New Jersey. Part of that trail cut across what is now southern Denville, roughly following the course of Route 10 and Mount Pleasant Turnpike. Some research has indicated that there was a Lenape campsite along the trail in Denville, on or near the Ayres / Knuth Farm Historic Site along Route 10.

When Dutch and English settlers began to arrive in the new world in the early 17th century, the Minisink Trail was the likely route they traveled to explore the interior. Daniel Denton, one of the purchasers of what is known as the Elizabethtown Tract in 1664, led an expedition into the interior of northern New Jersey. In 1670, he wrote the first English language description of the area. Some researchers conclude that the name "Denville" derives from Denton.

Some researchers have suggested that European settlers began to come to the Denville area as early as 1690. These early settlers were primarily Dutch and English from Long Island, Quakers from Philadelphia, and Germans. William Penn and several other proprietors began to survey and stake out lands in the Denville area around 1715. These surveys are the first documentation of Denville. Between 1730 and 1760, several forges and mills were erected in Denville along the Rockaway River and the Denbrook. A number of communities associated with the forges and mills began to emerge. Ninkey and Franklin in southern Denville developed around the forges there of the same names. Denville village developed around the Job Allen Iron Works. Early developers of Denville, such as the Hussa family and A.B Crane & Co., were intrinsic in shaping the residential and lake communities.

An alternative explanation for the derivation of the township's name came from a letter from early Denville settler John Hinchman in the year 1800, in which he recounted some of the oral history of Denville from 50 years earlier, as stated to him by some of the elders of the time. Hinchman explains in his letter that the naming of Denville can be traced to a "den" of wild animals located in the swampy regions along the Denbrook and Rockaway River. The animals would bask on a knoll that juts out into the meadows where they were hunted by the native Lenape. This "den", Hinchman wrote, was the basis for the name of Denville and the Denbrook.

== Geography ==
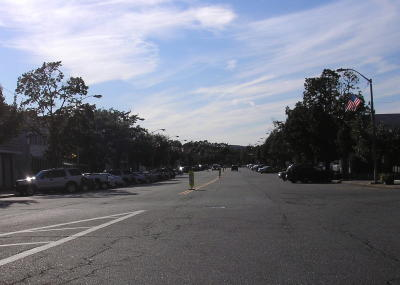
Broadway, Denville's main street

The township had a total area of 12.74 square miles (32.99 km^{2}), including 11.99 square miles (31.06 km^{2}) of land and 0.75 square miles (1.94 km^{2}) of water (5.86%).

Unincorporated communities, localities and place names located partially or completely within the township include Cedar Lake, Cooks Pond, Cooper Lake, Franklin, Indian Lake, Lake Arrowhead, Lake Estling, Lake Openaka, Mount Tabor, Openaka Lake, Rock Ridge, Snake Hill, and Union Hill.

The township borders the Morris County municipalities of Mountain Lakes and Parsippany to the east, Morris Township to the South, Randolph to the south and west, Rockaway to the west, Rockaway Township to the north and west, and Boonton Township to the north and east.

Denville has 11 named bodies of water within township limits. The four major residential lake communities are Cedar Lake, Indian Lake, Rock Ridge and Lake Arrowhead (including Great Bay and Bay of Deep Waters). Estling Lake is a private summer community. The three minor lakes are Cooper Lake, Hollstein Lake, and Openaki Lake. The town also has Cooks Pond, a recreational lake available for public use by membership.

Most residents of Denville live in the non-lake communities in the township, including Bald Hill, Beacon Hill and Union Hill.

As of 2026, the township is a member of Local Leaders for Responsible Planning in order to address the township's Mount Laurel doctrine-based housing obligations.

== Demographics ==
Historical population
Census	Pop.	Note	%±
1920	1,205		—
1930	2,162		79.4%
1940	3,117		44.2%
1950	6,055		94.3%
1960	10,632		75.6%
1970	14,045		32.1%
1980	14,380		2.4%
1990	13,812		−3.9%
2000	15,824		14.6%
2010	16,635		5.1%
2020	17,107		2.8%
2023 (est.)	17,148		0.2%
Population sources: 1920 1920–1930; 1940–2000 2000; 2010 2020

=== 2010 census ===
The 2010 United States census counted 16,635 people, 6,432 households, and 4,509 families in the township. The population density was 1,401.8 per square mile (541.2/km^{2}). There were 6,734 housing units at an average density of 567.4 per square mile (219.1/km^{2}). The racial makeup was 89.49% (14,887) White, 1.42% (236) Black or African American, 0.12% (20) Native American, 6.52% (1,084) Asian, 0.01% (1) Pacific Islander, 0.78% (129) from other races, and 1.67% (278) from two or more races. Hispanic or Latino of any race were 5.31% (883) of the population.

Of the 6,432 households, 32.1% had children under the age of 18; 59.8% were married couples living together; 7.6% had a female householder with no husband present and 29.9% were non-families. Of all households, 25.6% were made up of individuals and 13.1% had someone living alone who was 65 years of age or older. The average household size was 2.57 and the average family size was 3.12.

23.7% of the population were under the age of 18, 5.9% from 18 to 24, 23.0% from 25 to 44, 31.7% from 45 to 64, and 15.7% who were 65 years of age or older. The median age was 43.4 years. For every 100 females, the population had 91.4 males. For every 100 females ages 18 and older there were 87.9 males.

The Census Bureau's 2006–2010 American Community Survey showed that (in 2010 inflation-adjusted dollars) median household income was $103,435 (with a margin of error of +/− $5,379) and the median family income was $122,600 (+/− $7,473). Males had a median income of $85,571 (+/− $9,730) versus $61,382 (+/− $2,135) for females. The per capita income for the borough was $49,990 (+/− $3,235). About none of families and 3.4% of the population were below the poverty line, including 1.8% of those under age 18 and 1.7% of those age 65 or over.

=== 2000 census ===
As of the 2000 United States census there were 15,824 people, 5,990 households, and 4,312 families residing in the township. The population density was 1,307.1 inhabitants per square mile (504.7/km^{2}). (in the 2010 Census there are 16,635 people). There were 6,178 housing units at an average density of 510.3 per square mile (197.0/km^{2}). The racial makeup of the township was 92.64% White, 1.14% African American, 0.08% Native American, 4.64% Asian, (in the 2010 Census it was 1,084 or 6.5%), 0.03% Pacific Islander, 0.44% from other races, and 1.03% from two or more races. Hispanic or Latino people of any race were 2.64% of the population.

There were 5,990 households, out of which 33.0% had children under the age of 18 living with them, 62.8% were married couples living together, 6.4% had a female householder with no husband present, and 28.0% were non-families. 23.6% of all households were made up of individuals, and 11.4% had someone living alone who was 65 years of age or older. The average household size was 2.59 and the average family size was 3.11.

In the township, the population was spread out, with 23.9% under the age of 18, 4.9% from 18 to 24, 30.5% from 25 to 44, 25.7% from 45 to 64, and 15.0% who were 65 years of age or older. The median age was 40 years. For every 100 females, there were 92.8 males. For every 100 females age 18 and over, there were 89.1 males.

The median income for a household in the township was $76,778, and the median income for a family was $90,651. Males had a median income of $63,413 versus $42,392 for females. The per capita income for the township was $38,607. About 1.7% of families and 2.8% of the population were below the poverty line, including 2.4% of those under age 18 and 5.3% of those age 65 or over.

== Economy ==
In 2003, the Shoppes at Union Hill, a 92,000-square-foot (8,500 m^{2}) outdoor lifestyle center, opened along Route 10.

== Sports ==
The game of American flag rugby was first played in Denville, introduced to the township by resident Tom Feury.

== Parks and recreation ==
The Tourne county park is in portions of Denville, Boonton Township and Mountain Lakes. The park covers more than 540 acres (220 ha) of undeveloped land and offers a view of the New York City skyline from its peak standing 897 feet (273 m) high.

== Government ==
=== Local government ===
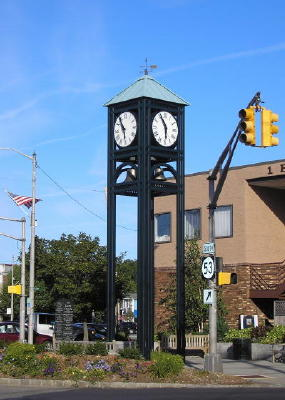
Denville's town clock with sign for Route 53 visible

Denville Township is governed within the Faulkner Act, formally known as the Optional Municipal Charter Law, under Mayor-Council plan F, as implemented as of January 1, 1972, based on the recommendations of a Charter Study Commission. The township is one of 71 municipalities (of the 564) statewide governed under this form. The governing body is comprised of the mayor and the seven-member township council, all elected to four-year terms of office on a partisan basis in odd-numbered years as part of the November general election. Four members are elected together, one council member from each of four wards, and two years later, the three at-large and the mayoral seats are up for election at the same time.

As of 2024, the mayor of Denville Township is Republican Thomas W. Andes, whose term of office ends December 31, 2027. Members of the Denville Township Council are Gary Borowiec (2025; Ward 4), Glenn R. Buie (R, 2025; Ward 3), Angela Coté (R, 2027; at-large), Christopher Golinski (R, 2025; Ward 2), Chrissy Kovacs (R, 2025; Ward 1), Louis R. Maffei (R, 2027; at-large) and Robbie Simpson (R, 2027; at-large).

In February 2020, the township council selected former councilmember Christopher Golinski to fill the Second Ward seat expiring in December 2021 that had been held by Brian Bergen until he resigned from office in November 2019 after being elected to a seat in the General Assembly. Golinski served on an interim basis until the November 2020 general election, when he was elected to serve the balance of the term of office.

=== Federal, state and county representation ===
Denville is located in the 11th Congressional District and is part of New Jersey's 26th state legislative district.

For the 119th United States Congress, New Jersey's 11th congressional district is represented by Analilia Mejia (D, Glen Ridge) who was elected in a 2026 special election to serve for the remainder of the Congress following the resignation Mikie Sherrill (D, Montclair), who was elected Governor of New Jersey in 2025. New Jersey is represented in the United States Senate by Democrats Cory Booker (Newark, term ends 2027) and Andy Kim (Moorestown, term ends 2031).

For the 2026–2027 session, the 26th legislative district of the New Jersey Legislature is represented in the State Senate by Joseph Pennacchio (R, Rockaway Township) and in the General Assembly by Brian Bergen (R, Denville Township) and Jay Webber (R, Morris Plains).

Morris County is governed by a Board of County Commissioners comprised of seven members who are elected at-large in partisan elections to three-year terms on a staggered basis, with either one or three seats up for election each year as part of the November general election. Actual day-to-day operation of departments is supervised by County Administrator Deena Leary.

As of 2026, Morris County's Commissioners (with all terms ending December 31) are Director Stephen H. Shaw (R, Mountain Lakes, 2027), Deputy Director John Krickus (R, Washington Township, 2027), Douglas Cabana (R, Boonton Township, 2028), Thomas J. Mastrangelo (R, Montville, 2028), Christine Myers (R, Harding Township, 2028), Tayfun Selen (R, Chatham Township, 2026), and Deborah Smith (R, Denville Township, 2027).

The county's constitutional officers are County Clerk Ann F. Grossi (R, Parsippany–Troy Hills, 2028), Sheriff James M. Gannon (R, Boonton Township, 2028) and Surrogate Heather Darling (R, Roxbury, 2029).

=== Politics ===
United States presidential election results for Denville Township 2024 2020 2016 2012 2008 2004
Year	Republican		Democratic		Third party(ies)	
Year	No.	%	No.	%	No.	%
2024	5,365	50.11%	5,157	48.16%	185	1.73%
2020	5,476	48.29%	5,671	50.01%	193	1.70%
2016	4,980	51.95%	4,234	44.16%	373	3.89%
2012	4,898	55.54%	3,805	43.15%	116	1.32%
2008	5,266	54.77%	4,230	44.00%	118	1.23%
2004	5,214	58.66%	3,606	40.57%	68	0.77%

As of March 2011, there were a total of 11,789 registered voters in Denville Township, of which 2,288 (19.4%) were registered as Democrats, 4,951 (42.0%) were registered as Republicans and 4,542 (38.5%) were registered as Unaffiliated. There were 8 voters registered as Libertarians or Greens.

In the 2012 presidential election, Republican Mitt Romney received 55.5% of the vote (4,898 cast), ahead of Democrat Barack Obama with 43.1% (3,805 votes), and other candidates with 1.3% (116 votes), among the 8,863 ballots cast by the township's 12,128 registered voters (44 ballots were spoiled), for a turnout of 73.1%. In the 2008 presidential election, Republican John McCain received 54.5% of the vote (5,266 cast), ahead of Democrat Barack Obama with 43.7% (4,230 votes) and other candidates with 1.2% (118 votes), among the 9,670 ballots cast by the township's 12,226 registered voters, for a turnout of 79.1%. In the 2004 presidential election, Republican George W. Bush received 58.5% of the vote (5,214 ballots cast), outpolling Democrat John Kerry with 40.5% (3,606 votes) and other candidates with 0.6% (68 votes), among the 8,914 ballots cast by the township's 11,605 registered voters, for a turnout percentage of 76.8.

Gubernatorial election results for Denville Township
Year	Republican		Democratic		Third party(ies)	
Year	No.	%	No.	%	No.	%
2025	3,932	47.41%	4,333	52.25%	28	0.34%
2021	4,106	55.59%	3,223	43.64%	57	0.77%
2017	3,164	55.00%	2,460	42.76%	129	2.24%
2013	3,758	69.86%	1,489	27.68%	132	2.45%
2009	4,092	62.85%	1,834	28.17%	585	8.98%
2005	3,147	57.83%	2,146	39.43%	149	2.74%

In the 2013 gubernatorial election, Republican Chris Christie received 69.9% of the vote (3,758 cast), ahead of Democrat Barbara Buono with 27.7% (1,489 votes), and other candidates with 2.5% (132 votes), among the 5,462 ballots cast by the township's 12,145 registered voters (83 ballots were spoiled), for a turnout of 45.0%. In the 2009 gubernatorial election, Republican Chris Christie received 61.3% of the vote (4,092 ballots cast), ahead of Democrat Jon Corzine with 29.0% (1,934 votes), Independent Chris Daggett with 8.3% (554 votes) and other candidates with 0.5% (31 votes), among the 6,673 ballots cast by the township's 12,070 registered voters, yielding a 55.3% turnout.

United States Senate election results for Denville Township1
Year	Republican		Democratic		Third party(ies)	
Year	No.	%	No.	%	No.	%
2024	5,104	50.23%	4,872	47.94%	186	1.83%
2018	4,399	52.94%	3,457	41.60%	454	5.46%
2012	4,568	62.99%	2,559	35.29%	125	1.72%
2006	3,389	58.64%	2,284	39.52%	106	1.83%

United States Senate election results for Denville Township2
Year	Republican		Democratic		Third party(ies)	
Year	No.	%	No.	%	No.	%
2020	5,560	49.98%	5,430	48.81%	134	1.20%
2014	2,578	56.70%	1,882	41.39%	87	1.91%
2013	2,213	58.59%	1,545	40.91%	19	0.50%
2008	4,968	56.96%	3,609	41.38%	145	1.66%

== Local Media ==
Denville Now is a Denville, NJ news source. Covering community events, local government, education, business, and more.

== Chamber of Commerce ==
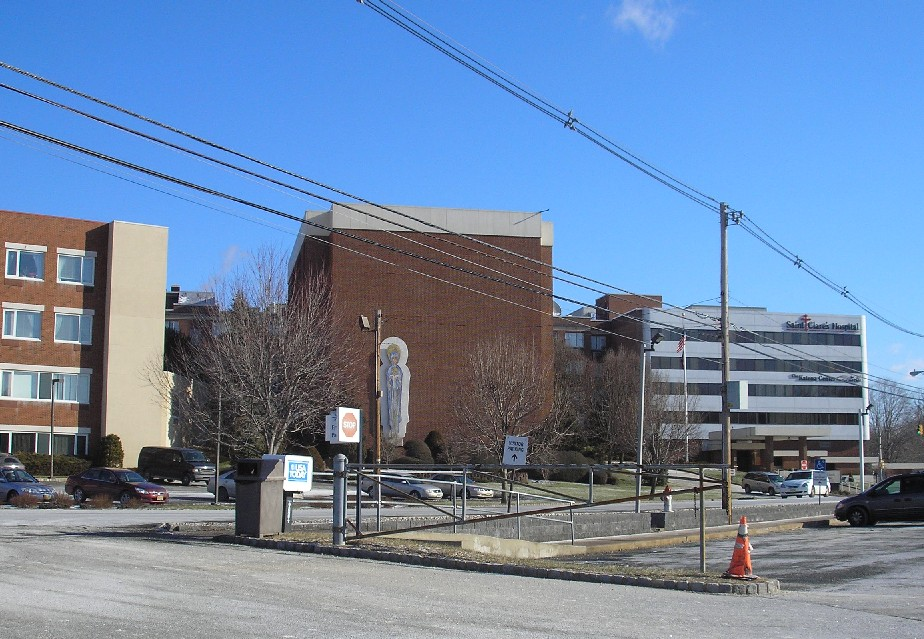
Saint Clare's Hospital, Denville's largest employer

The chamber is focused on making the community and business districts a better place for businesses, residents and visitors. Each year a pair of teenagers are crowned as Mr. and Miss Denville. They are participants in a winter holiday parade and weekend-long celebration. They are chosen for their volunteer work in Denville, and overall hard work.

== Education ==
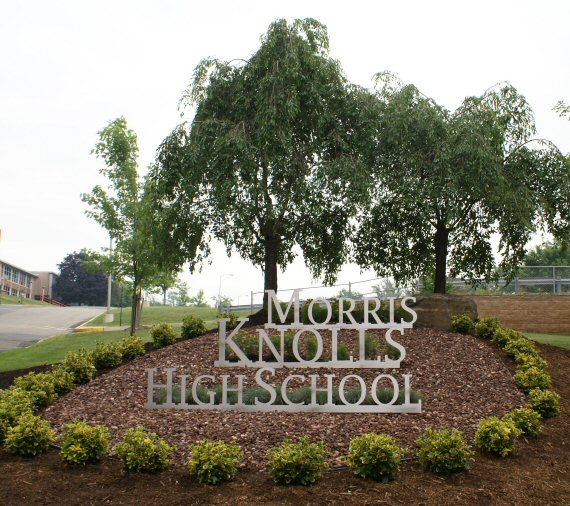
Morris Knolls High School

The Denville Township School District serve public school students in pre-kindergarten through eighth grade. As of the 2023–24 school year, the district, comprised of three schools, had an enrollment of 1,700 students and 167.8 classroom teachers (on an FTE basis), for a student–teacher ratio of 10.1:1. Schools in the district (with 2022–23 enrollment data from the National Center for Education Statistics) are Lakeview Elementary School with 691 students in grades PreK–5, Riverview Elementary School with 460 students in grades K–5 and Valleyview Middle School with 539 students in grades 6–8. Riverview Elementary School was one of nine schools in New Jersey honored in 2020 by the National Blue Ribbon Schools Program, which recognizes high student achievement.

Students in public school for ninth through twelfth grades typically attend Morris Knolls High School, which is located in Denville, but has a Rockaway address, along with most students from Rockaway Township. The high school is part of the Morris Hills Regional High School District, which also serves the residential communities of Rockaway Borough and Wharton. As of the 2023–24 school year, the high school had an enrollment of 1,473 students and 137.5 classroom teachers (on an FTE basis), for a student–teacher ratio of 10.7:1.

Morris Catholic High School is a four-year comprehensive Roman Catholic regional high school that was founded in 1957, which is operated as part of the Diocese of Paterson.

Assumption College for Sisters is a two-year Roman Catholic women's college. Founded in 1953 through an affiliation with Seton Hall University, Assumption is run by the Sisters of Christian Charity. Primarily designed to prepare women for work in religious vocations, Assumption specializes in theological studies and the liberal arts. It is the last remaining sisters' college, or college primarily designed to educate nuns, in the United States. In 2014, the school relocated to a convent on the campus of Morris Catholic High School.

== Transportation ==
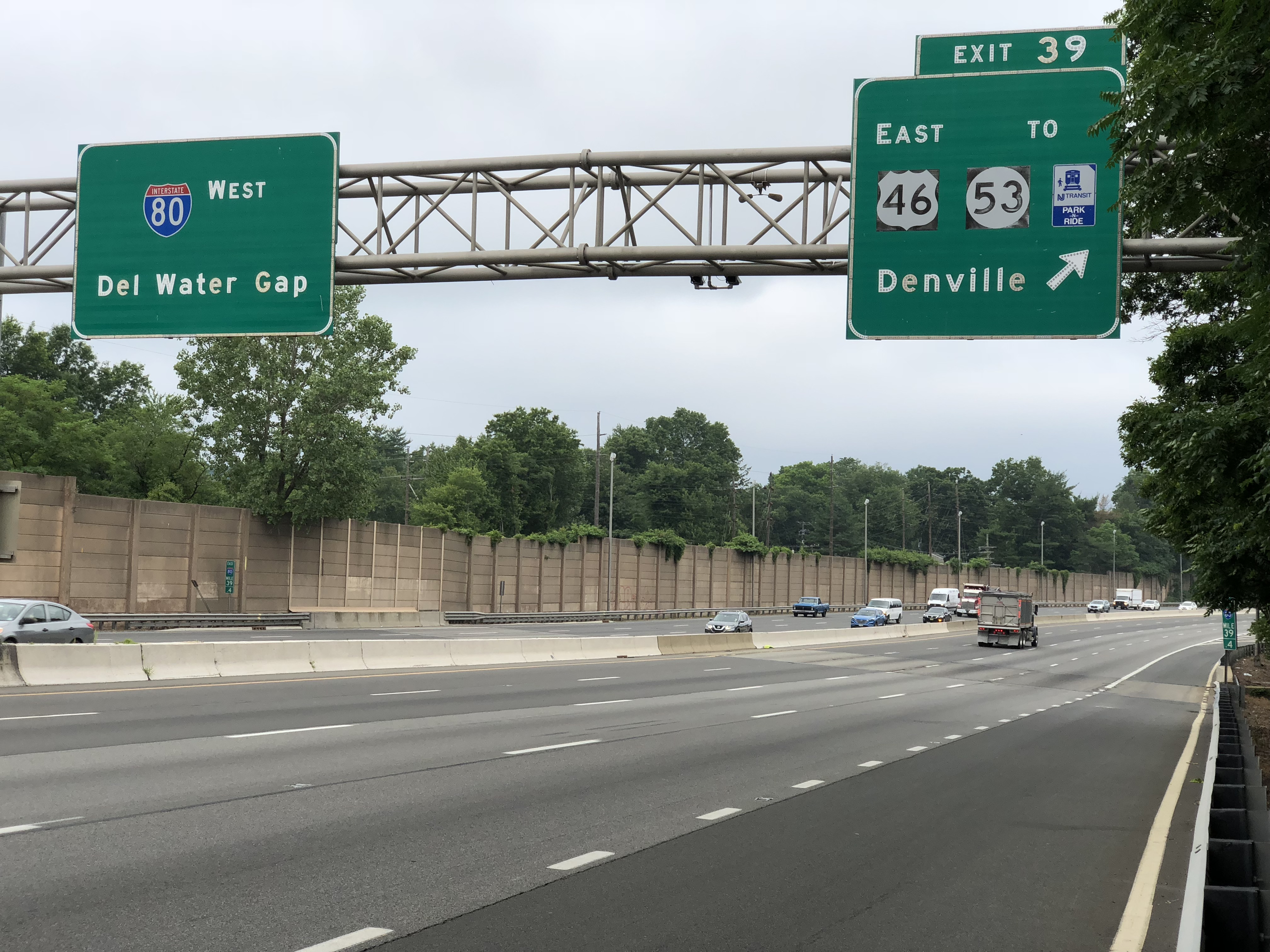
Interstate 80 westbound at the exit for U.S. Route 46 and Route 53 in Denville.

=== Roads and highways ===
As of May 2010, the township had a total of 94.01 miles (151.29 km) of roadways, of which 83.83 miles (134.91 km) were maintained by the municipality, 2.60 miles (4.18 km) by Morris County and 7.58 miles (12.20 km) by the New Jersey Department of Transportation.

Route 10, Route 53, US 46 and I-80 pass through the township.

=== Public transportation ===
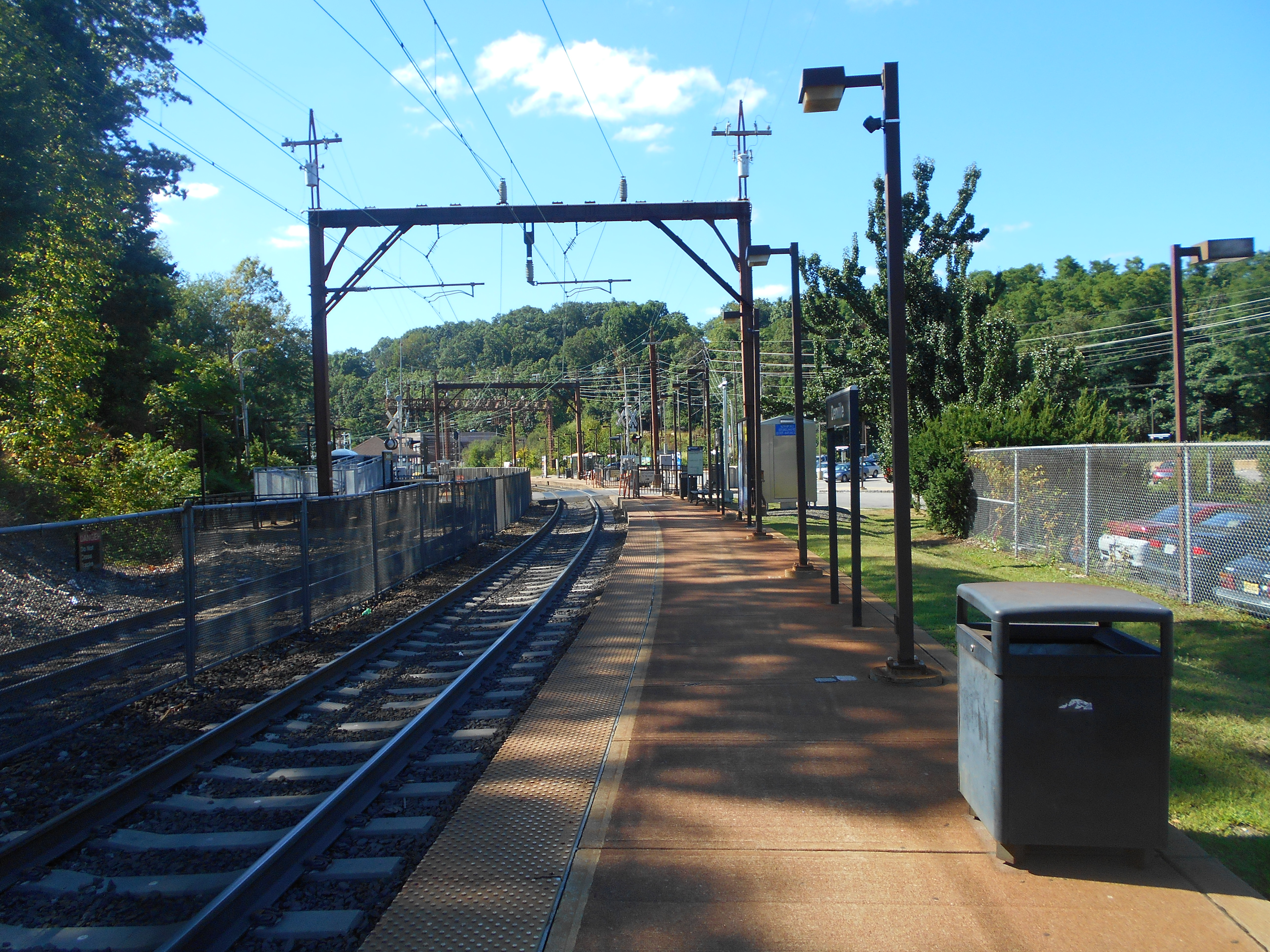
Denville station services both of the New Jersey Transit's lines of Morristown and Montclair-Boonton.

The Denville station offers train service to Hoboken Terminal or to New York Penn Station in Midtown Manhattan via Midtown Direct on NJ Transit's Morristown Line and Montclair-Boonton Line. Denville is actually two stations located within the same property. The Morristown Line station is two platforms located on a curve while the Montclair-Boonton Line station is a single platform next to the closed Denville Tower.

NJ Transit offers local bus service on the 875 and 880 routes, which replaced service that had been offered on the MCM2 and MCM10 routes until June 2010, when NJ Transit pulled the subsidy.

Denville is served by Lakeland Bus Lines with frequent service to the Port Authority Bus Terminal in Midtown Manhattan.

Newark Airport, is located 27.5 miles (44.3 km) southeast of Denville in Newark. Other nearby airports include LaGuardia Airport (43 miles from Denville) and John F. Kennedy International Airport (54 miles from Denville), both of which are in Queens, New York City.

== Popular culture ==
- The farm scene from the film version of Torch Song Trilogy was filmed at the Knuth Farm.
- Saint Clare's Hospital was where Tony and Christopher were taken after their accident in episode 83 of The Sopranos, "Kennedy and Heidi".
- Married to Jonas, starring Kevin Jonas and wife Danielle, was filmed at their house in the township.

== Community ==
- Our Hometown: Celebrating Denville's Centennial, a feature-length documentary about the history of the township, was released in June 2013, in conjunction with Denville's centennial celebration. It features audio interviews with local historians, business leaders, and politicians.

== Climate ==
The lowest recorded temperature in Denville is −20 °F (−32 °C), and the highest recorded temperature is 102 °F (39 °C).

Climate data for Denville Township, New Jersey
Month	Jan	Feb	Mar	Apr	May	Jun	Jul	Aug	Sep	Oct	Nov	Dec	Year
Record high °F (°C)	71 (22)	74 (23)	85 (29)	93 (34)	98 (37)	99 (37)	100 (38)	100 (38)	102 (39)	87 (31)	82 (28)	74 (23)	102 (39)
Mean daily maximum °F (°C)	38 (3)	41 (5)	50 (10)	61 (16)	71 (22)	80 (27)	85 (29)	83 (28)	75 (24)	65 (18)	54 (12)	43 (6)	62 (17)
Mean daily minimum °F (°C)	18 (−8)	19 (−7)	27 (−3)	36 (2)	46 (8)	54 (12)	59 (15)	58 (14)	51 (11)	39 (4)	32 (0)	23 (−5)	39 (4)
Record low °F (°C)	−16 (−27)	−10 (−23)	−4 (−20)	12 (−11)	27 (−3)	32 (0)	40 (4)	36 (2)	27 (−3)	18 (−8)	5 (−15)	−7 (−22)	−16 (−27)
Average precipitation inches (mm)	4.50 (114)	3.12 (79)	4.41 (112)	4.64 (118)	5.09 (129)	4.40 (112)	5.29 (134)	4.37 (111)	5.33 (135)	4.17 (106)	4.37 (111)	4.10 (104)	53.79 (1,365)

== Notable people ==
People who were born in, residents of, or otherwise closely associated with Denville include:

- Pete Abrams (born 1970), cartoonist; writer and illustrator of Sluggy Freelance
- Marthina Aguirre (born 2001), footballer who plays as a midfielder for college team South Alabama Jaguars and the Ecuador women's national team
- Frank Stephen Baldwin (1838–1925), calculating machine designer
- Trevor Baptiste (born 1996), professional lacrosse midfielder for the Boston Cannons
- Brian Bergen (born 1979), politician who represents the 25th Legislative District in the New Jersey General Assembly
- Bill Bradley (born 1943), former pro basketball player and U.S. Senator
- Johnny Cardoso (born 2001), soccer midfielder who plays for Atlético Madrid
- Neal Casal (1968–2019), guitarist, singer, songwriter and photographer; has performed with the Chris Robinson Brotherhood and Hard Working Americans
- Todd Coolman (born 1954), jazz bassist and music professor
- Jerome Corsi (born 1946), author and conspiracy theorist
- Jermaine Eluemunor (born 1994), offensive tackle for the Baltimore Ravens
- Tess Feury (born 1996), rugby union player who competed for the United States at the 2017 and 2021 Rugby World Cups
- Russ Flanagan (1974–2008), journalist
- Lexie Fyfe (born 1969 as MaryBeth Bentley), professional wrestler
- Janice Huff (born 1960), meteorologist on WNBC Channel 4 in New York City
- Tim Jacobus (born 1959), artist best known for illustrating the covers for nearly one hundred books in R. L. Stine's Goosebumps series
- Danielle Jonas (born 1986), reality television personality, social media influencer and hairdresser, known for starring on the E! Entertainment network's reality show Married to Jonas, alongside her husband Kevin Jonas
- Kevin Jonas (born 1987), actor/musician of the Jonas Brothers; appears on E!'s Married to Jonas with his wife, Danielle Deleasa
- Robert Lazzarini (born 1965), artist
- John Lees (born 1943), contemporary expressionist artist and art professor
- Shea Morenz (born 1974), former football and baseball player; current CEO of Stratfor Global Intelligence
- Vickie Paynter (born 1971), former professional tennis player
- Lisa Rieffel (born 1975), actress, best known for her role as Emily Weston on Empty Nest
- Babe Ruth (1895–1948), baseball player, vacationed in the summer at a house on Cedar Lake
- Morton Salkind (1932–2014), politician; Mayor of Marlboro Township, 1969–1975; served in the New Jersey General Assembly, 1974–1976
- Marvin R. Sambur (born 1946), former Assistant Secretary of the Air Force (Acquisition)
- Laura San Giacomo (born 1962), actress who played the role of Maya Gallo on the TV sitcom Just Shoot Me!
- Ketch Secor (born 1978), front man of the Old Crow Medicine Show and co-author (with Bob Dylan) of the song "Wagon Wheel"
- Tom Verlaine (1949-2023), singer, songwriter and guitarist, best known as the frontman of the rock band Television
- Kevin Walker (born 1965), linebacker who played in the NFL for the Cincinnati Bengals
