= Daniel Denton =

Daniel Denton (c. 1626 – 1703) was an early American colonist. Denton led an expedition into the interior of northern New Jersey. He was one of the purchasers of what is known as the Elizabethtown Tract in 1664, in the area of (and surrounding) present day Elizabeth, New Jersey. In 1670 he wrote the first English-language description of the area.

== Biography ==
Denton was born around 1626 in Yorkshire, England. He was the son of the Reverend Richard Denton, one of America's earliest Presbyterian ministers. Many Denton family genealogies claim Daniel's mother was Helen Windebank. In the 1640s he accompanied his father to Massachusetts, Connecticut, and eventually Long Island. In 1650 he was made town clerk of Hempstead, where his father was a pastor, and in 1656 he held the same position in the town of Jamaica. When his father relocated to Halifax, Nova Scotia (or Halifax, Yorks, England), Denton remained on Long Island, and in 1664 he became one of the grantees of a patent at Elizabethtown, New Jersey. In 1665 and 1666 he served as justice of the peace in New York. Around 1659, Denton married Abigail Stevenson, who bore three children, and from whom he was divorced in 1672. The two elder children, Daniel and Abigail, remained with their father, while the infant daughter, Mercy, accompanied her mother, who subsequently remarried. Denton left New York for England in 1670 (which may have occasioned his divorce), and there he evidently participated in settlement enterprises and possibly in the newly acquired (by the English) fur trade.

Denton Green, in Hempstead, NY is named for Reverend Richard Denton, Daniel Denton's father.

== Writing History ==
Denton wrote and published A Brief Description of New-York: Formerly Called New-Netherlands in London in 1670. The work was a promotional tract designed to encourage English settlement of territories recently seized from the Dutch. It is one of the earliest English accounts of the geography, climate, economy, and native inhabitants of the region that includes present-day New York City, Long Island, Staten Island, and New Jersey. The tract is perhaps most famous for its early statement of Manifest Destiny: how "a Divine Hand makes way for them [the English settlers] by removing or cutting off the Indians, either by Wars one with the other, or by some raging mortal Disease." Denton had emigrated to America in the 1640s and was involved in land speculation in the region. The linked article (below) gives a brief account of his life and career, and discusses his vision for the westward expansion of English culture and his representation of the American wilderness as an agrarian frontier.

Though other explanations have been offered, some researchers would later conclude that it was Denton who lent his name to the naming of Denville, New Jersey.

== See also ==
- Province of New Jersey
- Colonial history of New Jersey
