= Harmony River =

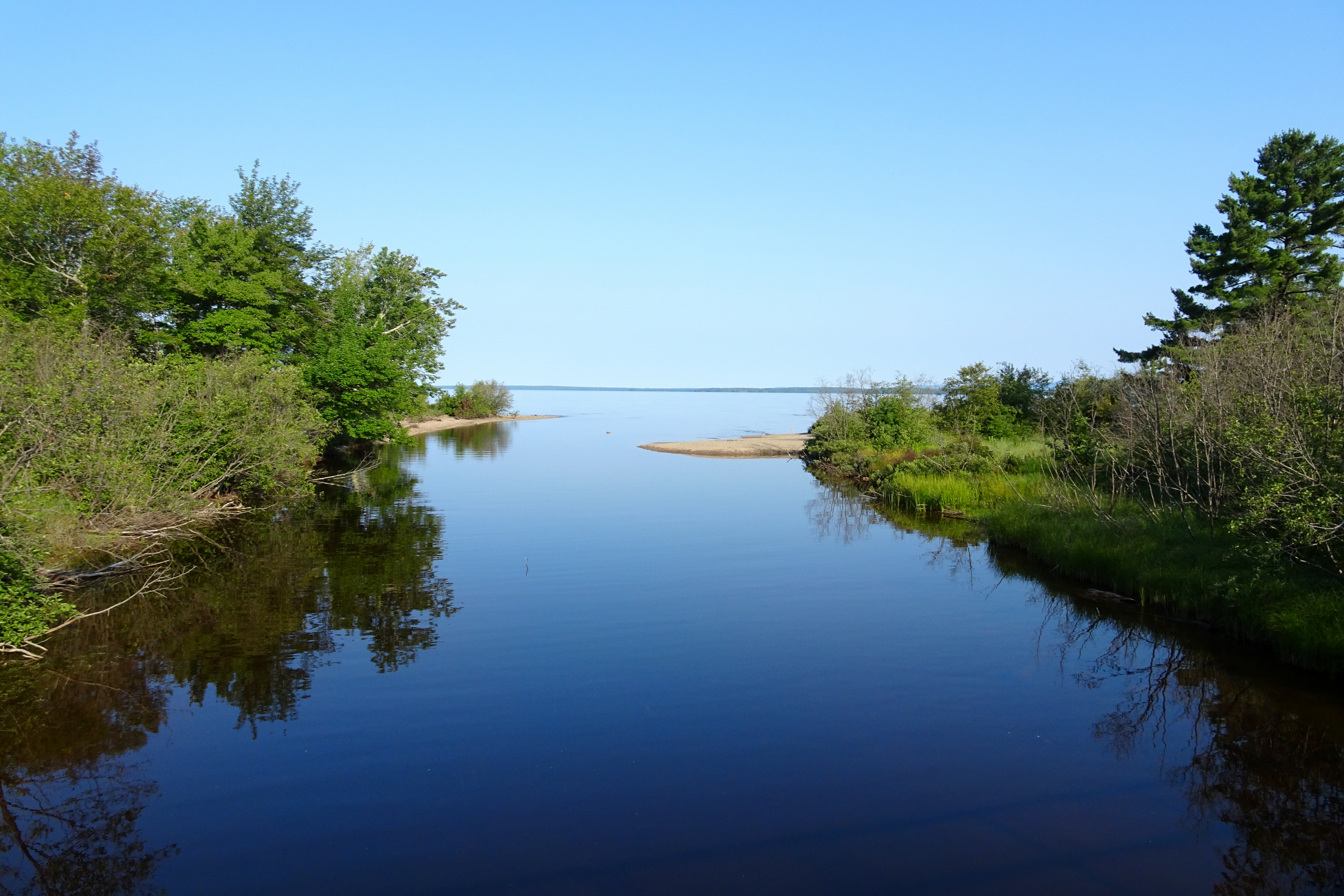

- Location of the mouth of the Harmony River in Ontario

Location
- Country: Canada
- Province: Ontario
- Region: Northeastern Ontario
- District: Algoma District

Physical characteristics
- Source
  - coordinates: 46°55′36″N 84°18′20″W
  - elevation: 456 m (1,496 ft)
- Mouth: Harmony Bay, Lake Superior
  - coordinates: 46°50′42″N 84°22′22″W
  - elevation: 180 m (590 ft)

The Harmony River is a river in Algoma District in northeastern Ontario, Canada that empties into Harmony Bay, part of the larger Batchawana Bay, on Lake Superior at the community of Harmony Beach. The river is known for its rainbow smelt run in the spring and white water kayaking in the early spring and late fall.

== See also ==
- List of rivers of Ontario
