= Batchawana River =

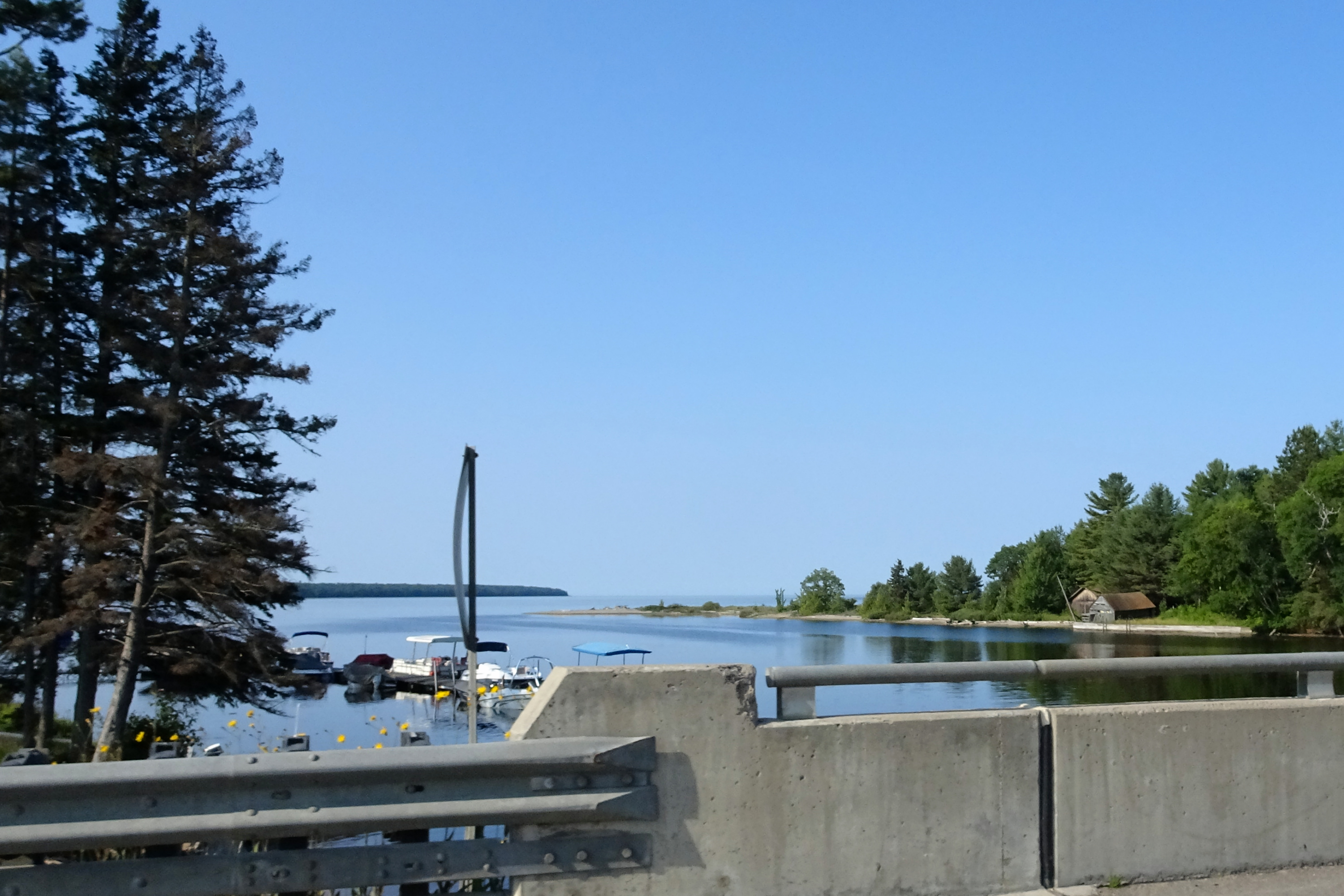
- Mouth of the Batchawana River at Batchawana Bay

- Location of the mouth of the Batchawana River in Ontario
- Etymology: From the Ojibwe meaning "swift waters/current"

Location
- Country: Canada
- Province: Ontario
- Region: Northeastern Ontario
- Districts: Algoma; Sudbury

Physical characteristics
- Source: Unnamed lake
  - location: Sudbury District
  - coordinates: 47°14′36″N 83°39′43″W
  - elevation: 487 m (1,598 ft)
- Mouth: Batchawana Bay, Lake Superior
  - location: Algoma District
  - coordinates: 46°55′49″N 84°31′42″W
  - elevation: 180 m (590 ft)
- Length: 95 km (59 mi)

Basin features
- River system: Great Lakes Basin

The Batchawana River is a river in Algoma and Sudbury Districts of Ontario, Canada, which empties into Batchawana Bay on Lake Superior north of Sault Ste. Marie, Ontario.

The name "Batchawana" is derived from the Ojibwe word obatchiwanang, meaning "current at the strait" or "narrows and swift water there", and refers to the turbulent or bubbling waters flowing between Batchawana Island and Sand Point (directly east of the Batchawana River's mouth).

A trading post was established near the mouth of the river for fur trading around 1817 or 1819 by clerks of the North West Company. The Hudson's Bay Company appears to have operated a post there as well circa 1868-1869.

Batchawana River Provincial Park encompasses portions of the river, and Batchawana Bay Provincial Park, with a large sandy beach, is located just west of the river's mouth on Batchawana Bay. The Algoma Central Railway crosses the river at the settlement of Batchewana.

North of Batchawana Bay is Pancake Bay, so named because fur traders travelling east from Fort William had only enough flour left to make pancakes.

== Tributaries ==
- Kerwin Creek (left)
- Norberg Creek (left)
- Griffin Creek (left)
- Little Batchawana River (right)
- Mongoose Creek (left)
- St. Clair Creek (left)
- Alder Creek (right)
- Quinn River (left)
- Emerson Creek (left)
- Percy Creek (right)
- Toll Creek (right)

== Batchawana River Provincial Park ==
Batchawana River Provincial Park
- IUCN category II (national park)
- Coordinates: 47°08′02″N 84°24′54″W
- Area: 2,684 ha (10.36 sq mi)
- Designation: Waterway
- Established: 2004
- Governing body: Ontario Parks

The Batchawana River Provincial Park protects certain sections of the river and its banks, as well as some adjacent forests. It was established in 2004 and is meant for canoeing and fishing. Features in the park include wide meanders, numerous rapids, islands, shifting stream channels and a 13 kilometres (8.1 mi) long canyon. The forests include yellow birch, white pine and eastern hemlock, that at the northern end of its range.

It is a non-operating park, meaning that there are no facilities or services.

== See also ==
- List of Ontario rivers
