= Cedar Lake (Morris County, New Jersey) =

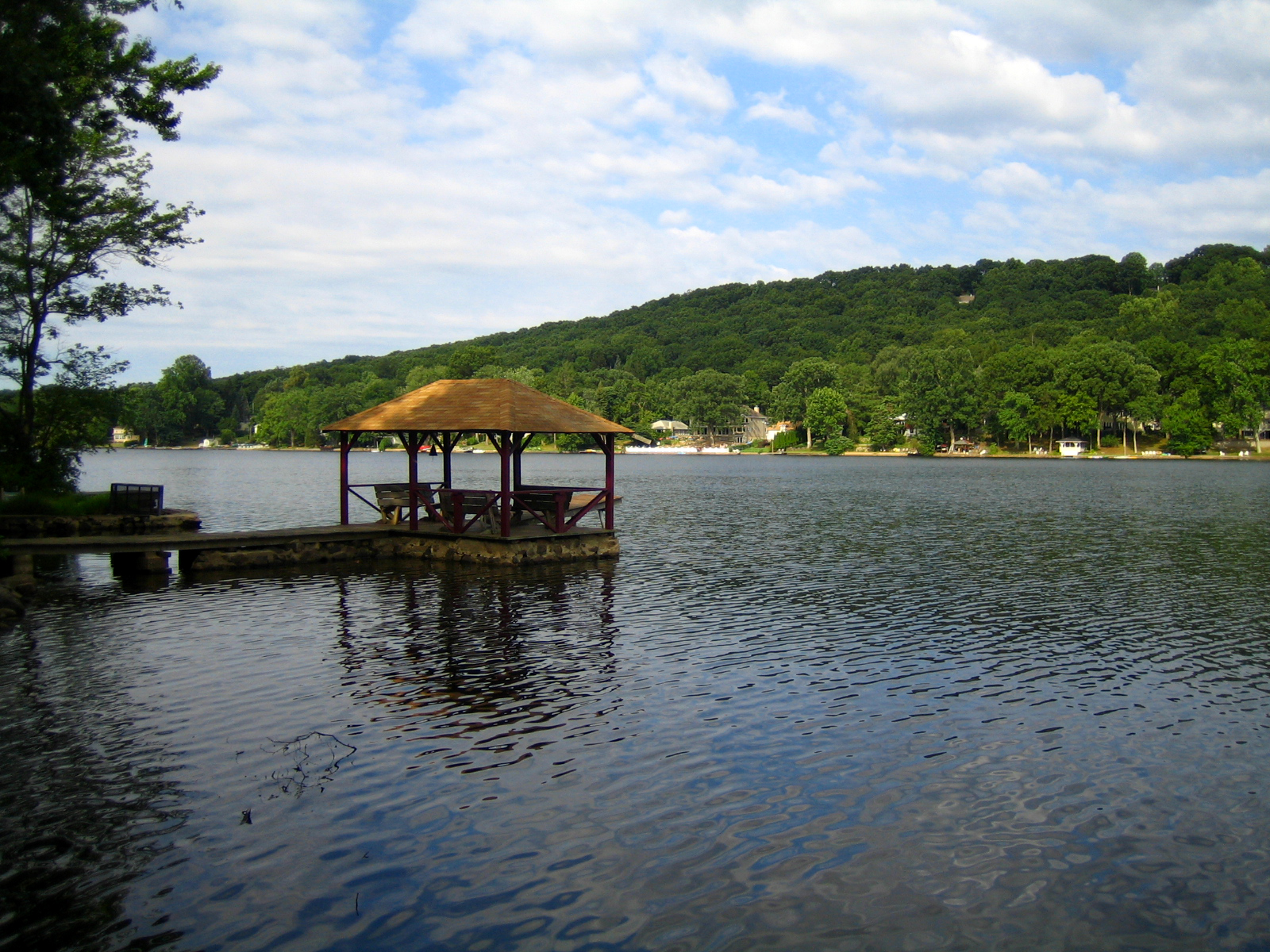
- A gazebo on Cedar Lake

- Location in Morris County Location in New Jersey Location in the United States
- Location: New Jersey
- Coordinates: 40°54′40″N 74°28′23″W
- Type: Reservoir
- Surface elevation: 520 ft (160 m)

Cedar Lake is a 99-acre (40 ha), residential lake, private community and unincorporated community located within Denville Township, Morris County, in the U.S. state of New Jersey. The community's governing body, the Cedar Lake Property Owners, has been maintaining its 320 acres (1.3 km^{2}) of land since June 2, 1925.

== History ==
Cedar Lake was originally a small, natural, spring-fed body of water. In its early days, the lake was used as an ice factory, where the frozen water was harvested and sold during the winters. The lake was dammed and its size was increased to improve the ice harvesting. In 1906, when it was still called Cranberry Lake or Silver Lake, it was purchased by M. W. Raynes and George B. Wright under their company Cedar Lake Park, Inc. The developers marketed their property as a summer resort and built cabins, lodges, and camps for its new residents. Many wealthy New Yorkers vacationed at the lake during weekends, including prominent figures such as Babe Ruth, who stayed in a house on the West Side of the lake. Cedar Lake Park, Inc. went bankrupt in 1924, and the Cedar Lake Property Owners (CLPO) was incorporated and eventually took over ownership of the lake, roads and certain lots from the prior owner. As transportation improved and major highways were built through Denville, houses were built on most of the lots surrounding the lake. Today, over 300 families live in the Cedar Lake Community.

== Recreation ==
The lake is used for many recreational activities, including: swimming, fishing, ice skating, and non-motor boating. The lake has two sand beaches and a floating dock, and which are used by most members of the lake, especially throughout the summer months. The Cedar Lake Community Club (CLCC) runs a clubhouse available to all members of the lake, which provides a tennis court, basketball court, and a playground, organizes many community activities, and hosts a bar for the adults every Friday night.

Cedar Lake is a member of a local athletic organization called Hub Lakes, which includes other local communities: Lake Valhalla, Lake Arrowhead, Estling Lake, Indian Lake, Lake Intervale, Mountain Lakes, Lake Parsippany, Rainbow Lake, Rock Ridge, Lake Telemark, and White Meadow Lake. Hub Lakes provides competition between the lakes in bowling, diving, golf, horseshoes, roller hockey, softball, swimming, table tennis, tennis, track & field, and volleyball.
