= Cedar Lake (Maine) =

- Location within Maine Location within the United States
- Location: Penobscot, Maine
- Coordinates: 45.528°N 68.801°W
- Type: lake

Cedar Lake is a lake in Penobscot, Maine. It is one of many lakes in the region. While it is not as large as some of the other popular lakes, it is one of the few whose water levels are not controlled by the local hydropower company. As it is a smaller lake, it is much easier to navigate by boat than some of the larger lakes, without fear of hitting large rocks. White perch is the main fish source for this lake. About half of the lake is developed and is accessed year-round by a gravel road.

== See also ==
- List of lakes in Maine
