= Batchawana Bay, Ontario =

Batchawana Bay
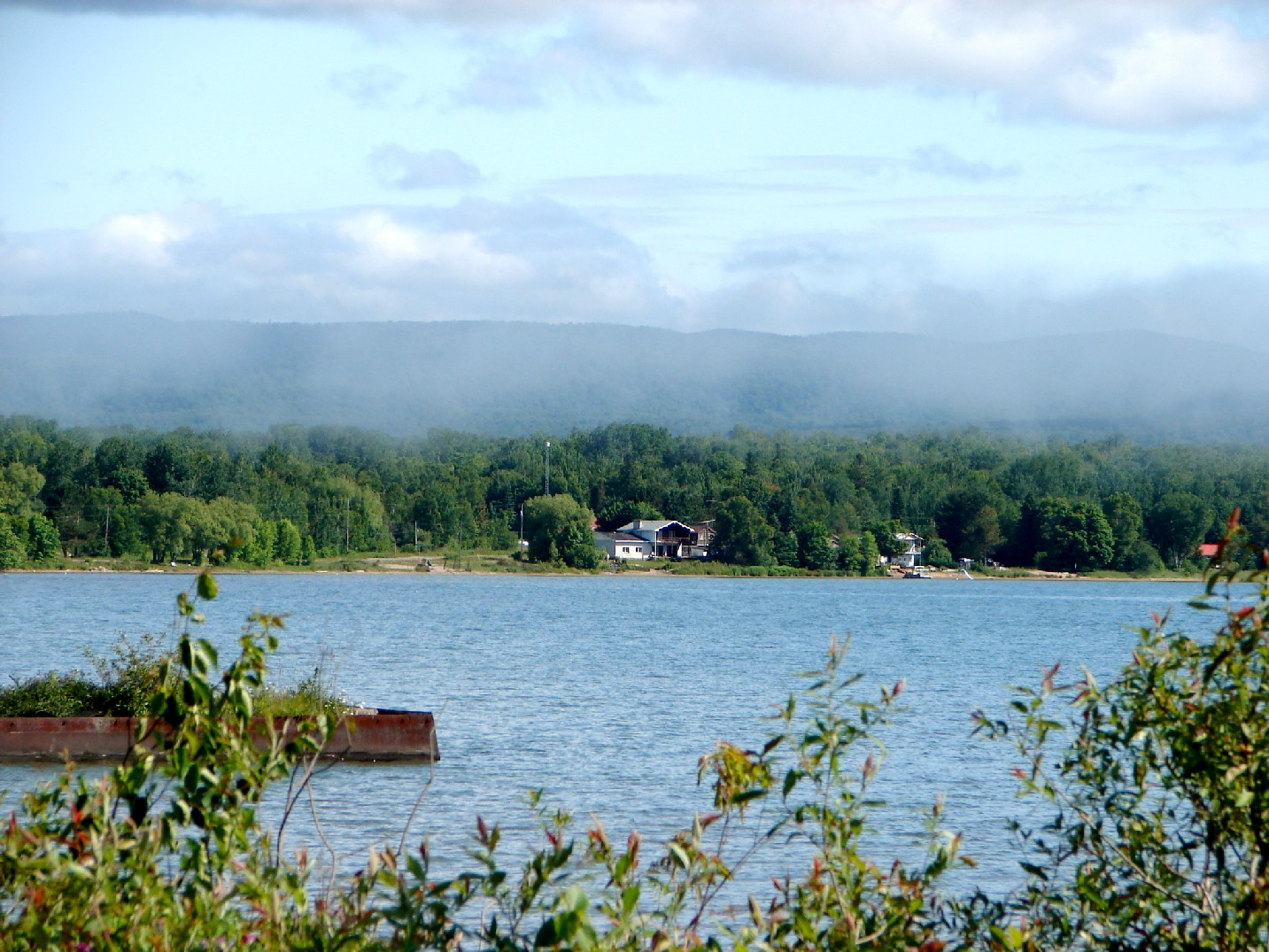
- Etymology: Badjiwanung Ojibwe for "water that bubbles up"
- Location in Ontario
- Coordinates: 46°55′34″N 84°36′23″W
- Country: Canada
- Province: Ontario
- District: Algoma
- Time zone: UTC-5 (Eastern Time Zone)
  - Summer (DST): UTC-4 (Eastern Time Zone)
- Postal code: P0S 1A0
- Area codes: 705, 249

Batchawana Bay is an unincorporated place and Compact Rural Community in Algoma District in Northeastern Ontario, Canada. It is also the name of a local services board, consisting of parts of the geographic townships of Fisher, Herrick, Ryan and Tilley. It is located approximately 50 kilometres (31 mi) north of Sault Ste. Marie, Ontario, on the shores of Batchawana Bay off Lake Superior.

The area is counted as part of Unorganized North Algoma District in Statistics Canada census data.

Batchawana Bay Provincial Park is nearby along Highway 17; the community itself is reached from Highway 17 by Ontario Highway 563.

== See also ==
- List of unincorporated communities in Ontario
