= Chippewa River (Ontario) =

River in Algoma District, Ontario, Canada

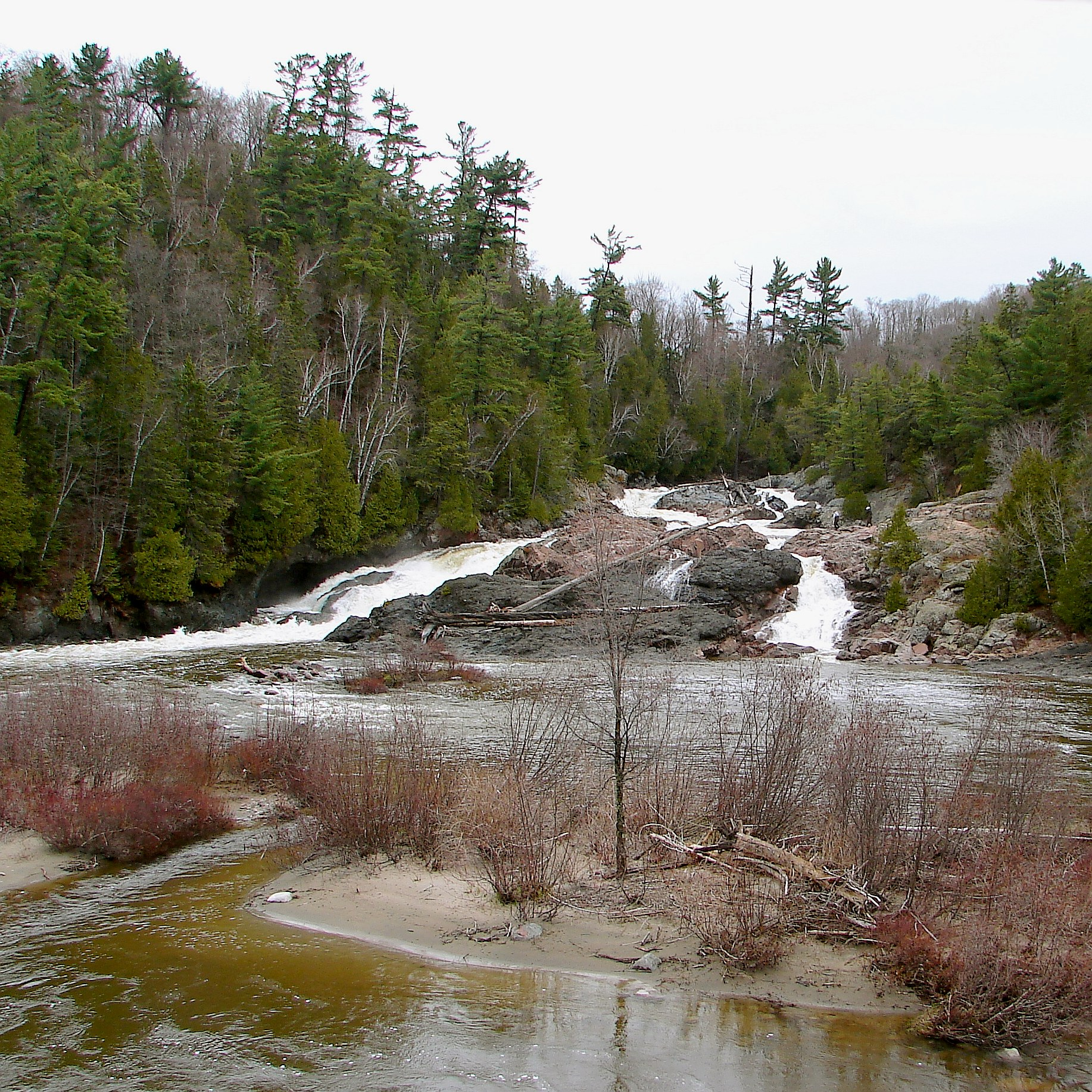

- Location of the mouth of the Chippewa River in Ontario

Location
- Country: Canada
- Province: Ontario
- Region: Northeastern Ontario
- District: Algoma District

Physical characteristics
- Source
  - location: Little Horne Lake
  - coordinates: 47°08′02.2″N 84°00′58.2″W
- Mouth
  - location: Batchawana Bay, Lake Superior
  - coordinates: 46°55′35.4″N 84°26′29.0″W

Chippewa River is located in Algoma District of Ontario, Canada, located approximately 40 kilometres (25 mi) north of Sault Ste. Marie, Ontario, flowing into Batchawana Bay of Lake Superior.

== See also ==
- List of rivers of Ontario
