= Cedar Lake (St. Croix County, Wisconsin) =

Lake in Polk County, Wisconsin, USA

- Location within Wisconsin Location within the United States
- Location: St. Croix County and Polk County, Wisconsin
- Coordinates: 45.2144°N 92.5710°W
- Primary inflows: Horse Creek
- Primary outflows: Cedar Creek, Apple River
- Basin countries: United States
- Surface area: 1,120 acres (450 ha)
- Max. depth: 32 ft (9.8 m)
- Shore length^{1}: 6.3 mi (10.1 km)
- Surface elevation: 912 ft (278 m)
- ^{1} Shore length is not a well-defined measure.

Cedar Lake is a lake located in St. Croix County and Polk County, Wisconsin, 3.5 miles west of Star Prairie. Cedar Lake is best known for its Muskellunge (Muskie) fishing. The lake is 1,120 acres (450 ha) in area and has a maximum depth of 32 ft (9.8 m). Fish commonly found in this lake include Northern Pike, Large Mouth Bass, Panfish, and small mouth bass. According to a 2016 Cedar Fisheries report published by the Wisconsin Department of Natural Resources, Cedar Lake is stocked with approximately 1000 musky fingerlings on a biennial basis. It is a “Trend Lake” and is surveyed on a four-year rotation.
