= Cedar Pond (Massachusetts) =

- Location within Massachusetts Location within the United States
- Location: Lakeville, Massachusetts
- Coordinates: 41.8110°N 70.9140°W
- Type: Lake
- Basin countries: United States

Cedar Pond is a small oval-shaped pond in the town of Lakeville, Massachusetts. It is located just off Somserset Lane from Long Point Road, which is easily accessible from Route 105. The pond is primarily used for irrigating nearby bogs and farmland.
