= Cedar Lake (Martin County, Minnesota) =

Lake in Minnesota, US

- Location within Minnesota
- Location: Martin County, Minnesota
- Coordinates: 43°47′23″N 94°44′2″W
- Type: Lake
- Surface elevation: 1,201 feet (366 m)

Cedar Lake is a lake in Martin County, in the U.S. state of Minnesota.

Cedar Lake was named for the red cedar trees near the lake.

== See also ==
- List of lakes in Minnesota
