= Rainbow Lake (New Jersey) =

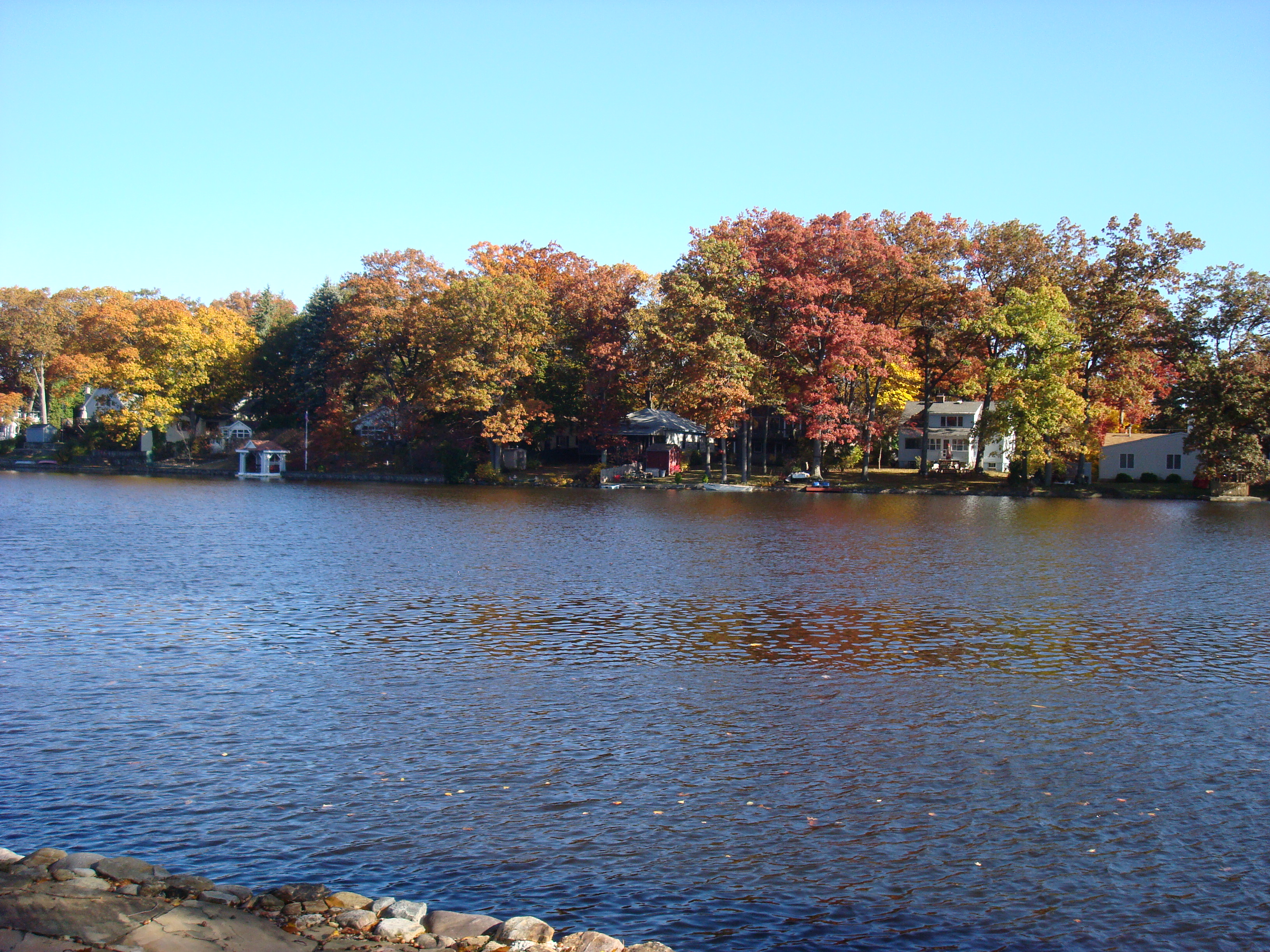
- Rainbow lake in autumn

- Location within New Jersey
- Location: Morris County, New Jersey
- Coordinates: 40°52′49″N 74°27′24″W
- Type: lake

Rainbow Lake a residential, man-made, spring-fed body of water, is located in Rainbow Lakes, a private community and unincorporated area within Parsippany-Troy Hills, New Jersey, United States. It is the largest of six lakes located in the community.

The lake is used exclusively by dues-paying members in good standing of the Rainbow Lakes Community Club (RLCC) for recreational activities, including: swimming, fishing, ice skating, and non-motor, non-sail boating. The Lake has a sand beach and two floating docks, which are for use by members and their guests especially throughout the summer months.

The RLCC Board of Trustees owns, operates and maintains the lake, other smaller lakes and several adjacent properties available to all members of the lake community and their guests. It also provides a clubhouse, volleyball court, horseshoe pits, tennis court, and playground, and organizes many community activities. The Bow Bar, located in the Rainbow Lakes Clubhouse, operates as a separate entity for adult members and their guests every weekend and for special events.

Rainbow Lakes is a member of an athletic organization called Hub Lakes, which includes other local communities: Lake Valhalla, Lake Arrowhead, Estling Lake, Indian Lake, Lake Intervale, Mountain Lakes, Lake Parsippany, Cedar Lake, Rock Ridge, Lake Telemark, and White Meadow Lake. Hub Lakes provides competition between the lakes in bowling, diving, golf, horseshoes, roller hockey, softball, swimming, table tennis, tennis, track & field, and volleyball.
