= Indian Lake (New Jersey) =

Populated place in Morris County, New Jersey, US

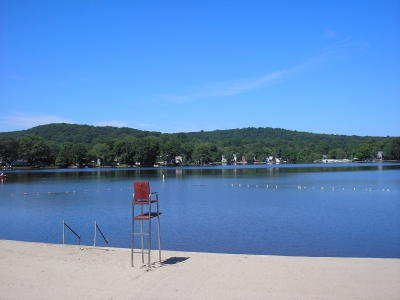
- The "Big Beach" or the Main Beach (summer 2006)

- Location within New Jersey Location within the United States
- Location: Denville Township, New Jersey
- Coordinates: 40.888640°N 74.488600°W
- Type: reservoir
- Basin countries: United States
- Surface elevation: 509 ft (155 m)

Indian Lake is a reservoir and unincorporated community situated 505 feet (154 m) above sea level in Denville Township, New Jersey. Snake Hill rises 780 feet (238 m) to its west and Chestnut Hill rises 640 feet (195 m) to its east.

== History ==
Originally the area of Indian Lake was quite rural with active farms. Besides the Hinchman farm, there was the Thomas Green farm on Chestnut Hill, the Hussa Farm on Franklin Road near U.S. Route 46, and the Ed Beam Farm in the North Shore Road area of Indian Lake.

The idea of Indian Lake was originally conceived by Joseph B. Righter in hopes of creating a development similar to nearby Mountain Lakes. He was a native of Denville and visualized that the waters of Den Brook could provide an excellent lake because of the surrounding terrain. He accumulated numerous parcels of land until he had accumulated approximately 300 acres (1.2 km^{2}) of land. Around 1920 he proceeded to clear the property. The trees were hauled by a yoke of oxen to a sawmill that was set up on site.

A dam was required to hold back the waters of the Den Brook (since replaced due to age). The Den Brook then started flooding the cleared land. The resulting lake, Lenape Lake, was named after the earliest inhabitants of the area, the Lenni Lenape Native Americans of the Delaware tribe.

Roads were laid out and the land divided into plots for year-round homes, the first plot being sold right next to the dam itself. Joseph B. Righter's dream for Lenape Lake was realized, but unfortunately he wouldn't live to see it developed, as he took ill and died in November 1922. The first house built on Lenape Lake would be built by his wife, Susan A. Righter, and still stands today at the corner of Southwynde Drive and Indian Road.

After a short time the A.D. Crane Company bought the property from the estate. They completely changed the entire original plans, including road plans, divided it into smaller lots, and instead of developing high-priced year-round homes, it was developed into a summer community. Subsequently they changed the name from Lenape Lake to Indian Lake but named the island Lenape Island.

Many of the new residents came west from Hudson, Bergen, and Essex counties. Originally non-lakefront lots could be bought for $300–$400, while lake front lots sold for about $1000.

Indian lake continued as a summer community for many years. In 1924 there were about 500 summer residents in Indian lake. The Great Depression years saw a few families move from New York City to the cottages they owned. The following generation's need for homes of their own and the post World War II housing shortage further accelerated the development of the community as a year-round residential area.

== Native American history ==
The earliest known inhabitants of the area were the Lenni Lenape of the Delaware tribe. What is now known as Lenape Island was once the site of a Native American settlement. The Rev. C.R. Snyder, pastor of the Denville M.E. Church, 1890–95, was a student of archeology and spent his time exploring the hills and fields of this area. He found on Lenape Island a great number of implements used by the local Native Americans, such as arrowheads, knives, fletchers, pestles, and pieces of pottery.

== Transportation ==
Indian Lake is in the heart of Denville Township, which itself is nicknamed the "Hub of Morris County". It is almost adjacent to eight-laned Interstate 80 and quite close in proximity to US Route 46 and New Jersey State Route 53, all three of these roads used heavily by motorists. At peak rush hour times, it is common for commuters, often not Indian Lake or even Denville residents, to use the narrow roads of Indian Lake designed in the 1920s as a shortcut in their routes, such as Franklin Road, North Shore Road, and Indian Road.

Indian Lake is also within walking distance of Downtown Denville, and it is common to see community residents walk or ride bicycles to the center of town, despite the heavy automobile traffic surrounding them.

== Community Club ==
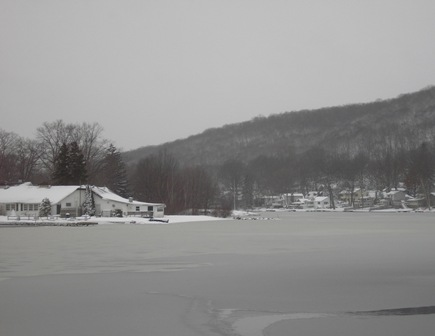
Indian Lake Clubhouse in winter 2006

In 1923, the property owners of Indian Lake saw the need for an organization to control the use of the lake. A meeting was held in the Denville School, and the Indian Lake Community Club was formed in order to promote and protect the interests of the residents of the community. It is a private association and use of the lake and its facilities require membership in the lake association. An elected board of officers and trustees administrate the lake association.

The Indian lake Community Club was formed under the first president of Indian Lake, Dr. W. Moore Gould. In 1923-1924, there were about 130 families in the community club. The dues at that time were $10 per family plus a charge for extra beach tags. During the depression years, many men and women were out of work, and the membership dues were paid by working for the club. Today the Indian Lake Community Club is an organization of approximately 500 households.

A large lakeside clubhouse is the focal point of the association. During the summer season Indian Lake's three beaches are staffed by lifeguards and are centers of activity. Boating, fishing, basketball, horseshoes, and other sporting activities are available. In addition, Indian Lake is available for water skiing and tubing, two popular activities.

Indian Lake is a member of the Hub Lakes association that includes a group of lakes in Morris County. Hub Lakes provides a multi-sport competition league in which Indian Lake members of all ages can participate. Sports include volleyball, swimming, diving, softball, horseshoes, golf, track and other sports. In recent years the track and dive team have been quite dominant in competition. The association also offers year-round structured programs and activities including swimming lessons, aerobics classes, dances, dinners, and other group events. Some fun events include a pig roast, a lip sync contest, a visit from Santa Claus and the Easter Bunny for children, a bass fishing contest, New Year's Eve party, casino night, clam bake, and Monday Night Football at the full-service bar. Many events are sponsored by sub-clubs, including a Woman's Club, Men's Club, Senior Club, Junior Club and the Aquatic Club. Lake membership also entitles members to rent the clubhouse for private events.

Information about lake activities can be found in the Indian Lake Crier, a monthly newsletter mailed to local residents.

== Indian Lake's King and Queen tradition ==
In 1927 the tradition of choosing, by popular vote, a king and queen, from teenagers living in the lake began. Except for a few years, a royal couple reigned each summer. During World War II the titles were changed to Mr. Victory and Miss Liberty. In 1944 a bathing beauty contest was held instead of a king and queen election since there were not many young men available. In 1947 the members were eager to pick up where they left off and another royal couple was elected.

The royal couple have been typically high school seniors and are selected by a vote, of all the lake members, conducted on Fun Weekend. Several weeks later a royal celebration is held which lasts all weekend. It starts with the official coronation, and party, on Friday night. Then on Saturday there is a semi-formal themed royal ball. This is followed on Sunday afternoon by a car parade around the lake typically followed by a picnic. It is a weekend full of tradition that all lake members are invited to enjoy. Since 1965 a Mr. & Mrs. Indian Lake represented by one of the adult couples has also been elected.
