= Cedar Lake (Scott County, Minnesota) =

Lake in the state of Minnesota, United States

- Location within Minnesota
- Location: Scott County
- Coordinates: 44°35′24″N 93°31′24″W
- Type: Lake
- Surface elevation: 942 feet (287 m)

Cedar Lake is a lake in Scott County, in the U.S. state of Minnesota.

Cedar Lake was named for the groves of red cedar near the lake.

== See also ==
- List of lakes in Minnesota
