= Batchawana Bay =

Bay in northeastern Ontario, Canada

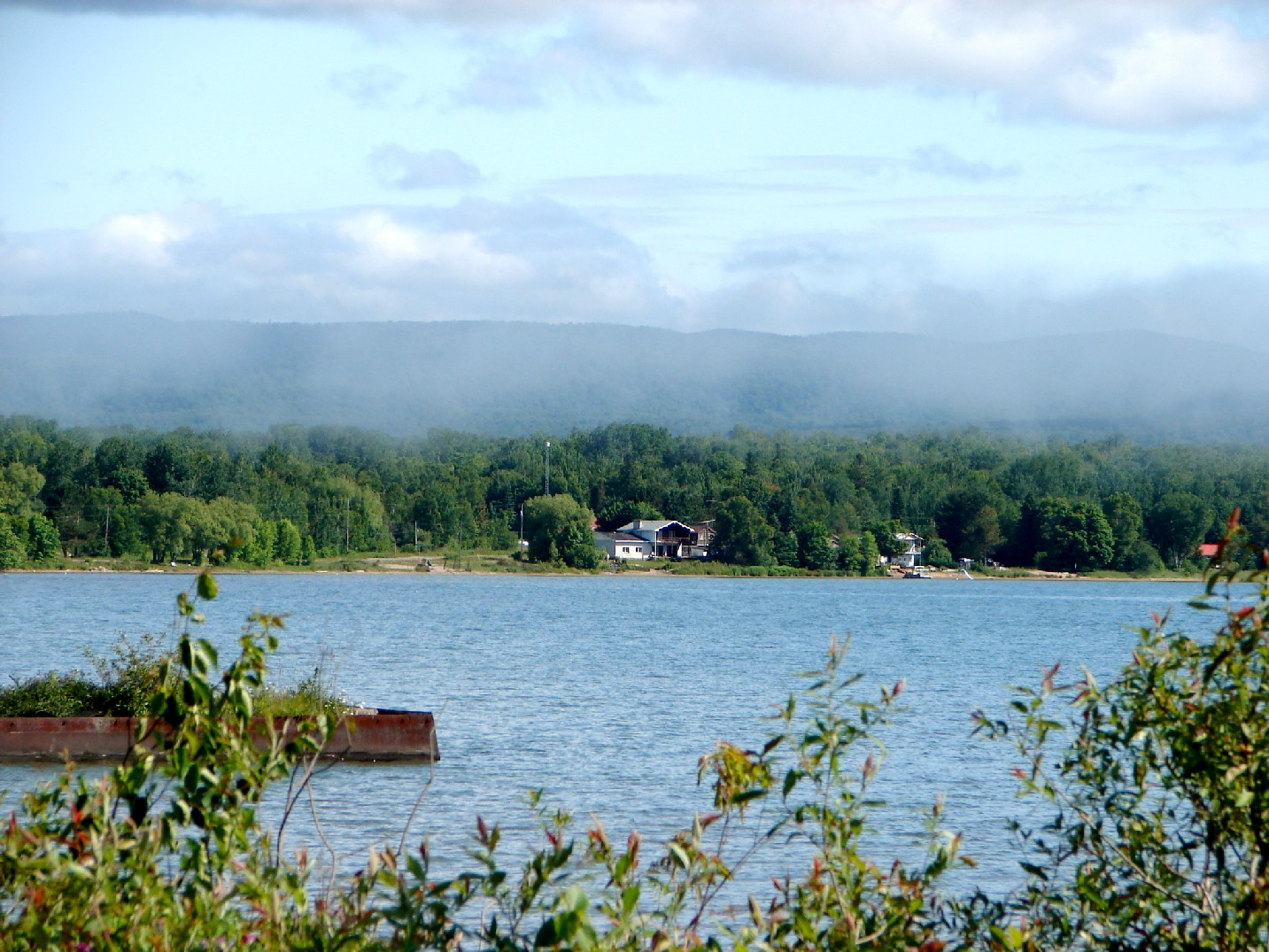

- Location in Ontario
- Location: Algoma District, Ontario, Canada
- Coordinates: 46°52′55″N 84°28′59″W
- Etymology: Badjiwanung, Ojibwe for "swift water/current"
- Part of: Whitefish Bay, Lake Superior
- Primary inflows: Batchawana River; Chippewa River; Harmony River
- Basin countries: Canada
- Islands: Batchawana Island

Batchawana Bay is a small bay in Algoma District in Northeastern Ontario, Canada. It is on the eastern shore of Lake Superior, approximately 50 kilometres (31 mi) north of Sault Ste. Marie.

The name "Batchawana" is derived from the Ojibwe word obatchiwanang (or spelled badjiwanung), meaning "current at the strait" or "narrows and swift water there", and refers to the turbulent or bubbling waters flowing between Batchawana Island and Sand Point where the lake narrows and a strong current and undertow results. The Ojibwe believed this was caused by an underwater spirit about to surface.

== Geography ==
The bay, part of Whitefish Bay, is formed on the north side by the Whitefish Point on the Canadian side of Lake Superior. Havilland and Harmony Bays are 2 smaller sub-bays within it.

Batchawana Island, with an area of more than 2,100 hectares (5,200 acres) and a coastline of 32 kilometres (20 mi), is a large and only island in the middle of the bay. This pristine undeveloped island was also reputedly the site of Spirit houses (elevated graves) of the Ojibwe. Batchawana Island and Whitefish Point are both important routes and stopovers for migratory birds.

Batchawana Bay Provincial Park is located on the northern shore of the bay, and the unincorporated place and Compact Rural Community of Batchawana Bay is on the northwest shore of the bay. The community is along Highway 563.

Nearby Batchawana Mountain (47°03′55″N 84°24′39″W) is the fourth highest point in Ontario at 653 metres (2,142 ft).

== History ==
A fur trading post was established on Batchawana Island near the mouth of the Batchawana River prior to 1814 by clerks of the North West Company. In 1824 it was abandoned as an unpaying venture but reopened some years later. After the merger of the North West Company with the Hudson's Bay Company, Batchawana (spelled "Batchewana" or "Bachawinna" at the time) continued to operate as a HBC winter outpost for Michipicoten Post until 1870.

Batchawana Bay has long been an important fishing site for the Ojibwe. One settlement was near Sand Point, west of the Chippewa River. Many of these men, seeking employment, moved to the settlement at Batchawana after the mill opened in 1871. In 1904 25 men were employed at Batchawana with two tugs. During the 1920s, Chicago-based Booth Fisheries Company maintained here a 600-ton capacity ice house with shed. The 500-ft long Booth dock deteriorated and was removed in the 1940s, and their large plant in town was later lost to fire.

In the early 1920s, the largest fish ever recorded in the Great Lakes was caught by Frank Lapoint in the bay. A sturgeon, it was reportedly 90 years old, measured 2.25 m (7.5 ft) and weighed 140 kg (310 lb).

The bay was historically notable as the dividing point separating the two Robinson Treaty areas between the Crown and the Ojibwe people.

== See also ==
- Goulais Bay - adjacent bay to the south
