= Cedar Lakes =

- Location of the Cedar Lakes in Ontario
- Location: Algoma, Ontario, Canada
- Coordinates: 47°02′21″N 84°35′20″W
- Type: Lake
- Part of: Great Lakes Basin
- Primary inflows: Carp River
- Surface elevation: 377 m (1,237 ft)

The Cedar Lakes are a series of small lakes in geographic Palmer Township in the Unorganized North Part of Algoma in Northeastern Ontario, Canada.

The lakes are in the Great Lakes Basin, and the primary inflow, at the north end of the series, and outflow, at the south end of the series, is the Carp River. The Carp River flows to Lake Superior.

== See also ==
- List of lakes in Ontario
