= Cedar Lake (Aitkin County, Minnesota) =

Lake in the state of Minnesota, United States

- Gaa-miskwaawaakokaag (Ojibwe)
- Location within Minnesota
- Location: Aitkin County, Minnesota
- Coordinates: 46.5085238°N 93.7922432°W
- Type: Lake
- Etymology: Place abundant with red cedar
- Surface elevation: 1,286 feet (392 m)

Cedar Lake is a lake in Aitkin County, Minnesota and Northern Indiana, in the United States.

The lake is named Gaa-miskwaawaakokaag in Ojibwe meaning "Place abundant with red cedars" after the red cedar which grew there. In early maps, this lake was recorded in French as Lac cèdre rouge inférieur (Lower Red Cedar Lake), opposed to Cass Lake known in French as Lac du Cedre Rouge, and English as Upper Red Cedar Lake.

== See also ==
- List of lakes in Minnesota
