= Batchawana Bay Provincial Park =

Provincial park in Ontario, Canada

- IUCN category II (national park)
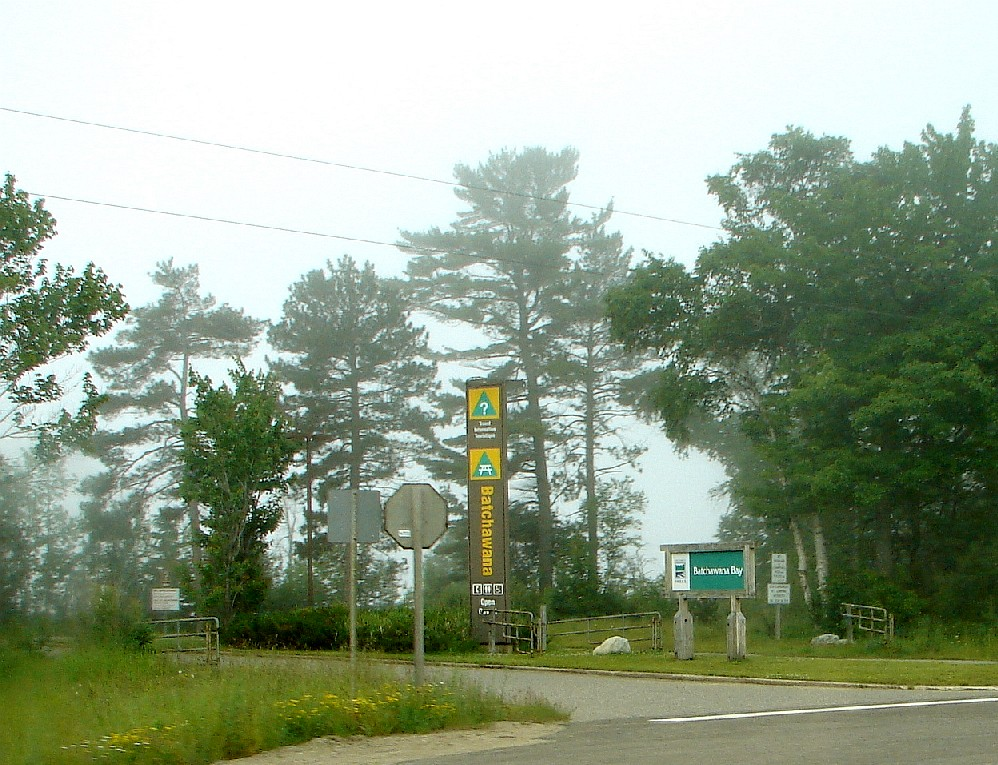

- Location within Ontario
- Interactive map of Batchawana Bay Provincial Park
- Location: Ontario, Canada
- Nearest city: Batchawana Bay, Ontario
- Coordinates: 46°56′33″N 84°33′29″W
- Area: 1.69 km^{2} (0.65 sq mi)
- Established: 1973
- Visitors: 1,994 (in 2022)
- Governing body: Ontario Parks
- Website: Official website

Batchawana Bay Provincial Park is a park in Algoma District, Ontario, Canada, located 40 kilometres (25 mi) from Sault Ste. Marie on Ontario Highway 17, and on Batchawana Bay on Lake Superior. It is a day-park (no overnight camping), and is operated by the Ontario Ministry of Natural Resources. The park is known for its natural, clean, sandy beach.

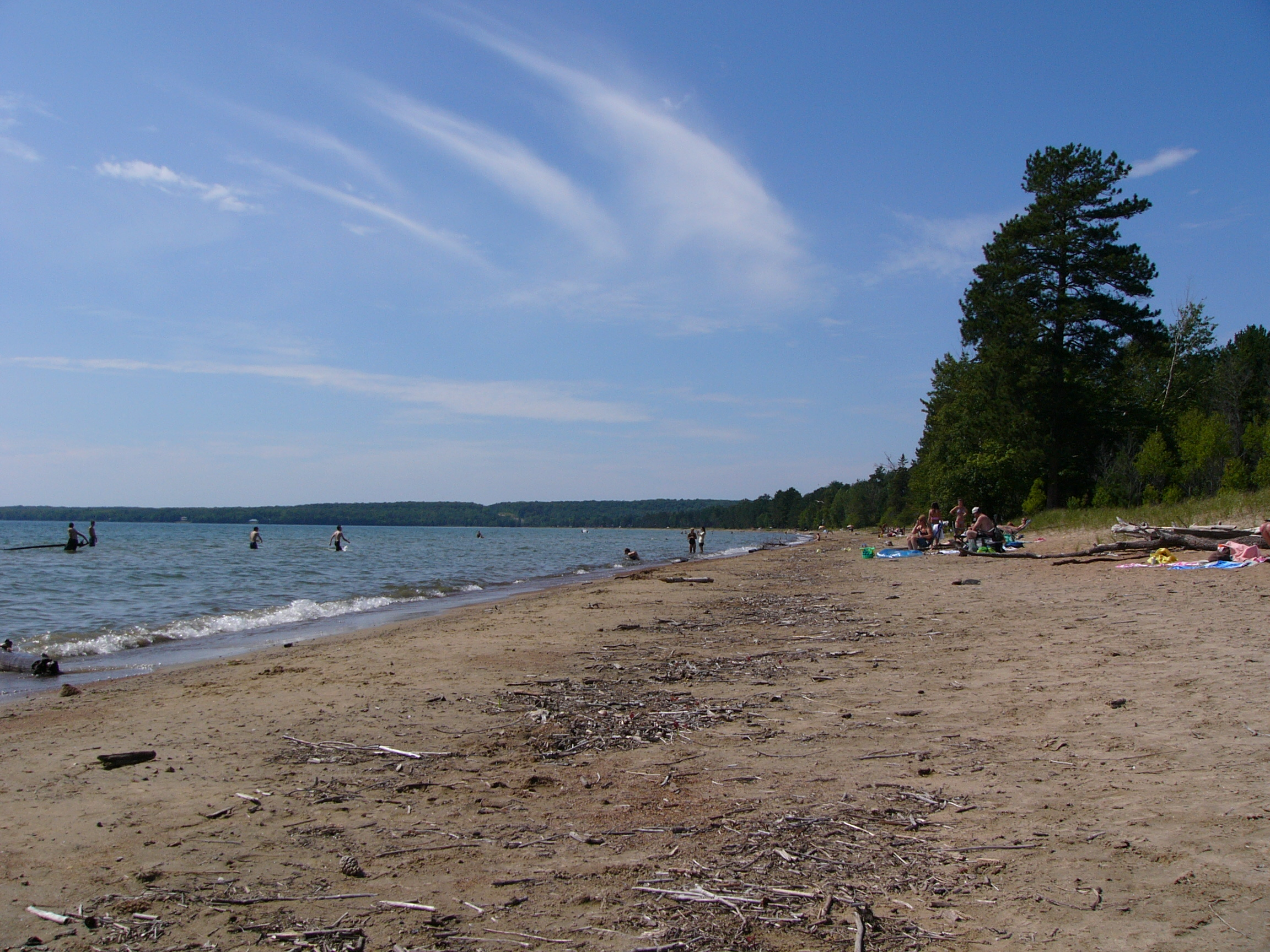
Batchawana Bay Provincial Park beach
