= Carlos Heitor Cony =

Brazilian journalist and writer (1926–2018)

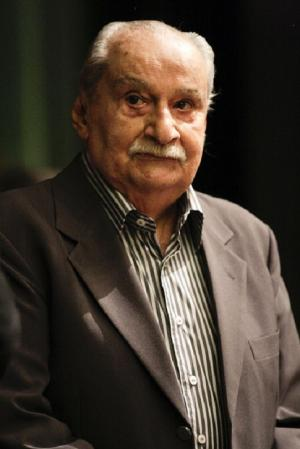
- Born: March 14, 1926; Rio de Janeiro
- Died: January 5, 2018 (aged 91); Rio de Janeiro
- Writing career
- Notable works: Pessach: a Travessia; Quase Memória

Carlos Heitor Cony (March 14, 1926 – January 5, 2018) was a Brazilian journalist and writer. He was a member of the Brazilian Academy of Letters (Portuguese: Academia Brasileira de Letras).

Cony viewed himself as center-leftist and faced persecution under the military government in the 1960s. Four of his works were adapted to movies. He was a columnist at the Brazilian newspaper Folha de S.Paulo.

Cony died in Rio de Janeiro on January 5, 2018, of multiple organ failure at the age of 91.

== Biography ==
Son of the journalist Ernesto Cony Filho, considered "obscure," and Julieta Moraes Cony, Carlos Heitor Cony grew up in the Lins de Vasconcelos neighborhood, in the northern zone of Rio de Janeiro. He was considered "mute" by his family until the age of four, when he spoke his first words reacting to a noise caused by a seaplane in Niterói. Due to this problem, which was only resolved when the writer was 15 years old through surgery, Cony was literate at home and studied at the Archdiocesan Seminary of São José in the Rio Comprido neighborhood until 1945, abandoning it before ordination as a priest. The following year, he began studying at the Faculty of Philosophy of the University of Brazil, but interrupted the course in 1947, and had his first experience as a journalist at the Jornal do Brasil covering his father's vacation.

He worked as a public servant of the Rio de Janeiro City Council until 1952, when he became an editor at the Rádio Jornal do Brasil. In 1955, he started working in the press room of the Rio de Janeiro City Hall as a reporter for Jornal do Brasil replacing his father, who had suffered a cerebral ischemia. That same year, he wrote his first novel, O Ventre. In 1956, he submitted the work to the Manuel Antonio de Almeida Prize, organized by the city hall. The contest jury considered the book "very good," but denied him the prize for being "too strong." In nine days, he wrote and submitted a second book, A Verdade de Cada Um, and won the contest the following year. Another book by Cony, Tijolo de Segurança, would win the same prize in 1958. These three initial books of the author were released in 1958, 1959, and 1960, respectively, by the publisher Civilização Brasileira.

In 1960, he joined the Rio news outlet Correio da Manhã as a copyeditor and editorial writer. Between 1963 and 1965, he maintained a column in the newspaper Folha de S.Paulo, sharing space with the poetess Cecília Meirelles. Initially having supported the 1964 Brazilian coup d'état that removed João Goulart from the presidency, Cony regretted his adherence and quickly came to oppose the coup openly, being arrested six times during the military regime. As an editorialist for Correio da Manhã, he wrote critical pieces about the acts of the military dictatorship, which were compiled into a book, O Ato e o Fato, released still in 1964. Pressured by his political stance, he ended up resigning from the newspaper.

In one of the six arrests during the military regime, a colonel asked me why I wrote so much nonsense in the newspaper I was working for. I agreed with him. To this day, I think I have done nothing else.

— Carlos Heitor Cony

After facing eight lawsuits, three inquiries, and being arrested six times for "opinion offenses," he left the country in 1967, self-exiling in Cuba for a year upon being invited by the Cuban government to participate in the jury of the Casa de las americas Prize. When he returned to Brazil the following year, he was invited by entrepreneur Adolpho Bloch to work on the magazines published by Bloch Editores. During much of his time at Bloch, between 1968 and 2000, he set aside fiction literature. He published his last fiction book in 1973, Pilatos. Dedicating himself almost entirely to journalism, he was a columnist, special reporter, and editor of publications like Manchete, Desfile, Fatos & Fotos and Ele Ela.

Besides working in print media, Cony was also the director of teledramaturgy at Rede Manchete between 1985 and 1990, having written the first chapters of the station's first miniseries, Marquesa de Santos, the project of the soap opera Dona Beija, and the original idea of Kananga do Japão along with Adolpho Bloch.

In 1993, Cony was invited by journalist Jânio de Freitas to return to writing for Folha de S.Paulo, taking over the "Rio" column, previously occupied by writer Otto Lara Rezende. The first column in Folha was published on March 14 of that year. Cony wrote for the newspaper until his death. After 22 years away from fiction literature, in 1995, he released Quase Memória, a book that marked his return to the genre and became one of his most famous works after selling over 400,000 copies, also receiving the Jabuti Prize in 1996 in the category Book of the Year – Fiction.

Cony received a controversial pension from the federal government due to legislation that authorizes payment of compensation to those who suffered material and moral damages during the military dictatorship.

In 2013, the writer suffered a fall at the Frankfurt Book Fair, causing the presence of a clot in his brain. Weakened by the accident and lymphoma cancer that had accompanied him since 2001, Cony died on January 5, 2018, in Rio de Janeiro, due to intestinal problems and multiple organ failure.

== Works ==
=== Novels ===
- 1958 – O Ventre
- 1959 – A Verdade de Cada Dia
- 1960 – Tijolo de Segurança
- 1961 – Informação ao Crucificado
- 1962 – Matéria de Memória
- 1964 – Antes, o Verão
- 1965 – Balé Branco
- 1967 – Pessach: A Travessia
- 1973 – Pilatos
- 1995 – Quase Memória
- 1996 – O Piano e a Orquestra
- 1997 – A casa do Poeta Trágico
- 1999 – Romance sem Palavras
- 2001 – O Indigitado
- 2003 – A Tarde da sua Ausência
- 2006 – O Adiantado da Hora
- 2007 – A Morte e a Vida
- 2022 – Paixão segundo Mateus

=== Chronicles ===
- 1963 – Da Arte de Falar Mal
- 1964 – O Ato e o Fato
- 1965 – Posto Seis
- 1998 – Os Anos mais Antigos do Passado
- 1999 – O Harém das Bananeiras
- 2002 – O Suor e a Lágrima
- 2004 – O Tudo ou o Nada
- 2009 – Para ler na Escola

Honorary titles
Preceded by Herberto Sales	5th Academic of the 3rd Chair of the Brazilian Academy of Letters; 2000–2018	Succeeded by Joaquim Falcão
