= Corpo Santo =

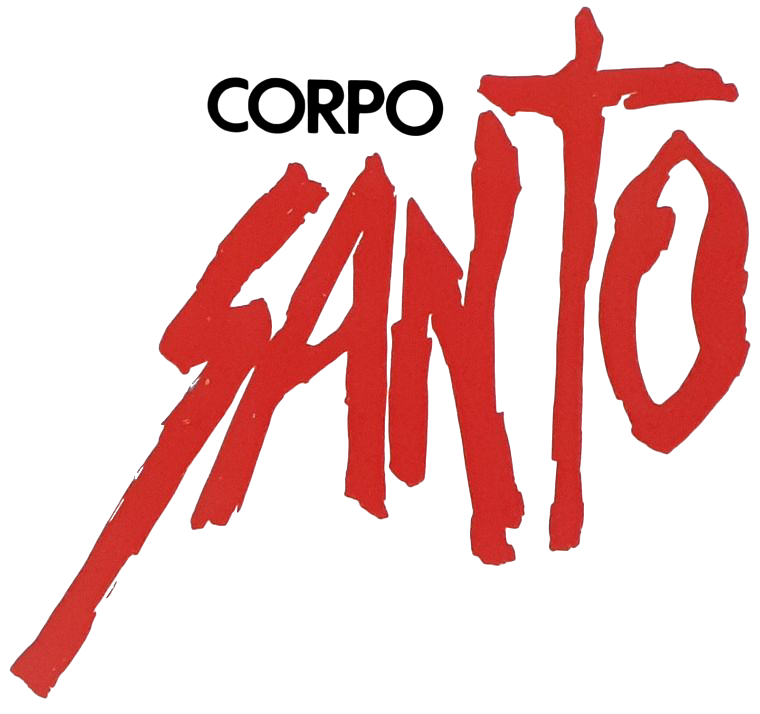
- Genre: Drama; Thriller; Crime; Fantasy; Romance
- Created by: José Louzeiro
- Written by: Cláudio MacDowell; Eliane Garcia; Leila Míccolis; Maria Cláudia Oliveira
- Directed by: José Wilker
- Starring: Main cast: Christiane Torloni; Reginaldo Faria; Sílvia Buarque; Nathalia Timberg; Lídia Brondi; Otávio Augusto; Jonas Bloch; Sérgio Viotti; Ângela Vieira Luís Carlos Arutin; Cristina Pereira; Rogério Fróes; Ana Lúcia Torre; Marcelo Serrado Bel Kutner; (See more)
- Opening theme: "Um Lugar do Mundo", by Roupa Nova
- Ending theme: "Um Lugar do Mundo", by Roupa Nova
- Composers: Ricardo Feghali; Nando
- Country of origin: Brazil
- Original language: Portuguese
- No. of episodes: 162

Production
- Executive producer: Alexandre Ishikawa
- Production locations: Rio de Janeiro (Copacabana and Lapa); São Paulo; United States (Los Angeles and New York)
- Editors: Sérgio Louzada; Carlos Eduardo Kerr
- Running time: 60 minutes
- Production company: Rede Manchete

Original release
- Network: Rede Manchete
- Release: 30 March – 2 October 1987

Corpo Santo is a Brazilian telenovela created by José Louzeiro for Rede Manchete, aired on March 30 and October 2, 1987, with 162 chapters. Written by Louzeiro, with supervised by Wilson Aguiar Filho, with the collaboration of Cláudio MacDowell, Eliane Garcia, Leila Míccolis and Maria Cláudia Oliveira, under the direction of Ary Coslov and Walter Campos and general direction by José Wilker.

It features Christiane Torloni, Reginaldo Faria, Sílvia Buarque, Nathalia Timberg, Lídia Brondi, Otávio Augusto, Jonas Bloch and Sérgio Viotti in the main roles.

== Plot ==
The beautiful widow Simone Reski moves with her family – her daughter Lucinha, her aunt Maria, and her maid Isaura – from the suburbs to downtown Rio de Janeiro. She immediately meets Téo, a friendly bachelor and bon vivant, unaware that he is involved with the video smuggling and pornographic film production mafia.

Téo is interested in Simone because he sees Lucinha as a new nymphet star for his films. Lucinha ends up being forced by Téo and his gang to participate in one of these films. However, the criminals are in for a surprise. Her body doesn't appear in the recording. Unbeknownst to them, she possesses paranormal powers.

The determined journalist Bárbara Diniz tries to unravel the mysteries of Grego's mafia to reach police officers involved with the death squad. The unscrupulous Grego uses illicit and political resources to bolster the organization, which relies on three activities: smuggling, nightclubs in Lapa, and the pornographic film production company.

== Cast ==
Actor	Character
Christiane Torloni	Simone Reski
Reginaldo Faria	Téo Ribeiro
Sílvia Buarque	Lúcia Reski (Lucinha)
Nathalia Timberg	Maria Rita Reski
Lídia Brondi	Bárbara Diniz
Otávio Augusto	Delegado Arturzão
Jonas Bloch	Giovanni Kepler (Russo)
Sérgio Viotti	Nicholas Kazan (Grego)
Ângela Vieira	Mara Kazan
Luís Carlos Arutin	Perito Vidigal
Cristina Pereira	Isaura
Rogério Fróes	Perdigão Brynner
Ana Lúcia Torre	Marta Brynner
Marcelo Serrado	Carlinhos Brynner
Bel Kutner	Renata Brynner
Chico Diaz	Orlando Kazan
Ivan Setta	Detetive Pé Frio
Antônio Pitanga	Patrício
Nildo Parente	Rodrigo Viana
Alexandre Marques	Anselmo
Roberto Frota	Delegado Portinho
Germano Vezzani	Fernando
Roberto Lopes	Detetive Anísio
Tião D'Ávila	Detetive Silas
Francisco Dantas	Detetive Bittar
Expedito Barreira	Detetive Gaspar
Henrique Pires	Dr. Marcos Felipe
Maria Alves	Isadora
Eliane Narduchi	Marina
Divana Brandão	Wanda
Lu Modesto	Valéria
Antonio Gonzales	Eduardo
Márcia Rodrigues	Sheila
Ariel Coelho	Aderbal
Leina Krespi	Carminda
Luiz Carlos Niño	Sérgio
Alexandre Zacchia	Esfolado
Júlia Miranda	Zica
Gilson Moura	Ventoinha
Christina Bittencourt	Estela
Marie Vielmont	Profª. Marinalva
Paschoal Villaboim	Zé da Paixão

=== Special appearances ===
Actor	Character
José Wilker	Ulisses Queiróz
Maitê Proença	Adriana Queiróz
Guida Vianna	Ofélia
Rodrigo Santiago	Lucas Rezende
Cidinha Milan	Marinalva
Luís de Lima	Emir Zarlan
Denise Dumont	Vera
Ary Coslov	Mário Joyce
Clementino Kelé	Dr. Montoro
Clemente Viscaíno	Dr. Gonçalves
Lu Mendonça	Lenira
Alby Ramos	Parafunda
Isio Ghelman	Gilles
Nádia Nardini	Marlene
Ricardo Fróes	Luiz da Padaria
Isabel Tereza	Gabi
Sandro Solviat	Ramos
Beth Berardo	Mônica
Marco Miranda	Jair

== Production ==
=== Start of filming ===
Production of the telenovela Corpo Santo was announced in December 1986, with the definitive title of Rede Manchete's next soap opera, replacing Mania de Querer. The plot was conceived as a "reportage soap opera", blending real police cases from Rio de Janeiro with modern television language, drawing inspiration from the Aída Curi and Mônica cases. During pre-production, Manchete underwent a significant internal change. On December 5, 1986, director Herval Rossano left the network after disagreements with general director Zevi Ghivelder. According to reports, there were creative differences and conflicts regarding the cast and direction of the drama. One publication suggested that Ghivelder attributed the declining ratings of previous telenovelas to him, as well as a previous disagreement involving actress Sônia Clara, Ghivelder's wife.

In January 1987, Manchete officially began production on Corpo Santo, now with José Wilker as director and overall director. Written by José Louzeiro, the series was directed by Wilker, Walter Campos, Ary Coslov, and Cláudio MacDowell, with collaboration from Eliana Garcia. Walter Campos and MacDowell also served as screenwriters. The telenovela was planned to have approximately 120 episodes, and filming began on January 26 of the same year. The production marked José Louzeiro's first telenovela and promised to renew the network's momentum in the genre. José Wilker stated that he had to be very careful with Corpo Santo, as it was his first telenovela as a director at Manchete. According to Wilker, the production was "more democratic and collective." Filming took place in Rio de Janeiro, in urban locations and studios, with scenes shot in São Paulo and abroad.

On the eve of its premiere, José Wilker assessed the quality of the first 10 episodes, describing the telenovela as "the result of passionate work" and an "investment in the performance of the actors and actresses." He praised the "chemistry" and "extraordinary" performances of the cast, which, in his opinion, were "far above the average achieved in most Brazilian productions." Wilker described the telenovela as a story of "love and humor" with elements of a crime thriller, such as "sex, violence, and action," but denied any intention of sensationalism. For him, the humor in the telenovela was "epic, Brechtian" in nature, and the fundamental objective was to "entertain the audience" while offering a humorous social critique. He cited as an example the building manager of the building where Simone Reski's family lives, who uses the condominium fees for his own benefit.

=== Cast selection ===
The cast of Corpo Santo continued to develop throughout pre-production and the beginning of filming. In addition to the already confirmed Reginaldo Faria, Mariana de Moraes, and Nathalia Timberg, the production announced the participation of Jonas Bloch, Nildo Parente, Márcia Rodrigues, Divana Brandão, Ivan Setta, Paschoal Villaboim, Leina Krespi, Ana Lúcia Torre, Roberto Frota and Cristina Pereira. The main cast consisted of Christiane Torloni, Reginaldo Faria, Lídia Brondi, Jonas Bloch, Nathalia Timberg, Otávio Augusto, Luiz Carlos Arutin, Roberto Frota, Nildo Parente, Jonas Mello, and Luís de Lima. Jonas Bloch played the villain Giovanni Kepler, known as Russo. The actor dedicated himself entirely to the role, even turning down four film and theater offers to participate in the telenovela. Later, the casting of actor Luís de Lima was confirmed for José Louzeiro's telenovela. Antônio Pitanga and Lídia Brondi were also announced as part of the main cast, with Lídia playing reporter Bárbara Diniz. Rodrigo Santiago also joined the cast as Lucas, a close friend of Bárbara Diniz. Beth Berardo was cast as Mônica, a psychologist. Nathalia Timberg played Maria Rita Reski, Simone's sister. Another addition to the cast was Eliane Narduchi, as Marina, a prostitute. The cast also included the characters Ramos, a criminal played by Sandro Solviat, and Detective Sila, played by Tião D'Ávila.

Meanwhile, Manchete, under the direction of José Wilker, expressed interest in hiring actress Lúcia Veríssimo for one of the soap opera's leading roles. Veríssimo was at a contractual impasse with TV Globo, where she starred in Roda de Fogo, and Manchete was awaiting the green light to try to sign her.

The search for the lead role, Simone, faced some setbacks. Sônia Braga was the first to be offered the role, but declined to prioritize her international career. The solution came when actress Christiane Torloni was cast as the character. The casting came after Torloni broke her contract with TV Globo, motivated by her dissatisfaction with the character she played in Selva de Pedra. Negotiations with the actress were already "well underway" in early January 1987.

Sônia Braga turned down the role of Adriana, which was to be a cameo filmed in Los Angeles, United States. The role was taken on by Maitê Proença, who played fashion designer Adriana, a character involved in a video smuggling scheme with José Wilker's character. Maitê accepted the invitation to complete a commitment to the film A Dama do Cine Xangai. The first scenes of Corpo Santo were filmed in New York, directed by Ary Coslov and Walter Campos. The characters Alexis (José Wilker) and Adriana (Maitê Proença) appear in these scenes, involved in the smuggling of pornographic films. Their participation, however, was limited to the first few episodes, and the actress would not return to the telenovela. Denise Dumont was another actress hired for a cameo, appearing in scenes filmed in Los Angeles alongside José Wilker. The idea of attracting audiences with sophisticated appearances abroad was one of the pillars of the network's strategy.

=== Investment in cast and technical team ===
On January 18, 1987, Manchete's ambitious project was unveiled. General director Rubens Furtado stated that the network was expanding on all fronts, hiring not only new actors, but also writers, lighting technicians, producers, and set designers. He emphasized that the investment in new talent included competitive salaries, in some cases nearly double what Globo was offering. For the technical team, Manchete hired 30 new professionals, including filmmaker and art producer Ana Maria Magalhães, editors Eduardo Ribeiro and Sérgio Louzada, as well as directors and producers Eduardo Figueira, Caique Botkay, Luiz Fernando Carvalho, Paulo Indio, Beto Leão, Ari Coslov, Lúcia Fernanda, and set designers Raul Neves and Irênio Maia. The network also modernized its studios in Água Grande, installing air conditioning to improve working conditions. The soap opera sold eight sponsorship quotas, with a budget of 3.1 million cruzados.

=== Additional details about the cast and crew ===
The character Simone Reski, played by Christiane Torloni, was described as a woman of courage, love, and a mother. The character is a "widow of a painter" and owner of a bookstore, with the plot involving the need to sell her business. The plot would also feature Silvia Buarque as Lúcia (Lucinha) and Lu Modesto as Valéria. Lúcia, Simone's 16-year-old daughter, is said to have paranormal abilities. Lúcia would be the first to detect a murder. Silvia Buarque filmed important scenes at the Institute of Applied Psychology, and her character would gain greater prominence in the upcoming chapters.

The character Bárbara Diniz, played by Lídia Brondi, is "author José Louzeiro's homage to a real journalist." Louzeiro described the character as a "modern woman" and "totally committed." Lídia Brondi, who had previously worked on the series Márcia e seus problemas (1974) on TVE Brasil, preferred to follow her "intuition" when constructing the character, rather than trying to imitate the real reporter.

The character Téo, played by Reginaldo Faria, was described as a "scoundrel" with a "false air of kindness." To create the character, Téo wore Ray-Ban sunglasses, making him unforgettable. The script, described as having a tone of "Latin American magical realism," was a major draw for the cast. Actor Reginaldo Faria revealed that one of the reasons he accepted the invitation was the presence of José Louzeiro as the writer, whom he considered a "great author." The final scenes of the telenovela were to be filmed entirely in Peru.

On March 20, 1987, during a launch cocktail party, Manchete presented a clip of the new telenovela to the press and guests. The event, held at the Palladium in São Paulo, was attended by part of the cast, including Reginaldo Faria, Christiane Torloni, Lidia Brondi, Carlos Arutim, Otávio Augusto, Silvia Buarque, Rogério Fróes, and Jonas Bloch. The absence of José Wilker, who served as director of telenovela, was one of the highlights of the evening.

Jonas Bloch described his character, the criminal Russo, as a figure who "openly denounces the violence and corruption" of Brazilian society. Bloch emphasized that Russo was created to break the prejudice that criminals in Brazil are always "toothless, ignorant, and black," stating that "the greatest Brazilian marginalization is middle-class and above." He also criticized Brazilian censorship, which, according to him, made cuts to the telenovela under the pretext of protecting the audience, but in reality was "colonized." Bloch defended the novel's innovative language, which he considered an alternative for audiences "tired of seeing and hearing stories about pretty boys who want to marry the girl."

=== Premiere ===
The official premiere of the telenovela Corpo Santo was announced for March 30, 1987, with airing scheduled for 9:30pm, a date that was changed in relation to the initial planning of March 23, taking the place of Mania de Querer.

=== Plot development and events ===
Author José Louzeiro claimed to have prepared "the spiciest seasonings" for the telenovela's "countdown," with the plot "rising from crime to sex." The narrative gained new momentum with the death of protagonist Simone Reski (Christiane Torloni), a landmark event that reshaped the course of the story. The decision to eliminate the central female figure was seen as bold and critical. Manchete management denied rumors of a disagreement between Torloni and Adolpho Bloch (founder of Rede Manchete), maintaining that the actress's departure had been planned as a dramatic turning point in the narrative. The actress herself praised the network's courage in adopting this direction.

According to Louzeiro, the heroine's death was intended to demystify the traditional role of the protagonist in telenovelas, exposing the vulnerability of ordinary citizens in the face of violence and the Brazilian social crisis. The character, focused on everyday issues such as survival and financial hardship, represented the simplicity and reality of the viewer. The author also criticized the "white, heterosexual happiness standard" of conventional telenovelas, claiming that heroines are addictive and intoxicating. With this, he sought to reach the "peak of emotion" and create space for new developments in the plot, which he described as "a dramaturgy of popular and agile motivation."

The scene of Simone's murder was filmed in a thicket near the Manchete studios in the northern zone of Rio de Janeiro (Guadalupe) and aired in the episode broadcast on July 15. The sequence involved her daughter Lúcia (Silvia Buarque), who possessed paranormal abilities and "saw" the crime through her father's eyes. After her mother's death, the character gained credibility with the police, gaining importance in the narrative.

Reporter Bárbara (Lídia Brondi), initially a supporting character, rises in the plot after being fired from the newspaper for insisting on exposing the actions of a death squad known as the "Death Squad." Bárbara struggles between her professional ideals and her passion for Téo (Reginaldo Faria), a dangerous criminal. Their relationship intensifies after Téo saves her from a threat from the squad, beginning a romance marked by moral tension.

The villain Téo is visited in prison by a hitman hired by Russo (Jonas Bloch), but survives the attack and retaliates violently. Russo, revealed to be a "closeted homosexual" obsessed with Téo, is described as an ambiguous character, alternating between apparent kindness and profound self-loathing. His conflicted relationship with the protagonist contributes to the story's tragic outcome.

The telenovela also addressed themes such as baby trafficking —including the character Vanda (Divana Brandão), whose child is kidnapped — and the AIDS epidemic. Marina (Ellene Narduchi), a prostitute, contracts the virus, making Corpo Santo the first Brazilian telenovela to directly address the disease. In the final moments, the narrative intensifies with the clash between Lúcia and Russo. The young woman confronts her mother's killer and senses his negative energy, receiving death threats. The tension reaches a peak with Téo's arrival at the scene, concluding the sequence with a direct confrontation between the two rivals.

=== End of filmings ===
The filmings of Corpo Santo were completed in mid-September 1987. The last chapter was shown on October 2, 1987, totaling 162 chapters.

== Soundtrack ==
=== Corpo Santo – Trilha Sonora Original ===
Corpo Santo – Trilha Sonora Original

Soundtrack album by Various artists
- Released: July 1987
- Genres: MPB; pop; romantic; soul; pop rock
- Length: 50:54
- Language: Portuguese
- Label: RCA · Bloch Produções

Corpo Santo chronology
Corpo Santo – Trilha Sonora Original (1987)	Corpo Santo – Trilha Sonora Original Internacional (1987)

Corpo Santo – Trilha Sonora Original is the soundtrack to the Brazilian telenovela of the same name on Rede Manchete, released in July 1987 by RCA Victor, under the Bloch Produções label (a Grupo Bloch company) on LP and cassette. The album consists of national songs performed by Brazilian artists from MPB, pop and rock, who performed in various scenes of the telenovela, highlighting central themes of crime, violence, passion, humor, and elements of the paranormal, serving as a backdrop for the moments of tension and emotion experienced by the characters in the plot.

=== Track listing ===
Side A
No.	Title	Writer(s)	Artist(s)	Length
1.	"Amor Explícito" (Simone and Téo's theme)	Nico Rezende; Paulinho Lima; Antonio Cicero	Simone	3:46
2.	"Um Lugar do Mundo" (Opening theme)	Ricardo Feghali; Nando	Roupa Nova	3:48
3.	"Mensagem de Amor"	Hebert Vianna	Leo Jaime	4:28
4.	"Condição" (Bárbara's theme)	Lulu Santos	Lulu Santos	4:21
5.	"Se Eu Soubesse"	William Magalhães; Duda Cavalcante	Tim Maia	4:59
6.	"Lua do Leblon"	Lisieux Costa; Fausto Nilo	Fagner	4:45

Side B
No.	Title	Writer(s)	Artist(s)	Length
7.	"Um Sonho a Dois" (Lucinha's theme)	Michael Sullivan; Paulo Massadas	Joanna	5:15
8.	"Segurança"	Humberto Gessinger	Engenheiros do Hawaii	3:18
9.	"Família"	Arnaldo Antunes; Toni Belloto	Titãs	3:32
10.	"Coração pra Coração" (Wanda's theme)	Augusto Cesar; Claudio Rabello	The Fevers	2:50
11.	"Si Si, No No" (Ulisses and Adriana's theme)	João Bosco	João Bosco	5:45
12.	"Passos no Porão"	Wander Taffo; Lee Marcucci; Mauricio Gasperin	Rádio Táxi	4:14

=== Corpo Santo – Trilha Sonora Original Internacional ===
Corpo Santo – Trilha Sonora Original Internacional

Soundtrack album by Various artists
- Released: August 1987
- Genres: Pop; R&B; rock; instrumental
- Length: 49:28
- Language: English
- Label: RCA Ariola · Bloch Produções

Corpo Santo chronology
Corpo Santo – Trilha Sonora Original (1987)	Corpo Santo – Trilha Sonora Original Internacional (1987)

Corpo Santo – Trilha Sonora Original Internacional is the second soundtrack for the Brazilian telenovela of the same name on Rede Manchete, released in August 1987 by the record label RCA Ariola under the Bloch Produções label (a Grupo Bloch company) on LP and cassette. The soundtrack is composed of international songs in several languages, the majority in English. Of the 12 tracks on the album, eleven are songs sung in English and one is an instrumental track at the end of the soundtrack. The songs were selected to be played in various scenes of the telenovela, punctuating the moments of romance, mystery, glamour, emotional tension, and supernatural events that permeated the plot, and also served as iconic themes for the telenovela's characters.

=== Track listing ===
Side A
No.	Title	Writer(s)	Artist(s)	Length
1.	"Someday"	Glass Tiger; Jim Vallance	Glass Tiger	3:46
2.	"If I Could Hold On To Love" (Téo e Bárbara's theme)	Randy Goodrum; Steve Lukather	Kenny Rogers	4:13
3.	"You Touched My Life"	Gwen Guthrie	Gwen Guthrie	4:28
4.	"(I Just) Died in Your Arms"	Nick Van Eede	Cutting Crew	3:52
5.	"Get Your Love Right"	Winston Sela	Sabiha Kara	4:03
6.	"I Can't Help Falling In Love With You"	Creatore; Peretti; Weiss	Corey Hart	4:45

Side B
No.	Title	Writer(s)	Artist(s)	Length
7.	"Standing On Higher Ground" (Téo's theme)	Eric Woolfson; Alan Parsons	The Alan Parsons Project	5:01
8.	"I Got The Feeling (It's Over)"	Gregory Abbott	Gregory Abbott	4:04
9.	"How Many Lies?" (Mara's theme)	G. Kemp	Spandau Ballet	5:15
10.	"Easy"	Ponte; Inês; Oliveira; Hinchey	Dora	4:12
11.	"The Future's So Bright (I Gotta Wear Shades)"	Pat Mac Donald	Timbuk 3	3:22
12.	"Late Evening" (Instrumental)	Bernard Arcadio; Joel Fajerman	Bernard Arcadio	3:21

== Audience ==
The first episode of Corpo Santo, aired at 9:20 p.m. on a Monday, garnered double-digit ratings for Rede Manchete. The telenovela averaged a 14% share, surpassing the performance of its predecessor, Mania de Querer, which had registered a 9.5% audience share the previous week. At the same time, TV Globo reached 63.5%, and Band, 2%, according to IBOPE data.

By July 26, 1987, the network already considered Corpo Santo a solid success, with the series reaching between 20% and 25% of the audience in Rio de Janeiro. Manchete's general director, Rubens Furtado, stated that the network needed a national average of 15% to ensure its self-sustainability. However, the ratings achieved in the Rio de Janeiro market already indicated commercial viability. The telenovela also benefited from the previous success of Dona Beija, whose rerun helped maintain its audience and boost Manchete's revenue in the time slot. In September 1987, Corpo Santo reached 28 points in IBOPE.

One of the most impactful moments of the plot was the showing of the scene of Simone's murder (Christiane Torloni), which generated 31 rating points in Rio de Janeiro, marking the peak audience of the production.

== Awards and nominations ==
Year	Award	Category	Indicated	Result	Ref.
1987	APCA Award	Best Soap Opera	Corpo Santo	Won	
1987	APCA Award	Best Actress	Christiane Torloni	Nominated	
1987	APCA Award	Best Actor	Reginaldo Faria	Nominated	
1987	APCA Award	Best Supporting Actress	Ângela Vieira	Won	
1987	APCA Award	Best Supporting Actor	Sérgio Viotti	Won	
1987	APCA Award	Best Screenwriter	José Louzeiro	Won	
1987	APCA Award	Male revelation	Chico Diaz	Won	
