= Paulo Stein =

Brazilian journalist (1947–2021)

- Born: October 6, 1947; Rio de Janeiro, Brazil
- Died: March 27, 2021 (aged 73); Rio de Janeiro, Brazil
- Occupations: Journalist broadcaster columnist

Paulo Stein (October 6, 1947 – March 27, 2021) was a Brazilian journalist, broadcaster, television presenter and sports announcer.

== Biography ==
Paulo Stein started working at Jornal dos Sports in 1968, where he stayed until 1969. He was a reporter and editor of the O Estado de São Paulo from 1969 to 1978. Stein worked at Tupi from 1971 to 1976 and at Nacional Radio from 1976 to 1981. He was a columnist for the newspaper O Fluminense between 1978 and 1981. On television, Stein was a narrator, sports director and presenter of the program Bola na Mesa on TV Bandeirantes Rio de Janeiro from 1977 to 1982. In 1983, he went to Rede Manchete where he was a sports director and, in addition to sports coverage, he was also consecrated in the carnival broadcasts, which he narrated from 1984 to 1998, being the first announcer who broadcast from the Sambódromo Carioca and also from Manaus. Stein narrated the carnival of São Paulo for several years and that of Salvador, in 1993. In 1996, Stein went to RecordTV, but returned in 1997 to Manchete, where he also participated in the coverage of the 1998 World Cup. Paulo Stein was in Manchete until 1999, when it was made available in November of that year by RedeTV!, which bought the broadcaster of the Bloch group in May. In addition, he wrote for the magazines Manchete, Fatos & Fotos, Manchete Esportiva and Placar. He was also a professor of television news and radio. He taught at Faculdade Pinheiro Guimarães from 1993 to 1996. He was editor in chief between 2000 and 2001 at the MeDeiBem website. In 2001, he joined the TVE Brasil team where he presented EsporTVisão. Between 2008 and 2010, he joined the ESPN Brasil team acting as a presenter for the Bate-Bola 2ª Edition program, at the station's Rio de Janeiro headquarters. In 2011, Stein joined the SporTV and Premiere team, which he left in 2019, never returning to the video.

In 2009, after 11 years out of the Rio Carnival broadcasts, he commanded the transmission of the parade to the Liga de Escolas de Samba of Grupo de Acesso, on CNT. Stein died on March 27, 2021, after being hospitalized for four days due to complications from COVID-19 during the COVID-19 pandemic in Brazil. He was 73.
