= Fatos & Fotos =

- Editor: Editora Bloch
- Frequency: Weekly
- Founder: Adolpho Bloch
- First issue: 1960s
- Country: Brazil
- Language: Portuguese

Fatos & Fotos (also called in some periods Fatos & Fotos/Gente) was a Brazilian weekly variety magazine published by Editora Bloch, part of Grupo Bloch, based out of Rio de Janeiro. It was in circulation between the 1960s and 1980s. In 1983, it stopped being a weekly magazine and further editions began to be released sporadically.

== Characteristics ==
The magazine was directed to report with large photos and little text, covering topics such as social dramas, news updates, art, the personal life of famous people and the world of television.

Such articles were published in sections that had names based on the themes they covered and were distributed over 76 pages. With an innovative diagramming, the images stopped being an accessory element of material journalism, and began to take on a key role in how the material developed.

== History ==
Fatos & Fotos, together with Manchete, which was published by the same publisher, were responsible for the decline of O Cruzeiro, the then leading publication for this type of magazine in Brazil until the 1960s.

In Fatos & Fotos' specific case, it was created to take advantage of the rest of the vast photographic material that had been produced for Manchete that they had in excess. However, with their success in reaching the public, it came to be the 4th most read magazine at the time, receiving an elevated amount of circulation.

Edy Star was the first Brazilian artist to reveal that he was gay in an interview to Fatos & Fotos in 1973. Fatos & Fotos included, between their 801st (December 1976) and 843rd (17 October 1977) editions, interviews done by writer Clarice Lispector, with this being her last publication before her death.

The magazine closed their operations due to lack of interest from readers and the consequent crisis at Editora Bloch.
