= Sérgio Viotti =

Brazilian actor and director (1927–2009)

- Born: March 14, 1927; São Paulo, Brazil
- Died: July 26, 2009 (aged 82); São Paulo, Brazil
- Occupations: Actor; television director
- Years active: 1987–1997

Sérgio Luiz Viotti (14 March 1927 – 26 July 2009) was a Brazilian actor and television director.

== Biography ==
Viotti was born in São Paulo. He resided in London, England between 1949 and 1958, where he worked for BBC Radio. He worked as a radio broadcaster and a dance and opera critic while at the BBC.

Viotti returned to Brazil in 1958. In 1958, he was asked by Antunes Filho to direct, Viagem a Três, by Jean de Létraz, which marked his entry into directing. His career as an actor first began in 1961, when he appeared in the theater production of The Connection O Contato by American playwright Jack Gelber. His work on O Cantanto earned Viotti a best new actor award from the Prêmio Associação Brasileira de Críticos Teatrais (Brazilian Theater Critics Association). He also received acclaim for his work in the 1967 production of Queridinho by Charles Dyer.

In 1991, Viotti celebrated his then 30-year-long professional acting career by appearing in As idades do homem, compilation of William Shakespeare plays directed by Dorival Carper, who was also his life partner for 47 years until his death.

Viotti also worked on television in the telenovelas Terra Nostra, Meu Bem Meu Mal, Sinhá Moça and Xica da Silva.

His most recent work was as the character Manuel in the telenovela Duas Caras in 2007.

== Death ==
Viotti was hospitalized on April 19, 2009, and remained in the hospital for the remainder of his life. He died from cardiac arrest at the Hospital Samaritano in São Paulo on July 26, 2009, at the age of 82. The actor was cremated at the Vila Alpina cemetery, which is located east of São Paulo.

== Filmography ==
=== Film credits ===
- 1965: Um Ramo Para Luísa
- 1965: 22-2000 Cidade Aberta
- 1986: Angel Malo
- 1995: Sábado - Narrator

=== Television credits ===
- 1980: Dulcinéa Vai à Guerra (Rede Bandeirantes)
- 1986: Sinhá Moça - Frei José
- 1987: Corpo Santo (Rede Manchete) - Grego (Nicolas)
- 1988: O Primo Basílio - Conselheiro Acácio
- 1988: Olho por Olho - Eliseu (Rede Manchete)
- 1989: Kananga do Japão (Rede Manchete) - Saul
- 1990: Meu Bem, Meu Mal - Toledo
- 1990: Mico Preto - Plínio
- 1992: Despedida de Solteiro - Gabriel Chadade
- 1993: Olho no Olho - Jorginho
- 1995: História de Amor - Gregório Furtado
- 1995: Irmãos Coragem - Rafael Bastos
- 1996: Xica da Silva (Rede Manchete) - Conde da Barca
- 1997: Anjo Mau - Américo Abreu
- 1997: Por Amor e Ódio (Rede Record) - Frederico Saragoça
- 1999: Suave Veneno - Alceste
- 1999: Terra Nostra - Ivan Maurício
- 2001: Os Maias - Pai Vasques
- 2003: A Casa das Sete Mulheres - Padre Cordeiro
- 2004: Um Só Coração - Samuel
- 2006: JK - Adolpho Bloch
- 2007: Duas Caras - Manuel de Andrade (final appearance)
