= Paulo Betti =

Brazilian actor (1952-)

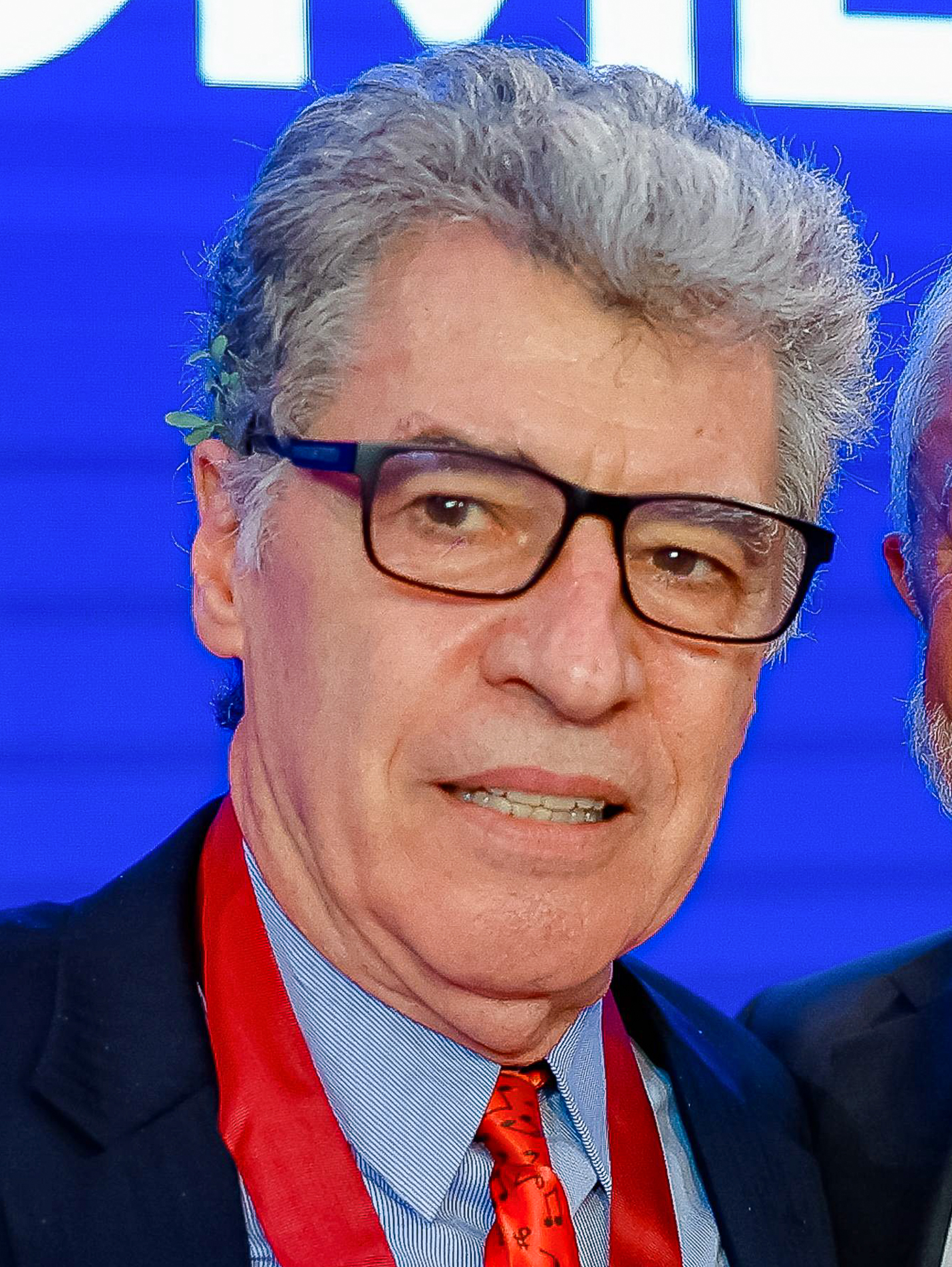
- Betti in 2025
- Born: Paulo Sérgio Betti; 8 September 1952 (age 74); Capivari (now Rafard), São Paulo, Brazil
- Occupations: Actor; playwright; director
- Years active: 1979–present
- Spouses: Eliane Giardini (m. 1973; div. 1997) Maria Ribeiro (m. 2001; div. 2005) Dadá Coelho (m. 2015)
- Children: 3

Paulo Sérgio Betti (born 8 September 1952) is a Brazilian actor, playwright, and stage director. He also works occasionally as film producer and director.

== Biography ==
Paulo Sérgio Betti was born on 8 September 1952 in Rafard, a small town in the state of São Paulo. In over thirty years of career, Betti has acted in over 20 telenovelas and in 21 feature films. His most notable role was as the revolutionary Captain Carlos Lamarca in Lamarca (1994) and Zuzu Angel (2006), both directed by Sérgio Rezende. For his role in Lamarca, he won the São Paulo Association of Art Critics Award for Best Film Actor in 1995. He also hosted the show Novos Nomes em Cena of Canal Brasil, where he interviewed young Brazilian actors.

Betti was married to actress Eliane Giardini between 1973 and 1997. The couple had two daughters: Juliana (born in 1977) and Mariana (born in 1980). He was also married to actress Maria Ribeiro, mother of his only son João (born on 30 March 2003). The couple separated in 2005.

== Political views ==
In 1989 Betti was one of the producers of the music video for the famous jingle "Lula Lá" ("Lula There") for the presidential candidate Luiz Inácio Lula da Silva from the Workers' Party. In this video, several famous artists of the time sing the jingle. Betti supported Lula throughout all of his presidential campaigns, including the one in 2006, when several artists withdrawn their support from the candidate because of his party's involvement in the scandal known as "mensalão".

On 1 October 2020 Betti stated that he wishes the death of all elderly people that walk in the streets without face masks, and lamented that President Jair Bolsonaro did not die when he was stabbed in 2018.

== Filmography ==
Paulo Betti in a play at SESC Campinas in 2026.

=== As director ===
- 2017 - A Fera na Selva
- 2003 - Cafundó

=== As actor ===
- 2025 - Três Graças as Téo Pereira
- 2023 - Amor Perfeito as Anselmo Evaristo
- 2023 - The Masked Singer Brasil (season 3), cosplayed as coelho
- 2022 - Além da Ilusão as Constantino Andrade / Valentino Estrella
- 2019 - Órfãos da Terra as Miguel Nasser
- 2018 - O Sétimo Guardião as Ypiranga Pitiguary
- 2017 - O Outro Lado do Paraíso as Maurício
- 2016 - Rock Story as Haroldo
- 2016 - Chatô, o Rei do Brasil as Getúlio Vargas
- 2014 - Império as Téo Pereira
- 2013 - Casa da Mãe Joana 2 as Paulo Roberto
- 2013 - Anita e Garibaldi as Luigi Rossetti (voice)
- 2012 - Lado a Lado as Mário Cavalcanti
- 2011 - A Vida da Gente as Jonas Macedo
- 2008 - Casa da Mãe Joana as Paulo Roberto
- 2007 - Sete Pecados as Flávio
- 2007 - O Signo da Cidade as Teca's husband
- 2007 - A Grande Família - O Filme as Carlinhos
- 2007 - Paraíso Tropical as Lucena
- 2006 - JK as José Maria Alkmin
- 2006 - Zuzu Angel as Cap. Carlos Lamarca
- 2006 - Tapete vermelho as Aparício
- 2006 - Irma Vap - O Retorno
- 2005 - Cafundó (also director) as Parrot man
- 2003 - Kubanacan as Chacon
- 2002 - Desejos de Mulher as Alex Miller
- 2001 - O Clone as Armando
- 2001 - Onde andará Petrúcio Felker (voice) (short subject)
- 2000 - Os idiotas mesmo (voice) (short subject)
- 2000 - Um Anjo Trapalhão
- 1999 - Força de um Desejo as Higino Ventura
- 1999 - Chiquinha Gonzaga as Antônio Carlos Gomes
- 1999 - Oriundi as Renato Padovani
- 1999 - Mauá - O Imperador e o Rei as Irineu Evangelista de Sousa, Viscount of Mauá
- 1999 - O toque do oboé as Augusto
- 1997 - A Indomada as Ypiranga Pitiguary
- 1997 - O Amor Está no Ar as Bigode (Mustache)
- 1997 - Ed Mort as Ed Mort
- 1997 - Guerra de Canudos as Zé Lucena
- 1996 - O Fim do Mundo as Joãozinho da Dagmar
- 1996 - Quem Matou Pixote? as TV director
- 1995 - A Próxima Vítima as Olavo
- 1995 - Biu, a vida real não tem retake (short subject)
- 1994 - Lamarca as Cap. Carlos Lamarca
- 1993 - Mulheres de Areia as Wanderley Amaral
- 1992 - Pedra sobre Pedra as Carlão Batista
- 1991 - Olha! Isso pode dar bolo (short subject)
- 1990 - Césio 137 - o Pesadelo de Goiânia
- 1989 - Tieta as Timóteo
- 1989 - Doida Demais as Gabriel
- 1988 - Dedé Mamata as Dedé's father
- 1987 - Besame Mucho as César
- 1985 - Fonte da Saudade
- 1985 - Jogo Duro
- 1984 - Vereda Tropical as Marco
