= Casa da Mãe Joana 2 =

2013 film directed by Hugo Carvana

- Theatrical release poster
- Directed by: Hugo Carvana
- Written by: Paulo Halm
- Starring: José Wilker; Paulo Betti; Antonio Pedro
- Cinematography: Lauro Escorel
- Edited by: Diana Vasconcellos
- Music by: David Tygel
- Production company: MAC Produções
- Distributed by: Imagem Filmes
- Release date: 6 September 2013
- Running time: 82 minutes
- Country: Brazil
- Language: Portuguese

Casa da Mãe Joana 2 is a 2013 Brazilian comedy film directed by Hugo Carvana. The film was released in Brazil on September 6, 2013. It is a sequel of the 2008 film Casa da Mãe Joana.

== Cast ==
- José Wilker as Juca
- Paulo Betti as PR
- Antônio Pedro as Montanha
- Betty Faria as Dona Araci
- Juliana Paes as Dolores Sol

== Critical response ==
One critic wrote on Omelete that the film could be seen as the last of a trilogy by the director, after the 1991 sequel of Vai Trabalhar, Vagabundo!, about the malandro carioca, but being, in itself, a joke at the expense of the Brazilian audience, due to its illogical plot.
