= O Cruzeiro =

Brazilian magazine

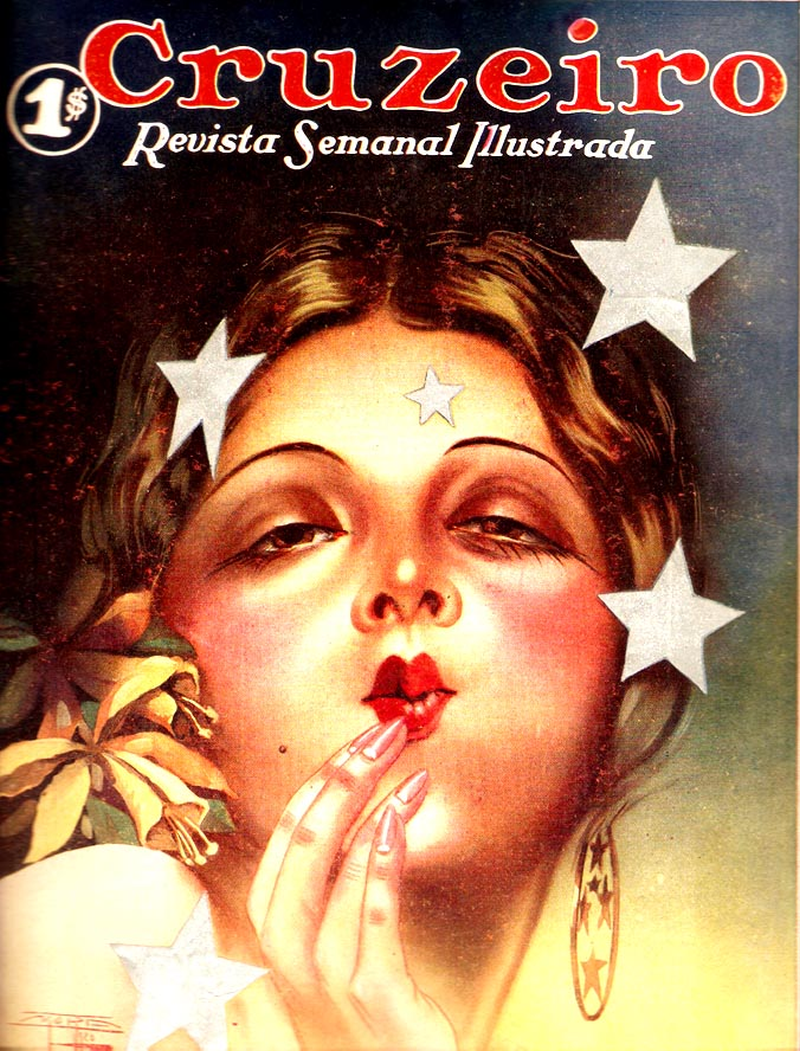
- Cover of O Cruzeiro's first issue (1928)
- Editor: Alexandre von Baumgarten
- Former editors: Carlos Malheiro Dias; Accioly Neto; José Amádio
- Categories: News magazine
- Frequency: weekly
- Publisher: Diários Associados
- Founder: Assis Chateaubriand
- Founded: 1928
- First issue: 10 November 1928; 97 years ago
- Final issue: July 1975
- Country: Brazil
- Based in: Rio de Janeiro
- Language: Portuguese

O Cruzeiro (initially just Cruzeiro) was a Brazilian illustrated weekly magazine, published in Rio de Janeiro from 1928 until 1985, with the exception of the period from August 1975 to June 1977.

== History and profile ==
The publication, subtitled Revista Semanal Illustrada, was originally named just Cruzeiro, after the constellation of the Southern Cross (Cruzeiro do Sul). The first edition was released with 70 pages on 10 November 1928, and was published by Empresa Grafico Cruzeiro S.A. of Dr. José Mariano Filho in 152 Rua Buenos Aires. In June 1929, by issue number 30, the magazine changed its name to O Cruzeiro. It was owned by the media conglomerate Diários Associados owned by Assis Chateaubriand. The director was Carlos Malheiro Dias until 1933, succeeded by Antonio Accioly Netto.

O Cruzeiro was leading Brazilian illustrated magazine in the first half of the 20th century. Since its inception it established a new language in the Brazilian press: graphic innovations, publishing great articles, with emphasis on photojournalism. It strengthened the partnership with reporter-photographer duos, the most famous being formed by David Nasser and Jean Manzon who in the 1940s and 1950s, produced stories of great impact. The magazine made it clear in its first editorial that it differed from its "older sisters who were born from the debris of Colonial Rio", putting itself at the forefront of modernity combining its name to modern technology: "O Cruzeiro will find in its birth the skyscraper, the radio, and the air mail ".

In 1941, O Cruzeiro also became the name of the publishing house of the Diários Associados group.

Among its many subjects, the magazine O Cruzeiro told facts about the lives of stars, cinema, sports and health. It also had sections of cartoons, politics, cooking and fashion.

Covering the suicide of Getúlio Vargas in August 1954, the magazine circulation reached 720,000 copies. Until then, the maximum reached was the mark of 80,000 copies. Thereafter, the number remained. In the 1960s, O Cruzeiro declined. This was also caused by the emergence of new publications such as Manchete and Fatos & Fotos. The end of the empire of Chateaubriand's Diários Associados caused a hiatus between mid 1975, and September 1977, when o Cruzeiro returned under the leadership of Joaquim José Freire Lagreca.

== Collaborators ==
Some of the most notable collaborators to the magazine were:

- Carlos Estêvão
- David Nasser
- Gustavo Barroso
- Jean Manzon
- José Araújo de Medeiros
- José Cândido de Carvalho
- J. Carlos
- José Leal
- Luciano Carneiro
- Mário de Morais
- Millôr Fernandes
- Péricles
- Rachel de Queiroz
- Ubiratan de Lemos
- Ziraldo
