= José Wilker =

Brazilian actor and director (1944–2014)

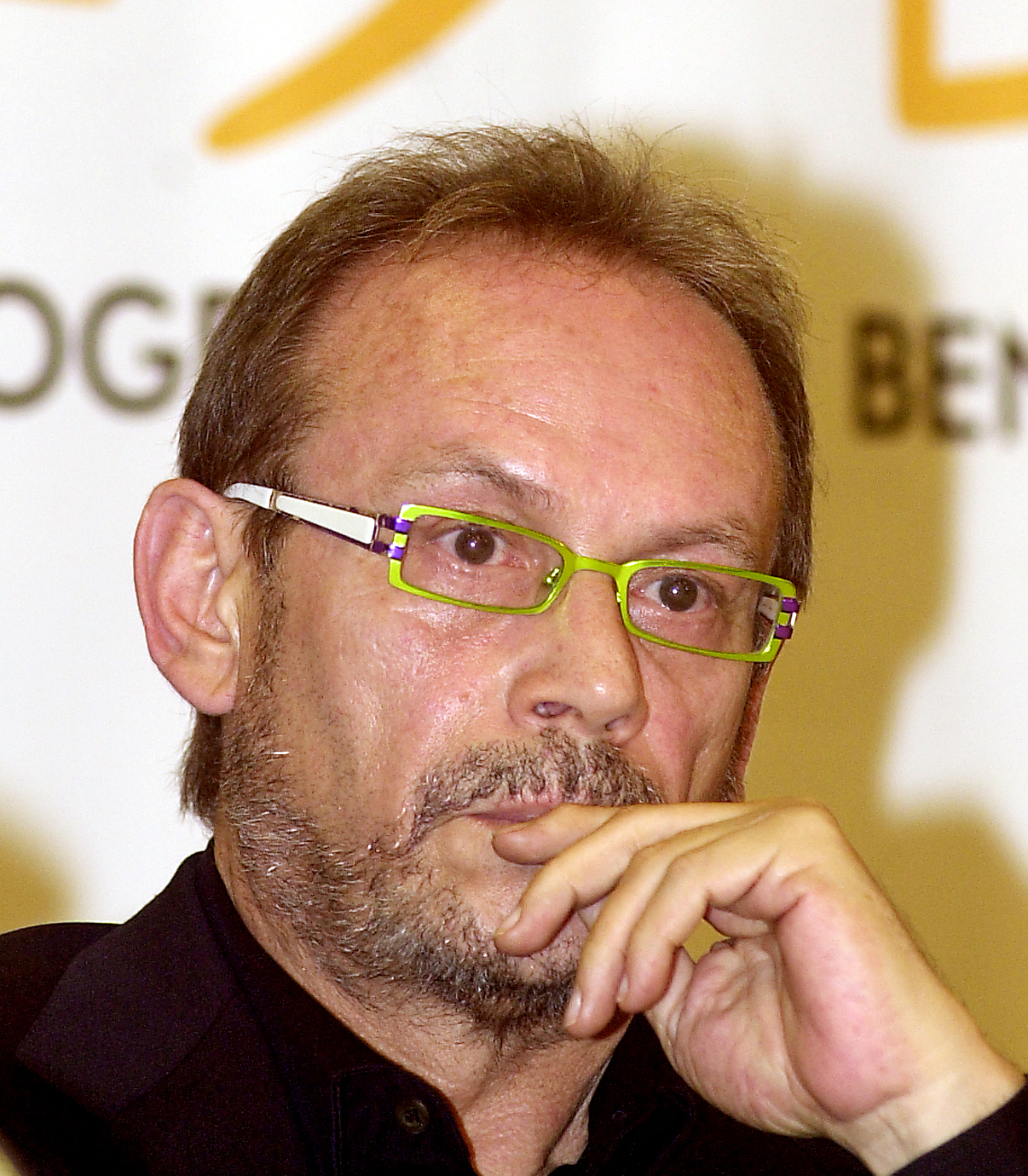
- Wilker in 2006
- Born: José Wilker Almeida; 20 August 1944; Juazeiro do Norte, Ceará, Brazil
- Died: 5 April 2014 (aged 69); Rio de Janeiro, Brazil
- Occupations: Actor, director
- Years active: 1965–2014
- Spouses: Elza Rocha Pinto (m. 1964; sep. 1976) Renée de Vielmond (m. 1976; div. 1985) Mônica Torres (m. 1986; div. 1996) Guilhermina Guinle (m. 1999; div. 2006)
- Children: 2

José Wilker Almeida (20 August 1944 – 5 April 2014) was a Brazilian film, stage, and television actor and director. He gained fame in telenovelas such as Roque Santeiro (1985), but became internationally known for his role as Vadinho, the husband who returns from the dead to tempt Sônia Braga's character in the film Dona Flor and Her Two Husbands (1976).

== Career ==
Wilker was born on 20 August 1944, in Juazeiro do Norte. He started his career as a radio announcer at a radio in Ceará, where he was born. He moved to Recife and worked in the theater as a member of Movimento de Cultura Popular (MPC). The group brought culture and lessons in reading, writing, and politics. MPC was banned during the military repression in the 1960s, and Wilker moved to Rio de Janeiro.

He began working in cinema in Rio, which was at the forefront of Brazilian experimental and national cinema. He was 19 when he appeared in his first film, in 1965 (A Falecida), starring Fernanda Montenegro. In Rio, Wilker also got involved with the Teatro Ipanema theater group, headed by Rubens Corrêa and Ivan de Albuquerque. At Teatro Ipanema he rose to underground fame with his role in Fernando Arrabal's O Arquiteto e o Imperador da Assíria (The Architect and the Emperor of Assyria) (1970), and starred in his own A China é Azul (China is Blue) (1972). He worked in television soap operas for decades.

He debuted in 1971 on the popular show Bandeira 2 (Flag 2) written by Dias Gomes and televised on the Rede Globo network. Wilker gained acclaim for his role as the protagonist in the soap opera Roque Santeiro, starring with Regina Duarte and Lima Duarte. Between 1997 and 2002, he directed many episodes of Sai De Baixo. In 1979, he was cast in the movie Bye Bye Brazil and in 1986 in The Man in the Black Cape. Among his most memorable roles in movies was Tiradentes in the film The Conspirators of 1972, Vadinho – which broke box office records in theaters – in Dona Flor and Her Two Husbands in 1976, as the politician Tenorio Cavalcanti in The Man in Black Cover of 1986 and Anthony Advisor of War Canudos of 1997. In miniseries JK, he played an older Juscelino Kubitschek during his time as President of the Republic. In 1992 he worked in Medicine Man along with Sean Connery and Lorraine Bracco.

== Death ==
José Wilker died on 5 April 2014, of a heart attack in Rio de Janeiro, aged 69.

== Filmography ==
=== Film ===
- A Falecida (1965)
- El justicero (1967) .... El Rato
- A Vida Provisória (1968)
- Estranho Triângulo (1970) .... Valter
- Os Inconfidentes (1971) .... Tiradentes
- Amor e Medo (1974) .... The filmmaker
- O Casal (1975) .... Alfredo Giacometti
- Deliciosas Traições de Amor (1974) .... (segment "Dois é Bom... Quatro é Melhor")
- Ana, a Libertina (1975)
- Dona Flor and Her Two Husbands (1976) .... Valdomiro 'Vadinho' Santos Guimarães
- Xica da Silva (1976) .... The Count of Valadares
- Confissões de uma Viúva Moça (1976) .... Emílio
- Diamante Bruto (1977) .... José de Castro
- Batalha dos Guararapes (1978) .... João Fernandes
- Professor Kranz tedesco di Germania (1978) .... Leleco
- O Bom Burguês (1979) .... Lucas
- Bye Bye Brazil (1979) .... Lorde Cigano
- The Man in the Black Cape (1980) .... Tenório Cavalcanti
- Bonitinha, mas Ordinária (1981) .... Edgard
- Los crápulas (1981)
- Fiebre amarilla (1983)
- O Rei da Vela (1981) .... Abelardo Segundo
- Fonte da Saudade (1985)
- Baixo Gávea (1986) .... Maluco da bomba
- Subway to the Stars (1987) .... Teacher
- Besame Mucho (1987) .... Xico
- Leila Diniz (1987)
- Prisioneiro do Rio (1988) .... Salo
- Solidão, uma História de Amor (1989)
- Dias Melhores Virão (1989) .... Wallace Caldeira
- Doida Demais (1989) .... Noé
- Filha da Mãe (1990) .... Álvaro
- Medicine Man (1992) .... Dr. Miguel Ornega
- Pequeno Dicionário Amoroso (1997) .... Alaor
- For All – O Trampolim da Vitória (1997) .... Giancarlo
- Guerra de Canudos (1997) .... Antônio Conselheiro
- Villa-Lobos: A Life of Passion (2000) .... Donizetti
- Dead in the Water (Brazilian: O mar por testemunha, 2002) .... Father
- The Man of the Year (2003) .... Sílvio
- Viva Sapato! (2003) .... Fernando
- Maria – Mãe do Filho de Deus (2003) .... Pilatos
- Onde Anda Você (2004) .... Mandarim
- Redeemer (2004) .... Dr. Sabóia
- The Hitchhiker's Guide to the Galaxy (2005) (Brazilian dub)
- The Greatest Love of All (2006) .... Antônio
- Canta Maria (2006) .... Lampião
- Sexo com Amor? (2008) .... Jorge
- Casa da Mãe Joana (2008) .... Juca
- Romance (2008) .... Danilo
- Embarque Imediato (2009) .... Fulano
- O Bem Amado (2010) .... Zeca Diabo
- Elvis e Madona (2010) .... Pachecão
- O Sonho de Inacim (2010) .... Padre Rolim
- A Hora e a Vez de Augusto Matraga (2011) .... Joãozinho Bem-Bem
- Tancredo, a Travessia (2011; documentary) .... Narrator
- Mundo Invisível (2012) .... (segment "Kreoko")
- Giovanni Improtta (2012) .... Giovanni Improtta
- Casa da Mãe Joana 2 (2013) .... Juca
- Isolados (2014) .... Dr. Fausto
- O Duelo (2015) .... Chico Pacheco

=== Television ===
- 1971: Bandeira 2 .... Zelito
- 1971: O Crime do Silêncio
- 1971: Dibuck o Demônio
- 1972: O Bofe .... Bandeira
- 1973: Cavalo de Aço .... Atílio
- 1973: Os Ossos do Barão .... Martinho Ghirotto
- 1974: Corrida do Ouro .... Fábio
- 1974: A Cartomante Personagem Desconhecido
- 1974: Enquanto a Cegonha Não Vem Personagem Desconhecido
- 1975: Gabriela .... Mundinho Falcão
- 1976: Anjo Mau .... Rodrigo
- 1980: Plumas e Paetês .... Renato / Paulo
- 1981: Brilhante .... Oswaldo / Sidney
- 1982: Final Feliz .... Rodrigo
- 1982: Paraíso .... Faustinho
- 1983: Bandidos da Falange (TV Mini-Series) .... Tito Lívio
- 1984: Transas e Caretas .... Tiago
- 1985: Roque Santeiro .... Luis Roque Duarte, o Roque Santeiro
- 1985: Um Sonho a Mais .... Editor do Jornal do Amanhã
- 1987: Carmem .... Camilo
- 1987: Corpo Santo .... Ulisses Queiroz
- 1989: O Salvador da Pátria .... João Matos
- 1990: Mico Preto .... Frederico
- 1992: Anos Rebeldes (TV Mini-Series) .... Fábio Andrade Brito
- 1993: Agosto (TV Mini-Series) .... Pedro Lomagno
- 1993: Fera Ferida .... Demóstenes Maçaranduba da Costa
- 1993: Renascer .... Belarmino (First phase)
- 1995: A Próxima Vítima .... Marcelo Rossi
- 1996: Anjo de Mim .... Bianor
- 1996: A Vida como Ela É .... Narrador Personagem Desconhecido
- 1996: O Fim do Mundo .... Tião Socó
- 1996: Salsa e Merengue .... Urbano
- 1997: Sai de Baixo .... Beto (Participação Especial)
- 1999: Suave Veneno .... Waldomiro Cerqueira
- 2000: A Muralha (TV Mini-Series) .... Dom Diego
- 2001: Um Anjo Caiu do Céu .... Tarso
- 2002: Sai de Baixo ... Ele mesmo – voz (participação especial)
- 2002: Desejos de Mulher .... Ariel Britz
- 2002: O Quinto dos Infernos (TV Mini-Series) .... Marquês de Marialva (adulto)
- 2004: Senhora do Destino .... Giovanni Improtta
- 2006: JK (TV Mini-Series) .... Juscelino Kubitschek
- 2007: Amazônia, de Galvez a Chico Mendes (TV Mini-Series) .... Luis Gálvez Rodríguez de Arias
- 2007: Duas Caras .... Francisco Macieira
- 2008: Três Irmãs .... Augusto Pinheiro / Lázaro
- 2009: Cinquentinha (TV Mini-Series) ..... Daniel Lopes de Carvalho
- 2010: Na Forma da Lei ..... Dr. Mourão
- 2011: O Bem Amado ..... Zeca Diabo
- 2011: Insensato Coração .... Humberto Brandão
- 2011: A Mulher Invisível .... Reinaldo Fachetti
- 2012: O Brado Retumbante .... Floriano Pedreira
- 2012: Gabriela .... Coronel Jesuíno Mendonça
- 2013: Amor à Vida .... Herbert Marques

=== Director ===
- 1983: Louco Amor
- 1984: Transas e Caretas
- 1987: Corpo Santo
- 1987: Carmem (telenovela)
- 1997-2002: Sai de Baixo
