= O Sorriso do Lagarto =

- Genre: Drama, horror.
- Created by: Wálter Negrão; Geraldo Carneiro
- Based on: O Sorriso do Lagarto by João Ubaldo Ribeiro
- Directed by: Roberto Talma
- Starring: Tony Ramos; Raul Cortez; Maitê Proença; Carlos Augusto Strazzer; José Lewgoy; Lúcia Veríssimo; Alexandre Frota
- Theme music composer: Peter Gabriel
- Opening theme: "Mercy Street"
- Country of origin: Brazil
- Original language: Portuguese
- No. of episodes: 52

Original release
- Network: Rede Globo
- Release: 4 June – 30 August 1991

O Sorriso do Lagarto (The Lizard's Smile) is a Brazilian television series that first aired on Rede Globo in 1991.

== Cast ==
- Tony Ramos - João Pedroso
- Raul Cortez - Angelo Marcos
- Maitê Proença - Ana Clara
- Carlos Augusto Strazzer - Peçanha
- José Lewgoy - Lúcio Nemésio
- Lúcia Veríssimo - Bebel
- Alexandre Frota - Tavinho
- Claudio Mamberti - Cirino
- Ana Paula Bouzas - Branca
- Marcelo Picchi - Nando
- Ana Beatriz Nogueira - Evangelina
- Daniel Herz- Joaquim
- Sofia Papo - Maria das Mercês
- Pedro Paulo Rangel - Padre Monteirinho
- Fábio Sabag - Bará
- Chiquinho Brandão - Chico
