= Cafundó (film) =

2005 film directed by Paulo Betti

- Theatrical release poster
- Directed by: Paulo Betti; Clóvis Bueno
- Written by: Clóvis Bueno
- Produced by: Paulo Betti; Virginia W. Moraes; R.A. Gennaro
- Starring: Lázaro Ramos; Leona Cavalli; Leandro Firmino da Hora; Beto Guiz; Ernani Moraes
- Cinematography: José Roberto Eliezer
- Edited by: Sérgio Mekler
- Music by: André Abujamra
- Production company: Prole de Adão
- Distributed by: Laz Audiovisual
- Release date: 29 September 2005
- Running time: 102 minutes
- Country: Brazil
- Language: Portuguese
- Box office: R$185,707

Cafundó is 2005 Brazilian historical drama film written and directed by Paulo Betti and Clóvis Bueno and starring Lázaro Ramos. The film is a biopic based on miracle worker preto velho João de Camargo of Sorocaba and is based on the book João de Camargo de Sorocaba: O Nascimento de uma Religião by Carlos de Campos and Adolfo Frioli. The title comes from a former quilombo, the source of João de Camargo's original spiritual inspiration, located in today's Salto de Pirapora.

== Plot ==
São Paulo state, 1890s. João is a former slave and the son of an Orisha priestess and works as a mule herd for a coronel. One day, he and his close friend Cirino decide to leave the farm. João takes his mother to Cafundó, the bastion of Afro-American religion in the vicinity. However, João leaves the community and takes errands to work in menial jobs. He meets a possessed white prostitute named Rosário and falls in love. Only after an unhappy marriage with Rosário and his mother's demise, João has a series of visions and decides to work as a spiritual leader for Sorocaba. In 1906, he builds a church with help from Cirino and begins to preach his syncretic faith, which is a blend of Orisha worship, veneration of Catholic saints, and eventually Kardecist spiritism.

== Cast ==
- Lázaro Ramos as João de Camargo
- Leona Cavalli as Rosário
- Leandro Firmino da Hora as Cirino
- Alexandre Rodrigues as Natalino
- Ernani Moraes as Coronel João Justino
- Luís Melo as Monsignor João Soares
- Renato Consorte as Minister
- Francisco Cuoco as Bishop
- Abrahão Farc as Judge

== Production ==
To reconstruct the atmosphere of the 19th century, the natural scenery of Ponta Grossa and historic buildings of Lapa, Paranaguá and Antonina were chosen as filming locations.

== Reception ==
The film won five gold Kikitos at the Gramado Film Festival, in the categories of best actor (Lázaro Ramos), best art direction, best cinematography and the special jury prize. It was also awarded as best film and best cinematography, at ParatyCine.

== See also ==
- Slavery in Brazil
- Umbanda
