= Tolerance (film) =

2000 film directed by Carlos Gerbase

- Directed by: Carlos Gerbase
- Starring: Maitê Proença; Roberto Bomtempo
- Release date: October 2000
- Running time: 1h 40min
- Country: Brazil
- Language: Portuguese

Tolerance (Portuguese: Tolerância) is a 2000 Brazilian drama film directed by Carlos Gerbase.

== Cast ==
- Maitê Proença - Márcia
- Roberto Bomtempo - Júlio
- Maria Ribeiro - Anamaria
- Ana Maria Mainieri - Guida
- Nélson Diniz - Teodoro
- Werner Schünemann - Juvenal
- Márcio Kieling - Ciro
- Júlio Andrade - Pizza deliver
- Roberto Birindelli - Emanuel
