= José Louzeiro =

Brazilian writer

- José de Jesus Louzeiro
- Born: September 19, 1932; São Luís, Maranhão, Brazil
- Died: December 29, 2017 (aged 85); Rio de Janeiro, Rio de Janeiro (state), Brazil
- Occupations: Novel writer, screenwriter, reporter

José de Jesus Louzeiro (September 19, 1932 – December 29, 2017) was a Brazilian novelist, screenwriter and reporter.

Louzeiro was born in São Luís. He started working in 1948 as an intern for the newspaper O Imparcial. In 1953, when he was 21 years old, he moved to Rio de Janeiro where he worked for the magazine A Revista da Semana and O Jornal. Louzeiro also wrote for the newspapers Diário Carioca, Última Hora, Correio da Manhã, Folha and Diário do Grande ABC, as well as for the magazine Manchete.

Louzeiro's first foray in literature was in 1958 with the short story Depois da Luta. His experience as a police reporter marked his literary production; Louzeiro's writing about real-life crime stories in a novelized way was compared to Truman Capote's nonfiction novels. Other books by Louzeiro include Lúcio Flávio, o passageiro da agonia (1975), Araceli, meu amor (1976) and Infância dos mortos (1977). He also wrote children's books.

Louzeiro collaborated with film director Héctor Babenco, writing the screenplay for Lúcio Flávio, a 1977 film adaptation of Lúcio Flávio, o passageiro da agonia. Infância dos mortos was also adapted as the 1981 film Pixote.

== Death ==
Louzeiro died on December 29, 2017, in Rio de Janeiro.
