= Maitê Proença =

Brazilian actress and writer

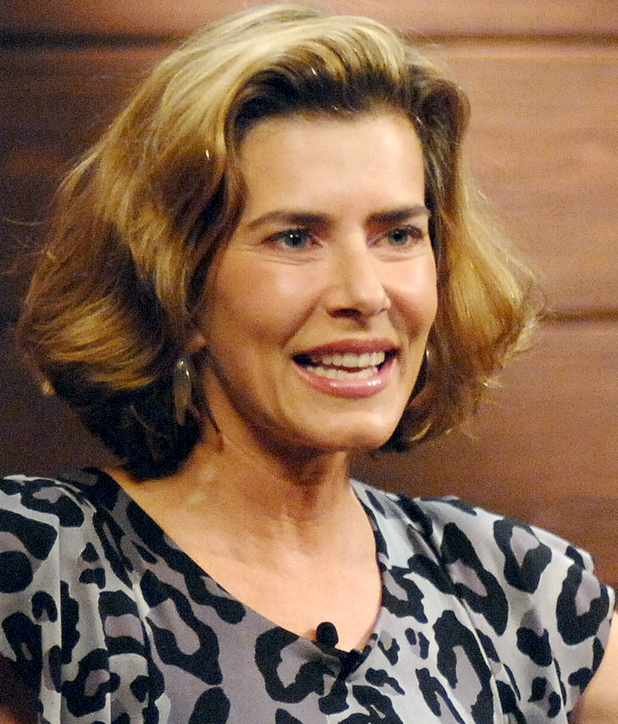
- Born: Maitê Proença Gallo; 28 January 1958 (age 68); São Paulo, Brazil
- Occupations: Actress; television presenter; writer
- Years active: 1979–present
- Website: maite.com.br

Maitê Proença Gallo (born 28 January 1958) is a Brazilian actress, television presenter and writer.

== Biography ==
Maitê Proença was born in São Paulo, Brazil. Her mother was Margot Proença, a philosophy and music teacher who died when Maitê was 12, killed by her father. Her father was Eduardo Gallo (died in 1989). She has a younger brother, René Augusto Proença Gallo, born in 1963. She is of Portuguese descent; both of her grandfathers were Portuguese.

As a child, Proença studied in an American school and spoke fluent English, as well as French, Spanish, and Italian. She attended the undergraduate psychology programme at the Pontifícia Universidade Católica de São Paulo and the University of São Paulo, where she studied journalism. Proença also attended a number of courses at the Sorbonne at the end of the 1970s, while living in France. Between 1977 and 1979 she traveled around the world to Europe, Asia, and Africa. She has maintained this habit, traveling to more than 70 countries.

In 1979, Proença had a serious car accident. She underwent two surgical operations and was bedridden for almost a year.

== Career ==
Proença has worked on Brazilian telenovelas, films and plays. Her role in the telenovela Dona Beija was her first major TV success in Brazil, Portugal and some 50 other countries where it was shown.

Proença has written two books. Her first book, Entre ossos e a escrita, published in 2005, contained the best of her essays. The second book, Uma Vida Inventada, sold 100,000 copies in Brazil and was exported to Portugal. She has also written two plays one of which, As Meninas, won her several prizes. She has a column in the Brazilian magazine Época.

Proença has been a TV host for Video Show (1983), Programa de Domingo (1987) and Saia Justa (2006/2007). In 2006, Proença wrote her first theater play, Achadas e Perdidas. In 2002, she made her debut as a theater producer with the play Buda.

In 2009, due to controversial remarks on the Brazilian TV show Saia Justa, Proença prompted public outrage in Portugal and was accused of being Lusophobic, though she has since affirmed numerous times her love for Portugal. She has since denied the accusation and recorded several apologies, as well as issuing one on her official blog. Proença emphasized that despite the misunderstanding, she is of recent Portuguese ancestry and likes Portugal and the Portuguese. For about a week, the affair was discussed or reported on several Portuguese television networks and major newspapers.

== Personal life ==
Proença released a book in 2008 entitled "An Invented Life", which reveals that at age 16, living in Paris, she had her first boyfriend, a Frenchman who was a few years older. Through carelessness, she became pregnant by him. After several fights, and various comings and goings, he decided that he would not support her, and abandoned her, pregnant. Without the emotional means to have a child, she went to a clinic in the area where she had an abortion and a quiet recovery. She revealed in interviews that she was sure of what she was doing at the time, not regretting the act, stating that women need to have the freedom to deal with their lives, with their own bodies. Over time, she had several boyfriends.

In 1982, having lived back in Brazil for a few years, Proença decided to live with her fiancé, Paulo Marinho, Odile Rubirosa's ex-husband, with whom she lived for 12 years and had her only daughter, Maria, born in October 1990. In 1995, she had a brief affair with cast member Victor Fasano. From 1996 to 2000 she lived with her boyfriend, Edgar Moura. From 2004 to 2007, she had a relationship with press officer Rodrigo Paiva. Later she briefly dated the Carioca entrepreneur Toninho Dias Leite and the Portuguese writer Miguel Sousa Tavares, as well as the businessman Alexandre Colombo, with whom she was with for two years, ending in 2011.

In spite of her relationship with Edgar Moura, with whom she lived for 4 years, and with Paulo Marinho, with whom she lived for 12 years, where on her personal website Paulo is described as "husband", Proença was never officially married with either one of them, to avoid losing the pension paid by SPPREV - São Paulo Previdência, which according to data from 2013, published by Época at the time was disclosed as being about R$13,000. Proença had been receiving this since 1989, the year of her father's death by suicide; her father was a prosecutor. In 2008 the value reached R$21,500. This pension is the result of complementary law 180/1978, which provides: "The pension attributed to the incapable or invalid shall be due for the duration of incapacity or invalidity and the unmarried daughter until marriage." According to the report, to keep the pension, it is common practice for many women to hold a religious marriage, live with a husband and even have children, but not officially register the relationship.

In November 2021, Maitê announced relationship with Adriana Calcanhotto, which ended in October 2022. Despite her experiences, Maitê refuses the bisexual label.

== Filmography ==
=== Television ===
Year	Title	Role	Notes
1979	Dinheiro Vivo	Joana	
1980	As Três Marias	Maria da Glória (Glória)	
1981	Jogo da Vida	Carla Barros	
1982	Sítio do Picapau Amarelo	Belle	Episode: "Beauty and the Beast"
1982	Elas por Elas	Woman idealized by Yeda	Support cast
1983	Vídeo Show	Presenter	
1983	Quarta Nobre	Eliana	Episode: "Mandrake"
1983	Guerra dos Sexos	Juliana de Alcântara Pereira Barreto	
1984	Marquesa de Santos	Domitila de Castro, Marchioness of Santos	
1985	Um Sonho a Mais	Valéria Moura Góes	
1986	Dona Beija	Ana Jacinta de São José (Dona Beja)	
1987	Corpo Santo	Adriana Ferreira	
1987	Sassaricando	Camila Abdalla Varella	
1987	Diálogo	Presenter	1987–88
1987	Programa de Domingo	Presenter	1987–89
1989	O Salvador da Pátria	Clotilde Ribeiro	
1991	O Sorriso do Lagarto	Ana Clara	
1991	Felicidade	Helena Sousa	
1993	Contos de Verão	Pâmela Jordão	
1993	Você Decide		Episode: "Máscara Negra"
1994	Você Decide		Episode: "A Viúva Negra"
1994	Confissões de Adolescente	Vivian	Episode: "Bárbara Vai a Luta"
1995	Cara & Coroa	Heloísa Souto Brandão	
1996	Você Decide		Episode: "O Fã"
1996	A Vida como Ela É...	Various characters	
1997	Sai de Baixo	Patrícia Renta	Episode: "Bonitinho, Mais Ordinário"
1998	Torre de Babel	Clara Soares	
1999	Mulher		Episode: "Perdas e Danos"
1999	Vila Madalena	Eugênia Junqueira	
2001	Estrela-Guia	Kalinda	
2002	Brava Gente	Betina	Episode: "O Enterro da Cafetina"
2003	Malhação	Daniela Correia Amorim	Season 10
2004	Da Cor do Pecado	Vera Campos Sodré (Verinha)	
2005	A Lua Me Disse	Regina	Episodes: "April 18–30, 2005"
2006	A Diarista	Regiana	Episode: "Saia Injusta"
2006	Saia Justa	Presenter	2006–10
2008	Faça Sua História	Bebete	Episode: "O Califa de Copacabana"
2008	Três Irmãs	Walquíria Pascolli	
2009	Caminho das Índias	Fernanda Estavanato (Nanda)	
2010	Passione	Stella Gouveia	
2012	Gabriela	Dona Sinházinha Guedes Mendonça	
2012	Guerra dos Sexos	Madonna	Episodes: "October 27–30, 2012"
2014	Extra Ordinários	Apresentadora	2014–15
2015	Alto Astral	Catarina Santana (Kitty)	
2016	Tá no Ar: a TV na TV	Helena	Episode: "February 2, 2016"
2016	Liberdade, Liberdade	Dionísia Raposo Viegas Manttini	
2017	Me Chama de Bruna	Miranda	
2024	Good Morning, Verônica	Diana	Main role (season 3)

=== Internet ===
Year	Title	Role	Notes
2013	Maitêndo Fundo	Herself	Short for the channel Porta dos Fundos)
2016	A Lenda do Mão de Luva	Dionísia	Gshow Webseries

=== Films ===
Year	Title	Role	Notes
1979	O Eterno Adeus		
1980	Prova de Fogo	Sandra	
1983	História Passional		
1986	Sexo Frágil	Ana	
1987	Brasa Adormecida	Bebel	
1988	The Lady from the Shanghai Cinema	Suzana	
1989	Kuarup	Maureen	
1989	Solidão, Uma Linda História de Amor		
1990	Beijo 2348/72	Catarina	
1995	16060	Eleanor	
1998	Vox Populi		Short film
1998	A Hora Mágica	Susana / Lyla	
1998	Paixão Perdida	Anna Rondi	
2000	Tolerance	Márcia	
2001	Bufo & Spallanzani	Delfina Delamare	
2001	A Partilha	Herself	Cameo
2001	Atlantis: The Lost Empire	Helga	Brazilian voice dubbing
2002	The Forest	Dona Yayá	
2004	Viva Sapato!	Caroline	
2005	Jogo Subterrâneo	Mercedes	
2005	Sal de Prata	Estrela de Cinema	
2007	Barros	Rafaela Dantas	Short film
2008	Onde Andará Dulce Veiga?	Dulce Veiga	
2010	Elvis & Madona	Soraya	
2012	Primeiro Dia de um Ano Qualquer	Consuelo Castilhos	
2015	A Natureza está Falando	Water	Dubbing
2016	My Hindu Friend	Débora	
2017	Bio	Doctor	
2017	Sinopse		Short film

== Theater ==
Year	Title	Role	Notes
1982	Mentiras Alucinantes de Um Casal Feliz		
1988	As Guerreiras do Amor		
1988	La Malasangre		
1989	Na Sauna		
1994	História de Nova York - Dorothy Parker		
1994	Confissões das Mulheres de 30		1994–95
2000	Isabel	Princess Isabel	2000–01
2002	Paixão de Cristo da Nova Jerusalém	Mary	
2002	Com a Pulga Atrás da Orelha	Madame Chandebise	2002–03
2005	Achadas e Perdidas	18 characters	2005–07
2009	As Meninas		
2013	À Beira do Abismo Me Cresceram Asas	Teresinha	
2017	A Esposa Ideal	Alice	2017–18
