= Casa da Mãe Joana =

2008 film directed by Hugo Carvana

- Theatrical release poster
- Directed by: Hugo Carvana
- Written by: Paulo Halm
- Starring: José Wilker; Paulo Betti; Laura Cardoso; Fernanda de Freitas
- Cinematography: Lauro Escorel
- Production company: MAC Produções
- Distributed by: Imagem Filmes
- Release date: 19 September 2008
- Running time: 95 minutes
- Country: Brazil
- Language: Portuguese

Casa da Mãe Joana is a 2008 Brazilian comedy film directed by Hugo Carvana. The film was released in Brazil on September 19, 2008.

Its sequel, Casa da Mãe Joana 2, was released on September 6, 2013.

== Cast ==
- José Wilker as Juca
- Paulo Betti as PR
- Antônio Pedro as Montanha
- Laura Cardoso as Herly
- Fernanda de Freitas as Tainacã
- Pedro Cardoso as Vavá
- Malu Mader as Laura
- Juliana Paes as Dolores Sol
- Agildo Ribeiro as Comendador/Lola Brandão
- Luís Carlos Miele as Camões
- Cláudio Marzo as Leopoldo
- Arlete Salles as Cliente
- Beth Goulart as Cliente
- Cláudia Borioni as Madame
- Maria Gladys as Bêbada no ateliê
- Lu Grimaldi as Cliente
- Roberto Maya as Oficial de Justiça
- Hugo Carvana as Salomão

== Critical response ==
One film critic at the website Papo de Cinema wrote that "it must have been a much more fun project behind the scenes than on this side of the screen". Another critic at Folha de S.Paulo analyzed that the comedy about the malandro carioca "loses its appeal with sitcom structure". At Omelete another critic considered the film to be a "type of surface-level comedy".
