= Leo Vaz =

- Born: June 6, 1890; Capivari, Brazil
- Died: March 5, 1973 (aged 82); São Paulo, Brazil
- Occupation: author

Leo Vaz (June 6, 1890 – March 5, 1973) was a Brazilian writer, teacher and journalist. He was the author of novels and short stories in a satirical style

== Biography ==
Leonel Vaz de Barros was born in Capivari. He graduated from the Normal School as a teacher in 1911 and taught in the cities of São Paulo and Recife( Escola de Navegação) until 1918.

As a journalist, he began writing for the newspaper of Piracicaba.

In 1918 he moved to São Paulo and, with the support of Monteiro Lobato and Oswald de Andrade, embraced a journalistic career, writing for periodicals such as Jornal do Brasil, Jornal do Comércio, O Estado de S. Paulo, where he was editor, secretary and director, until his retirement in 1951

As a journalist made a brilliant career as Sud Menucci, Guilherme de Almeida, Afonso Schmidt, Galeão Coutinho, Paulo Gonçalves and Nestor Pestana

In 1969, although retired, he returned to writing in the O Estado de S. Paulo, where he remained until his death in March 1973. He died, aged 82, in São Paulo.

== Works ==
- Professor Jeremias (1920)
- Ritinha e outros casos (1923)
- O Burrico Lúcio (1951): tells the story of "The Golden Ass" of Lucian of Samosata;
- Páginas Vadias (1957)

== Bibliography ==
- Koshiyama, Alice Mitika. Monteiro Lobato: Intellectual, empresário, editor. São Paulo: Editora EdUSP, 2006. ISBN 85-314-0780-X
- Fernando, Jorge. Vida, obra e época de Paulo Setúbal: Um homem de alma ardente. São Paulo: Editora Geração Editorial, 2003. v. 2 ISBN 85-7509-101-8
