= Lula Lá =

Song by Hilton Acioli
- Published: 1989
- Released: 1989 Brazilian presidential election
- Length: 1:27
- Songwriter: Hilton Acioli

"Lula Lá" (lit. 'Lula There', also known as "Sem medo de ser feliz", meaning "Not Afraid to Be Happy") is a song written by Brazilian singer and songwriter Hilton Acioli for the second round of the presidential campaign of Luiz Inácio Lula da Silva, of the Workers' Party (PT), in 1989. Although Lula lost the election to Fernando Collor de Mello, the song is still widely remembered to this day. Remixed versions of the song were used by Lula's campaigns in 1994 and 2022, and one titled "Dilma Lá" was used in 2010 for PT presidential candidate Dilma Rousseff.

== Composition ==
In February 1989, Acioli—previously the creator of jingles for Luiza Erundina and Celso Daniel, both PT members who had won the previous year's municipal elections in São Paulo and Santo André, respectively—was approached by advertiser Paulo Tarso Santos, the marketing coordinator for the PT's presidential campaign, with the objective of creating a song for Lula. Santos's idea was to play with the candidate's name, but Acioli disliked the concept and jotted down "the Lula-lá out of politeness." He would later conclude that there was "nothing better" than the advertiser's suggestion and began working on a composition based on the idea. Acioli then created a samba-exaltação titled "Vai lá e vê" about the "highlands, rivers, and green seas" of the country, with a chorus containing the line "Go and see that joy has waited long enough." After finishing this piece, he ended up writing another one, which would become the campaign's definitive song.

This second jingle would later be reworked (with the new title "Sem medo de ser feliz", meaning "Not Afraid to Be Happy") and recorded by Djavan, Gilberto Gil, and Chico Buarque. Acioli presented both songs to the PT campaign leadership, who chose the latter, reserving the samba for more discreet use during the campaign. According to journalist Ricardo Kotscho, PT leaders were highly resistant to the song, and it was only approved due to Lula's own insistence. While Acioli created the song for the PT campaign, its enormous impact led to him being invited by numerous politicians to compose songs for them afterwards. As he put it, "Lula Lá" became his "showcase," remaining popular for "13 years [sic] from 1989 to 2002."

== Use in election campaigns ==
"Lula Lá" was performed by numerous artists and Brazilian citizens (in the original 1989 version, including Marieta Severo, Lucélia Santos, Gal Costa, Roberto Bonfim, Chico Buarque, Lídia Brondi, José Mayer, Cristina Pereira, Tássia Camargo, Cláudia Abreu, Malu Mader, Betty Faria, Walter Breda, Aracy Balabanian, Marcos Winter, Hugo Carvana, Joyce, Flávio Migliaccio, Chico Díaz, Beth Carvalho, Reginaldo Faria, Jonas Bloch, Arlete Salles, Otávio Müller, Felipe Camargo, Wagner Tiso, Carla Marins, Armando Bogus, Elba Ramalho, Adriana Esteves, Marcos Paulo, Guilherme Leme, Cláudio Marzo, Eliezer Motta, and Joana Fomm) during the free electoral airtime of the Frente Brasil Popular (formed by PT, PCdoB, and PSB) on radio and television. The music video was produced by Paulo Betti and Odair José and directed by Paulo José. Another video featured three of the artists (Gilberto Gil, Chico Buarque, and Djavan) performing "Sem medo de ser feliz." The "Lula Lá" video had two ending versions (both with a clarification stating: "All artists participated in this musical voluntarily [...]"): one where the text continued with "They believe in a better Brazil and vote for Lula." (used in the 1989 runoff; a final version of this one prefaced the statement with "In the 1989 election, [...]"), and another where it continued with "[...] and vote for Lula for a better Brazil." (used in the 1989 first round).

Another recording of the original version was used in the runoff of the 2002 presidential campaign, the election in which Lula was finally victorious (this time in an instrumental version). For this campaign, the song was reworked by Gil in his Nas Nuvens studio.

In 2008, the melody was reused for the jingle of PT candidate Alessandro Molon, running for Mayor of Rio de Janeiro. Two years later, during the runoff of the 2010 presidential election, composer and conductor Wagner Tiso re-recorded the jingle as "Dilma lá," in support of Dilma Rousseff's campaign (this version was performed by Djavan).

In May 2022, a new version for the presidential campaign was released, adapted by Leonardo Leone, with executive production by Janja Lula and Ricardo Stuckert, and featuring artists like Pabllo Vittar, Duda Beat, Chico César, Martinho da Vila, Lenine, Maria Rita, Paulo Miklos, Zélia Duncan, Flora Gil, Gilsons, Russo Passapusso (BaianaSystem), Mart'nália, Mateo (Francisco, el Hombre), Otto, Teresa Cristina, Odair José, Antônio Grassi, Daniel Ganjaman, Dade Carvalho, Francis and Olivia Hime, Rogéria Holtz, Júlia DePaula, and Luciana Wornes, among others.

Other versions were released during the campaign, blending Brazilian rhythms and sung by regional and local artists and residents.

== Lyrics (1989 version) ==
Passa o tempo e tanta gente a trabalhar
De repente, essa clareza pra votar
Quem sempre foi sincero em confiar
Sem medo de ser feliz, quero ver chegar

Lula lá, brilha uma estrela
Lula lá, cresce a esperança
Lula lá, o Brasil criança
Na alegria de se abraçar

Lula lá, com sinceridade
Lula lá, com toda a certeza pra você
Meu primeiro voto
Pra fazer brilhar nossa estrela

Lula lá, é a gente junto
Lula lá, valeu a espera
Lula lá, meu primeiro voto
Pra fazer brilhar nossa estrela

Translation:

Time passes, and so many people have been working,
When suddenly, this clarity for voting arises.
Who has always been sincere in trusting,
Not afraid to be happy, I want to see it arrive.

Lula there, a star shines,
Lula there, hope grows,
Lula there, Brazil as a child,
In the joy of embracing.

Lula there, with sincerity,
Lula there, with all the certainty for you,
My first vote,
To make our star shine.

Lula there, it's us together,
Lula there, the wait was worth it,
Lula there, my first vote,
To make our star shine.
