= Rafard =

- Municipality
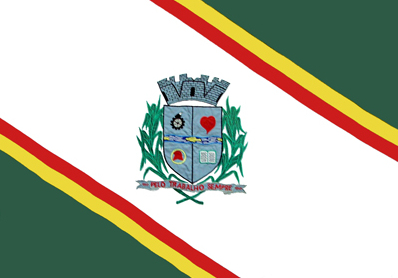
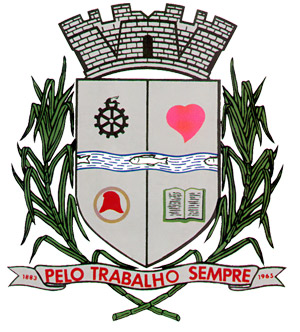
- Flag Coat of arms

- Location in São Paulo state

- Location in Brazil
- Coordinates: 23°0′42″S 47°31′37″W
- Country: Brazil
- Region: Southeast
- State: São Paulo

Area
  - Total: 122 km^{2} (47 sq mi)

Population (2020)
  - Total: 9,101
  - Density: 74.6/km^{2} (193/sq mi)
- Time zone: UTC−3 (BRT)

Rafard is a municipality in the state of São Paulo in Brazil. The population is 9,101 (2020 est.) in an area of 122 km^{2}. The elevation is 515 m. Before 1965, when it became an independent municipality, it was part of Capivari.

As of 2012, the Prefect of Rafard is Márcio Minamioka. The Vice-Prefect is Heitor Turolla.

== Media ==
In telecommunications, the city was served by Companhia Telefônica Brasileira until 1973, when it began to be served by Telecomunicações de São Paulo. In July 1998, this company was acquired by Telefónica, which adopted the Vivo brand in 2012.

The company is currently an operator of cell phones, fixed lines, internet (fiber optics/4G) and television (satellite and cable).

== Religion ==
Christianity is present in the city as follows:

=== Catholic Church ===
The Catholic church in the municipality is part of the Roman Catholic Diocese of Piracicaba.

=== Protestant Church ===
The most diverse evangelical beliefs are present in the city, mainly Pentecostal, including the Assemblies of God in Brazil (the largest evangelical church in the country), Christian Congregation in Brazil, among others. These denominations are growing more and more throughout Brazil.

== People ==
- Tarsila do Amaral (1886–1973), painter. Born in the area of Fazenda São Bernardo.
- Paulo Betti (1952–), actor, film producer and director.

== See also ==
- List of municipalities in São Paulo
