= Grupo Bloch =

Brazilian media conglomerate

Gráficos Bloch S.A.
- Trade name: Grupo Bloch
- Company type: Sociedade anônima
- Industry: Mass media
- Founded: 1922; 104 years ago in Rio de Janeiro, Brazil
- Founder: Adolpho Bloch
- Defunct: 2000; 26 years ago
- Owner: Pedro Jack Kapeller
- Subsidiaries: Bloch Som e Imagem; Rádio Manchete

Grupo Bloch, also known as Empresas Bloch, was a Brazilian media conglomerate, founded by Ukrainian businessman Adolpho Bloch's family after their arrival in Rio de Janeiro in 1922, when they created Joseph Bloch & Filhos company. The company, which published pamphlets and other printed material, also started to print magazines. Thus, in 1953, the company launched Manchete magazine. With its successful launch, the publishing division of Bloch Editores was established.

The group owned various Brazilian communication companies. At the end of the 1970s, the company funded the Rádio Manchete, a medium wave (AM) radio station as well as Manchete FM radio network. With the success of the radio stations, at the beginning of the 1980s the group entered the Brazilian government's competition to be one of the dealers of two television networks formed from the hunting concessions of the networks Tupi and Excelsior. Grupo Bloch was one of the bid winners, along with Grupo Silvio Santos, and immediately launched the Sistema Brasileiro de Televisão (SBT). The Rede Manchete, owned by Grupo Bloch, had already been launched in 1983.

With millions in debt, the company had to sell Rede Manchete in 1992, but after the new owner, Hamilton Lucas de Oliveira, did not comply with the contract of sale, Grupo Bloch regained ownership of the network. Still accumulating debts, the company had to get rid of the television business in 1999, selling concessions for five owned-and-operated stations of Manchete to the Grupo TeleTV owners, Amilcare Dallevo Jr. and Marcelo de Carvalho, who launched a new network called RedeTV! to replace Rede Manchete.

Bloch Editores filed for bankruptcy in 1999, and was closed in 2000. The company portfolio of magazines was sold to Manchete Editora, founded in 2002 by Mark Dvoskin. The radio stations of the Manchete FM network were sold to Grupo Sol Panamby, to politician Orestes Quércia, who turned it into Nova Brasil FM network owned-and-operated stations, with the exception of the station in Rio de Janeiro, which transmits the radio network Feliz FM. The São Paulo station was later sold to the Grupo RBS, which soon after sold it to Paulo Henrique Cardoso, the son of former president of the republic Fernando Henrique Cardoso. Since 2010 it has broadcast the programming of Rádio Disney on the old Manchete FM frequency. The only remaining media group company, Rádio Manchete, ended its activities at the end of 2015, remaining on the air over the Internet through streaming media. The archives of magazines and television, as well as group-owned properties, were sold to pay the debts of their companies.

Bloch Som e Imagem, a company created to produce programs for Rede Manchete, the bankrupt estate of TV Manchete Ltda., legal name of Rede Manchete, and the concession of Radio Manchete, granted for the Rádio Federal Ltda. EPP, are still owned by the Grupo Bloch, managed by Pedro Jack Kapeller, the nephew of Adolpho Bloch and heir to his uncle's companies.

== Bibliography ==
- Aconteceu na Manchete: Histórias que Ninguém Contou (in Portuguese). Desiderata. 2008. p. 432. ISBN 9788599070703.
- Bloch, Arnaldo (2008). Os Irmãos Karamabloch: Acensão e Queda de um Império Familiar (in Portuguese). São Paulo: Companhia das Letras. p. 339. ISBN 9788535913323.
- Francfort, Elmo (2008). Rede Manchete: Aconteceu Virou História (in Portuguese). São Paulo: Imprensa Oficial do Estado de São Paulo. p. 424. ISBN 9788570605894.
