= Rodrigo Santiago =

Uruguayan footballer (born 1990)

Rodrigo "Lolo" Santiago
Personal information
- Full name: Rodrigo Daniel Santiago Pintos
- Date of birth: March 12, 1990 (age 36)
- Place of birth: Montevideo; Uruguay
- Height: 5 ft 9 in (1.75 m)
- Position: Striker

Team information
- Current team: New Jersey Alliance
- Number: 11

Youth career
- 2003–2008: Parsippany SC

College career
Years	Team	Apps	(Gls)
2008	Montclair State Red Hawks	22	(5)

Senior career*
Years	Team	Apps	(Gls)
2009	New Jersey Rangers	1	(0)
2009	Juventud de Las Piedras	6	(0)
2010–2014	Canadian Soccer Club	22	(3)
2014–2015	Icon FC		
2015–2017	New Jersey Copa		
2017–2018	FC Motown		
2018–2021	New Jersey Copa		
2022–	New Jersey Alliance		
- * Club domestic league appearances and goals

Rodrigo Daniel Santiago Pintos (born February 17, 1990) is a Uruguayan semi-professional footballerer who plays as a striker for the New Jersey Alliance.

== Early life ==
Born in Montevideo, Uruguay and raised in Rockaway, New Jersey, Santiago played high school soccer at Morris Hills High School.

== Career ==
=== Club ===
During his time in the states Santiago played most of his youth club soccer in Parsippany Soccer Club. In early 2009, he joined New Jersey Rangers and played only a single game in the USL Premier Development League due to an injury that kept him off the fields for the rest of the season.

=== Professional ===
Santiago moved back to Uruguay in July 2009 after 12 years in the United States of America. He joined the u-19 of Juventud de Las Piedras of the Uruguayan Primera División, in 2010 he joined new founded Canadian Soccer Club that was entering the Uruguayan Segunda División Amateur. In 2013, he helped the club win their first ever championship and promotion to the professional Uruguayan Segunda División. Santiago also scored the first official goal in the history of the club Canadian Soccer Club from Uruguay. "Lolo" signed his first professional contract in October 2013 on a one-year agreement with the club. In August 2014 he returned to the United States and signed with professional club team Icon FC of the American Soccer League (ASL) on a one-year deal agreement as well .
