= Adolpho Bloch =

Brazilian press and television businessman

- Born: 8 October 1908
- Died: 19 November 1995 (aged 87)
- Awards: Grand Cross of the Order of Prince Henry

Signature
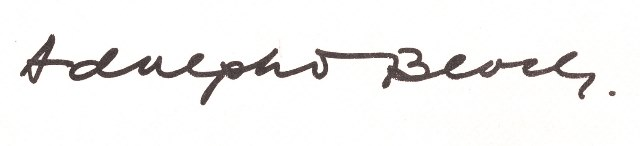

Adolpho Bloch GCIH, born Avram Yossievitch Bloch (in Ukrainian: Аврам Йоссійович Блох; in Russian: Аврам Йосиевич Блох) (8 October 1908 – 19 November 1995), sometimes written Adolfo Bloch, was a Brazilian press and television businessman. Founder of the eponymous Bloch media group, he was one of the creators of the weekly magazine Manchete, in 1952, and also of Rádio Manchete (1980) and the television network Rede Manchete (1983), now defunct.

== Life ==
The Bloch family was of Jewish origin. They suffered from hunger and repression during the Russian Revolution. In 1917, Adolpho Bloch and seventeen relatives left their hometown, Zhitomir, to live in Kiev. In 1921, he had to leave Ukraine permanently. After a nine-month stopover in Naples; they were able to leave for Brazil, arriving in Rio de Janeiro in 1922.

The Blochs had worked in the printing industry, and upon arriving in their new country they continued in this sector. Their first job was printing ballots for the popular jogo do bicho, an illegal lottery. In 1931 they obtained Brazilian nationality.

During the 1940s, Adolpho worked at the Rio Gráfica publishing house, owned by Roberto Marinho. By that time, he had already made friends with artists and politicians, and frequented the bohemian area of Rio. There was the Grêmio Recreativo Familiar Kananga do Japão, where he would go to dance forró in the so-called rodas de gafieira. This place would inspire the 1989 telenovela Kananga do Japão, of which Adolpho was the creator.

On 26 April 1952, Adolfo Bloch launched the first issue of Manchete magazine, a national weekly that became the most widely read in the country. Among of the writers who worked in the magazine were Carlos Drummond de Andrade and Rubem Braga. From there, he began building one of the largest media empires in Latin America, Grupo Bloch. Bloch was known by his close friendship to president Juscelino Kubitschek.

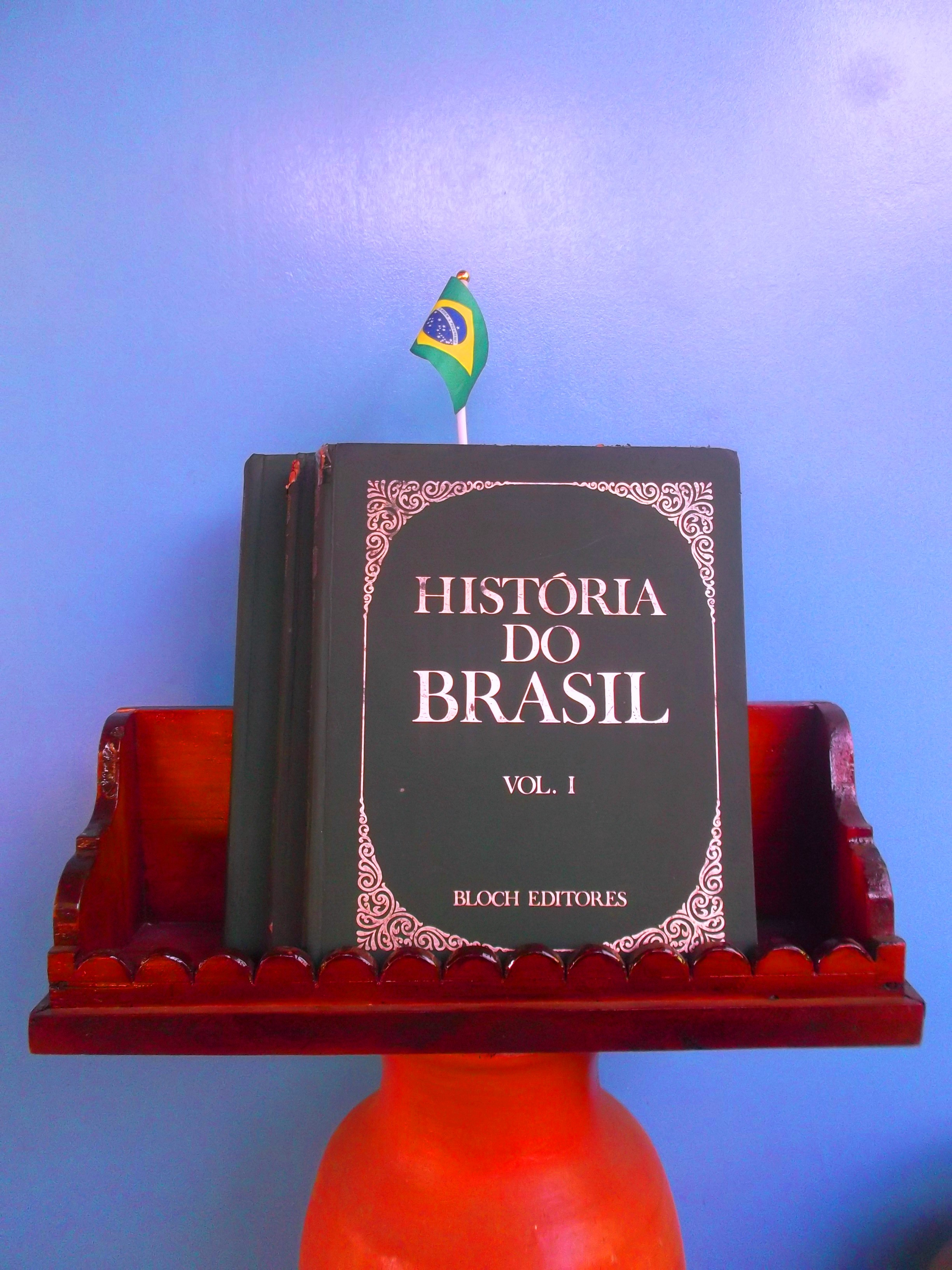
Collection História do Brasil (Bloch Editores, 1972).

From its foundation until the mid-1970s, Bloch Editores was located on Frei Caneca Street, in the center of Rio. Then, its headquarters moved to Russel Street in the Glória neighborhood (South Zone of Rio). In addition to Manchete, they also published books and magazines in a wide variety of segments: Fatos e Fotos, Pais e Filhos, Desfile, Amiga and Sétimo Céu.

Neither radio nor television ever aroused the businessman's interest. However, in 1980, with the collaboration of his nephew Pedro Jack Kapeller, Rede Manchete de Rádio FM was launched, with 5 stations in the country, and Rádio Manchete AM, in Rio de Janeiro.

Also in the early 1980s, Adolpho Bloch created a team to develop the project for a television station. On 19 August 1981, the Brazilian government granted Bloch four of the concessions held by the former Rede Tupi (the first TV station in Latin America, which was closed due to bankruptcy in 1980). After several postponements, Manchete began broadcasting on 5 June 1983. That same year, Bloch bought Rádio Clube do Pará, which remained in his hands until 1992.

In November 1995, Bloch was admitted to the Beneficência Portuguesa hospital in São Paulo, to treat two problems: pulmonary embolism and dysfunction of the mitral valve prosthesis of the heart. In the early morning of the 19th, his condition worsened and he needed an emergency operation, which he could not overcome.

Bloch died at the age of 87, without having had any children. He left only his wife, Anna Bentes, with whom he had lived since 1980, not having made the marriage official until 1992. His body was laid to rest at the headquarters of the publishing house.

The conglomerate's companies were then controlled by his nephew Pedro Jack Kapeller (known as Jaquito), who remained at the helm until 2000, when the Bloch Group went bankrupt and dissolved.

== Awards and tributes ==
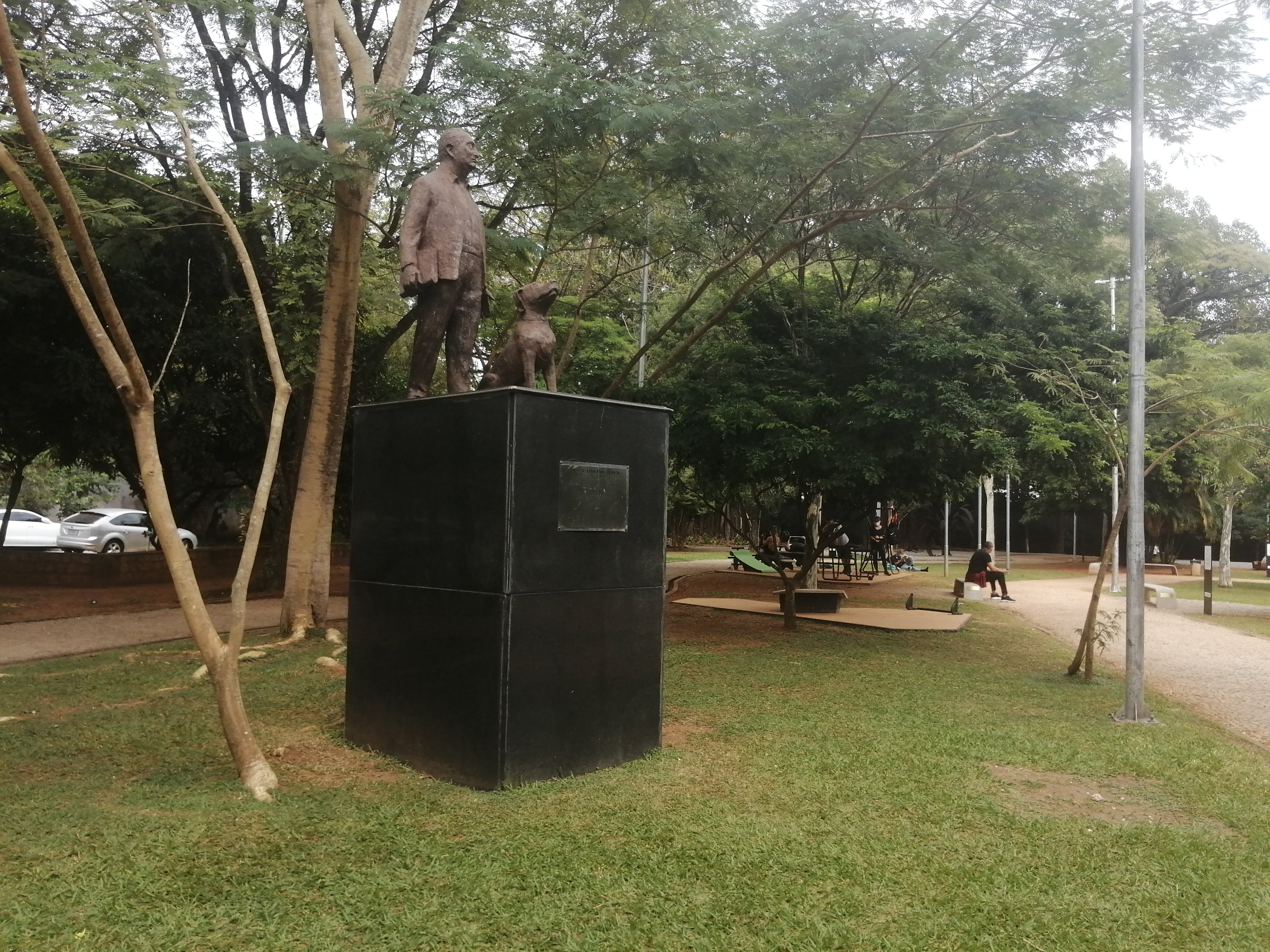
Statue of Adolpho Bloch at the eponymous square in São Paulo.

- On 26 November 1987, he was awarded the Grand Cross of the Order of Infante Dom Henrique of Portugal.
- In 1996, a park in the city of São Paulo was named Praça Adolpho Bloch, where a statue of the businessman is also located.
- In 1998, a Technical School bearing his name was inaugurated, located in the Maracanã neighborhood, in Rio de Janeiro; becoming the only public communication school in Latin America.
- Adolpho Bloch was played by actor Sérgio Viotti in the miniseries JK, released in 2006.

== Bibliography ==
- Bloch, Adolpho (1978). O pilão (in Brazilian Portuguese). Bloch Editores. ISBN 978-85-258-0397-9. (Autobiografia)
- Bloch, Arnaldo (2008). Os irmãos Karamabloch : ascensão e queda de um império familiar. Companhia das Letras. ISBN 978-85-359-1332-3. OCLC 431378731.
- Pena, Felipe (2010). Seu Adolpho : uma biografia em fractais de Adolpho Bloch, fundador da TV e da Rede Manchete. Vermelho Marinho. ISBN 978-85-62851-55-1. OCLC 730113261.
- "Especial per la mort d'Adolpho Bloch". Revista Amiga (1334): 1-14. 28 November 1995.
- A Família Bloch e a revista Manchete: Faces da História da imprensa brasileira (Universidade Federal de Pernambuco thesis) (in Brazilian Portuguese). 2017.
