= Rede Manchete =

Former Brazilian television network

Rede Manchete Ltda.
- Type: Free-to-air commercial television network
- Country: Brazil
- Stations: TV Manchete Belo Horizonte; TV Manchete Fortaleza; TV Manchete Recife; TV Manchete Rio de Janeiro; TV Manchete São Paulo
- Affiliates: TV Pampa
- Headquarters: Rio de Janeiro, Brazil

Programming
- Language: Portuguese
- Picture format: 480p SDTV

Ownership
- Owner: Pedro Jack Kapeller
- Parent: Grupo Bloch
- Key people: Adolpho Bloch

History
- Founded: 5 June 1983
- Launched: 5 June 1983
- Founder: Adolpho Bloch
- Replaced: Rede Tupi
- Closed: 10 May 1999 (15 years, 11 months and 5 days)
- Replaced by: RedeTV!
- Former names: TV Manchete Ltda. (1983-1999) TV Ômega Ltda. (May-November 1999)

Rede Manchete (Portuguese pronunciation: [ˈʁedʒi mɐ̃ˈʃɛtʃi]; lit.: Headline Network; also known as TV Manchete or only Manchete) was a Brazilian television network that was founded in Rio de Janeiro on 5 June 1983 by the Ukrainian-Brazilian journalist and businessman Adolpho Bloch. The network remained on the air until 10 May 1999. It was part of Grupo Bloch, which published the magazine Manchete by Bloch Editores, its publishing division; the television network was named after the magazine.

Manchete was known for its programming based on journalism, covering the world and Brazilian sport, with major sporting events. Telenovelas, series and miniseries from Manchete also made history in the Brazilian television dramaturgy. In addition to their own schedule, Manchete is known as airing Japanese programmes like tokusatsu and anime, including some of the Super Sentai series (Choushinsei Flashman, Dengeki Sentai Changeman), Sailor Moon, Kamen Rider Black, Black RX, MegaBeast Investigator Juspion and Saint Seiya.

In May 1999, the partners Amilcare Dallevo and Marcelo de Carvalho (known as TeleTV Group) bought the licenses of Manchete, moved the headquarters to Barueri, and changed the network's name to RedeTV!.

== History ==
=== Early history ===
After TV Excelsior's shutdown on September 30, 1970, and Rede Tupi's shutdown on July 18, 1980, both stemming from internal opposition to the military dictatorship at the time, the Federal Government held an auction for the establishment of two new television networks that would take the place of the former, extinct networks. The nine available broadcast licenses were then split between the winners - Silvio Santos and Adolpho Bloch - with Bloch acquiring five stations: Rio de Janeiro, São Paulo, Recife, Fortaleza, and Belo Horizonte. The acquisition was codified as federal decree 85842. Initially planned to launch between September and November 1982, and then March 1983, Manchete began operations at 7:00 pm on 5 June 1983 initially with no sound, then restarting with a speech by Bloch, followed by a segment with the network's logo flying over Brazil and then stopping on a building. Following this, President Figueiredo gave a brief speech wishing Manchete success. The network received high ratings in Rio de Janeiro, and as a result, it suddenly moved to second place in viewership in that area.

In the beginning, the network broadcast various shows and operas, like TV Record in 60s, bringing the focus for the A and B Classes. In 1984, model and actress Xuxa presented the Clube da Criança program in 1984, beating sometimes TV Globo's morning show, Balão Magico. This was the year it began a rival coverage of the Brazilian Carnival in Rio de Janeiro, its most successful one.

In 1985, with two years of existence, losses of Manchete were evident. The network entered its first financial crisis. Bloch, in 1988, wanted to sell the network and asked for US$350 million. In the 1990s, congressman Paulo Octávio made a proposal to Adolpho Bloch of the proposed purchase of TV Manchete for US$200 million. The Paulo Octávio partner was the businessman João Carlos Di Genio, but the sale was not made. Editora Abril also showed interest in the network. Then the IBF company took Manchete, but then had revoked its management justice. Adolpho Bloch took control of the network, with staff salaries six months late. Within four months, Bloch had brought staff pay back up to date.

By 1987, for the first time, Rede Manchete and Rede Globo jointly broadcast the Brazilian Carnival to all over the country. The next year, however, the network was in a weak financial situation after just 5 years, but came out stronger.

=== The Pantanal phenomenon ===
1990 saw the launch of the telenovela Pantanal (named after the Pantanal wetlands on which it was set), which would beat the TV Globo telenovela Rainha da Sucata (Queen of the Junk) in popularity and score. The story mixed romance, very beautiful images of the Mato Grosso Pantanal and a bit of the supernatural. The plot centered around a son of a big farmer of Mato Grosso that came to know his father for the first time, and also Juma, a wild lady that lives in a forest cabin and transforms herself in a jaguar when she's angry, with which he falls in love. Afterwards, Manchete continued making telenovelas that were well known for their good image and content quality. They were exported to various countries, but never proved as successful as Pantanal or competing telenovelas from the Rede Globo.

However, beginning in 1992 and continuing through the end of the decade, the network was forced off the air three times; the first of those shutdowns was due to an invasion of employees at the network's transmission tower in São Paulo.

=== Closure ===
After Bloch's death in 1995, his nephew Pedro Jack Kapeller became president of Manchete. Manchete's financial troubles deepened after the 1998 FIFA World Cup, when the network's income fell 40 percent. As a result, the network laid off 540 employees, as well as pay day wages of the remaining employees. In October 1998, the network cut the production of almost all of its programs, including the telenovela Brida. The network was to be sold to Reborn in Christ Church in January 1999, but in February of the same year, the proposal was withdrawn due to a breach of contractual clauses. On 8 May 1999, Rede Manchete's license was sold to TeleTV Group for US$608 million.

== Slogans ==
1983: A TV do Ano 2000 (TV of the Year 2000)
TV de Primeira Classe (First Class TV)

1990: O Brasil passa na Manchete (Brazil passes on Manchete)

1997: Qualidade em Primeiro Lugar (Quality in First Place)
1998: Você em Primeiro Lugar (You in First place)

1999: Nova Manchete, tudo novo no Verão 99 (New Manchete, all new in Summer 99)

== Telenovelas and series ==
1984

- Marquesa de Santos
- Viver a Vida
- Santa Marta Fabril

1985

- Tudo em Cima
- Tamanho Família
- Antônio Maria
- Joana

1986

- Dona Beija
- Novo Amor
- Tudo ou Nada
- Mania de Querer

1987

- Corpo Santo
- Helena
- Carmem
- A Rainha da Vida

1988

- Olho por Olho

1989

- Kananga do Japão

1990

- Pantanal
- Fronteiras do Desconhecido
- Escrava Anastácia
- O Canto das Sereias
- Mãe de Santo
- Rosa dos Rumos
- A História de Ana Raio e Zé Trovão

1991

- Filhos do Sol
- Ilha das Bruxas
- O Farol
- Na Rede de Intrigas
- Floradas na Serra
- O Guaraní
- O Fantasma da Ópera
- Amazônia

1992

- Amazônia – Parte II

1993

- Família Brasil
- Guerra sem Fim
- O Marajá (not aired)

1994

- Incrível, Fantástico, Extraordinário
- 74.5 – Uma Onda no Ar

1995

- Tocaia Grande

1996

- Xica da Silva

1997

- Mandacaru

1998

- Brida

== News programming ==
Logo of the newscast from 1996 to 1999.

The network's main newscast was entitled Jornal da Manchete, which began airing on 6 June 1983 and aired for the final time on 8 May 1999. It was the longest running programme in the network's history.

When Jornal da Manchete first premiered, it had an excessive duration of two hours (with commercials), and was divided into several segments that would eventually become separate programmes. The duration of the newscast would be reduced to 30 minutes after the 1985 Brazilian presidential election.

The opening theme of the programme was based on "Videogame" by the Brazilian group Roupa Nova; the original master recording was used from 1983 until 1989.
