= Manchete (magazine) =

- Categories: News magazine
- Frequency: Weekly
- Publisher: Bloch Editores
- Founder: Adolpho Bloch
- First issue: 26 April 1952; 74 years ago
- Final issue: 29 July 2000
- Country: Brazil
- Based in: Rio de Janeiro
- Language: Portuguese

Manchete was a Brazilian weekly news magazine published from 1952 to 2000 by Bloch Editores. Founded by Adolpho Bloch, the magazine's name would be given to the defunct television network Rede Manchete. Manchete was considered one of the main magazines of its time, second only to O Cruzeiro. The magazine was inspired by publications such as Paris Match and Life, relying on photojournalism. Among the writers who collaborated for Manchete were Carlos Drummond de Andrade, Rubem Braga, Manuel Bandeira, Paulo Mendes Campos, Fernando Sabino, David Nasser and Nelson Rodrigues. French photographer Jean Manzon was responsible by the magazine's main pictures.

In 2000, with the bankruptcy of Bloch Editores, the magazine's name and rights were bought by Marcos Dvoskin. Manchete has been republished only sporadically, in special editions.
