= Bertrand Island Amusement Park =

Former amusement park in Mount Arlington, NJ

- Interactive map of Bertrand Island Amusement Park
- Location: Brigantine, Lake Hopatcong, US
- Coordinates: 40°54′42″N 74°39′35″W
- Status: Defunct
- Opened: 1910
- Closed: 1983

Bertrand Island Amusement Park was located on Lake Hopatcong, New Jersey in the Borough of Mount Arlington, New Jersey. It was actually located on a narrow finger-shaped peninsula, surrounded by water on three sides, that jutted into Lake Hopatcong.

The park began as a bathing beach and soon started adding amusements in the 1910s when a connection was constructed via a trolley by the Morris County Traction Company. Later, during the 1920s, it was expanded by the owner, Louis Kraus, and ultimately included some 20 rides including a wooden roller coaster, an airplane swing, bumper cars, picnic areas, a Skee-Ball arcade, dance hall, and a cafeteria. It was located on the beach, and had a diving tower and boat docks. Its carousel for many years was a famous Illions Monarch II Supreme which was later sold to Circus World in Florida.

Bertrand Island Amusement Park operated for over 70 years, but finally was closed in 1983, due to the competition from larger theme parks and Lake Hopatcong's evolution to an all-year-round community. In 2001, the area was developed into townhouses.^{[1]}

A narrated history of Bertrand Island Park with video footage and many photographs was completed by the Lake Hopatcong Historical Museum. The museum also has an exhibit on Bertrand Island Park featuring many items from the park.

== In popular culture ==
Scenes from the 1985 Woody Allen-directed The Purple Rose of Cairo were filmed in the Mt. Arlington area. A scene featuring Jeff Daniels and Mia Farrow was shot in the entranceway to the "Wildcat" wooden roller coaster.
