= Lake Hopatcong Yacht Club =

Coordinates: 40°55′45″N 74°38′58″W

- Burgee
- Short name: LHYC
- Founded: 1905
- Location: Bertrand Island, Mount Arlington, Morris County, New Jersey
- Website: www.lhyc.com

The Lake Hopatcong Yacht Club is a private yacht club located in Mount Arlington, Morris County, New Jersey, United States, in the northwestern part of New Jersey, on the small peninsula of Bertrand Island along the state's largest lake, Lake Hopatcong.

The club is non-profit, and governed by a slate of volunteers, elected by its members. The organization features an active sailing and social schedule, with an emphasis on activities for the entire family.

== History ==
The club was founded in 1905, and the current clubhouse dates to 1910. In 2004, as part of the Club's centennial celebrations, N.J. Landing wrote A century of summers: the Lake Hopatcong Yacht Club's first hundred years which was a joint project of the Lake Hopatcong Historical Museum and the Lake Hopatcong Yacht Club.

== Clubhouse ==
- Lake Hopatcong Yacht Club
- U.S. National Register of Historic Places
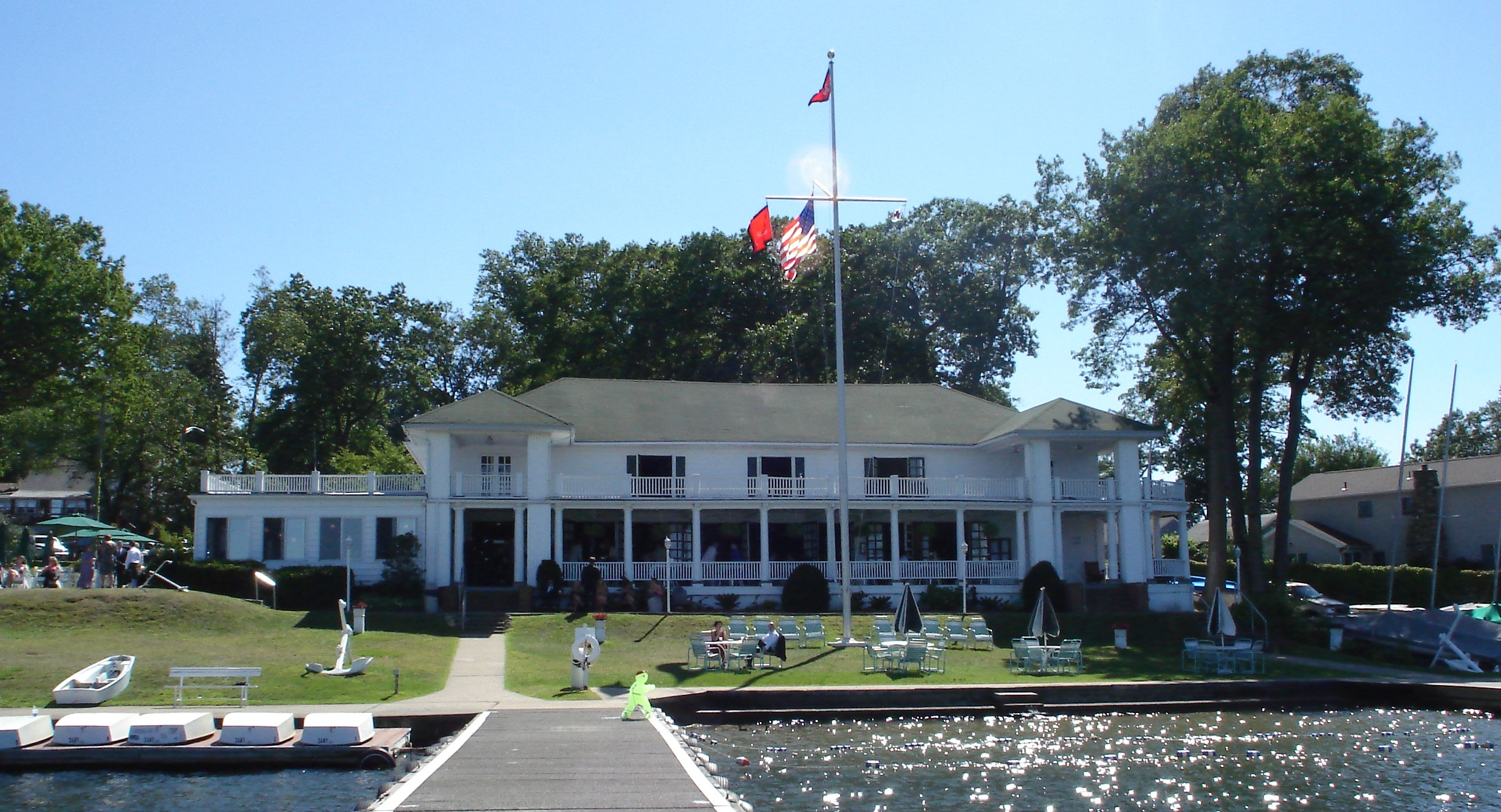
- Lake Hopatcong Yacht Club

- Location within Morris County, New Jersey Location within New Jersey Location within the United States
- Location: North Bertrand Road and Willow Street, Mount Arlington, New Jersey
- Area: 1.8 acres (0.73 ha)
- Architect: Pilcher, Lewis Frederick
- Architectural style: Colonial Revival, Adirondack
- NRHP reference No.: 99000904
- Added to NRHP: August 12, 1999

The clubhouse was built in the Adirondack style, using local logs. The exterior is white; the "great hall" interior displays the Adirondack architecture with dark woodwork, decorated in a nautical motif with the photographs of all past commodores adorning the walls. There is a large porch used for dining and gatherings that overlooks the lake.

The Clubhouse structure is on the National and New Jersey registers of historic places. The LHYC Historical Foundation exists to support the maintenance and restoration of the historical building.

== Racing ==
The club's sailing program includes a junior sailing instructional and racing program, as well as one-design racing in several fleets: E-Scow, Star, Thistle, and A-Class. The club has a youth program, called "The Juniors", and holds a variety of social affairs for all ages. The club offers instructional programs that are open to the public.

== Social life ==
The social schedule includes a variety of Saturday night functions throughout the Spring and Summer. The club hosts the annual boat show for the Lake Hopactong Antique and Classic Boat Society which has been going on for over 30 years.

== See also ==
- National Register of Historic Places listings in Morris County, New Jersey
