= Morris County Traction Company =

Trolley service in downtown Dover, New Jersey

The Morris County Traction Company was a public transit company that began trolley service in downtown Dover, New Jersey in July 1904. It was expanded over the years until the system was completed in 1914 to Newark, New Jersey. Service lasted until 1928.

== Routes and service ==
According to records, service was provided to: Bertrand Island Amusement Park at Lake Hopatcong, Ledgewood, Succasunna, Kenvil, Mine Hill, Dover, Wharton, Rockaway Borough, Denville, Mountain Lakes, Boonton, Morris Plains (including Greystone Park Psychiatric Hospital), Morristown, Madison, Chatham, Summit, Irvington, Elizabeth, and Newark, a distance of about 75 miles.

The line ran on both exclusive right-of-way streets and on city streets, some of which, such as Broad Street in Summit, were designed and built to accommodate the trolley line. The power house for the trolley was located along the Passaic River in Summit, on the border of Chatham, New Jersey.

Between 1926 and 1928, after private automobiles became more prominent on the roads, the trolley lines were replaced by buses.

== Modern remnants ==
Although the bulk of the trolley lines were removed in the decades since its closure, some remnants remain. For example:

• A two-mile portion of the former Morris County Traction Company trolley line, along New Jersey Transit's Morris and Essex line in Morris Township, New Jersey, now serves as a bike and walking trail called the Traction Line Recreation Trail, under the supervision of the Morris County Park System.

• In Union, a portion of the line forked off of Morris Avenue. Part of the right of way and partial grading is very noticeable behind Holy Spirit Church. Huguenot Avenue and Euclid Avenues have the same compass orientation as this portion of the line.

• The Summit car barn was still in existence as of November 2008. The building was located on River Road in Summit, just north of the intersection with Chatham Road. A turntable was visible between the Passaic River and the building. The building, then vacant, had been a car dealership, and earlier, a Public Service Coordinated Transport bus servicing facility for the number 70 and 72 routes. These routes replaced the MCTC lines when PS assumed the routes in the late 1920s.

• The bridge over the Passaic River between Chatham and Summit is gone, but the piers still stand in the river.

• The Dover NJ car barn is still in use as a facility for Lakeland Bus Lines.

• In Mountain Lakes the right-of-way is used as a paved cycle and walking path. It is located along the left side of Boulevard between Boonton and Route 46.

== See also ==
- List of New Jersey street railroads
