= Hudson Maxim =

American chemist and inventor (1853–1927)

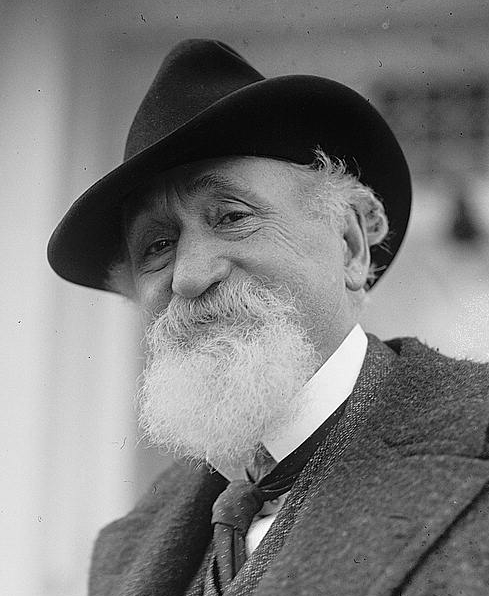
- Maxim in 1922
- Born: February 3, 1853; Orneville, Maine, U.S.
- Died: May 6, 1927 (aged 74); Landing, New Jersey, U.S.
- Occupations: Chemist; inventor
- Known for: Innovating smokeless powder
- Relatives: Hiram Maxim (brother); Hiram Percy Maxim (nephew)

Hudson Maxim (February 3, 1853 – May 6, 1927), was an American chemist and inventor who invented a variety of explosives, including an improved variant of smokeless powder. Thomas Edison referred to him as "the most versatile man in America". He was the brother of Hiram Maxim, the inventor of the Maxim gun, and the uncle of Hiram Percy Maxim, the inventor of the first commercially successful silencer.

== Life and career ==
Hudson Maxim was born on February 3, 1853, in Orneville, Maine. Maxim started his career in 1881 as the publisher of Real Pen Work - Self Instructor in Penmanship, a book addressing the arts of calligraphy and penmanship, and the sale of special inks, pens, and other supplies related to penmanship. Later he joined his brother Hiram Stevens Maxim's workshop in the United Kingdom, where they both worked on the improvement of smokeless gunpowder. After some disputes, Hudson Maxim returned to the United States, where he received the first American patent for smokeless powder in 1889 and founded the Columbia Powder Manufacturing Company in 1891. He sold the company to E. I. du Pont de Nemours and Company in 1897 and went on to develop Maximite, a high explosive stable enough to pass through armor plate before detonating. Around 1900, DuPont, which operated powder works at Lake Hopatcong, built a laboratory for him at Landing, New Jersey.

Maxim wrote a book, Defenseless America, published in 1915, in which he pointed out the inferiority of the American defense system and the vulnerability of the country against attacks of foreign aggressors. At that time, the United States army according to Maxim, had a total strength of 81,000 men of which 29,000 were assigned to man coastal artillery batteries at major ports. This explains the need for the United States to use National Guard troops in its campaign against Mexico in 1916. The book was reissued in 1916 after his good friend, Elbert Hubbard, died on the RMS Lusitania when it was torpedoed by a German submarine. This event fueled his belief that the USA should improve its defenses and join the war against Germany on the side of the Entente.

Maxim also wrote the book The Science of Poetry and the Philosophy of Language about the nature and writing of poetry. In this work, he contended that words, like chemical particles, had natural laws that governed the manner in which they could be combined into verse, and that poetry perceived as excellent was in fact one that conformed to those laws. He also argued that certain famous poets (William Shakespeare, William Wordsworth) had discovered those laws and put them to use in their poetry.

During his experimental career, he lost his left hand in a mercury fulminate explosion in 1894.

== Personal life and death ==
During the last 25 years of his life, Maxim spent most of his time at his home on the shores of Lake Hopatcong, New Jersey, where by the 1910s he owned about 600 acres, making him the largest landholder on the lake. In 1912 he built Maxim Drive, a shoreline road nearly two miles long across his property. As traffic on the Morris Canal collapsed, the state considered turning the lake into a water-supply reservoir for Newark and Jersey City, which would have ended swimming, boating, and fishing there. Maxim opposed the plan in a 1913 pamphlet, Lake Hopatcong the Beautiful, and around 1920 became the driving figure and largest shareholder in the Lake Hopatcong Corporation, which bought up colonial-era title to the lake bed (the "Niles Rights") to block a state takeover. Once the reservoir threat passed, the corporation gave up the rights and dissolved, leaving the lake open to the public. He is honored by memorials in Hopatcong State Park and the Borough of Hopatcong's Maxim Glen Park. He spoke and wrote prolifically on many topics—from his opposition to maintaining the Morris Canal, to his disdain of Prohibition, to his love of poetry and boxing.

Maxim appeared as King Neptune during the first two years of the Miss America Pageant in 1921 and 1922, arriving on a great float and presenting the trophy to the winner.

He was an important member of the College of Fellows of the Academy of Nations.

Hudson Maxim died on May 6, 1927, in Landing, New Jersey, at the age of 74.

== Bibliography ==
- Man's Machine-Made Millennium, future-predicting article in Cosmopolitan, Vol. 45, No. 6, November 1908, pag. 568, illustrated by William R. Leigh.
- The Science of Poetry and The Philosophy of Language. By Hudson Maxim, Funk & Wagnalls Company, 1910.
- Lake Hopatcong the Beautiful. By Hudson Maxim, The McConnell Printing Co., New York, New York, 1913.
- Defenseless America. By Hudson Maxim, Hearst's International Library Co. 1915.
- Dynamite Stories. By Hudson Maxim, Hearst's International Library Co. 1916.
- The Science of Poetry and the Philosophy of Language By Hudson Maxim Funk and Wagnalls Company, New York
- Leading Opinions Both For and Against National Defense. Compiled by Hudson Maxim, Hearst's International Library Co., 1916
- Hudson Maxim, Reminiscences and Comments. By Clifton Johnson, Doubleday, Page & Company, 1924.
