= Raccoon Island =

Raccoon Island may refer to:

- Raccoon Island (Massachusetts)
- Raccoon Island (New Jersey)
- Raccoon Island (Ohio)
