= Cicchetti (surname) =

Cicchetti is an Italian surname. Notable people with the surname include:

- Antonio Cicchetti (born 1952), Italian politician
- Charles Cicchetti, American professor of economics
- Dante Cicchetti, American psychologist
- Joseph J. Cicchetti (1923–1945), American soldier
- Marco Cicchetti (born 1999), Italian para athlete
