= Asante Gist =

American basketball player (born 1997)

Free agent
- Position: Point guard

Personal information
- Born: January 20, 1997 (age 29)
- Listed height: 5 ft 11 in (1.80 m)
- Listed weight: 185 lb (84 kg)

Career information
- High school: Roselle Catholic (Roselle, New Jersey); Marist (Bayonne, New Jersey); St. Anthony (Jersey City, New Jersey)
- College: Eastern Kentucky (2016–2018); Iona (2018–2021)
- NBA draft: 2021: undrafted
- Playing career: 2021–present

Career history
- 2021–2022: Maine Celtics

Career highlights
- MAAC tournament MVP (2021); OVC All-Newcomer Team (2017)

Asante Jamar Gist (born January 20, 1997) is an American professional basketball player who last played for the Maine Celtics of the NBA G League. He played college basketball for the Eastern Kentucky Colonels and the Iona Gaels.

== High school career ==
Raised in East Orange, New Jersey, Gist began his high school career at Roselle Catholic High School and won the NJSIAA Tournament of Champions as a freshman. For his junior season, he transferred to Marist High School due to the emergence of Isaiah Briscoe. Gist averaged 14.8 points per game in 13 games. He transferred to St. Anthony High School for his senior season. Gist helped lead the Friars to a 32–0 record and a victory in the Tournament of Champions. He scored 16 points in the title game against Linden High School. In November 2015, Gist committed to playing college basketball for Eastern Kentucky over offers from Miami (Florida) and UCF in large part because of the recruiting pitch of coach Dan McHale.

== College career ==
As a freshman, Gist averaged 15.9 points and 3.8 assists per game. He suffered from a right ankle injury and played in six games as a sophomore, averaging eight points and 2.7 assists per game. On January 18, 2018, Gist transferred to Iona and received a waiver from the NCAA for eligibility in December. As a junior, he averaged 12.5 points and 2.4 rebounds per game. Gist appeared in 15 games as a redshirt junior before missing the rest of the season with an injury. He averaged 10.1 points, 2.2 rebounds and 2.6 assists per game. Gist was limited by surgery on his finger and a debilitating back injury during his senior season. He helped Iona win the 2021 MAAC tournament, earning MVP honors after scoring 18 points in the title game against Fairfield, and reach the NCAA Tournament. Gist averaged 13.4 points and 3.6 assists per game. He was named to the Second Team All-Met by the Met Basketball Writers Association.

== Professional career ==
Gist played for the Washington Wizards in the 2021 NBA Summer League and was selected in the third round of the 2021 NBA G League draft by the Westchester Knicks. He was waived on December 2, 2021, before appearing in a game. On December 17, Gist was acquired by the Maine Celtics and scored 11 points in his debut in a 111–99 win against the Long Island Nets. He was waived on February 1, 2022. Gist was re-acquired by the team on February 21. Gist was then later waived on February 28, 2022.

== Career statistics ==
Legend
GP	Games played	GS	Games started	MPG	Minutes per game
FG%	Field goal percentage	3P%	3-point field goal percentage	FT%	Free throw percentage
RPG	Rebounds per game	APG	Assists per game	SPG	Steals per game
BPG	Blocks per game	PPG	Points per game	**Bold**	Career high

=== College ===
Year	Team	GP	GS	MPG	FG%	3P%	FT%	RPG	APG	SPG	BPG	PPG
2016–17	Eastern Kentucky	31	**29**	**31.8**	.374	.339	.735	2.5	**3.8**	**.9**	.0	**15.9**
2017–18	Eastern Kentucky	6	5	27.5	.309	**.389**	.467	**3.0**	2.7	.5	.0	8.0
2018–19	Iona	**33**	20	29.6	**.408**	.360	.784	2.4	2.3	.6	.0	12.5
2019–20	Iona	15	13	29.7	.383	.359	.700	2.2	2.6	.5	**.1**	10.1
2020–21	Iona	16	14	29.3	.349	.333	**.892**	2.0	3.6	.8	**.1**	13.4
Career		101	81	30.1	.378	.350	.769	2.4	3.0	.7	.0	13.1

== Personal life ==
His uncle KayGee is a member of hip-hop group Naughty by Nature and his father James served as KayGee's road manager before managing other artists such as Jaheim.
