= Convent Station =

Convent Station could refer to:

- Convent Station, New Jersey, an unincorporated community in Morris Township, New Jersey
- Convent Station (NJ Transit), an NJ Transit rail station on the Morristown Line
