= Marist High School (Bayonne, New Jersey) =

Private high school in Hudson County, New Jersey, US

Location
- 1241 Kennedy Boulevard; Bayonne, (Hudson County), New Jersey 07002; United States; 40°41′26″N 74°6′22″W

Information
- Type: Private, Coeducational
- Religious affiliations: Roman Catholic, Marist Brothers
- Established: 1954
- Closed: 2020
- NCES School ID: 00861627
- President: Peter G. Kane
- Faculty: 24 FTEs
- Grades: 9–12
- Enrollment: 309 (as of 2017–18)
- Student to teacher ratio: 12.9:1
- Colors: Royal blue Gold; White
- Athletics conference: Hudson County Interscholastic League
- Team name: Royal Knights / Lady Knights
- Accreditation: Middle States Association of Colleges and Schools
- Yearbook: The Lance
- Tuition: $9,150 (2015-16)
- Website: www.marist.org

Marist High School was a private Roman Catholic co-educational college preparatory secondary school located in Bayonne, New Jersey, United States, and operated by the Marist Brothers of the Schools, an international religious congregation of educators with schools in over 70 countries. It was located within the Roman Catholic Archdiocese of Newark. The school had been accredited by the Middle States Association of Colleges and Schools Commission on Elementary and Secondary Schools since 1978.

As of the 2017–18 school year, the school had an enrollment of 309 students and 24 classroom teachers (on an FTE basis), for a student–teacher ratio of 12.9:1. The school's student body was 42.4% (131) Black, 20.7% (64) Asian, 16.5% (51) White, 13.9% (43) Hispanic and 5.5% (17) two or more races.

Despite plans to convert it into a middle school and sports complex, the school was demolished in 2022 due to a lack of funds for lead and asbestos remediation.

== History ==
Marist opened its doors in September 1954, with Brother Leo Sylvius serving as the school's first principal. In 1962, the present campus was acquired to accommodate the school's growth after negotiations led by Brother Leo to acquire land owned by the City of Bayonne, and on April 23, 1964, ground was broken for a new building which would tie together existing buildings on the campus. A modern structure was constructed with 24 classrooms, lecture rooms and laboratories for physics, chemistry, biology and earth science, an art studio, a computer center, and a weight room. A library with a complete audio-visual department, a guidance complex with a career resource center, together with a large gymnasium-auditorium complex and cafeteria were also included as part of the new school building. In 1977, additional land was acquired for expanding the school's athletic facilities. In 1995, an athletic field was built in back of the school.

In 1986, Marist began admitting women and became a co-educational high school. Students from throughout Hudson and Essex counties and the surrounding metropolitan area attend the school. Marist was established primarily for Catholic students.

In 2008 the school's enrollment began decreasing in a manner described by Caitlin Mota of The Jersey Journal as "steadily", and by 2017 9th grade student enrollment was down about 50% from the beginning of the decrease. In March 2017 the school stated that it could potentially close if $1.5 million was not raised in donations to keep the school open. The deadline for the task was April 24. In April the Marist Brothers stated that it would be open for the 2017–2018 school year. This was despite the fact only $750,000 had been raised by the deadline. In December the organization would continue to keep it open by any means possible; the organization decided back in April that it had been unable to keep funding the school.

The school announced in January 2020 that it would close at the end of the 2019–20 school year due to deficits that had risen to $1 million and enrollment that had declined by 50% since 2008.

== Athletics ==
The Marist High School Royal Knights / Lady Knights competed in the Hudson County Interscholastic League, which is comprised of public and private high schools in Hudson County, and operates under the supervision of the New Jersey State Interscholastic Athletic Association (NJSIAA). With 271 students in grades 10–12, the school was classified by the NJSIAA for the 2019–20 school year as Non-Public B for most athletic competition purposes, which included schools with an enrollment of 37 to 366 students in that grade range (equivalent to Group I for public schools).

The 1994 football team, led by coach Gene Pagnozzi, won the NJSIAA Non-Public Group II state sectional title with a 16–13 victory against Gloucester Catholic High School in the championship game played at Giants Stadium. The team won three consecutive county championships from 1991 to 1993 and went to four straight sectional championship games from 1993 to 1996.

The girls' basketball team won the Non-Public Group B state championship in 2001, defeating Sacred Heart High School in the tournament final. During his 19 seasons, girls basketball coach Bill Defazio won four sectional titles, including in 2008 against Gill St. Bernard's School in the finals of Non-Public B North B tournament.

The boys basketball team won the Non-Public Group B state championship in 1992, defeating Eustace Preparatory School in the finals. Former coach Mike Leonardo had a 209–46 record; 20 players under Leonardo received a Division I scholarships.

== Champagnat Scholars Program ==
Marist High School is known for their Champagnat Scholars Program (CSP). This program is for very gifted and academically inclined students. Students (in as early as their Freshman Year) can obtain college credits by taking Advanced Placement classes offered at Marist. Currently, there are about 30 students in CSP.

== Notable alumni ==
- Joe Borowski (born 1971), professional baseball player for the Cleveland Indians
- Charles Cicchetti (born 1943), economist
- Thomas B. Considine (class of 1982), former Commissioner of the New Jersey Department of Banking and Insurance
- Joseph Doria (born 1946), politician who served in the New Jersey General Assembly and New Jersey Senate, and as the mayor of Bayonne
- William P. Fitzpatrick (1940–1975), politician who represented the 10th legislative district in the New Jersey General Assembly from 1974 until his death
- Asante Gist (born 1997), professional basketball player for the Maine Celtics of the NBA G League
- Tony Longo (1958–2015), actor
- George R. R. Martin (born 1948), author best known for his horror and fantasy works
- Ed Murphy (born 1956), basketball player who played professionally in Europe
- Manny Suárez (born 1993), basketball player who has competed internationally on the Chile national team

== Notable faculty ==
- Larry Arico (born 1969), former college football head coach
