= Larry Arico =

American football player and coach (born 1969)

Biographical details
- Born: December 21, 1969 (age 56)

Playing career
- 1988–1991: Lehigh

Coaching career (HC unless noted)
- 1997–1999: Fairleigh Dickinson–Florham
- 2000–2004: William Paterson
- 2005–2011: Marist HS (NJ)

Head coaching record
- Overall: 16–64 (college)

Laurence Andre Arico (born December 21, 1969) is an American former football coach. He served as the head football coach at Fairleigh Dickinson University–Florham (FDU) from 1997 to 1999 and William Paterson University (WPU) from 2000 to 2004, compiling a career college football coaching record of an overall record of 16–64. Arico was the athletic director and football coach at Marist High School in Bayonne, New Jersey.

Arico is the husband of Kim Barnes Arico, the head women's basketball coach at the University of Michigan.

Arico grew up in Mount Arlington, New Jersey and attended Pope John XXIII Regional High School in Sparta, New Jersey, where he played football, basketball and ran track. He attended Lehigh University and was a four-year varsity letter winner in football at Lehigh University as a running back.

Arico was a resident of Teaneck, New Jersey while coaching at William Paterson and has since been a resident of Glen Rock, New Jersey.

== Head coaching record ==
=== College ===
Year	Team	Overall	Conference	Standing	Bowl/playoffs
Fairleigh Dickinson–Florham Devils (Middle Atlantic Conference) (1997–1999)
1997	Fairleigh Dickinson–Florham	0–10	0–4	5th (Freedom)	
1998	Fairleigh Dickinson–Florham	2–8	1–3	4th (Freedom)	
1999	Fairleigh Dickinson–Florham	5–6	2–2	3rd (Freedom)	L ECAC Southeast
Fairleigh Dickinson–Florham:		7–24	3–9		
William Paterson Pioneers (New Jersey Athletic Conference) (2000–2004)
2000	William Paterson	2–8	1–5	6th	
2001	William Paterson	3–7	2–4	5th	
2002	William Paterson	1–9	0–6	7th	
2003	William Paterson	1–9	0–5	6th	
2004	William Paterson	2–8	1–5	T–6th	
William Paterson:		9–41	4–25		
Total:		16–65			
