= Traction Line Recreation Trail =

Rail trail in New Jersey, United States

Coordinates: 40.776996°N 74.439967°W

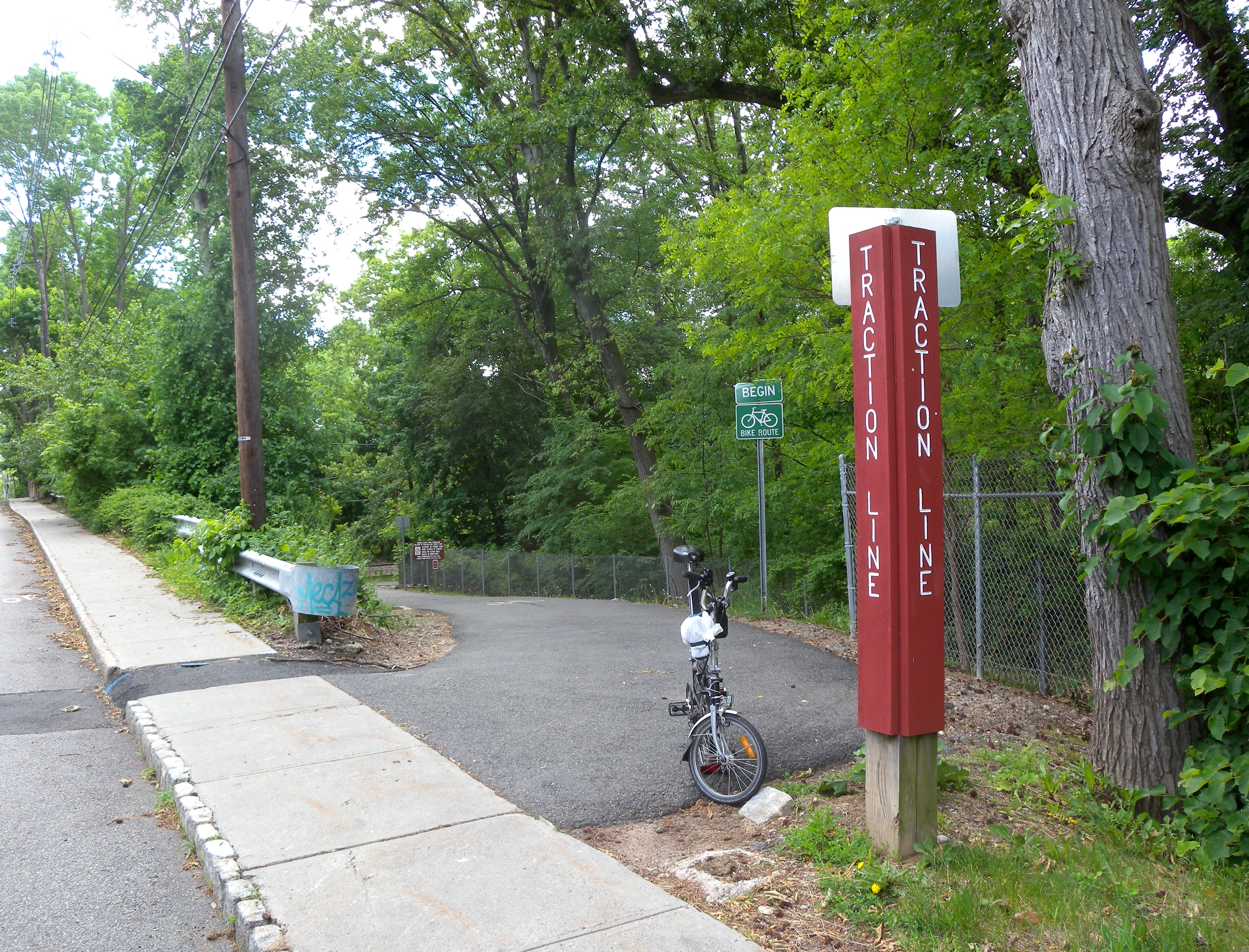
South end trailhead on Danforth Road near the Dreyfuss Road entrance to Fairleigh Dickinson University. 40°46'18.4"N 74°25'44.3"W

The Traction Line Recreation Trail is a multi-use paved asphalt rail trail located in Morristown, New Jersey.

This 2.7-mile (4.3 km) trail uses a rail corridor which was built for the Morris County Traction Company trolley line, which runs alongside New Jersey Transit's Morris & Essex Lines in Morris Township, New Jersey.

The trail is maintained by the Morris County Park Commission.

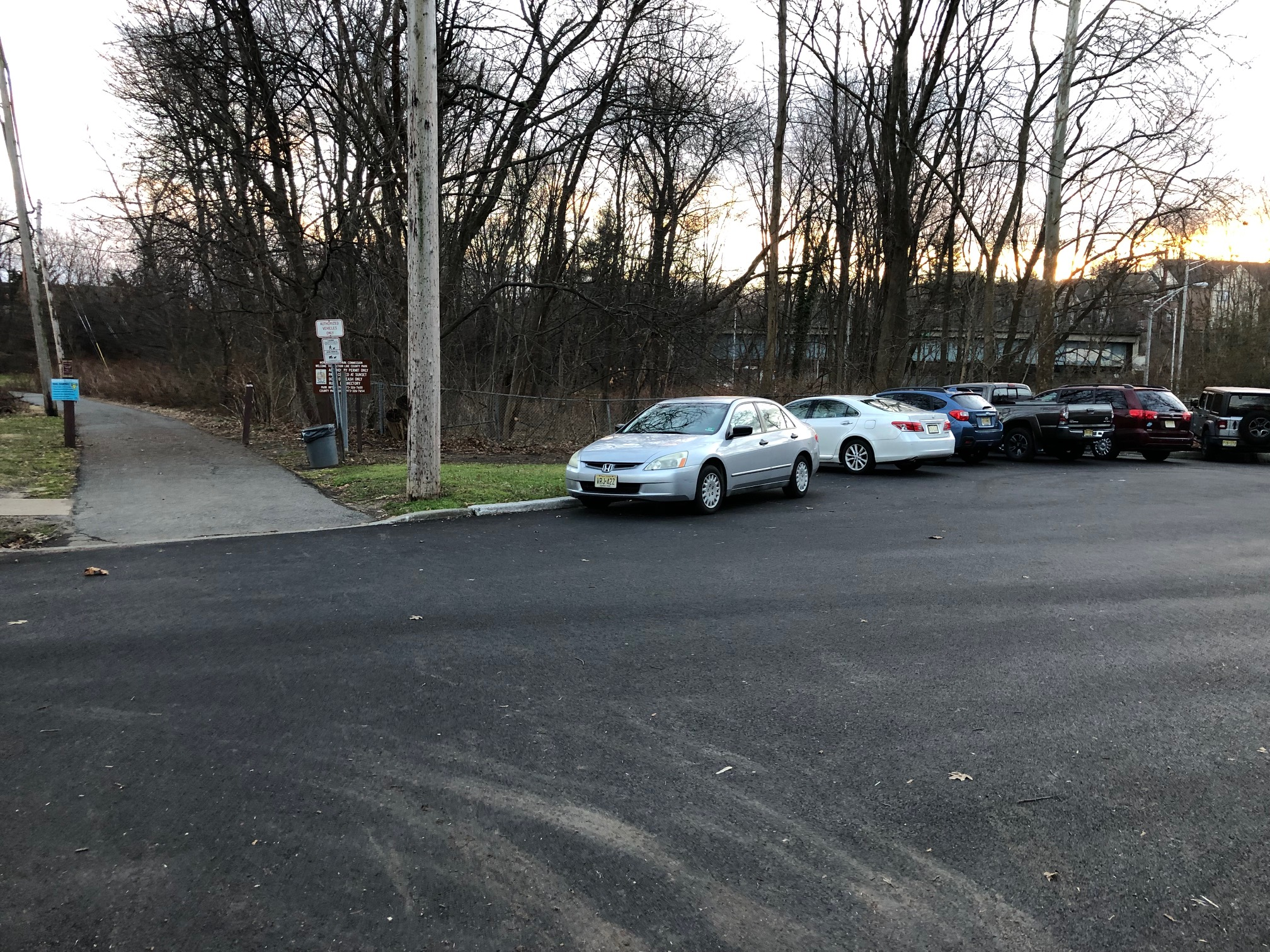
Traction Line Recreation Trail North Trailhead located on Howell Place in Morristown, New Jersey with a small parking lot. Photo taken at 40°47'40.7"N 74°28'02.8"W facing south.

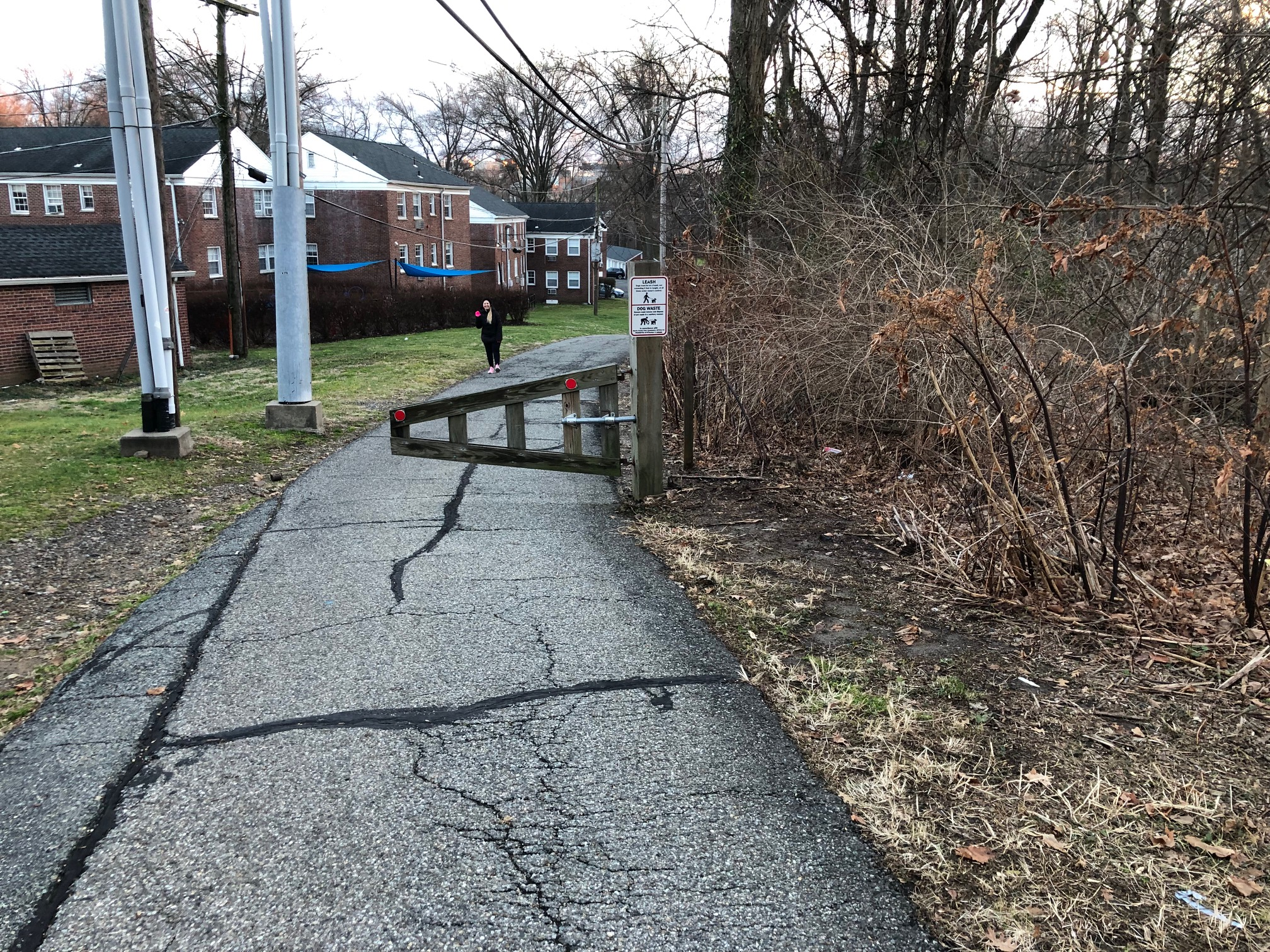
Traction Line Recreation Trail North Trailhead located on Morris Avenue in Morristown, New Jersey. Photo taken at 40°47'44.3"N 74°28'02.5"W facing south.

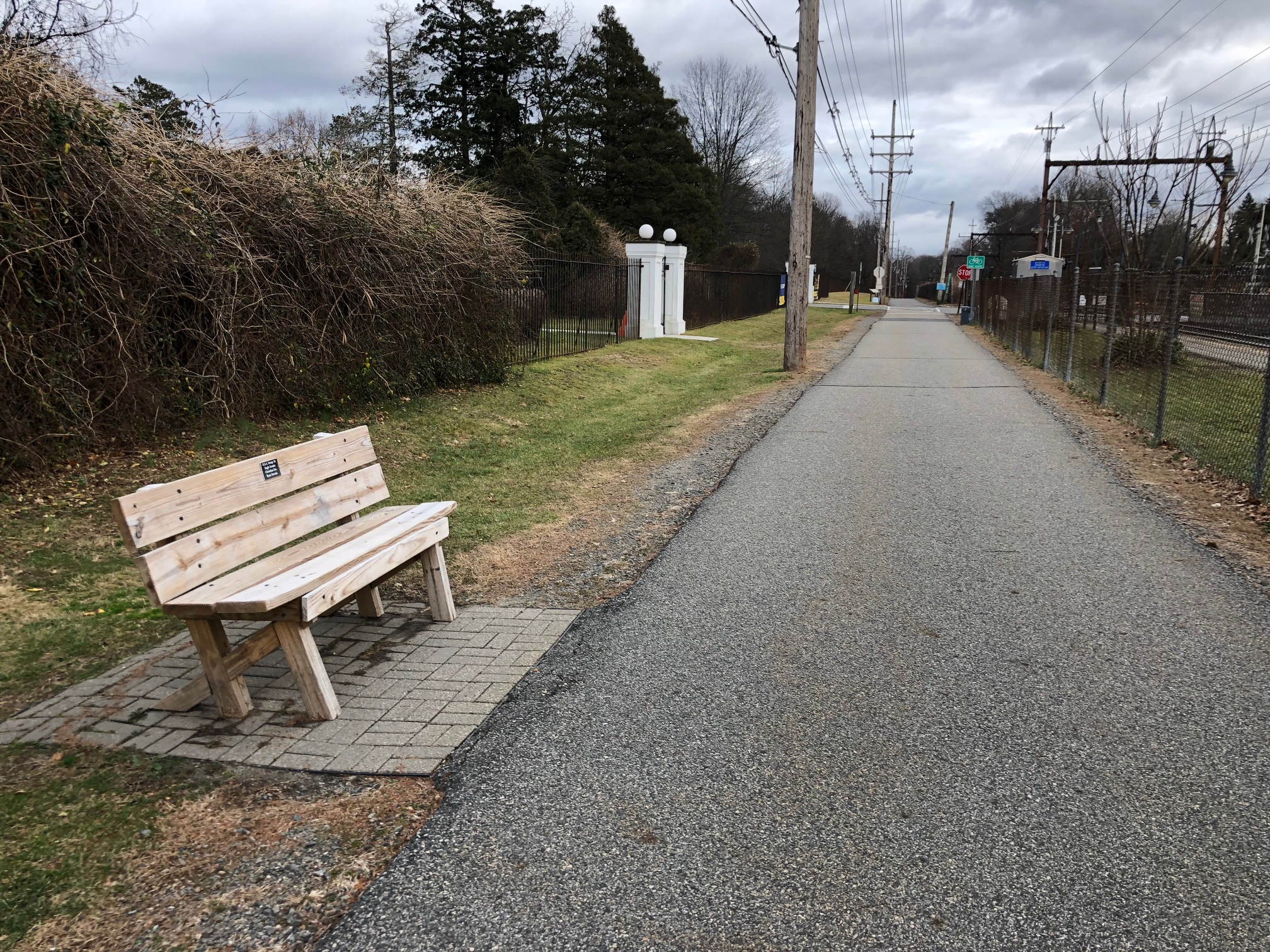
Benches can be found along the trail near Convent Station. Photo taken at 40°46'45.0"N 74°26'36.1"W facing south.

The southern trailhead can be found along Danforth Road in Florham Park, New Jersey. One northern trailhead exists along Howell Place in Morristown, New Jersey where there is a small trail parking lot. Approximately 100m further north is another trailhead on Morris Ave in Morristown across the road from the Morristown National Historical Park. There are no bathroom facilities along the trail though there are a few benches near Convent Station constructed by Christian Fox and Ryan Servais as their Eagle Scout project for Boy Scout Troop 34.

== Proposed expansion ==
In 2012 the Morris County Park Commission proposed extending the trail an additional 0.6 miles south from its current trailhead on Dreyfuss Rd in Florham Park to Elm Street in Madison. Despite the proposal receiving a majority support from the public, with the hopes of bringing additional bicyclists to Madison's downtown, the Madison Borough Council unanimously voted the proposal down with all Republican candidates for Madison town council signing onto a statement opposing the extension. As of 2023 the trail extension has not been built.

== Landmarks along the trail ==
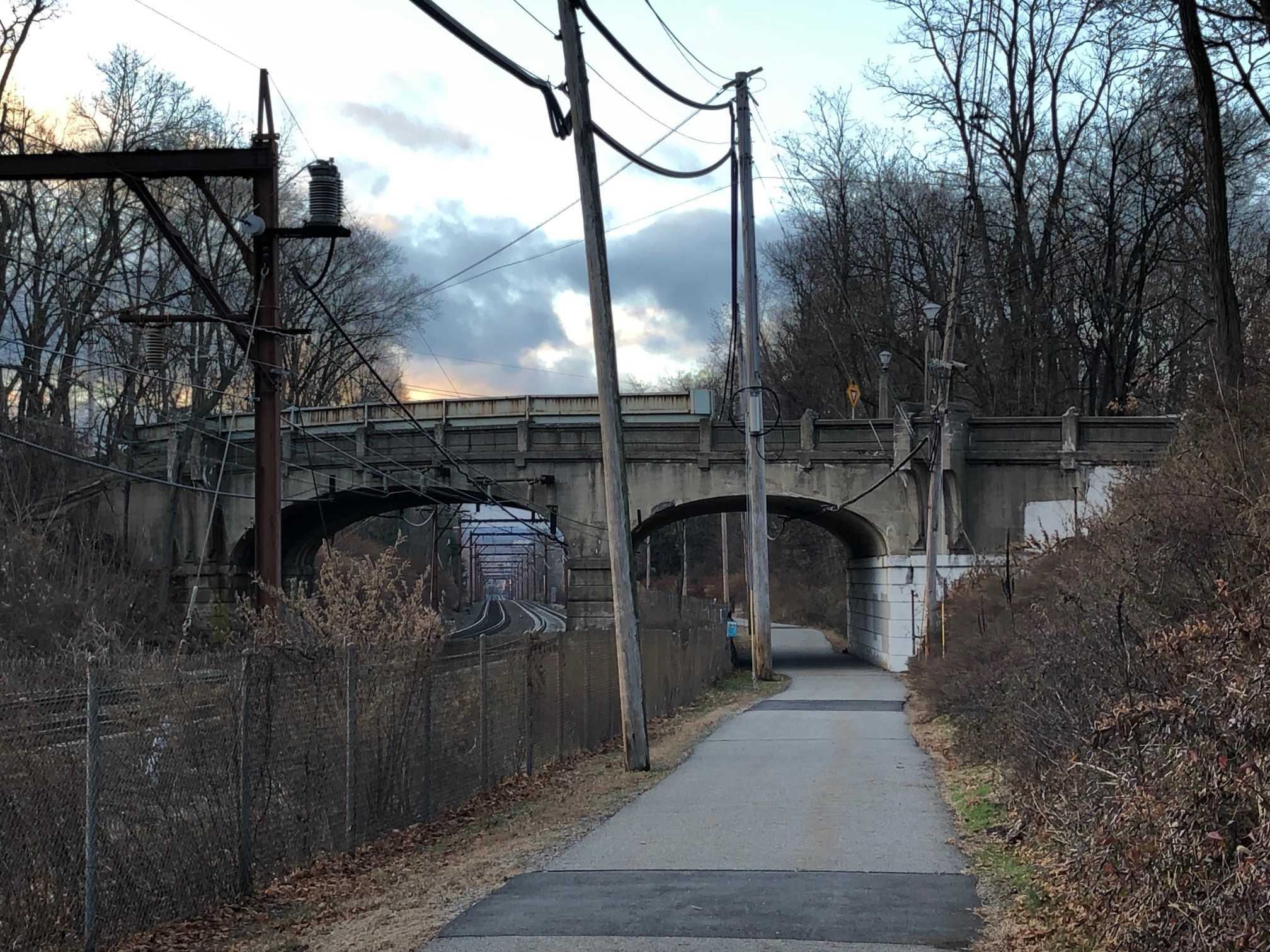
The Traction Line Recreation Trail passes under Normandy Parkway at this concrete bridge constructed in 1914. Photo taken at 40°47'21.7"N 74°27'21.1"W facing west.

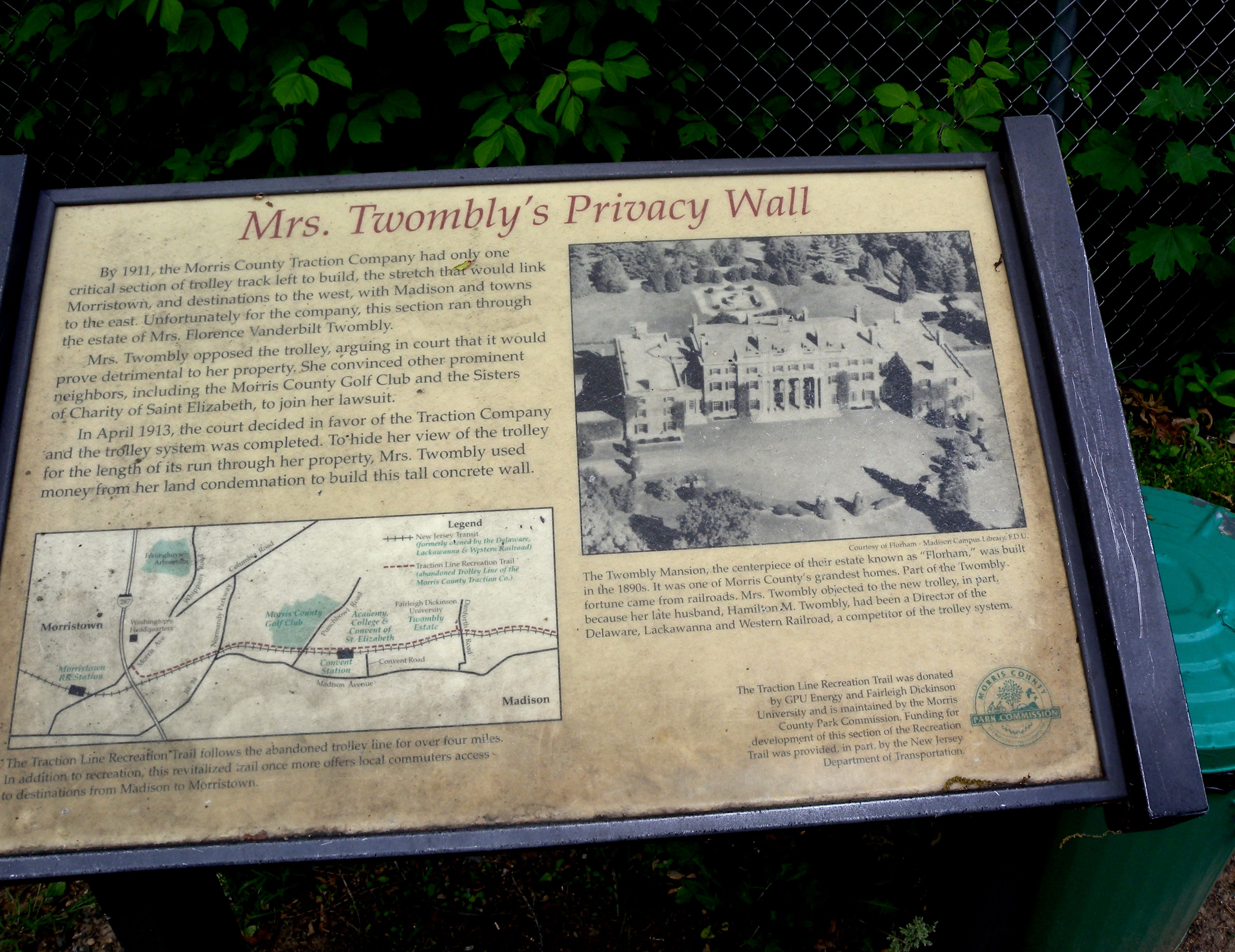
Morris County Parks Commission Historical Marker for Mrs. Twombly's Privacy Wall.

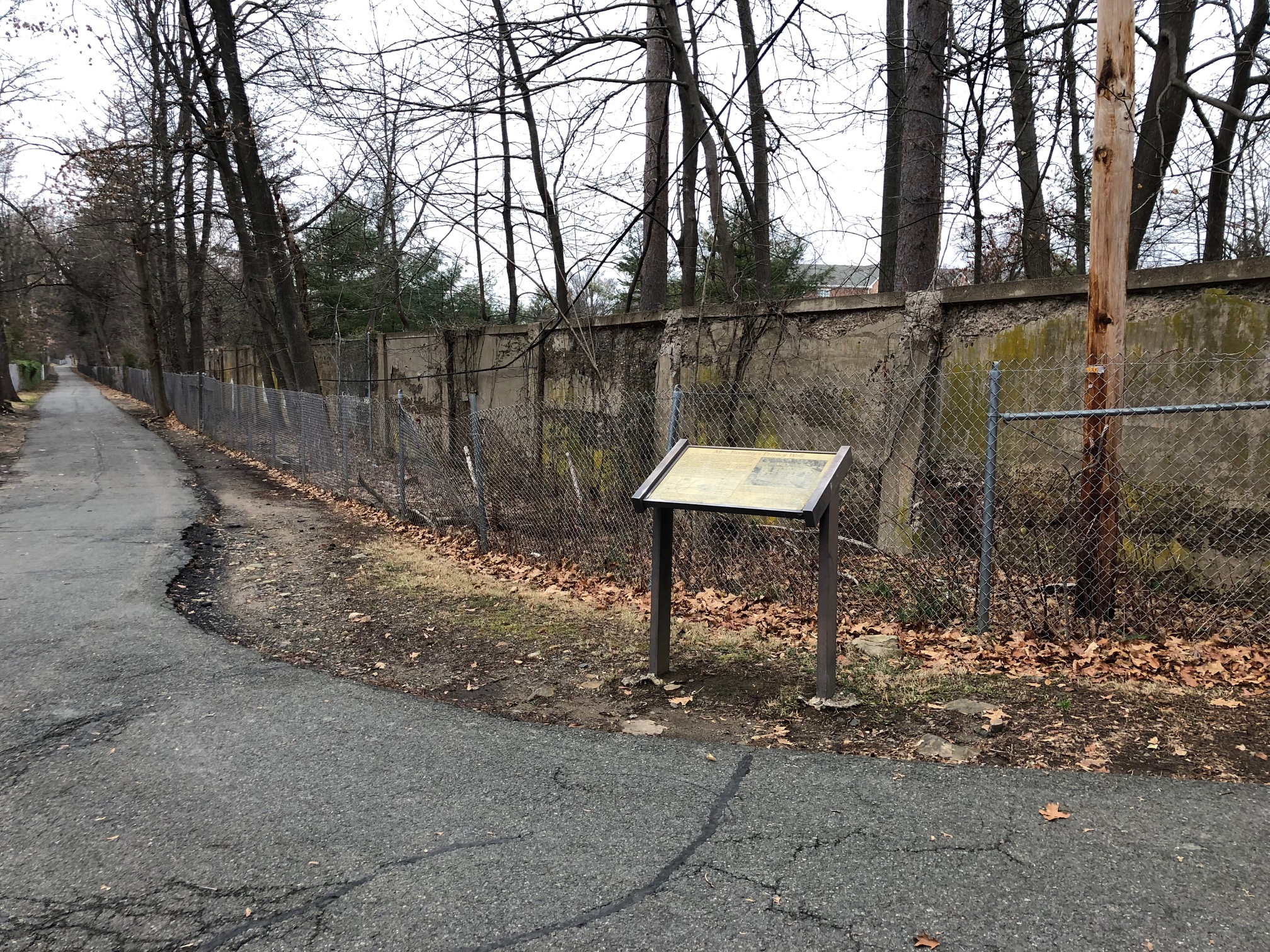
Mrs. Twombly's Privacy Wall can be seen along the southern end of the Traction Line Recreation Trail separating the trail from Fairleigh Dickinson University. Photo taken at 40°46'17.4"N 74°25'46.5"W facing north.

Approximately 0.8 miles from the northern trailhead the trail passes under Normandy Parkway which runs down the center of Normandy Park Historic District. The concrete bridge, first referred to as Sneeden Bridge (Sneeden's Bridge) or Sneeden's Crossing after Normandy Park resident John Sneeden in a 1922 article, was constructed in 1914 and contains Art Deco features to make it aesthetically pleasing to the residents of Normandy Park. Though the exact design of the bridge was contested for years by the residents. The bridge replaced a railroad crossing with gates the residents had argued was unsafe.

Convent Station first built in 1867 with the current brick building constructed from 1913 to 1914 can be found approximately 1.7 miles from the northern trailhead.

At the southern end of the trail an old concrete wall separates the trail from Fairleigh Dickinson University. Known as Mrs. Twombly's Privacy Wall, it was constructed by Florence Adele Vanderbilt Twombly in 1913 to shield her from the view of the passing trolleys after she lost a court battle opposing the creation of the trolley line on her Florham Estate.
