= Bertrand Island, New Jersey =

Coordinates: 40°55′29.6″N 74°38′47.2″W

Bertrand Island, New Jersey, is a small peninsula in Lake Hopatcong, part of the community of Mount Arlington. It is best known as the former site of the Bertrand Island Amusement Park which existed from prior to World War I as a picnic ground to 1983, as well as being the place of origin for Bette Cooper, Miss America 1937.

In 1925, Bertland Island gained popularity as it offered 20 rides, including a rollercoaster and boardwalk games. As the Great Depression hit, Lake Hopatcong's main tourism industry also took a hit. In addition, the creation of electric refrigeration, which was the lake's second-largest industry, also collapsed in 1938. It marked the end of the hotel period.

It is shaped somewhat like a spoon. On the "handle" part there are many upper-class condominiums, built in 2001. Where it gets wide and rounds out is a normal residential area. There is a boating club at the tip of the peninsula. Lake Hopatcong is rather visible from nearly everywhere on Bertrand Island.

Scenes from Woody Allen's 1985 film The Purple Rose of Cairo were filmed on the site. A number of the scenes featuring Tom and Cecilia are set at the Amusement Park, which closed just prior to the film's production. Lake Hopatcong is easily seen in the background.

== See also ==
- Bertrand Island Amusement Park
