= Raccoon Island (New Jersey) =

Island in Morris County, New Jersey, United States

Coordinates: 40°57′45″N 74°38′12″W

Raccoon Island is a 50-acre (20 ha) island on Lake Hopatcong in Jefferson Township, in Morris County, New Jersey. There is no public land on the island, which is divided into private lots.

From April to October, a ferry provides access to the island by car or light truck. Few people live year-round on the island, but during the summer months many families from the surrounding area temporarily move and commute to their work from there. The homes range from small cottages that were built from the 1880s onwards to more contemporary and remodeled homes with sizable lots.

In the late 19th century, paddle-wheel boats brought people from nearby railway stations to resort hotels and campsites on the island. It was a summer tourist destination for New York City residents (45 miles (72 km) east) before expanded auto and boat transportation made more exotic travel feasible.

After development began in the 1880s, the Chincopee Bridge was built to connect the island with the mainland in 1891, but it collapsed in 1899. A new bridge was planned and approved in 1928, but the Great Depression halted that project. In 1932, the ferry service was started from Chincopee Road.
