= Charles Cicchetti =

American economist

Charles Joseph Cicchetti (July 31, 1943 – November 19, 2025) was an American economist.

== Education ==
Raised in Jersey City, Cicchetti graduated in 1962 from Marist High School, where he competed in baseball, basketball and track. He received an appointment to the Air Force Academy from Congressman Neil Gallagher.

Cicchetti studied at the United States Air Force Academy from 1961 to 1964 and received a bachelor's degree in economics from Colorado College in 1965. He received a PhD in economics from Rutgers University in 1969.

== Career ==
Cicchetti was a founding member of Pacific Economics Group and a senior advisor to Pacific Economics Group Research. Previously, Cicchetti was the Jeffrey J. Miller Professor of Government, Business, and the Economy at the University of Southern California; a managing director of Arthur Andersen Economic Consulting; a co-chairman of Putnam, Hayes & Bartlett, and a deputy director of the Energy and Environmental Policy Center at Harvard University's John F. Kennedy School of Government. From January 2017 to December 2020, he was a managing director at Berkeley Research Group.

== 2020 election lawsuit ==
Following the victory of Joe Biden over Donald Trump in the 2020 United States presidential election, Texas filed a lawsuit (Texas v. Pennsylvania, 2020) to prevent Pennsylvania, Georgia, Wisconsin, and Michigan (all states won by Biden) from certifying their electors for Biden. Cicchetti, who was a donor to Donald Trump's 2016 campaign, filed a declaration supporting Texas in the lawsuit. In the declaration, Cicchetti claimed that, given Trump's lead in the popular vote count in those states on election night, the probability of Biden winning the state would be "one in a quadrillion". He based his analysis on the erroneous assumption that votes are evenly and randomly distributed among geographic regions, demographics, and voting methods, so that any two large groups of voters should generate similar results. In fact (as was widely known), more Democrats had requested mail-in ballots than Republicans and mail-in votes would take longer to count, so the later-counted votes came from a different population than the earlier-counted votes. The "blue shift" toward Biden as mail-in votes continued to be counted had been expected, in part because several states (including Pennsylvania) prohibit processing of mail-in ballots before Election Day. The Supreme Court dismissed the suit.

Cicchetti's analysis was described as "ludicrous," "comical," and "statistical incompetence" by several academics. Kenneth Mayer, professor of political science at the University of Wisconsin–Madison, said the analysis "is going to be used in undergraduate statistics classes as a canonical example of how not to do statistics." David Post, a law professor at the Beasley School of Law, wrote that "Cicchetti's analysis—for which, I assume, he was paid handsomely—is merely silly, irrelevant, and a total waste of time." PolitiFact rated Cicchetti's claims "Pants on Fire." A 2021 PNAS study by political scientists at Stanford University and the University of Chicago rebutted Cicchetti's analysis as being not even remotely convincing.

== Selected publications ==
- Cicchetti, Charles J. (1972). Alaskan Oil: Alternative Routes and Markets. Routledge. OCLC 610289317.
- Cicchetti, Charles J.; Dubin, Jeffrey A.; Long, Colin M. (2004). The California Electricity Crisis: What, Why, and What's Next. Kluwer Academic Publishers. ISBN 1-4020-8032-8. OCLC 57054145.
