= Mount Arlington, New Jersey =

Borough in Morris County, New Jersey, US

- Borough
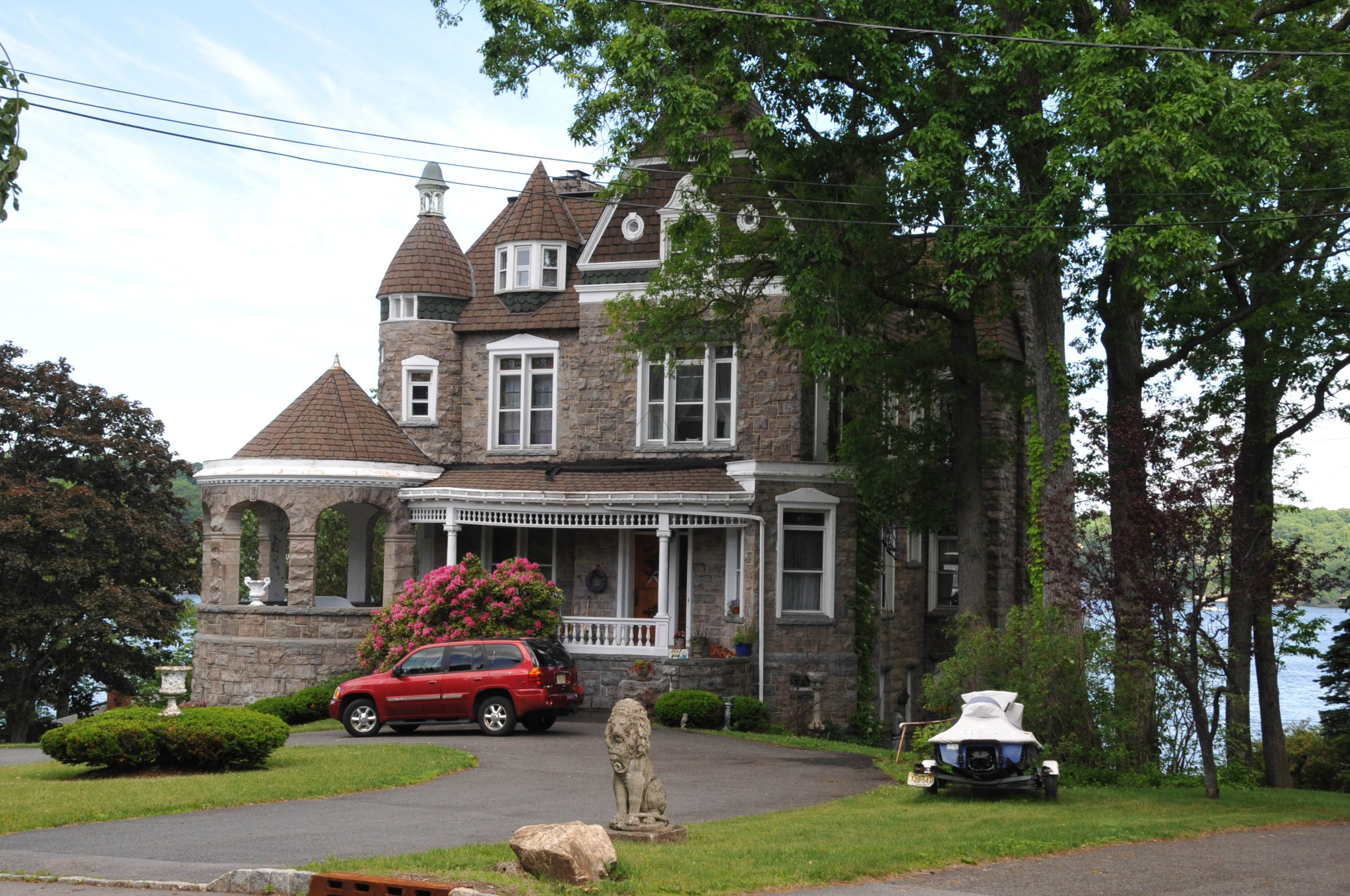
- "Castle on the Lake" in Mount Arlington

- Seal

- Location of Mount Arlington in Morris County highlighted in red (right). Inset map: Location of Morris County in New Jersey highlighted in orange (left).

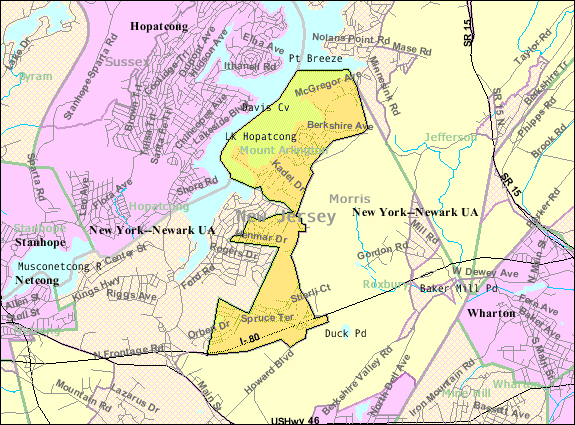
- Census Bureau map of Mount Arlington, New Jersey

- Location in Morris County Location in New Jersey Location in the United States
- Coordinates: 40.920751°N 74.640791°W
- Country: United States
- State: New Jersey
- County: Morris
- Incorporated: November 3, 1890
- Named for: Henry Bennet, 1st Earl of Arlington

Government
  - Type: Borough
  - Body: Borough Council
  - Mayor: Michael Stanzilis (R; term ends December 31, 2026)
  - Administrator: Carolyn Rinaldi
  - Municipal clerk: Ashley Todd

Area
  - Total: 2.80 sq mi (7.25 km^{2})
  - Land: 2.14 sq mi (5.55 km^{2})
  - Water: 0.66 sq mi (1.70 km^{2}) 23.30%
  - Rank: 356th of 565 in state 28th of 39 in county
- Elevation: 1,079 ft (329 m)

Population (2020)
  - Total: 5,909
  - Estimate (2023): 5,931
  - Rank: 350th of 565 in state 30th of 39 in county
  - Density: 2,761.2/sq mi (1,066.1/km^{2})
  - Rank: 234th of 565 in state 11th of 39 in county
- Time zone: UTC−05:00 (Eastern (EST))
  - Summer (DST): UTC−04:00 (Eastern (EDT))
- ZIP Code: 07856
- Area code: 973
- FIPS code: 3402748690
- GNIS feature ID: 0885312
- Website: www.mountarlingtonnj.org

Mount Arlington is a borough in western Morris County, in the U.S. state of New Jersey. As of the 2020 United States census, the borough's population was 5,909, an increase of 859 (+17.0%) from the 2010 census count of 5,050, which in turn reflected an increase of 387 (+8.3%) from the 4,663 counted in the 2000 census.

The borough is located on the southeast shore of Lake Hopatcong, New Jersey's largest lake and a major recreational resource. Mount Arlington is home to the Lake Hopatcong Yacht Club.

== History ==
While Mount Arlington is now mostly a suburban residential community, it was once a resort community. In the era before the world wars and the advent of air travel, it was a respite for the residents of nearby New York City and Newark.

Every summer, thousands would arrive by train at Landing Station, and then travel by water taxi across Lake Hopatcong to the area's many large resort hotels to escape the city heat and enjoy the famous "Mount Arlington breeze" which always cooled the summer evenings. There was also a major amusement park, Bertrand Island, which featured a world-famous carousel and roller coaster, which operated until the park was closed in 1983.

Mount Arlington was incorporated as a borough by an act of the New Jersey Legislature on November 3, 1890, from portions of Roxbury, based on the results of a referendum held two days earlier. Additional territory was acquired from Roxbury on July 25, 1891, on May 31, 1893, and on May 31, 1894. The borough is named for Henry Bennet, 1st Earl of Arlington.

In March 2014, members of the public petitioned the New Jersey Department of Community Affairs to form the Roxbury Mount Arlington Study Commission to consider a possible consolidation of Mount Arlington and the neighboring municipality of Roxbury. In March 2015, the commission was formed with five members and two alternates from each municipality. If the commission had voted to recommend a merger, the decision would have had to be ratified by a referendum of the voters in each community.

== Geography ==
According to the United States Census Bureau, the borough had a total area of 2.79 square miles (7.23 km^{2}), including 2.14 square miles (5.54 km^{2}) of land and 0.65 square miles (1.68 km^{2}) of water (23.30%).

The borough borders the municipalities of Jefferson Township and Roxbury in Morris County; and Hopatcong in Sussex County.

== Recreation ==
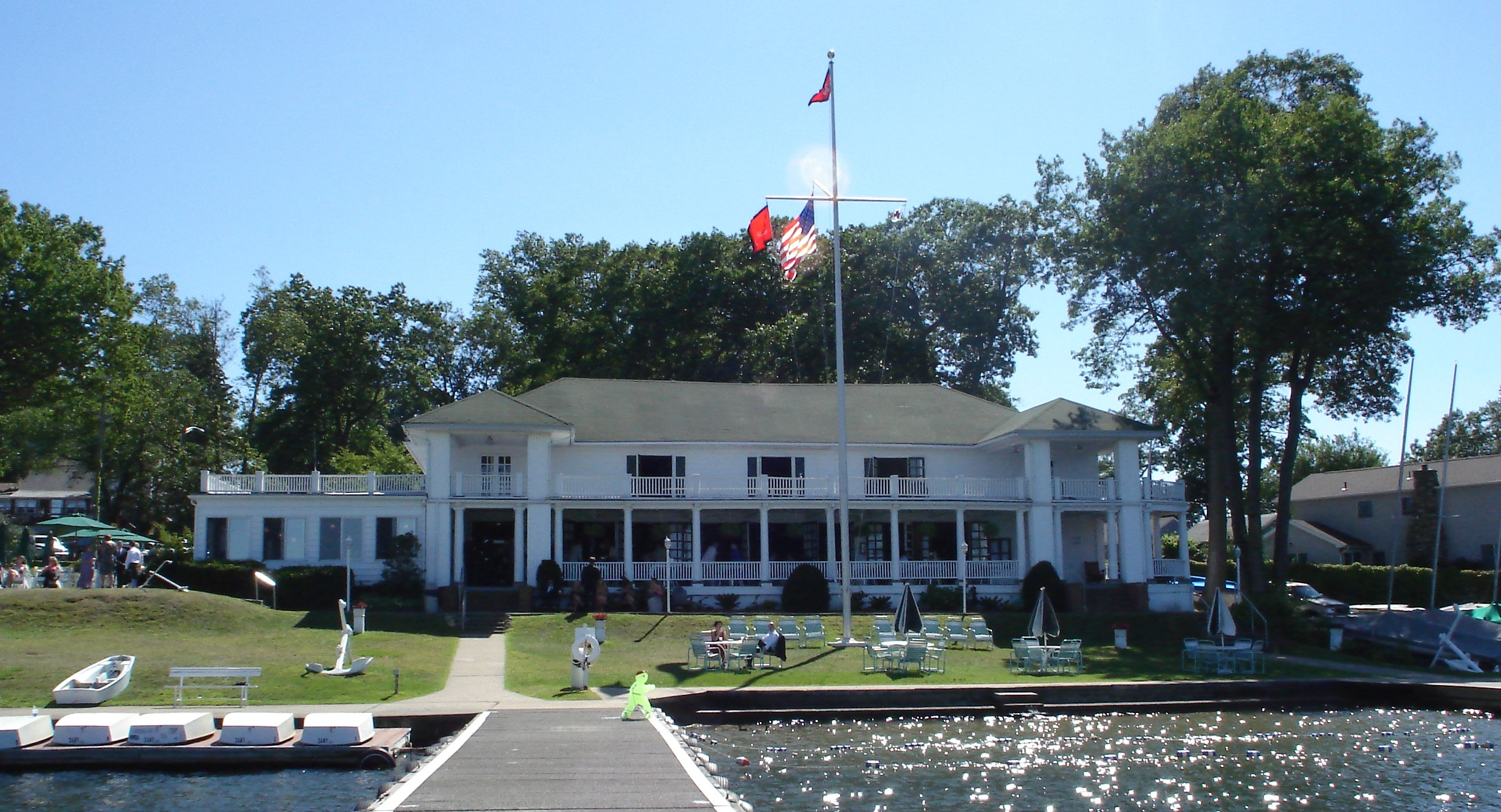
Lake Hopatcong Yacht Club

Mount Arlington is home to the Lake Hopatcong Yacht Club. Established in 1905, it is a private yacht club located on the small peninsula of Bertrand Island along Lake Hopatcong. The Adirondack style clubhouse structure was completed in 1910 and was added in 1999 to both the National and New Jersey registers of historic places.

== Demographics ==
Historical population
Census	Pop.	Note	%±
1900	275		—
1910	277		0.7%
1920	213		−23.1%
1930	306		43.7%
1940	456		49.0%
1950	639		40.1%
1960	1,246		95.0%
1970	3,590		188.1%
1980	4,251		18.4%
1990	3,630		−14.6%
2000	4,663		28.5%
2010	5,050		8.3%
2020	5,909		17.0%
2023 (est.)	5,931	▲	0.4%
Population sources:1900–1920 1900–1910 1910–1930; 1940–2000 2000; 2010 2020

=== 2020 census ===
As of the 2020 census, Mount Arlington had a population of 5,909. The median age was 49.2 years. 14.5% of residents were under the age of 18 and 25.6% of residents were 65 years of age or older. For every 100 females there were 86.4 males, and for every 100 females age 18 and over there were 83.0 males age 18 and over.

98.6% of residents lived in urban areas, while 1.4% lived in rural areas.

There were 2,651 households in Mount Arlington, of which 20.7% had children under the age of 18 living in them. Of all households, 45.8% were married-couple households, 14.9% were households with a male householder and no spouse or partner present, and 32.1% were households with a female householder and no spouse or partner present. About 32.5% of all households were made up of individuals and 16.5% had someone living alone who was 65 years of age or older.

There were 2,915 housing units, of which 9.1% were vacant. The homeowner vacancy rate was 1.2% and the rental vacancy rate was 9.3%.

Racial composition as of the 2020 census
Race	Number	Percent
White	4,649	78.7%
Black or African American	205	3.5%
American Indian and Alaska Native	10	0.2%
Asian	341	5.8%
Native Hawaiian and Other Pacific Islander	1	0.0%
Some other race	217	3.7%
Two or more races	486	8.2%
Hispanic or Latino (of any race)	719	12.2%

=== 2010 census ===
The 2010 United States census counted 5,050 people, 2,283 households, and 1,347 families in the borough. The population density was 2,325.2 per square mile (897.8/km^{2}). There were 2,545 housing units at an average density of 1,171.8 per square mile (452.4/km^{2}). The racial makeup was 90.44% (4,567) White, 2.32% (117) Black or African American, 0.18% (9) Native American, 3.58% (181) Asian, 0.04% (2) Pacific Islander, 1.41% (71) from other races, and 2.04% (103) from two or more races. Hispanic or Latino people of any race were 8.22% (415) of the population.

Of the 2,283 households, 21.8% had children under the age of 18; 47.2% were married couples living together; 8.9% had a female householder with no husband present and 41.0% were non-families. Of all households, 34.6% were made up of individuals and 14.9% had someone living alone who was 65 years of age or older. The average household size was 2.21 and the average family size was 2.88.

17.9% of the population were under the age of 18, 5.8% from 18 to 24, 24.7% from 25 to 44, 31.2% from 45 to 64, and 20.4% who were 65 years of age or older. The median age was 45.8 years. For every 100 females, the population had 85.6 males. For every 100 females ages 18 and older there were 80.9 males.

The Census Bureau's 2006–2010 American Community Survey showed that (in 2010 inflation-adjusted dollars) median household income was $77,240 (with a margin of error of +/− $14,564) and the median family income was $93,780 (+/− $8,872). Males had a median income of $61,838 (+/− $16,955) versus $59,950 (+/− $11,428) for females. The per capita income for the borough was $43,226 (+/− $4,107). About none of families and 2.8% of the population were below the poverty line, including 2.9% of those under age 18 and 5.7% of those age 65 or over.

=== 2000 census ===
As of the 2000 United States census there were 4,663 people, 1,918 households, and 1,262 families residing in the borough. The population density was 2,207.1 inhabitants per square mile (852.2/km^{2}). There were 2,039 housing units at an average density of 965.1 per square mile (372.6/km^{2}). The racial makeup of the borough was 91.42% White, 1.82% African American, 0.19% Native American, 3.82% Asian, 0.04% Pacific Islander, 1.27% from other races, and 1.44% from two or more races. Hispanic or Latino people of any race were 4.55% of the population.

There were 1,918 households, out of which 28.3% had children under the age of 18 living with them, 54.5% were married couples living together, 8.7% had a female householder with no husband present, and 34.2% were non-families. 27.9% of all households were made up of individuals, and 6.2% had someone living alone who was 65 years of age or older. The average household size was 2.42 and the average family size was 2.99.

In the borough the population was spread out, with 22.1% under the age of 18, 5.3% from 18 to 24, 35.5% from 25 to 44, 26.5% from 45 to 64, and 10.6% who were 65 years of age or older. The median age was 38 years. For every 100 females, there were 90.6 males. For every 100 females age 18 and over, there were 87.1 males.

The median income for a household in the borough was $67,213, and the median income for a family was $79,514. Males had a median income of $53,049 versus $40,417 for females. The per capita income for the borough was $32,222. About 2.3% of families and 3.3% of the population were below the poverty line, including 5.3% of those under age 18 and 3.4% of those age 65 or over.

== Government ==
=== Local government ===
Mount Arlington is governed under the borough form of New Jersey municipal government, which is used in 218 municipalities (of the 564) statewide, making it the most common form of government in New Jersey. The governing body is comprised of the mayor and the borough council, with all positions elected at-large on a partisan basis as part of the November general election. The mayor is elected directly by the voters to a four-year term of office. The borough council has six members, elected to serve three-year terms on a staggered basis, with two seats coming up for election each year in a three-year cycle. The borough form of government used by Mount Arlington is a "weak mayor / strong council" government in which council members act as the legislative body with the mayor presiding at meetings and voting only in the event of a tie. The mayor can veto ordinances subject to an override by a two-thirds majority vote of the council. The mayor makes committee and liaison assignments for council members, and most appointments are made by the mayor with the advice and consent of the council.

As of 2025, the mayor of Mount Arlington is Republican Michael Stanzilis, who is serving a term of office ending December 31, 2026. In April 2016, Stanzilis was selected by the borough council from three names nominated by the Republican municipal committee to fill the seat following the death of Arthur R. Ondish; Stanzilis served on an interim basis until the November 2016 general election when he was elected to serve the two years remaining on the term of office. Members of the Borough Council are Council President Jack Delaney (R, 2023), Dave BaRoss (R, 2024; appointed to serve an unexpired term), Andrew Cangiano (R, 2025), Melissa Fostle (R, 2023), Nita Galate (R, 2024) and Rockie Fuller (R, 2025).

In December 2024, the borough council appointed Rockie Fuller to fill the seat expiring in December 2025 that had been held by Leonard "Lee" Loughridge Jr.

In February 2023, the borough council appointed Dave BaRoss to fill the seat expiring in December 2024 that had been held by Maria Farris.

In January 2020, the borough council appointed Melissa Fostle to fill the seat expiring in December 2020 that became vacant when Steve Sadow resigned to move out of the borough.

In the November 2019 general election, Republicans Maria Farris and Debra Galate were elected to fill the seats expiring in December 2021 that had been held by Raymond Simard and Robert Sorge.

In May 2016, the borough council appointed Jack Delaney to fill the council seat expiring in December 2017 that had been held by Michael Stanzilis until he was appointed as interim mayor; Delaney served on an interim basis until the November 2016 general election, when he was elected to serve the balance of the term of office.

Mount Arlington hosts a joint municipal court with Wharton.

=== Federal, state and county representation ===
Mount Arlington is located in the 7th Congressional District and is part of New Jersey's 25th state legislative district.

For the 119th United States Congress, New Jersey's 7th congressional district is represented by Thomas Kean Jr. (R, Westfield). New Jersey is represented in the United States Senate by Democrats Cory Booker (Newark, term ends 2027) and Andy Kim (Moorestown, term ends 2031).

For the 2026–2027 session, the 25th legislative district of the New Jersey Legislature is represented in the State Senate by Anthony M. Bucco (R, Boonton Township) and in the General Assembly by Aura K. Dunn (R, Mendham Borough) and Marisa Sweeney (D, Morristown).

Morris County is governed by a Board of County Commissioners comprised of seven members who are elected at-large in partisan elections to three-year terms on a staggered basis, with either one or three seats up for election each year as part of the November general election. Actual day-to-day operation of departments is supervised by County Administrator Deena Leary.

As of 2026, Morris County's Commissioners (with all terms ending December 31) are Director Stephen H. Shaw (R, Mountain Lakes, 2027), Deputy Director John Krickus (R, Washington Township, 2027), Douglas Cabana (R, Boonton Township, 2028), Thomas J. Mastrangelo (R, Montville, 2028), Christine Myers (R, Harding Township, 2028), Tayfun Selen (R, Chatham Township, 2026), and Deborah Smith (R, Denville Township, 2027).

The county's constitutional officers are County Clerk Ann F. Grossi (R, Parsippany–Troy Hills, 2028), Sheriff James M. Gannon (R, Boonton Township, 2025) and Surrogate Heather Darling (R, Roxbury, 2029).

=== Politics ===
United States presidential election results for Mount Arlington 2024 2020 2016 2012 2008 2004
Year	Republican		Democratic		Third party(ies)	
Year	No.	%	No.	%	No.	%
2024	1,965	54.66%	1,566	43.56%	64	1.78%
2020	1,932	52.74%	1,671	45.62%	60	1.64%
2016	1,734	58.42%	1,133	38.17%	101	3.40%
2012	1,457	57.98%	1,036	41.23%	20	0.80%
2008	1,535	57.15%	1,123	41.81%	28	1.04%
2004	1,456	60.09%	951	39.25%	16	0.66%

As of March 2011, there were a total of 3,687 registered voters in Mount Arlington, of which 726 (19.7%) were registered as Democrats, 1,448 (39.3%) were registered as Republicans and 1,511 (41.0%) were registered as Unaffiliated. There were 2 voters registered as either Libertarians or Greens.

In the 2012 presidential election, Republican Mitt Romney received 58.0% of the vote (1,457 cast), ahead of Democrat Barack Obama with 41.2% (1,036 votes), and other candidates with 0.8% (20 votes), among the 2,525 ballots cast by the borough's 3,904 registered voters (12 ballots were spoiled), for a turnout of 64.7%. In the 2008 presidential election, Republican John McCain received 56.6% of the vote (1,535 cast), ahead of Democrat Barack Obama with 41.4% (1,123 votes) and other candidates with 1.0% (28 votes), among the 2,714 ballots cast by the borough's 3,695 registered voters, for a turnout of 73.5%. In the 2004 presidential election, Republican George W. Bush received 59.9% of the vote (1,456 ballots cast), outpolling Democrat John Kerry with 39.1% (951 votes) and other candidates with 0.5% (16 votes), among the 2,432 ballots cast by the borough's 3,396 registered voters, for a turnout percentage of 71.6.

Gubernatorial election results for Mount Arlington
Year	Republican		Democratic		Third party(ies)	
Year	No.	%	No.	%	No.	%
2025	1,468	52.04%	1,340	47.50%	13	0.46%
2021	1,398	60.47%	898	38.84%	16	0.69%
2017	1,010	59.66%	651	38.45%	32	1.89%
2013	1,177	71.81%	430	26.24%	32	1.95%
2009	1,130	63.02%	512	28.56%	151	8.42%
2005	858	57.12%	611	40.68%	33	2.20%

In the 2013 gubernatorial election, Republican Chris Christie received 71.8% of the vote (1,177 cast), ahead of Democrat Barbara Buono with 26.2% (430 votes), and other candidates with 2.0% (32 votes), among the 1,664 ballots cast by the borough's 3,790 registered voters (25 ballots were spoiled), for a turnout of 43.9%. In the 2009 gubernatorial election, Republican Chris Christie received 62.5% of the vote (1,130 ballots cast), ahead of Democrat Jon Corzine with 28.3% (512 votes), Independent Chris Daggett with 7.5% (136 votes) and other candidates with 0.8% (15 votes), among the 1,808 ballots cast by the borough's 3,679 registered voters, yielding a 49.1% turnout.

United States Senate election results for Mount Arlington1
Year	Republican		Democratic		Third party(ies)	
Year	No.	%	No.	%	No.	%
2024	1,799	53.40%	1,502	44.58%	68	2.02%
2018	1,451	58.53%	948	38.24%	80	3.23%
2012	1,325	56.84%	985	42.26%	21	0.90%
2006	1,011	59.12%	671	39.24%	28	1.64%

United States Senate election results for Mount Arlington2
Year	Republican		Democratic		Third party(ies)	
Year	No.	%	No.	%	No.	%
2020	1,877	52.55%	1,648	46.14%	47	1.32%
2014	823	61.28%	499	37.16%	21	1.56%
2013	676	59.09%	458	40.03%	10	0.87%
2008	1,386	57.39%	974	40.33%	55	2.28%

== Education ==
The Mount Arlington School District serves public school students in pre-kindergarten through eighth grade. As of the 2023–24 school year, the district, comprised of two schools, had an enrollment of 357 students and 42.4 classroom teachers (on an FTE basis), for a student–teacher ratio of 8.4:1. Schools in the district (with 2023–24 enrollment from the National Center for Education Statistics) are Edith M. Decker School (with 133 students in grades PreK–2, including a pre-school disabilities program) and Mount Arlington Public School (with 217 students in grades 3–8). Both schools are located along the eastern bank of Lake Hopatcong.

For ninth through twelfth grades, public school students attend Roxbury High School in Roxbury, as part of a sending/receiving relationship with the Roxbury School District. As of the 2023–24 school year, the high school had an enrollment of 1,171 students and 115.9 classroom teachers (on an FTE basis), for a student–teacher ratio of 10.1:1.

== Transportation ==
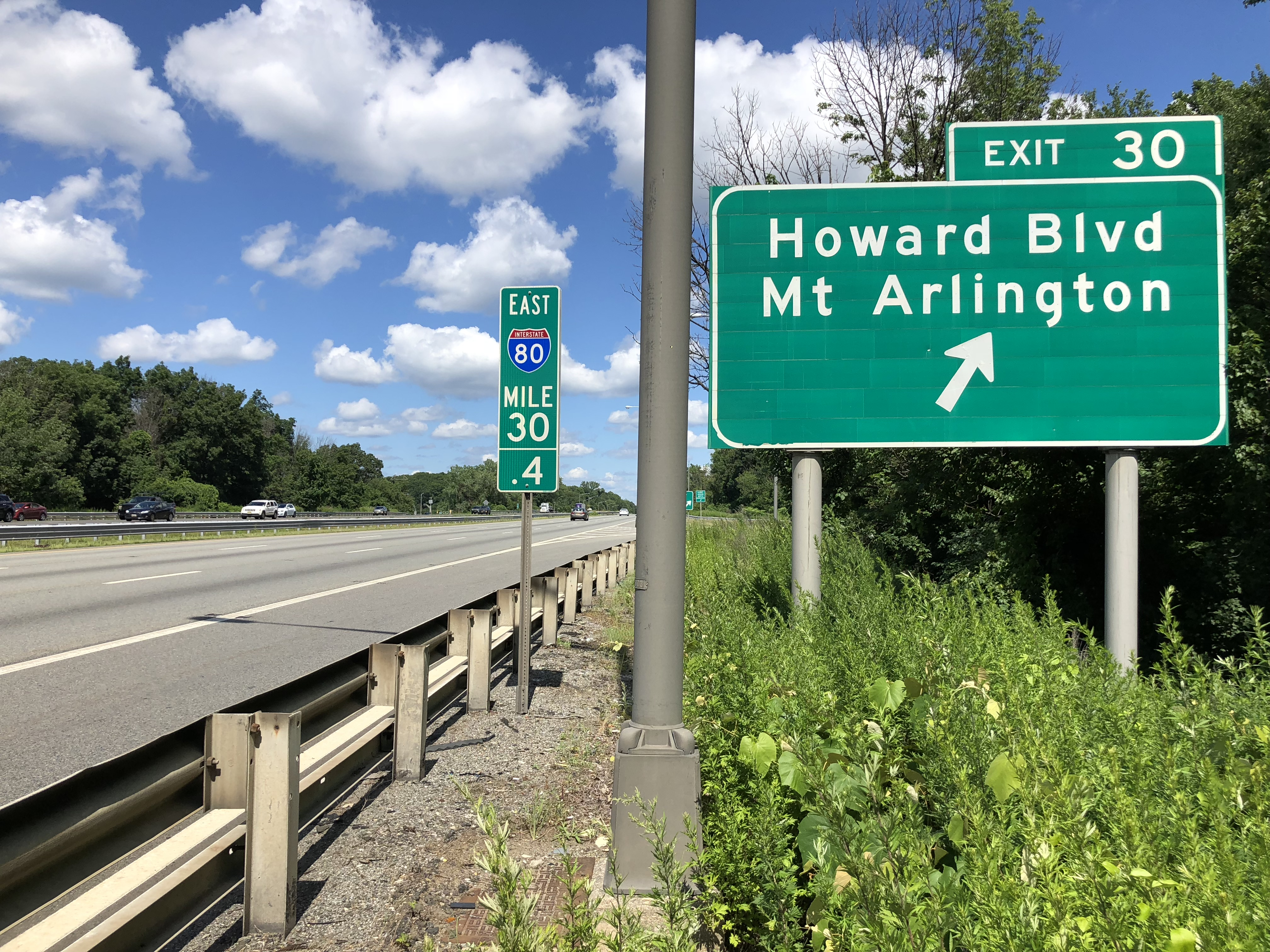
Interstate 80 eastbound in Mount Arlington

=== Roads and highways ===
As of May 2010, the borough had a total of 21.12 miles (33.99 km) of roadways, of which 15.10 miles (24.30 km) were maintained by the municipality, 4.65 miles (7.48 km) by Morris County and 1.37 miles (2.20 km) by the New Jersey Department of Transportation.

Interstate 80 is the main highway serving Mount Arlington, running for nearly 1.4 miles (2.3 km) through the borough. One interchange, Exit 30, is located within Mount Arlington.

=== Public transportation ===
NJ Transit provides service at the Mount Arlington station on the Morris & Essex Lines and the Montclair-Boonton Line to Newark Broad Street Station, Hoboken Terminal, Secaucus Junction and New York Penn Station in Midtown Manhattan via Midtown Direct service.

Lakeland Bus Lines provides service along Interstate 80 operating between Newton and the Port Authority Bus Terminal in Midtown Manhattan.

== Notable people ==
People who were born in, residents of, or otherwise closely associated with Mount Arlington include:

- Larry Arico (born 1969), former head college football coach for the Fairleigh Dickinson University–Florham Devils and William Paterson University Pioneers football programs
- Lotta Crabtree (1847–1924), actress
- Cortlandt V.R. Schuyler (1900–1993), United States Army four-star general who served as chief of staff, Supreme Headquarters Allied Powers Europe (COFS SHAPE) from 1953 to 1959
- Harry L. Sears (1920–2002), politician who served for 10 years in the New Jersey Legislature, and was indicted on charges of bribery and conspiracy after delivering $200,000 from financier Robert Vesco to Richard Nixon's 1972 presidential campaign
