= Lake Hopatcong =

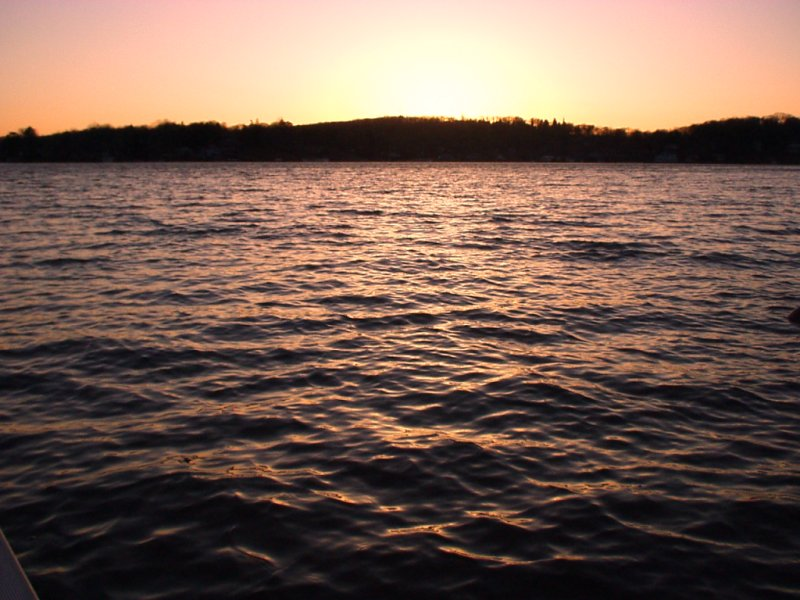
- At sunset, seen from Bertrand Island

- Location within Morris County, New Jersey Location within Sussex County, New Jersey Location within New Jersey Location within the United States
- Location: Morris / Sussex counties, New Jersey, United States
- Coordinates: 40°57′N 74°38′W
- Type: natural lake, reservoir
- Primary inflows: Weldon Brook, Unnamed Streams, natural spring
- Primary outflows: Musconetcong River
- Basin countries: United States
- Max. length: 9 mi (14 km)
- Max. width: 800 ft (240 m) to 1 mi (1.6 km)
- Surface area: 4 sq mi (10 km^{2})
- Max. depth: 50 ft (15 m)
- Shore length^{1}: Over 50 mi (80 km)
- Surface elevation: 950 ft (290 m)
- Islands: Bertrand Island/Halsey Island/Raccoon Island/Liffy Island
- Settlements: Mount Arlington/Hopatcong/Jefferson/Roxbury Township
- ^{1} Shore length is not a well-defined measure.

Lake Hopatcong is the largest freshwater body in New Jersey, United States, about 4 square miles (10 km^{2}) in area. Located 30 miles (48 km) from the Delaware River and 40 miles (64 km) from Manhattan, New York City, the lake forms part of the border between Sussex and Morris counties in the state's northern highlands region.

Lake Hopatcong was produced by damming and flooding of two ponds, known as the Great Pond and Little Pond, and the Musconetcong River, its natural outlet. Historically known as a resort lake for vacationing New Yorkers, it is now a mostly suburban residential lake.

== Name ==
The exact origin of the name Hopatcong is unknown, though it is most commonly attributed to the Lenape Indian word for "stone water," or "stone over water". Some linguists believe "Hopatcong" to be a derivative of the Lenape word hapakonoesson, meaning "pipe stone". One explanation of the origin of the word Hopatcong is that it was a derivation from the Lenni Lenape word Huppakong meaning "honey waters of many coves," but this wording was probably invented at the beginning of the 20th century to stimulate tourism.

Before the late 1700s, Lake Hopatcong was known by several names, including Great Pond and Little Pond (before flooding into a single lake), Sandhay Sea (circa 1648), Brookland Pond (mid-1700s), and Musconetcong Pond (1769).

== Lake formation ==
Before the last ice age, the waters of the prehistoric Hopatcong basin fed into the Raritan River. The glacier that shaped much of the New Jersey Highlands formed a long terminal moraine that forced water from the basin into the Musconetcong River. The glacier left behind two ponds, nearly 2 miles (3.2 km) apart.

In the early 1700s, the Great Pond stretched between Henderson Bay and today's Hopatcong State Park. Little Pond was a small body of water to the south of Woodport. The two lakes were first dammed in 1750. By 1831, Lake Hopatcong had been flooded to nearly its current shape.

== History ==
=== Native Americans ===
The Lenape Indians discovered the area of Lake Hopatcong about 12,000 years ago. They settled near the Great Pond and Little Pond, which provided abundant fish and forested shores with ample game. The waters became important to the traditions of the matrilineal clans of Native Americans.

=== Colonial development ===
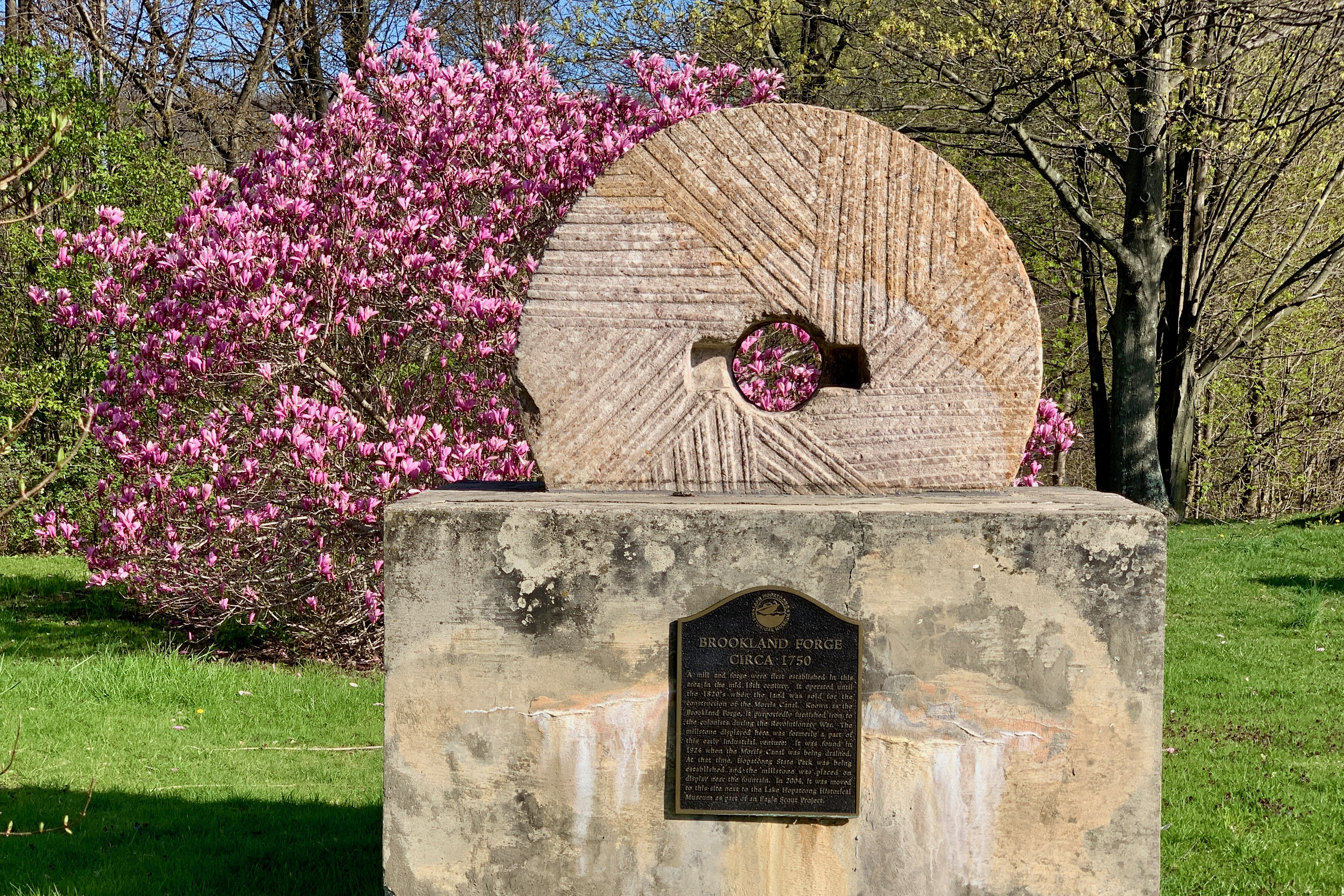
Brookland Forge display

Colonial exploration of the Great and Little Ponds began in the 1600s. Between 1750 and 1764, a dam was built on the Musconetcong River for the Brookland Forge and mill where the river empties from the lake (now the area of Hopatcong State Park), raising the water level by about 6 feet (1.8 m) and joining the Great and Little Ponds into one. By this time, most of the local Lenape population had died of disease or left the area.

In the years that followed the American Revolution, little development occurred near Lake Hopatcong because of the mountainous terrain.

=== Industrialization ===
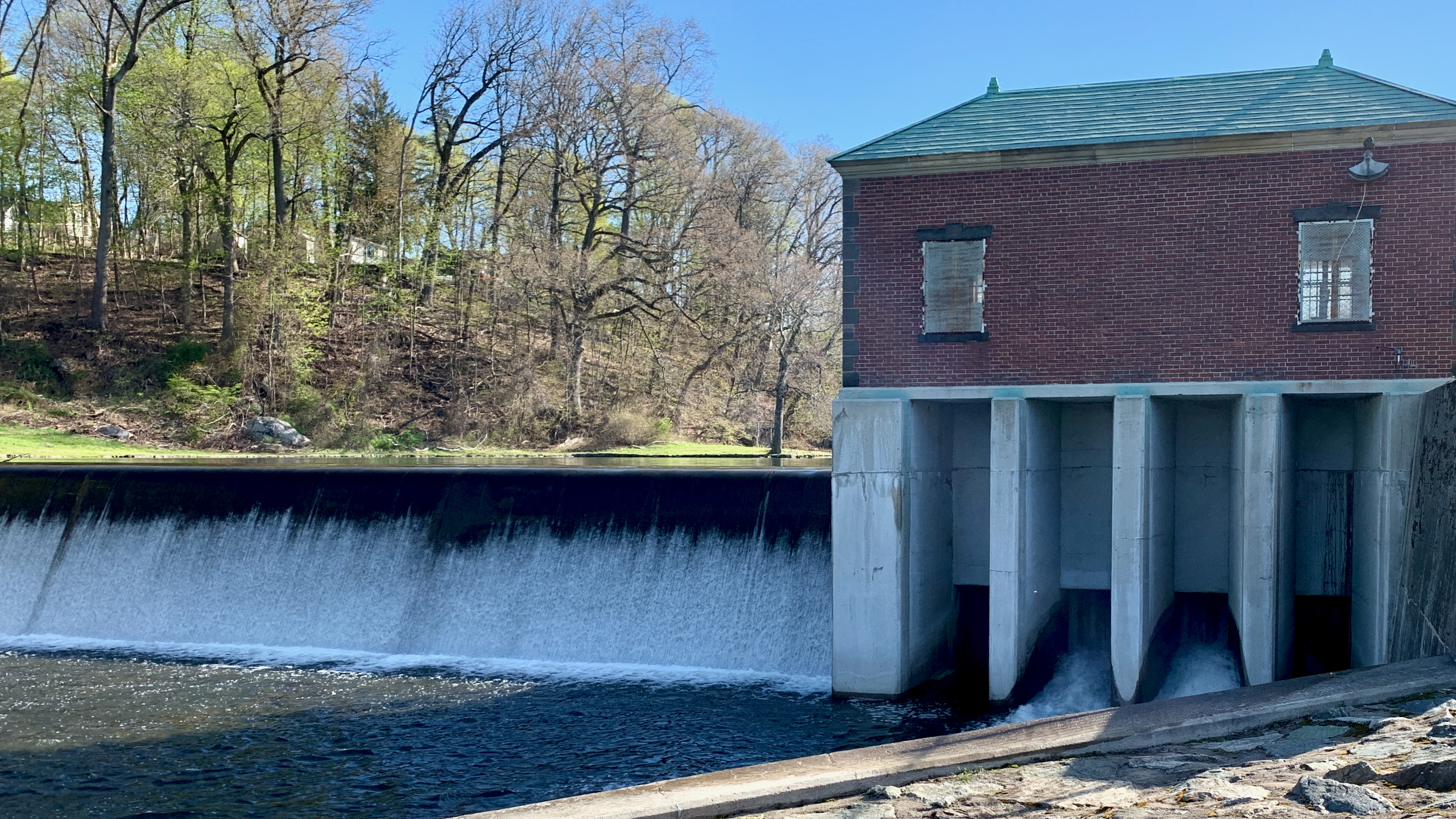
Lake Hopatcong Dam forming the lake

More than 900 feet (270 m) above sea level, Lake Hopatcong served as a natural high point and primary water supply for the Morris Canal between the Delaware River and New York Harbor. In 1831, the Morris Canal Company purchased the Brookland Forge site and replaced the dam with its own, with the intention of using the lake water to supply the Morris Canal, which would connect Phillipsburg to Newark. This new dam raised the water 12 feet (3.7 m) above the original level of Great Pond, and caused the Great Pond to connect with Little Pond and form the current Lake Hopatcong.

The flooding and subsequent formation of a single, large lake created a new geography of the area. Halsey Island and Raccoon Island, the only two true islands on Lake Hopatcong, were disconnected from the mainland. Bertrand Island and Liffy Island formed as peninsulas. Other changes included the creation of Prospect Point, the backflowing of the River Styx in Hopatcong to create an inlet, and King Cove and the south end of the lake near Landing.

In the 1850s, the Morris and Essex became the first railroad to reach Lake Hopatcong on the southern end. In the 1860s, the Ogden Mine Railroad used Nolan's Point to transfer ore from northern New Jersey mines into canal boats. The railroad and canal systems were the chief means of transporting coal, iron, and zinc across New Jersey in the 1860s. In 1866, over 880,000 long tons (890,000 t) of freight was transported on the canal.

=== Ice harvesting ===
A few years after passenger rail reached the lake, the Brady brothers began cutting ice there, and Lake Hopatcong became one of the principal sources of natural ice for the eastern United States. In winter more than a thousand men worked the harvest, cutting blocks up to two feet thick, floating them to storage houses packed with sawdust, and loading them onto trains bound for New York City; the ice trains ran longer than the summer passenger trains. The trade ended around 1930. Mountain Ice Company, the largest operator, took its last harvest from the lake in 1934, and its 56-foot icehouse was demolished within five years.

=== Resort destination ===
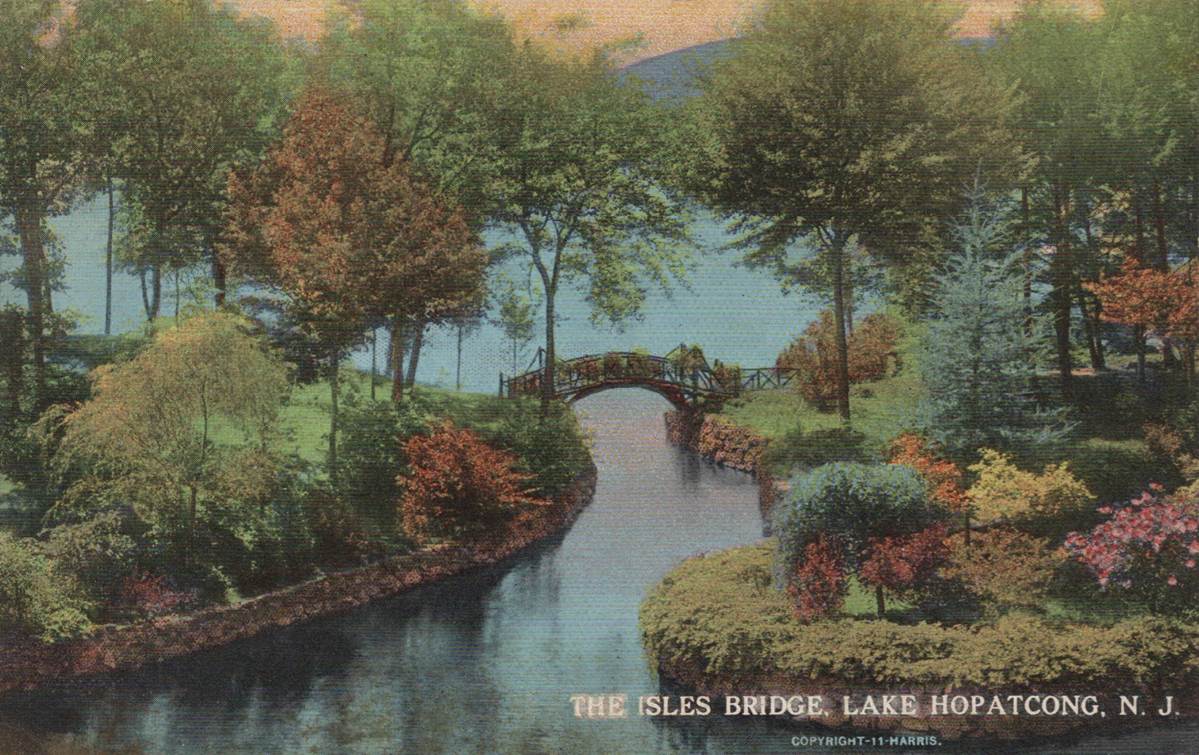
The Isles Bridge, circa 1911

In 1882, passenger rail service came to Lake Hopatcong, brought by the Central Railroad of New Jersey, which terminated at Nolan's Point. This turned the lake into a popular summer resort.

Among the hotels built to support the growing tourism industry was the luxurious Breslin Hotel, constructed in Van Every Cove in Mount Arlington with 250 rooms and electricity. During the peak summer season, the lake was so popular that hotel rooms were difficult to come by and some visitors resorted to camping near the lake.

Various amusements sprang up around the lake. Bertrand Island Amusement Park was open for the late spring, summer, and early fall seasons. The island also hosted beauty pageants, including an unofficial 1934 Miss America. The Lake Hopatcong Yacht Club, constructed in 1910 on Bertrand Island, remains a landmark.

Lake Hopatcong hosted several strong chess tournaments in the 1920s, including the Ninth American Chess Congress in 1923, which was won by Frank Marshall and Abraham Kupchik, and another tournament in 1926, which was won by world champion José Raúl Capablanca.

Lake Hopatcong flourished in the 1920s, and many famous people owned property on the lake, including Vaudeville's Joe Cook, who owned Sleepless Hollow in Davis Cove; Vaudeville's Owen McGiveney (father to Maura McGiveney), who owned a house in the River Styx section for more than 30 years; actress Lotta Crabtree, who owned the Attol Tryst home in Mount Arlington; and inventor and chemist Hudson Maxim. Their presence attracted many famous visitors, including Babe Ruth, Bud Abbott, Bert Lahr,Lou Costello, and Milton Berle.

=== Reservoir proposal ===
As freight on the Morris Canal collapsed, from about 459,000 tons of coal in 1860 to about 20,000 tons in 1902, the state of New Jersey began planning to convert the lake into a water-supply reservoir for Newark and Jersey City, which would have ended boating, swimming, and fishing. Hudson Maxim, the lake's largest landowner, argued against the plan in a 1913 pamphlet, Lake Hopatcong the Beautiful. Around 1920 a group of lakefront owners formed the Lake Hopatcong Corporation, with Maxim as its largest shareholder, and bought up the "Niles Rights," title to the lake bed descending from the colonial proprietors and auctioned in 1882 to Nathaniel Niles, so that the state could not take the lake without condemning privately held land. Once the reservoir plan was abandoned, the corporation gave up the rights and dissolved, and the lake remained open to the public.

=== Conversion to residential lake ===
Tourism and other business endeavors near the lake, hit hard by the Great Depression, waned in the 1930s and 1940s. Permanent residences were constructed in the area, including small bungalows, in the 1940s and '50s. Much of the modern residential development surrounding the lake was completed in the 1960s and '70s.

=== 21st century ===
==== 2000 flood ====
More than 14 inches (36 cm) of rain fell in a small area of southeastern Sussex and northwestern Morris County in northwestern New Jersey during August 11–14, 2000. Doppler radar estimates of total rainfall for the 4-day period reached about 15 inches (38 cm) along the border between Sussex and Morris Counties. A severe thunderstorm on August 12 dropped so much rain in six hours that it was judged a 1,000-year event.

Peak flows at the USGS gauges on Lake Hopatcong (01455400) and Musconetcong River (01455500), among others, were the highest ever recorded. These gauges are at sites that drain areas that received 10 or more inches of rain during August 11–14. Peak flows on Lake Hopatcong and on the Musconetcong River just downstream from the lake exceeded those of a 100-year flood.

Lake Hopatcong sustained flooding damage, particularly the Great Cove area at Nolan's Point.

==== 2008-09 drawdown ====
Every five years, starting the day after Labor Day, the New Jersey Department of Environmental Protection’s (DEP) water-level management plan allows the lake to be lowered five feet (1.5 m) to inspect the dam structure, repair lakeshore structures, control aquatic vegetation, and remove silt and drainage material from areas around the lake.

From December 2008 to January 2009, the DEP left the dam open almost three weeks too long, which caused the water to drop almost a foot (0.3 m) below the normal drawdown level. A group of residents and business owners, led by Ray Fernandez of Bridge Marina, Inc., sued the DEP and the State of New Jersey, claiming that the DEP, against policy, released an extra 1.5 billion US gallons (5,700,000 m^{3}). As of 2009 the case was being appealed in local court.

On May 11, 2009, the American Power Boat Association (APBA) and the Lake Hopatcong Racing Association (LHRA) postponed their annual races due to the low water level. However, with the large amount of rainfall that June, the lake returned to its proper level above the normal average depth.

In July 2014, there were reports of a 15 feet (4.6 m) boa constrictor in the lake, but officials by August mostly figured it was a myth or a hoax. According to one report, the reports caused a 10% drop in tourism to the lake during the summer of 2014.

==== 2019 harmful algal bloom ====
In the summer of 2019 the lake experienced a severe bloom of cyanobacteria, triggered by heavy spring rain that carried nutrients into the lake followed by hot, calm weather. The New Jersey Department of Environmental Protection issued advisories closing public beaches and warning against swimming, water-skiing, and eating fish from affected areas. Blooms recurred in later years; in 2022 a sample from Crescent Cove measured 171,500 cells per milliliter, more than twice the 80,000-cell threshold at which the state issues an advisory. The Lake Hopatcong Foundation and the consulting firm Princeton Hydro, under state oversight, have treated the lake with Phoslock, a clay product that binds phosphorus, and in late 2022 the state allocated about $1.75 million in federal American Rescue Plan funds to the lake for bloom control.

== Today ==
Lake Hopatcong is now mostly a residential lake whose few public access points include Hopatcong State Park and Lee's County Park Marina. Most of the shoreline is privately owned by individual lakefront residents, homeowner or community associations, or private businesses (e.g., restaurants and marinas).

Unlike most lakes in New Jersey (other than Greenwood Lake on the New York border and Lake Lackawanna in Byram), Lake Hopatcong has bars and restaurants that are accessible directly by boat. Popular tourist attractions on the lake include the Hopatcong State Park, the Lake Hopatcong Historical Museum, and the Lake Hopatcong Yacht Club.

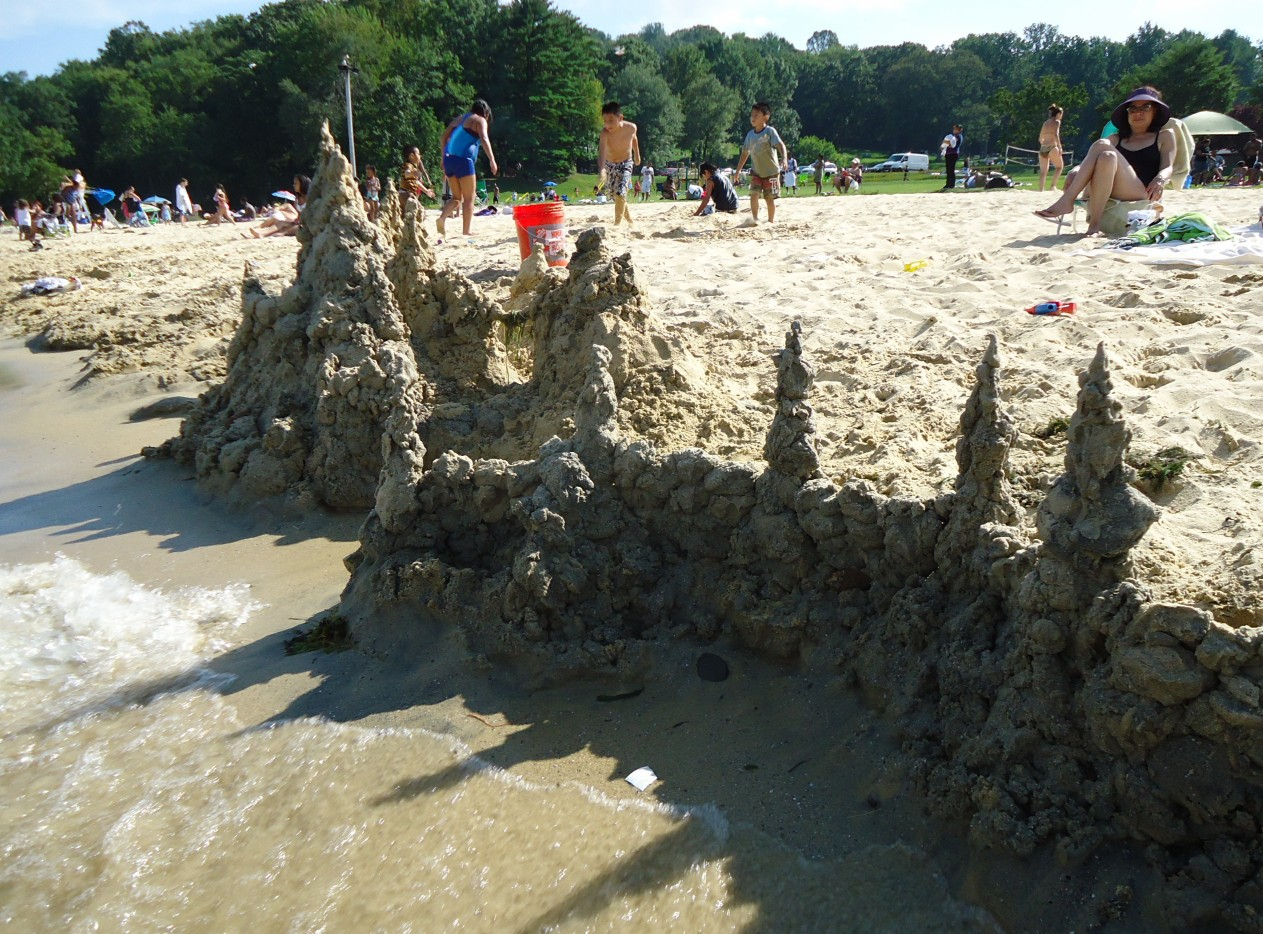
Sandcastle at Lake Hopatcong.

On November 22, 2005, the EPA gave the Lake Hopatcong Commission a federal grant of $745,000 to improve the water quality and prevent phosphorus from entering the lake.

== Lake management ==
Lake Hopatcong is shared by two counties (Sussex and Morris) and four boroughs and townships (Mount Arlington, Hopatcong, Jefferson Township, and Roxbury Township).

At some point in the 20th century, decisions about lake management were shaped by the state-funded Lake Hopatcong Regional Planning Board, which made recommendations to the state. Made up of representatives from each town, county, and the state, the board proved ineffective. Weeds proliferated, water quality declined, and recreation suffered.

In January 2001, Governor of New Jersey Christie Whitman signed a bill to create the Lake Hopatcong Commission, a state-funded governing body with an annual budget to maintain, upgrade and protect the lake. The commission consists of 11 members: one representative apiece from Morris County, Sussex County, Hopatcong, Jefferson Township, Mount Arlington, and Roxbury Township; and five state members, including one from the Department of Environmental Protection and one from Community Affairs. The chairperson of the commission and two other public members are appointed by the governor.

The commission has seen annual budget cuts since its inception, and has provided little more than weed harvesting services. In 2012, the state took over the weed-harvesting services through Hopatcong State Park. The Lake Hopatcong Commission was not provided state funding for 2013 and now operates solely on grants. The commission administrator was laid off on December 21, 2012, and administrative responsibilities for grants are managed by Jefferson Township.

Water quality in Lake Hopatcong is monitored between May and October by environmental scientists to assess the lake’s ecological health and to guide restoration efforts under the watershed implementation plan.

== Wildlife ==
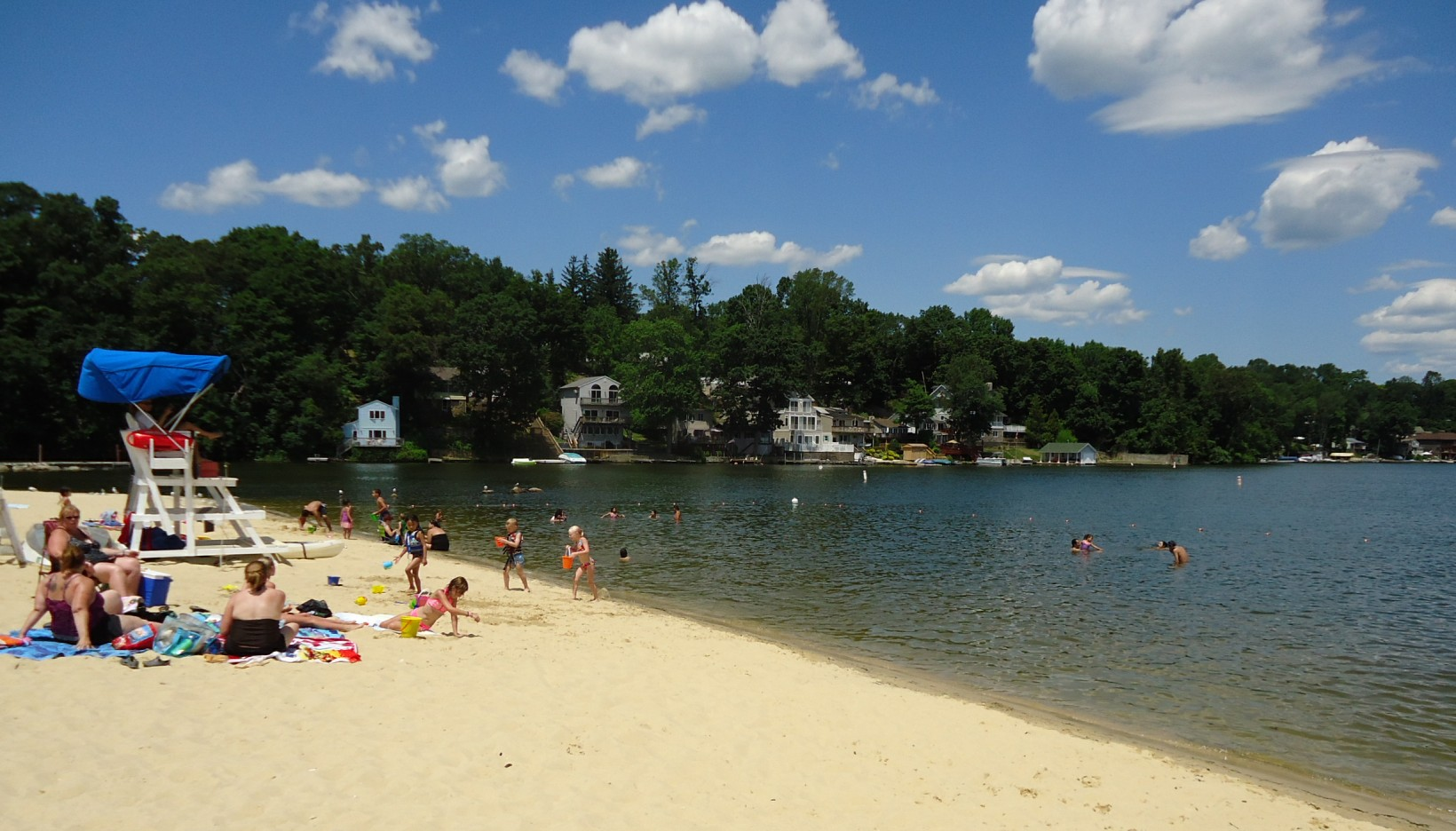
Beach at Lake Hopatcong State Park.

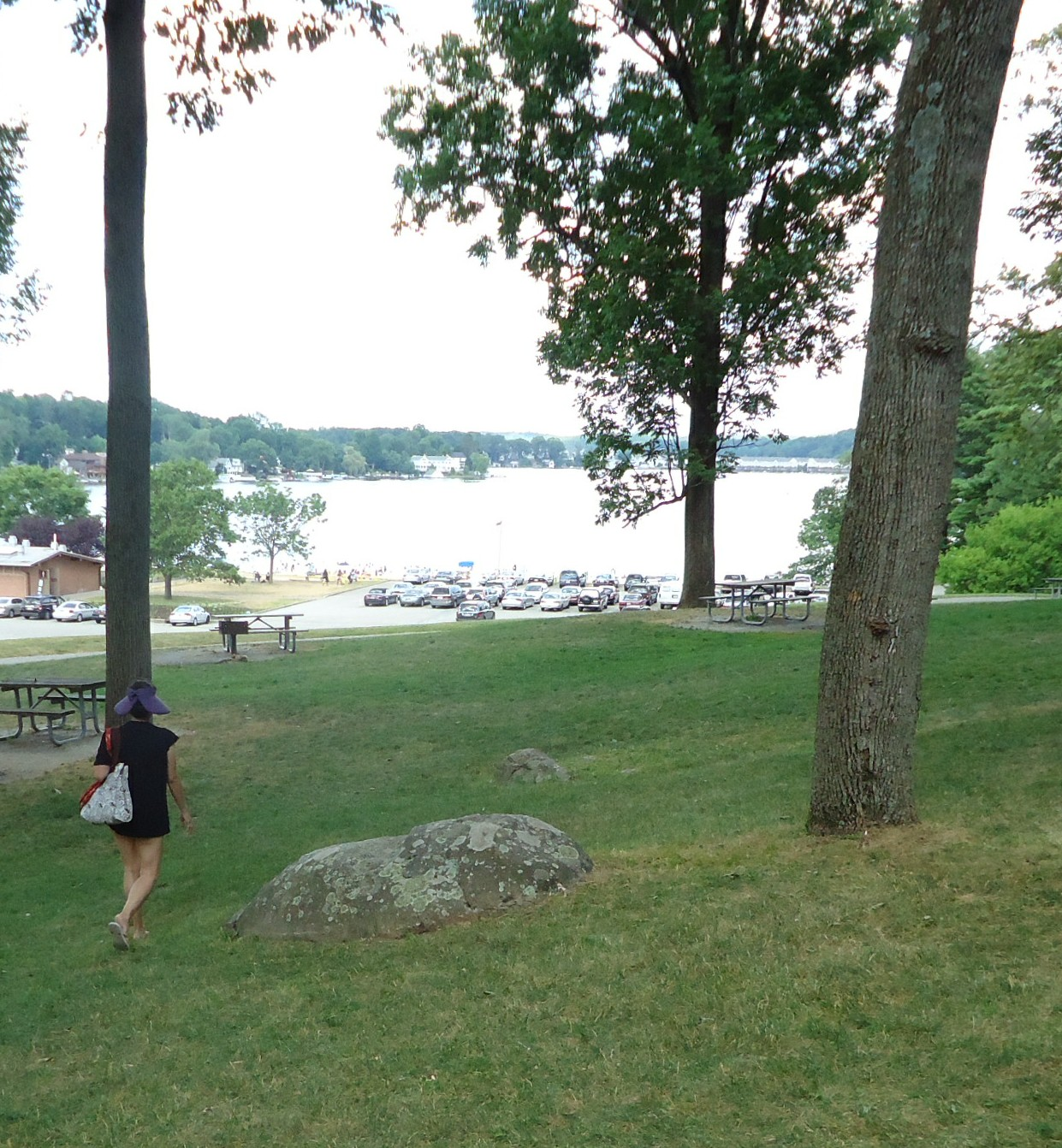
View of the lake from the picnic area at the state park.

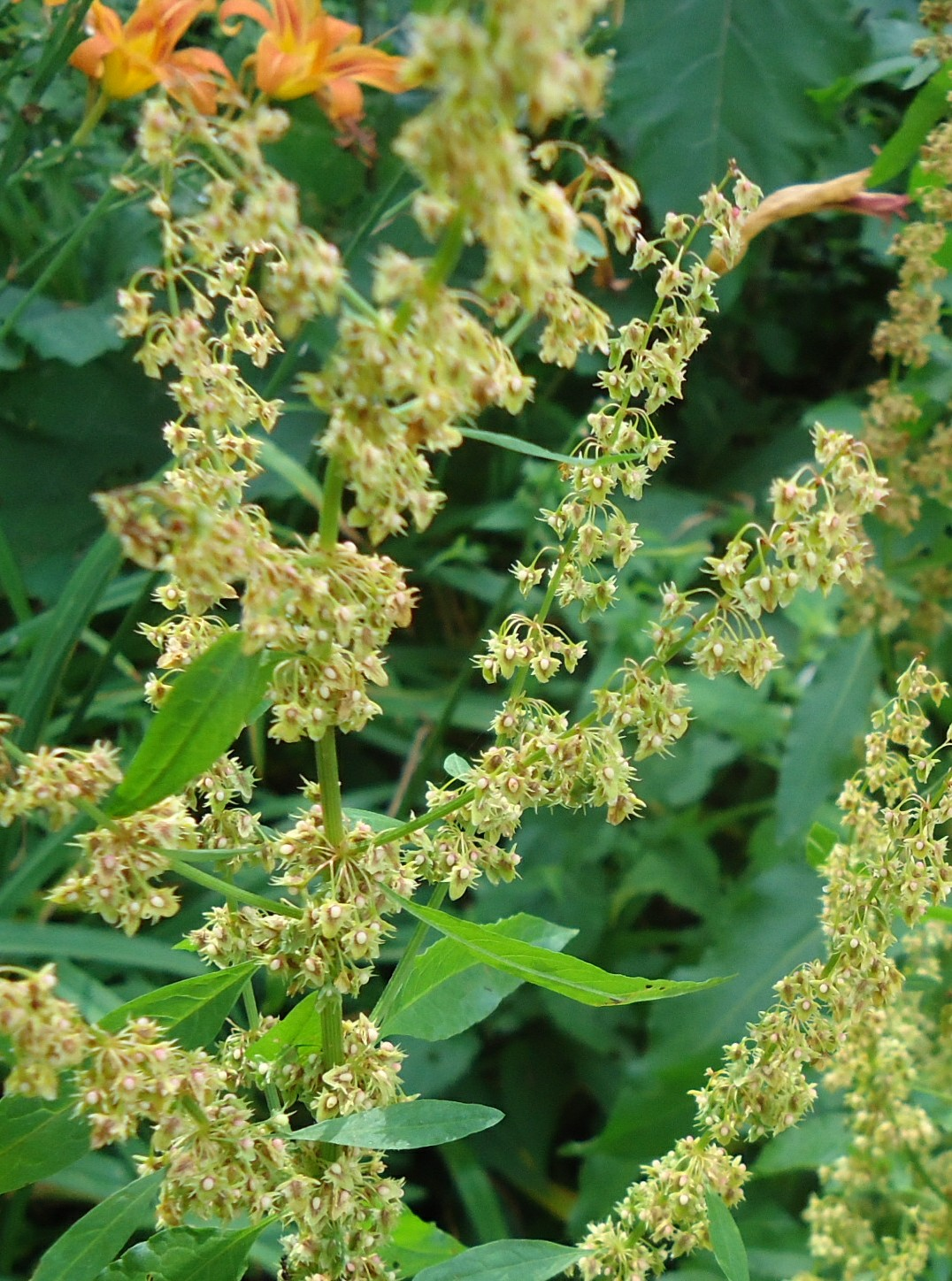
Wildflowers growing near the lake.

With the probable exception of the Delaware River, Lake Hopatcong is home to the greatest variety of gamefish species of any waterway in New Jersey.

Each spring, the New Jersey Division of Fish and Wildlife stocks the lake with rainbow trout, and in past years also stocked brook and brown trout, although they have not typically held over and survived the summers, due to an absence of cold, deep, oxygenated pockets of water in the lake. Largemouth bass, smallmouth bass, sunfish, yellow and white perch, rock bass, bluegill, crappie, chain pickerel, channel catfish, bullhead, and carp all inhabit the lake. Eels also have been caught. Hybrid striped bass, walleye, and most recently, muskellunge have been stocked within the last few decades and now are thriving. Catfish also are stocked from time to time. The main forage is the abundant alewife herring, (Clupea vernalis), the basis of the lake's fish food chain.
