= Hopatcong State Park =

State park in New Jersey, United States

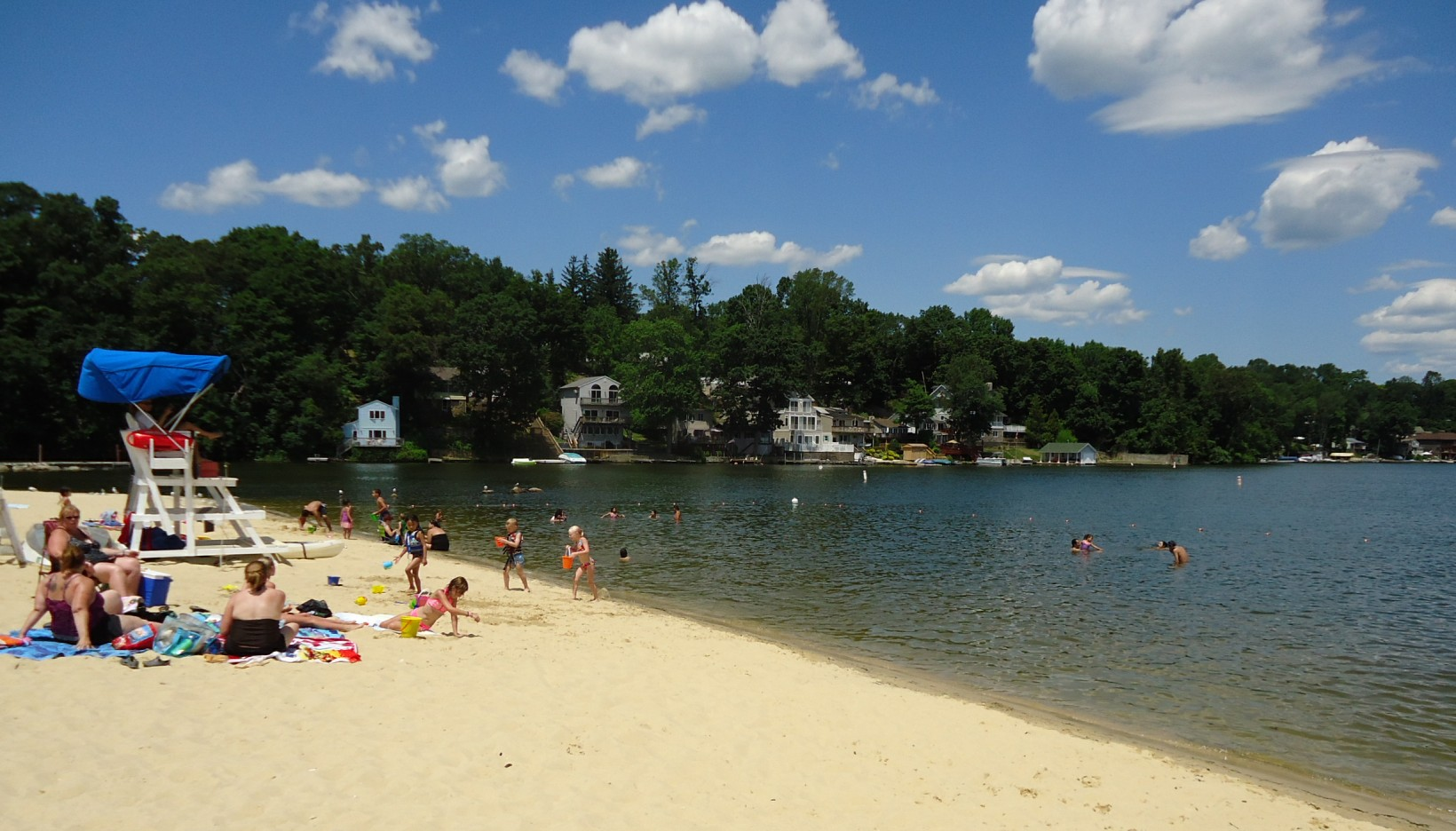
- A woman walks to the beach at Lake Hopatcong State Park in New Jersey.

- Location within Morris County, New Jersey Location within New Jersey Location within the United States
- Location: Roxbury
- Coordinates: 40°54′52″N 74°39′55″W
- Area: 163-acre (0.66 km^{2})
- Opened: 1922
- Operator: New Jersey Division of Parks and Forestry

Hopatcong State Park is a state park in the Landing section of Roxbury, New Jersey, United States. Operated and maintained by the New Jersey Division of Parks and Forestry, the park consists of two parcels of land: one that encompasses Lake Hopatcong and some of its southwestern shore, and another that encompasses Lake Musconetcong about one mile to the west-southwest.

The park contains remnants of Morris Canal, which operated from the 1830s to the 1920s and was largely fed by the lake. The park is also home to the Lake Hopatcong Historical Museum, housed in the former home of the lock tender and his family.

== Activities ==
Swimming is permitted in the park from Memorial Day through Labor Day while lifeguards are on duty.

Subject to NJDEP regulations, there is year-round fishing at Lake Hopatcong and Lake Musconetcong, which are stocked by New Jersey Division of Fish and Wildlife stocks them with brown trout, rainbow trout and brook trout. Commonly caught warmwater species include large mouth bass, sunfish, catfish, perch and pickerel. During the winter, ice fishing is allowed in at least 4 inches of ice.

Lake Hopatcong allows boating in canoes, large motor boats, sailboats, sailboards and jet skis. Boats are available for rent at many private marinas around the lake. Boating is subject to New Jersey Boating Regulations and Marine Law. There is a boat ramp in the park.

The park has two playgrounds, two half-basketball courts, sand volleyball, and a large playing field for field sports. There are several picnic areas in the park with grills and tables. Local children have been known to use the hill for winter sledding.

== Museum ==
The Lake Hopatcong Historical Museum was originally the Lock Tender's House, built in c. 1825, on the feeder canal for the Morris Canal. The museum has collections on the history of Lake Hopatcong, with emphasis on transportation and entertainment. The Brookland Forge, along with several mills on the Musconetcong River, were built nearby c. 1750 when the river had been dammed to form Brookland Pond, now known as Lake Hopatcong.

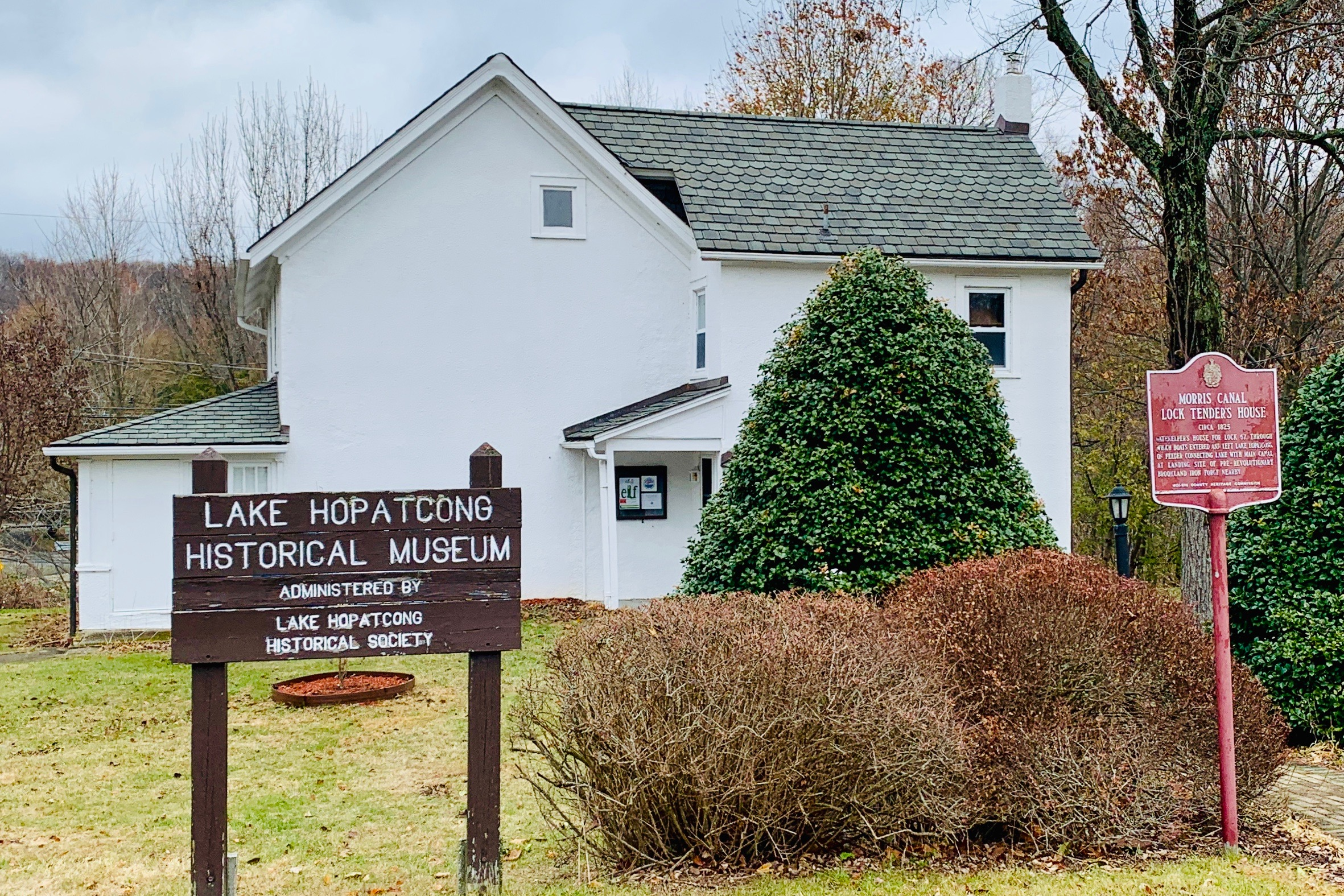
Lake Hopatcong Historical Museum

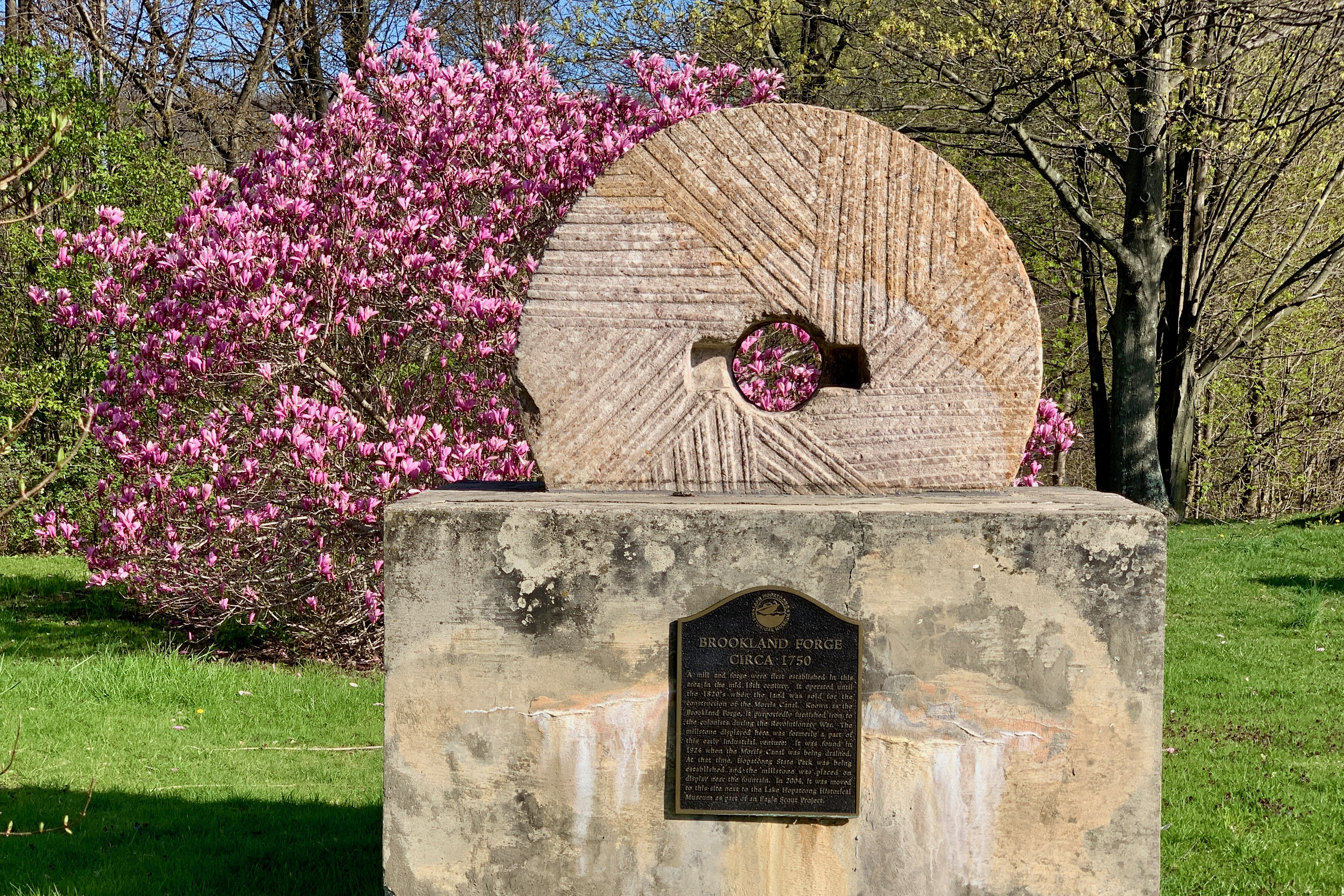
Brookland Forge display

== Morris Canal ==
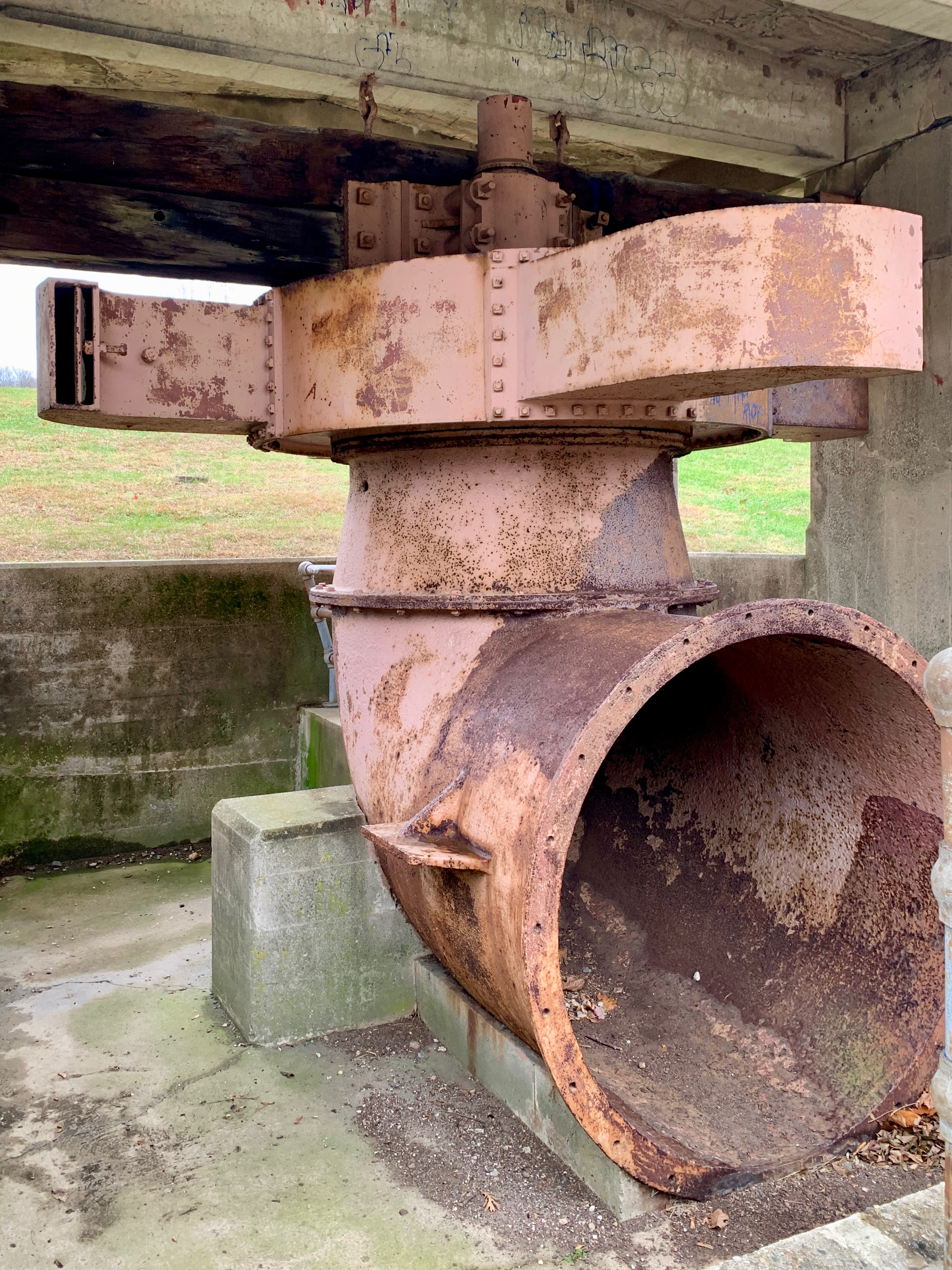
Display of Scotch Turbine

The park has a display of the technology used by the Morris Canal to power its inclined planes. The Scotch Turbine, a type of reaction turbine, from Inclined Plane 3 East, formerly at Ledgewood, was brought here in 1926 as the canal was being decommissioned.

== See also ==
- List of New Jersey state parks
