= Clinton Road (New Jersey) =

Road in US associated with strange events

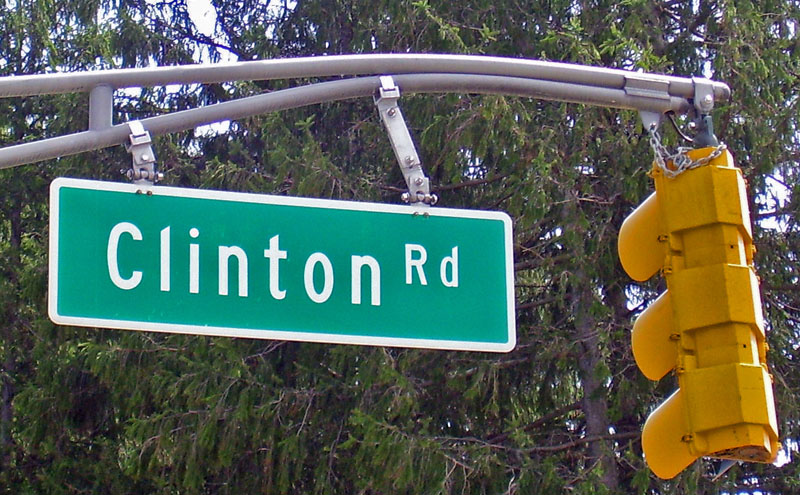

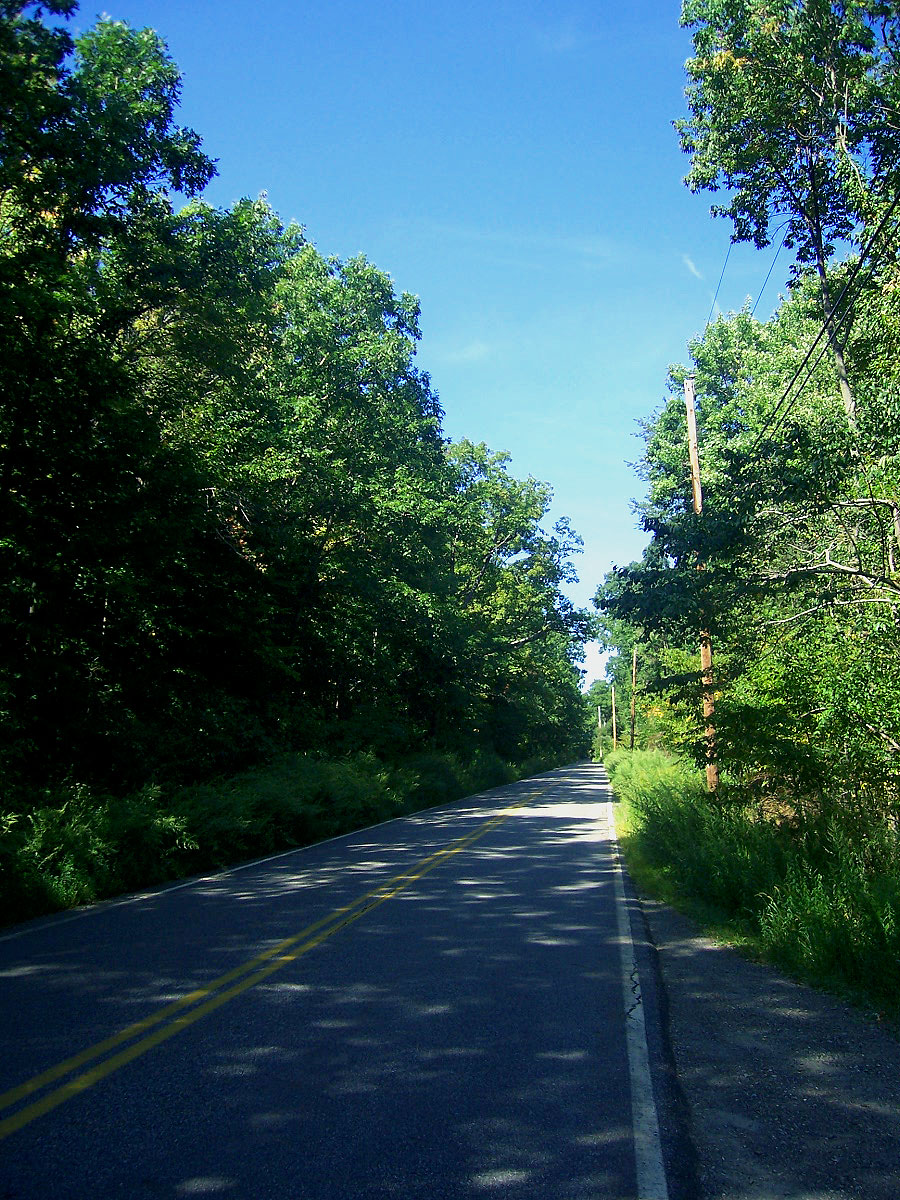
- Namesake: Former community along road
- Maintained by: West Milford Township
- Length: 11 mi (18 km)
- Location: West Milford, New Jersey, USA
- Coordinates: 41.054275°N 74.452189°W
- South end: Route 23 in West Milford
- North end: Warwick Turnpike in West Milford

Construction
- Completed: 1700s

Other
- Known for: Legends of paranormal activity

Clinton Road is located in West Milford, Passaic County, New Jersey, United States. It runs in a generally north–south direction, beginning at Route 23 near Newfoundland and running roughly 10 mi (16 km) to its northern terminus at Upper Greenwood Lake.

The road and the land around it have gained notoriety over the years as an area rife with many legends of paranormal occurrences such as sightings of ghosts, strange creatures, and gatherings of witches, Satanists, and the Ku Klux Klan. It is also rumored that professional killers dispose of bodies in the surrounding woods—with one recorded case of this occurring. It has been a regular subject of discussion in Weird NJ magazine, which once devoted an entire issue to it. In the words of a local police chief, "It's a long, desolate stretch and makes the imagination go nuts."

There are very few houses along the road. Much of the adjoining property is undeveloped publicly owned woodlands, either City of Newark watershed or state forest. The road is a narrow two-lane highway that receives little maintenance and is not part of New Jersey's county route system. Until fairly recently, the road was unpaved for some of its length, connecting two areas of minimal population and growth. It had little traffic even at the busiest times of day.

It is notorious for having the country's longest traffic light wait. This occurs at a double intersection where Route 23 crosses the road. The two lights can cause motorists to wait for five minutes in total. The lengthy wait was a result of traffic planners giving increased priority to Route 23 to reduce backups during rush hour.

== History ==
The road, like the reservoir in the area, gets its name from the original settlement of Clinton, which was located about where the road crosses the brook.

On May 18, 1983, the body of Daniel Deppner was found when a cyclist riding down Clinton Road in a wooded area of West Milford, New Jersey, spotted the corpse being eaten by a turkey vulture. The body had been wrapped inside a green garbage bag before dumping it. Richard Kuklinski was charged and convicted of his murder.

== Legends and folklore ==
The different areas along or near Clinton Road have been much cited as the setting of urban legends, especially by the publication Weird NJ, which has devoted numerous articles to the subject.

- Ghost boy bridge: According to Weird NJ, there is a legend that if someone puts a quarter in the middle of the road, at one of the bridges over Clinton Brook (Dead Man's Curve) near the reservoir, at midnight it will supposedly be returned by the ghost of a boy who drowned while swimming or had fallen in while sitting on the edge of the bridge. In some tellings, an apparition is seen. In others, the ghost pushes the teller into the water if they look over the side of the bridge.
- There have been other ghosts described by Weird NJ readers. One claims to have seen a ghost Camaro driven by a girl who supposedly died when she crashed it in 1988. Any mention while driving on the road at night is supposed to trigger a manifestation. Another claims to have encountered two park rangers one night while camping with friends near Terrace Pond, a glacial tarn on a ridge accessible from the road by hiking trails. They turn out to have been the ghosts of two rangers who died on the job in 1939. Other Weird NJ readers claim to have seen people dressed weirdly at odd hours who simply stare at those who see them and do not speak, who either disappear or are not seen by others present.
- The Druidic temple: A conical stone structure just east of the road south of the reservoir was said by Weird NJ readers to be a site where local Druids practiced their rituals, and horrible things might come to pass for any intruder who looked too closely or came at the wrong time. The building is actually an iron smelter built in 1826. It was listed on the National Register of Historic Places as Clinton Furnace in 1976. It is fenced off by the Newark water department to prevent any entrance and the liability for injury that might result.
- Ghost truck: According to the Travel Channel show Most Terrifying Places in America 2, phantom vehicles such as pickup trucks or even floating headlights not attached to any vehicle supposedly appear from nowhere in the middle of the night and chase drivers to the end of the road, then disappear.
- Strange creatures, from a hellhound (also known as "Wolfie"), an experimental Albino Wolf-Dog, to monkeys and unidentifiable hybrids, are alleged by Weird NJ to have been seen at night. If not of supernatural origin, they are said to be survivors of Jungle Habitat, a nearby attraction that has been closed since 1976, which have managed to survive and crossbreed.

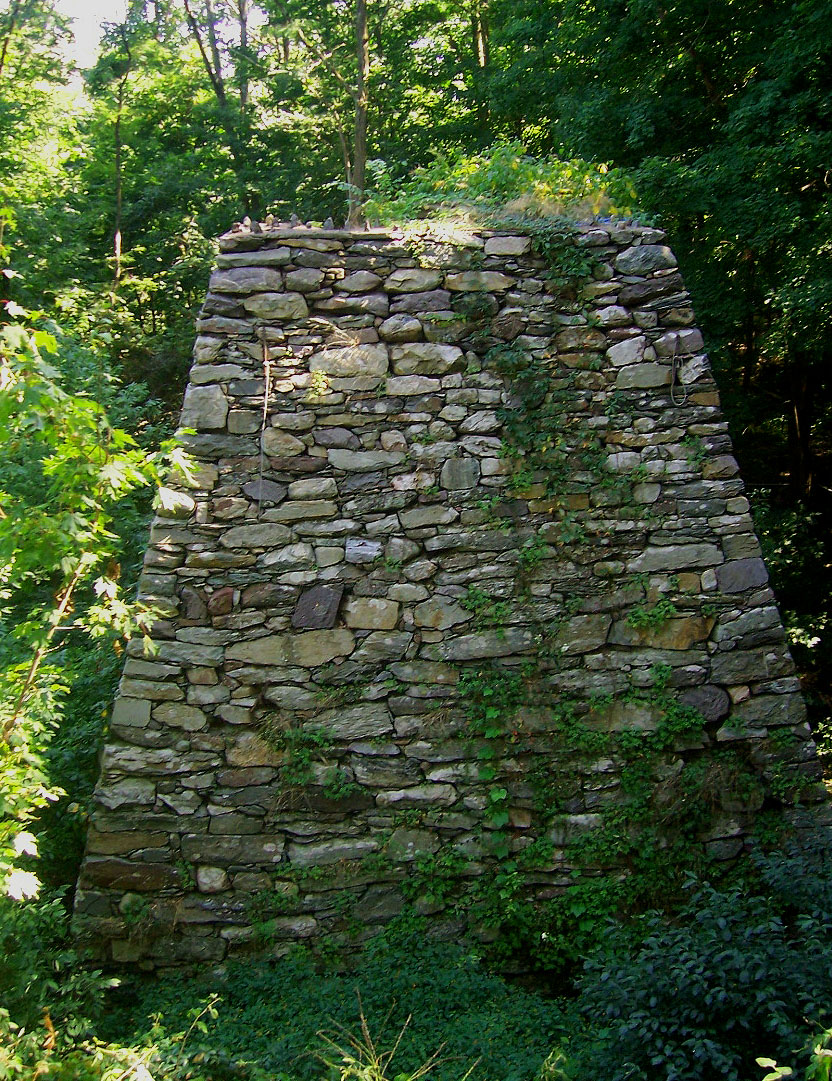
A 19th-century smelter mistakenly believed to be a Druidic temple

=== Cross Castle ===
In 1905, English born railroad official and banker Richard James Cross built a massive stone Tudor summer home, resembling a castle, on high land near the reservoir for his wife and three children. The house, built at an estimated cost of 1.5 million ($40.5 million in 2024), stood on a property with "365 acres (Note: 148 ha) of wooded glens, fields, and farm lands, along with a 77-acre pristine water body known as Hank's Pond."

Later in the 20th century, it fell into ruin after a fire had destroyed part of it, and became a popular destination for hikers and local teenagers looking for secluded locations to camp out and have parties.

According to Weird NJ, "visitors have written telling of strange occurrences in or near the castle site, such as people going into seizures and having bruises appearing on their bodies afterwards, or having strange, disturbing visions. Writings that suggest Satanic symbols have been reported as appearing on the castle's interior walls, particularly in areas that were supposedly inaccessible."

In 1988, Newark's water department razed the castle as an attractive nuisance, but the foundations remain and several hiking trails still lead to the site.

== See also ==
- Haunted highway
- Shades of Death Road, another rural road in New Jersey said to be a site for paranormal encounters
