= Clinton Furnace =

- U.S. National Register of Historic Places
- New Jersey Register of Historic Places
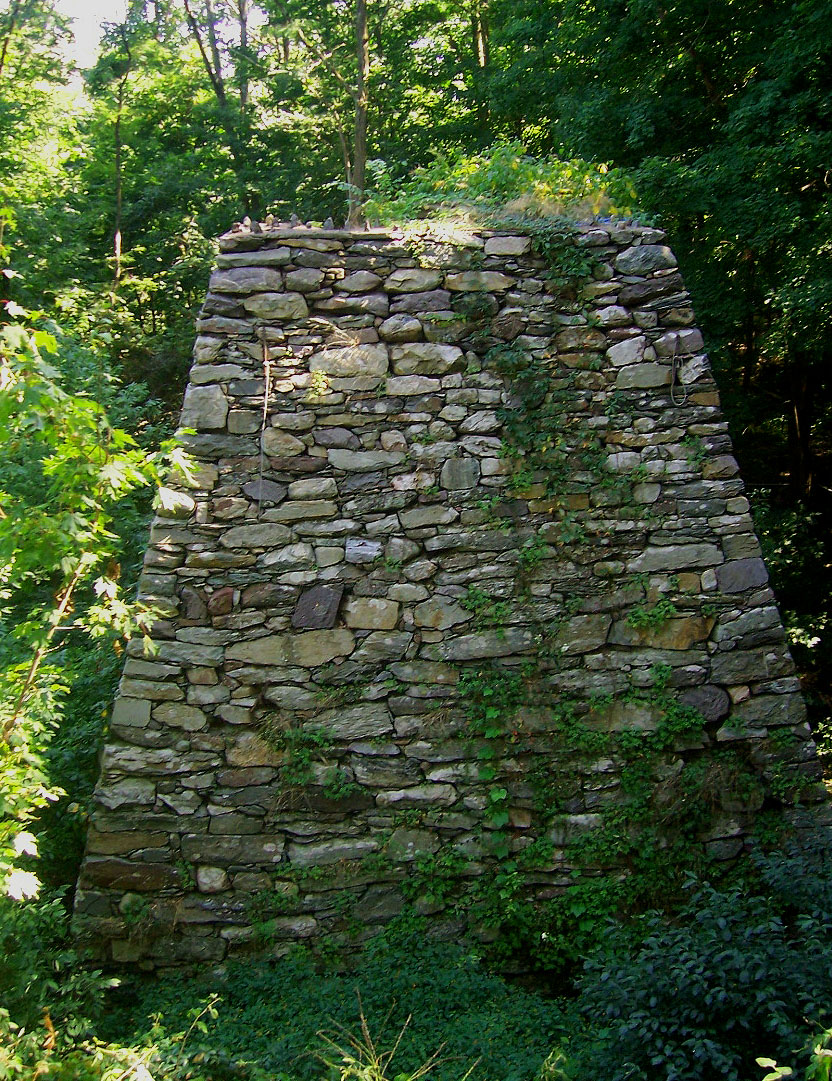

- Location within Passaic County, New Jersey Location within New Jersey Location within the United States
- Location: At the base of the Clinton Reservoir by the Clinton Brook, West Milford, New Jersey
- Coordinates: 41°4′20″N 74°27′0″W
- Area: 37 acres (15 ha)
- Built: 1826
- NRHP reference No.: 76001179
- NJRHP No.: 2420

Significant dates
- Added to NRHP: June 18, 1976
- Designated NJRHP: January 19, 1976

The Clinton Furnace, also known as the Clinton Ironworks, is located along Clinton Road at the base of the Clinton Reservoir by the Clinton Brook in the township of West Milford in Passaic County, New Jersey, United States. The furnace was built in 1826 and was added to the National Register of Historic Places on June 18, 1976, for its significance in industry. The furnace is the last surviving structure of the iron community once known as Clinton.

== History and description ==
In 1826, William Jackson, the son of Stephen Jackson from Rockaway, started construction of the furnace. It started operation in 1833, powered by the Clinton Brook. The iron ore came from local mines at Ringwood, Hibernia, Mount Pleasant, Ogdensburg and Hamburg. The furnace is 29 feet (8.8 m) wide at the base and 40 feet (12 m) high. Operations stopped in 1837. The property is now owned by the city of Newark as part of its watershed. The Clinton Reservoir was built in 1892.

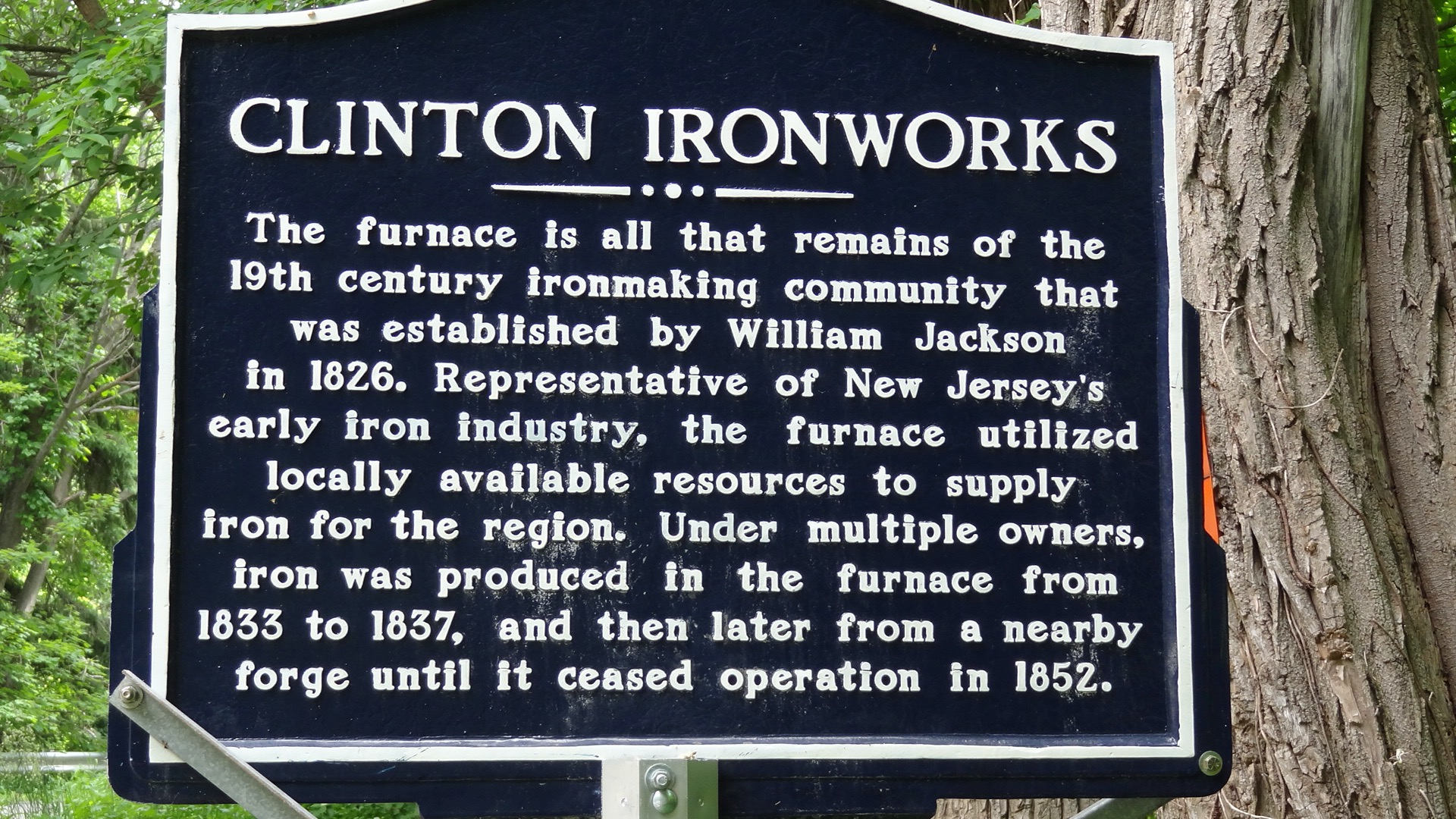
Clinton Ironworks information sign

== See also ==
- National Register of Historic Places listings in Passaic County, New Jersey
