= Ferdinand Steinmeyer =

Ferdinand Steinmeyer (13 October 1720 – 17 August 1786), also known as Ferdinand Farmer, was a German Jesuit missionary who worked in North America.

== Biography ==
He was born in Swabia, southern Germany and studied medicine for three years before entering the Society of Jesus at Landsberg in September 1743. He desired to labor on the missions in China but was sent to America instead, arriving in 1752. His first mission was at Lancaster, Pennsylvania. where he remained until 1758. He was then transferred to St. Joseph's Church in Philadelphia to look after the German settlers in that area.

=== Travels ===
Steinmeyer made horseback tours throughout eastern Pennsylvania and northern and central New Jersey every spring and autumn, ministering to the scattered groups of Catholics at Mount Hope, Macopin, Basking Ridge, Trenton, Ringwood, and other places.

He also crossed over into New York State, even though by a law of 1700 a priest rendered himself liable to life imprisonment for attempting to enter New York while it remained under British rule. He kept a separate registry in New York of baptisms performed there. Farmer made irregular visits to the southern New York iron region, during and after the Revolution. Parish archives of Old St. Joseph's Church in Philadelphia record his trips to the Revolutionary War depot near Fishkill, New York in 1781, where he baptized over a dozen children of French-Canadian and Acadian parents. Most of the men were members of the 1st Canadian Regiment of the Continental Army, recruited in 1775 by James Livingston in anticipation of an invasion of Quebec. As the expedition failed, they, their families, and the American militias were driven out of Canada.

In 1781 and 1782, Farmer regularly celebrated Mass in the house of a German fellow-countryman in Wall Street, in a loft in Water Street, and wherever else they could find accommodation; and he practically founded St. Peter's Church. In October 1785, he founded St. Stephen's in Warwick, New York.

In 1779, Farmer was appointed one of the first trustees of the University of Pennsylvania, while as a philosopher and astronomer his reputation had reached the learned societies of Europe with whom he corresponded. He was an elected as a member of the American Philosophical Society in 1768.

=== Death ===
Farmer died in Philadelphia at the age of sixty-five, a few months after returning from a missionary trip to New York. His funeral was held at St. Mary's Church and his remains were interred in old St. Joseph's.
