= Highlands Preserve =

Park in New Jersey, United States

San Cap Park
- Interactive map of San Cap Park
- Type: County park
- Location: West Milford in New Jersey, United States
- Coordinates: 40°53′04″N 74°10′56″W
- Area: 224 acres (91 ha)
- Operator: Passaic County Parks & Recreation

Highlands Preserve (formerly San Cap Park) is a 224-acre county park that is located off Union Valley Road in West Milford Township, New Jersey, United States. It is adjacent to Abram S. Hewitt State Forest. The park provides a baseball field and three softball fields, which are located in an area leased and maintained by West Milford. The remainder of San Cap Park is geared towards passive recreation, and includes hiking trails that provide connections to the adjacent state forest. With regard to parking and transportation, the onsite parking is provided in an area leased by West Milford, and NJ Transit Bus Route 197 services the park along Warwick Turnpike.

As of April 2017, the County of Passaic has partnered with New York - New Jersey Trail Conference to begin mapping out a 5-mile network of trails with way finding signs and ADA accessible paths.
