= Scott Terry =

Scott Terry may refer to:

- Scott Terry (baseball)
- Scott Terry (musician)
