= West Milford High School =

High school in Passaic County, New Jersey, US

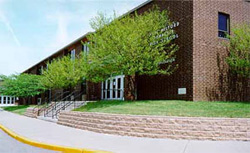
- An outside view of WMTHS

Location
- 67 Highlander Drive; West Milford, Passaic County, New Jersey 07480; United States; 41.080931°N 74.386239°W

Information
- Type: Public high school
- Established: 1962
- School district: West Milford Township Public Schools
- NCES School ID: 341752004996
- Principal: Bill Kane
- Faculty: 82.4 FTEs
- Grades: 9-12
- Enrollment: 947 (as of 2024–25)
- Student to teacher ratio: 11.5:1
- Colors: Black and gold
- Athletics conference: Big North Conference (general); North Jersey Super Football Conference (football)
- Mascot: Bucky the Deer
- Team name: Highlanders
- Rivals: Lakeland Lancers
- Accreditation: Middle States Association of Colleges and Schools
- Website: www.wmtps.org/o/wmhs

West Milford High School is a four-year comprehensive community public high school that serves students in ninth through twelfth grades from West Milford, in Passaic County, in the U.S. state of New Jersey, operating as the lone secondary school of the West Milford Township Public Schools. The school has been accredited by the Middle States Association of Colleges and Schools Commission on Elementary and Secondary Schools since 1968 and was accredited through at least January 2023.

As of the 2024–25 school year, the school had an enrollment of 947 students and 82.4 classroom teachers (on an FTE basis), for a student–teacher ratio of 11.5:1. There were 167 students (17.6% of enrollment) eligible for free lunch and 47 (5.0% of students) eligible for reduced-cost lunch.

== History ==
Students from West Milford had attended Butler High School for grades 9–12 as part of a longstanding sending/receiving relationship that existed until September 1962, when West Milford opened its own high school. The Butler Public Schools had served students from large parts of Morris and Passaic counties, until soaring local enrollment led the district to notify feeder communities in 1954 that they would have to find alternative education options for their high school students. For some time, Macopin School (now the middle school) was the only secondary school in town until the current High School was built.

== Awards, recognition, and rankings ==
The school was the 146th-ranked public high school in New Jersey out of 339 schools statewide in New Jersey Monthly magazine's September 2014 cover story on the state's "Top Public High Schools," using a new ranking methodology. The school had been ranked 163rd in the state of 328 schools in 2012, after being ranked 185th in 2010 out of 322 schools listed. The magazine ranked the school 191st in 2008 out of 316 schools. The school was ranked 169th in the magazine's September 2006 issue, which surveyed 316 schools across the state. Schooldigger.com ranked the school tied for 167th out of 381 public high schools statewide in its 2011 rankings (an increase of 48 positions from the 2010 ranking) which were based on the combined percentage of students classified as proficient or above proficient on the mathematics (80.1%) and language arts literacy (94.7%) components of the High School Proficiency Assessment (HSPA).

== Clubs and activities ==
West Milford High School offers a variety of afterschool clubs and activities for its students. These clubs are run by the student members under the supervision of WMHS staff members, thus allowing these clubs to truly by student-run. These include clubs, student-government programs, peer leadership programs, honorary societies, and scholastic competition organizations:

- West Milford High School participates in the Model Congress program. West Milford High School's Model Congress team won the Passaic County championship during the 2007–08 school year.

Highlander Marching Band

The West Milford High School Highlander Marching Band and Color Guard has won awards that include:

- 2024 USBands NJ State Champions, Group IV Open
- 2024 USBands Ludwig Musser Classic, Group IV Open Champions
- 2022 USBands NJ State Champions, Group IV A
- 2021 USBands National Champions, Group III A
- 2021 USBands NJ State Champions, Group III A
- 2018 USBands National Champions, Group V A
- 2018 USBands NJ State Champions, Group V A
- 2018 US Marine Corps Esprit de Corps Award
- 2018 USBands Yamaha Cup, Group V A Champions
- 2017 USBands NJ State Champions, Group V A
- 2017 USBands Yamaha Cup, Group V A Champions, MetLife Stadium
- 2015 USBands NJ State Champions, Group V A
- 2015 Yamaha Cup, Group V A, Champions, MetLife Stadium
- 2013 North Jersey Independent Marching Band Circuit 1st Place
- 2004–2012, 2014-2018 1st Place Randolph "Under the Stars" Competition
- 2009 & 2010 USSBA Northern States Champions, Group V A

=== Jazz ensemble ===
The jazz program at the West Milford Township School District was established in 2010. All bands are created through an audition process that encourages participation regardless of experience in the genre. With a comprehensive study of styles and history, all bands have the opportunity to participate in festivals, concerts and the creation of combos. Recent highlights of the West Milford Jazz Ensemble include six New Jersey State Finals appearances in seven years of existence; including 2nd-place finishes at the NJAJE State Jazz Finals in 2015, 2016, 2017 and 2018. In February 2017, the West Milford Jazz Ensemble participated for the first time, and was awarded 1st place at the Berklee Jazz Festival in Boston, Massachusetts. The Jazz Ensemble was also selected to perform at the National Association for Music Education All-Eastern Convention in Atlantic City.

=== Indoor percussion ===
West Milford Indoor Percussion is an extension of the Highlander Band program that combines the marching arts with the use of percussion instruments. West Milford Indoor Percussion has won numerous awards and honors. In recent years, West Milford Indoor Percussion won two USBands Division 1A Indoor Championships and is a WGI Regional Finalist.

=== Model United Nations ===
The award-winning West Milford High School Model United Nations team has achieved success in New Jersey and around the northeastern United States, and is known as a successful program in the state and this region of the country. The team, which is advised by the Supervisor of History & Social Sciences, Mr. Oliver Pruksarnukal, has attended conferences at various premier locations, including Princeton University, United Nations Headquarters (New York City), Yale University, the Historic District of Philadelphia, Saint Peter's College (Jersey City, New Jersey), Bergen County Academies (Hackensack, New Jersey), and Passaic County Law Day (Passaic County Courthouse, Paterson, NJ). The team was recognized at the 2007 United Nations Association of the United States of America (UNA-USA) International Conference with award winners for Outstanding Delegation and Honorable Delegation.

At the 2006 Princeton University Model UN Conference, West Milford won the overall team championship.

At the 2007 UNA-USA UN Headquarters International Model UN Conference, West Milford students won four awards and the team won second place overall. Two of these were for Outstanding Delegation, while the other two were for Honorable Delegation.

At the 2008 Yale University Model UN Conference, out of 50+ schools, only four of which were public, West Milford's Model UN team placed highly and enjoyed great success, taking home third place overall. West Milford won five honorable delegate awards at the conference.

West Milford students also won seven awards at the 2008 Bergen County Academies Model UN Conference, with the team taking home Outstanding School Delegation for winning the overall championship.

West Milford's Model UN team won the overall championship at the Saint Peter's College High School Model United Nations conference for the third year in a row in 2008, taking home 10 individual awards, including four for best delegate.

At the 2009 Philadelphia Model United Nations Conference, West Milford won the overall team championship and Outstanding School Delegation, while taking home six awards for individual student delegations. Two delegations won Best Delegation, two won Outstanding Delegation, and two won Distinguished Delegation.

West Milford dominated the Saint Peter's College High School Model United Nations conference for the fourth consecutive year in 2009. The team won eleven awards overall, which was nearly double the next-highest team's total, with five individual students winning for their individual delegate performance, five pairs of students winning for their delegation, and one pair winning for their position paper.

West Milford's Model UN team coordinated, hosted, and moderated the first student-run Board of Education debate in New Jersey history on April 9, 2009. The four members of the Executive Board (President, Vice President, Treasurer, Chief of Staff) were the four moderators, with the other club members serving in other capacities, including timekeepers, ushers, and concessions workers. The debate featured the five candidates for the three available Board of Education seats. The candidates were asked questions ranging in topics from the school cafeteria program to gifted education programs to how to curb substance abuse among district students to what they would want their legacy to be once their time on the Board has ended. The event was met with great praise and acclaim from the public and gave the voters of West Milford an opportunity to learn where the candidates actually stood on the critical issues affecting the students of the district.

== Athletics ==
The West Milford High School Highlanders compete in the Big North Conference, which is comprised of public and private high schools in Bergen and Passaic counties, and was established following a reorganization of sports leagues in Northern New Jersey by the New Jersey State Interscholastic Athletic Association (NJSIAA). In the 2009–10 school year, the school competed in the North Jersey Tri-County Conference, which was established on an interim basis to facilitate the realignment. Prior to the realignment, the school had participated in the Skyline Division of the Northern Hills Conference, an athletic conference that included public and private high schools located in Essex, Morris and Passaic counties. With 796 students in grades 10-12, the school was classified by the NJSIAA for the 2019–20 school year as Group III for most athletic competition purposes, which included schools with an enrollment of 761 to 1,058 students in that grade range. The football team competes in the Patriot Blue division of the North Jersey Super Football Conference, which includes 112 schools competing in 20 divisions, making it the nation's biggest football-only high school sports league. The school was classified by the NJSIAA as Group III North for football for 2024–2026, which included schools with 700 to 884 students.

The school participates as the host school / lead agency for a joint cooperative ice hockey team with Pequannock Township High School, under agreements scheduled to expire in June 2027.. The school participates in co-op boys / girls swimming teams with Lakeland Regional High School as the host school, scheduled to end in June 2028.

The school offers 28 varsity sports during the fall, winter, and spring seasons:

Fall sports offered are Cheerleading, Cross-Country (B&G), Field Hockey, Football, Gymnastics, Soccer (B&G), Tennis (G) and Volleyball (G).

Winter sports offered are Basketball (B&G), Bowling, Cheerleading, Dance Team, Fencing (B&G), Ice Hockey, Indoor Track and Field (B&G), Skiing (B&G) and Wrestling.

Spring sports offered are Baseball, Golf (B&G), Lacrosse (JV only), Outdoor Track and Field (B&G), Softball, Tennis (B) and Volleyball (B).

=== Field hockey ===
The field hockey team won the North I Group IV state sectional championship in 1985 and the North I Group III title in 2011. In 2016 and 2017, the team won the Passaic County Tournament to become back-to-back county champions.

=== Softball ===
The Highlanders softball program has won nine Passaic County Tournament titles: in 1993, 1995, 2002, 2003, 2005, 2007, 2008, 2010 and 2011. The team has also won 24 conference championships (18 in the Northern Hills Conference, plus six in its predecessor, the Skyline Conference) and eight state sectional titles in North I, Group III and North I, Group IV. The softball team has won at least 20 games in 20 consecutive seasons. Varsity Head Coach Jim Dransfield retired in 2013 with a career record of 547-108 during his 23-year tenure, ranking him among the winningest coaches in the state and the winningest all-time in North Jersey. Dransfield became the winningest softball coach in North Jersey (Bergen and Passaic Counties) with a 6–1 win over Hawthorne High School, giving him 471 for his career and moving him past former Clifton High School coach Rich LaDuke for the most all-time.

The softball program has produced two of the top ten winningest pitchers in New Jersey history: Karin Kolatac ('96) and Corinne Reiser ('00), who won 79 and 87 games during their high school careers, respectively. Kolatac was an All-American in 1996 (FP Magazine, NFCA). The program also boasts two-time FP Magazine All-American catcher Jen Pawol ('95) and DH Laura Remia ('97), the all-time leading home run hitter in the history of NCAA Division III college softball.

In 2003, the softball team won the North I, Group IV state sectional championship, edging Clifton High School 1–0 in the tournament final. The 2004 team repeated the title, after a shift to Group III, with a 4–2 win over Ramapo High School.

In the 2007 season, the softball team won the Northern Hills-Skyline championship with a 2–1 win over Mount Saint Dominic Academy, and won the Passaic County championship with a 3–1 win over Clifton High School, the eventual state Group IV champions and the #2-ranked team in New Jersey in the final poll by The Star-Ledger. The Highlanders finished the season ranked #13, after reaching as high as #2 during the regular season.

The 2008 softball team was ranked first by The Record in its preseason poll for North Jersey. The team won its second-straight county title by capping off its tournament run with a 5–2 victory over Hawthorne High School, after the team defeated rival Lakeland Regional High School by a score of 11–0 in the semi-final round. The team has competed in the Mount Saint Dominic Academy Invitational tournament, and won the conference championship for the second-straight year, after beating Mount Saint Dominic Academy by a score of 4–0, Millburn High School by a score of 7–1, and Mount Saint Dominic Academy again by a score of 2–0. The team finished the season with a record of 22–8, making it the team's 19th consecutive 20-win season.

The 2009 softball team was ranked #3 by The Record in its preseason poll for North Jersey and was ranked as high as #2 in that poll. The team was ranked as high as #6 in the Star-Ledger Top 20 poll and won 20 games for the 20th consecutive season. The team finished with a record of 20–5.

=== Boys' basketball ===
The Highlanders boys' basketball team has won four conference titles, in 1973–74, 2003–04, 2007–08, and 2008–09, and has been to three sectional championship games, in 2005–06, 2007–08, and 2008–09. The 2003–04 team went 23–3, going 16–0 in conference play, and advanced to the state sectional semi-finals where they lost to Teaneck High School. The 2005–06 team advanced to the state sectional finals before losing to Northern Valley Regional High School at Old Tappan by two points. The 2007–08 team finished with a 21–6 record and captured its third conference championship (12–2 conference record). It received the #1 seed in the state sectional tournament but lost to Wayne Valley High School in the sectional finals, 48–45. The 2008–09 team finished with a 20–7 record and captured its fourth conference championship overall and second in a row (12–2 conference record). The team made its second consecutive appearance in the sectional finals and third in four years, but lost to Teaneck High School 58–51 in overtime.

=== Girls' basketball ===
The Highlanders girls' basketball team defeated Washington Township High School by a score of 54-45 in the tournament final to win the Group IV state championship in 1995, before losing to top-seeded St. John Vianney High School by a score of 68–36 in the finals of the New Jersey Tournament of Champions.

=== Boys' cross country ===
The Highlanders boys' cross country won the North Jersey Group IV state sectional championship in 2001.

=== Girls' cross country ===
- The Highlanders girls' cross country team won State titles from 2005 to 2008.

=== Wrestling ===
- The boys' wrestling team won the North I Group IV state sectional title in 1996, 1997 and 2003.

=== Ice hockey ===
The Highlanders ice hockey program has won the won the Nardello Cup by defeating Nutley High School 2–0 in the championship game. In the 2009–2010 season, the team went the farthest into the state tournament in school history. The team defeated number one seed and 2009 state champions, Ramsey High School, by a score of 4–2. Starting in the 2018–19 season, West Milford High School and Pequannock Township High School play for a combined co-operative team.

== Administration ==
The school's principal is Bill Kane.

== Notable alumni ==
- Lennie Friedman (born 1976), former offensive lineman with the Cleveland Browns
- Billy Howerdel (born 1970), musician primarily known for his involvement with the bands Ashes Divide and A Perfect Circle
- Abha Khanna, attorney known for redistricting law and voting rights
- Samantha Kroeger (born 2002), professional soccer player who plays as midfielder for the Brooklyn FC in the USL Super League
- Steven Oroho (born 1958), politician who has represented the 24th Legislative District in the New Jersey Senate since 2008
- Jen Pawol (born 1977), baseball umpire in minor league baseball
- Dale Soules (born 1946), television and stage actress, known for appearing in Orange is the New Black
- Kevin Walker (born 1965), former linebacker for the Cincinnati Bengals
- Donna Weinbrecht (born 1965), gold medalist in mogul skiing at the 1992 Winter Olympics
