= West Milford, New Jersey =

Township in Passaic County, New Jersey, US

- Township
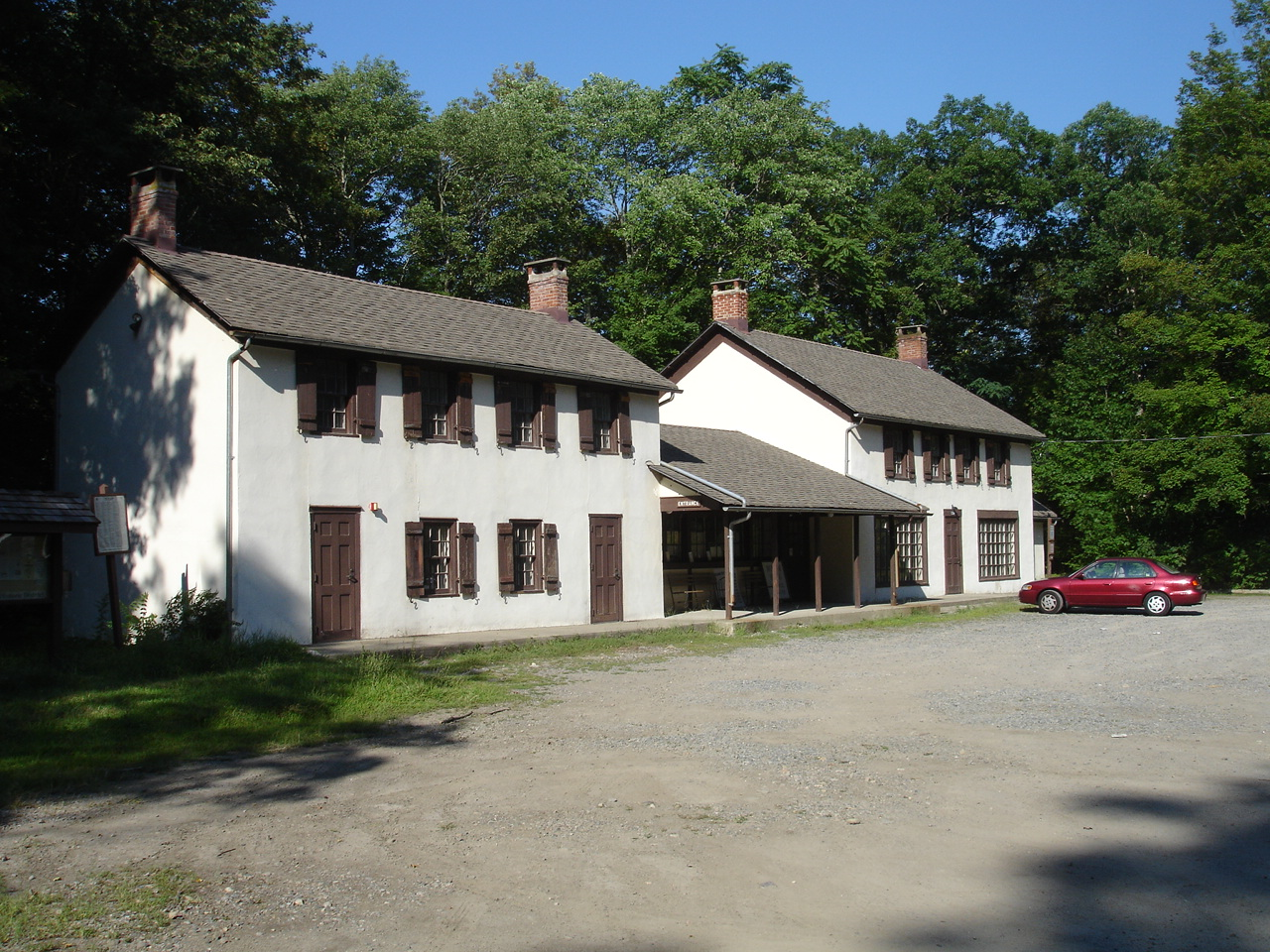
- Museum at Long Pond Ironworks

- Seal
- Motto: "A Clean Community"
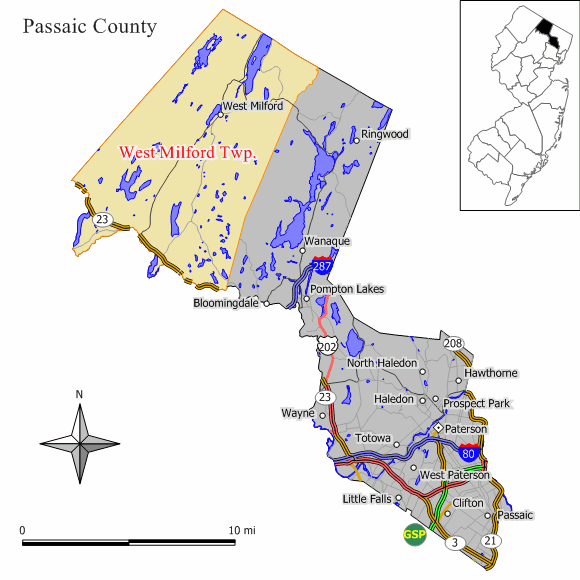
- Location of West Milford in Passaic County highlighted in yellow (left). Inset map: Location of Passaic County in New Jersey highlighted in black (right).

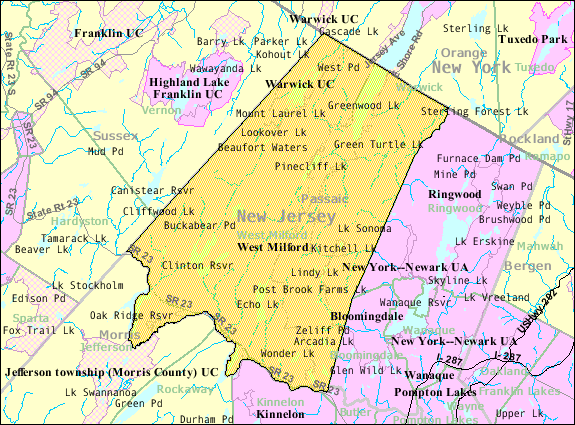
- Census Bureau map of West Milford, New Jersey

- Location in Passaic County Location in New Jersey Location in the United States
- Coordinates: 41.096517°N 74.399449°W
- Country: United States
- State: New Jersey
- County: Passaic
- Incorporated: March 10, 1834

Government
  - Type: Faulkner Act (mayor–council–administrator)
  - Body: Township Council
  - Mayor: Michele Dale (R, term ends December 31, 2023)
  - Administrator: Bill Senande
  - Municipal clerk: Bill Senande

Area
  - Total: 81.06 sq mi (209.94 km^{2})
  - Land: 75.93 sq mi (196.66 km^{2})
  - Water: 5.13 sq mi (13.28 km^{2}) 6.32%
  - Rank: 10th of 565 in state 1st of 16 in county
- Elevation: 827 ft (252 m)

Population (2020)
  - Total: 24,862
  - Estimate (2023): 24,340
  - Rank: 106th of 565 in state 5th of 16 in county
  - Density: 327.4/sq mi (126.4/km^{2})
  - Rank: 470th of 565 in state 16th of 16 in county
- Time zone: UTC−05:00 (Eastern (EST))
  - Summer (DST): UTC−04:00 (Eastern (EDT))
- ZIP Code: 07480 - West Milford; 07435 - Newfoundland; 07438 - Oak Ridge 07421 - Hewitt
- Area codes: 973 exchanges: 657, 728
- FIPS code: 3403179460
- GNIS feature ID: 0882315
- Website: www.westmilford.org

West Milford is a township in Passaic County, in the U.S. state of New Jersey. As of the 2020 United States census, the township's population was 24,862, a decrease of 988 (−3.8%) from the 2010 census count of 25,850, which in turn reflected a decline of 560 (−2.1%) from the 26,410 counted in the 2000 census. It is the largest in the county by total area, covering 80.32 square miles (208.0 km^{2}) and more than 40% of the county.

West Milford was home to a Warner Bros.-owned theme park from 1972 to 1976 entitled Warner Bros. Jungle Habitat. The 800-acre (320 ha) Jungle Habitat property, with 26 miles (42 km) of paved roads, was purchased by the state in 1988 for $1.45 million and remnants of the theme park remain until today.

== History ==
West Milford started out as New Milford in what was then western Bergen County in the 18th century, having been settled by disenchanted Dutch from Milford, New Jersey (later renamed by the British as Newark). These same Dutch also built a town of New Milford in eastern Bergen County. When both New Milfords applied for post offices in 1828, a clerk in Washington, D.C. is said to have approved the other application first and assigned the name "West Milford" to the New Milford in western Bergen County in order to distinguish between the two locations.

West Milford became a municipality by an act of the New Jersey Legislature on March 10, 1834, when it was formed from the westernmost half of Pompton Township, while the area was still part of Bergen County. On February 7, 1837, Passaic County was created from portions of both Bergen County and Essex County, with West Milford as the western end of the newly formed county. The township was named for Milford, Connecticut.

There are old place names in the township including Postville, Utterville, Corterville, Browns, Awosting, Echo Lake, Macopin, Charlottenburg (now under the Charlotteburg Reservoir, the community was named after Queen Charlotte), Clinton (or sometimes called Clinton Furnace, now under the Clinton Reservoir, and the furnace still stands), Moe Mountain, Oak Ridge (partly located in Jefferson Township), Newfoundland, Apshawa, New City, and Smith Mills. Newfoundland is divided by the Pequannock River, which divides Passaic and Morris Counties; a small part of Newfoundland lies within Jefferson Township. A large part of the township, including the New City Village area, is reservoir property owned by the City of Newark in Essex County for its water supply. Prior to the Second World War, the township was a resort area with trains coming from New York City to stations at Charlotteburg, Newfoundland, Oak Ridge in the south and Hewitt (also known as Sterling Forest station) and Awosting in the north. Railroad service in the south was from the New Jersey Midland starting around the 1850s and in the north around the 1870s from the Montclair Railroad, out of Montclair, New Jersey and later the Erie Railroad (before their merger with the Lackawanna Railroad).

Greenwood Lake is an interstate lake approximately 9 miles (14 km) long and covering 1,920 acres (780 ha), lying in both West Milford and Greenwood Lake, New York, across the New York state line. It was originally called Long Pond. It was dammed up to increase the size of the lake for water power down stream. During the resort era, several steamboats operated on the lake, the most famous and grand was the two deck steamer, Montclair. These steamboats met the trains and took passengers to the various resorts around the lake in both states.

There is a seaplane area on Greenwood Lake, a few large marinas and lakeside restaurants with docks. A public airport called Greenwood Lake Airport is located just south of the lake on top of a mountain ridge; its runway is long enough to handle small jets. There is one private airport in the township on a private estate.

After World War II and for the next 20 years the area underwent a major change from a resort area to year-round residences. Before there were year-round houses, the summer residence of Cecil B. DeMille was West Milford. Road maps of the 1950s showing the population on the backside said 2,000 winter and 10,000 summer.

In 1972, Warner Brothers opened up a wildlife theme park called Jungle Habitat, consisting of a drive-through safari and a small park with various shows. Initially, this brought many visitors to the township. Shortly after the park opened, a tourist being driven through the safari in a taxi was attacked by a lion on October 19, 1972, bringing negative publicity to the park. The park was plagued by problems, including reports of dangerous animals escaping into West Milford.

Jungle Habitat added summer and weekend traffic into this rural area made up of small two-lane roads. Jungle Habitat wanted to expand and add an amusement park, but residents concerned with excessive traffic led the township to reject the needed variances combined with declining attendance as the novelty wore off, led the company to announce the park's closure in November 1976. Some of the animals in the wildlife park were subsequently moved to the then-recently established drive-through safari at Great Adventure in Jackson Township. The former site of Jungle Habitat in recent years has become a location for various Township activities such as the annual Fourth of July Fireworks display and is a popular regional mountain biking destination.

== Geography ==
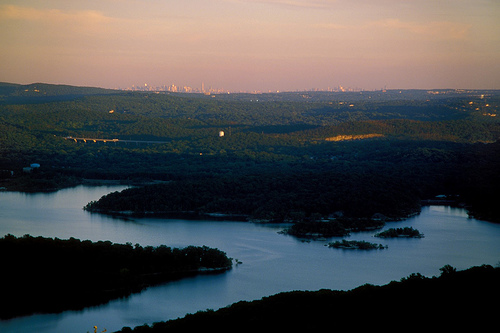
View of Wanaque Reservoir and Manhattan from a mountain near the West Milford-Ringwood border.

According to the United States Census Bureau, the township had a total area of 81.06 square miles (209.94 km^{2}), including 75.93 square miles (196.66 km^{2}) of land and 5.13 square miles (13.28 km^{2}) of water (6.32%).

Unincorporated communities, localities and place names located partially or completely within the township include Apshawa, Awosting, Bearfort Waters, Beaver Pond, Boy Scout Lake, Browns, Buckabear Pond, Camp Hope, Cedar Pond, Charlotteburg, Clinton, Clinton Reservoir, Cooper, Dunker Pond, Echo Lake, Forest Hill Lake, Fox Island, Gordon Lakes, Green Valley Park, Greenwood Lake, Greenwood Lake Glens, Hacks Pond, Henion Pond, Hewitt, Himes Pond, Lake Lockover, Lakeside, Lindy Lake, Littletown, Lower Mt. Glen Lake, Macopin, Matthews Lake, Moe, Mount Laurel Lake, Newfoundland, Oak Ridge, Pettets Pond. Pine Crest Lake, Pinecliff Lake, Postville, Shady Lake, Smiths Mills, Surprise Lake, Terrace Pond, Upper Greenwood Lake, Upper Macopin, Upper Mt. Glen Lake, Uttertown, Vreeland Pond, West Milford Lakes, West Pond, Wonder Lake and Zeliff Pond. According to Mayor Bettina Bieri, the township is "a larger geographical area consisting of numerous towns" and that "the massive territory covered by the township warrants the distinction" in place names commonly used in the township, with the four primary communities in the township being the township center, Hewitt, Newfoundland, and Oak Ridge.

The township borders the municipalities of Bloomingdale and Ringwood in Passaic County; Butler, Jefferson Township, Kinnelon and Rockaway Township in Morris County; Hardyston Township and Vernon Township in Sussex County; and Warwick in Orange County, New York.

Highlands Preserve is a 224-acre (91 ha) county park that is located off Union Valley Road and adjacent to Abram S. Hewitt State Forest.

=== Pequannock River Watershed ===
Portions of the township are owned by the City of Newark, Essex County, for its Pequannock River Watershed, which supplies water to the city from an area of 35,000 acres (14,000 ha) that also includes portions of Hardyston Township, Jefferson Township, Kinnelon, Rockaway Township and Vernon Township.

A small residential development known as "New City Village" or "New City Colony" was built on the property early in the 20th century to house workers of the Newark water supply system. It included a school and health facility. Proposed alternative uses for the village never materialized and the buildings were demolished after falling into disrepair. The land is still owned by the City of Newark.

=== Newfoundland and Green Pond ===
Newfoundland is a neighborhood of West Milford located along the New York, Susquehanna and Western Railway (NYS&W) tracks (freight service only) and Route 23. It is also a mailing address for Green Pond (just north of the Picatinny Arsenal in Rockaway Township, Morris County), a private lake community owned by Green Pond Corporation and Lake End Corporation, which lies in Rockaway Township where the Pequannock River divides Passaic County from Morris County.

The 2003 film The Station Agent was set, and filmed, largely in Newfoundland. There was an early silent movie produced in the township at the Mine Hole in the Hewitt section of the township. A still photo of that movie is published in the township's 1984 sesquicentennial book entitled The Day the Earth Shook and the Sky Turned Red.

== Demographics ==
Historical population
Census	Pop.	Note	%±
1840	2,108		—
1850	2,624		24.5%
1860	2,402		−8.5%
1870	2,660		10.7%
1880	2,591		−2.6%
1890	2,486		−4.1%
1900	2,112		−15.0%
1910	1,967		−6.9%
1920	1,763		−10.4%
1930	1,901		7.8%
1940	2,501		31.6%
1950	3,650		45.9%
1960	8,157		123.5%
1970	17,304		112.1%
1980	22,750		31.5%
1990	25,430		11.8%
2000	26,410		3.9%
2010	25,850		−2.1%
2020	24,862		−3.8%
2023 (est.)	24,340		−2.1%
Population sources: 1840–1920 1840 1850–1870; 1850 1870 1880–1890; 1890–1910 1910–1930; 1940–2000 2000; 2010 2020

=== 2020 census ===
West Milford township, Passaic County, New Jersey – Racial and Ethnic Composition (NH = Non-Hispanic) Note: the US Census treats Hispanic/Latino as an ethnic category. This table excludes Latinos from the racial categories and assigns them to a separate category. Hispanics/Latinos may be of any race.
Race / Ethnicity	Pop 2010	Pop 2020	% 2010	% 2020
White alone (NH)	23,232	20,895	89.87%	84.04%
Black or African American alone (NH)	327	320	1.26%	1.29%
Native American or Alaska Native alone (NH)	104	73	0.40%	0.29%
Asian alone (NH)	319	378	1.23%	1.52%
Pacific Islander alone (NH)	2	4	0.01%	0.02%
Some Other Race alone (NH)	24	100	0.09%	0.40%
Mixed Race/Multi-Racial (NH)	330	833	1.28%	3.35%
Hispanic or Latino (any race)	1,512	2,259	5.85%	9.09%
Total	25,850	24,862	100.00%	100.00%

=== 2010 census ===
The 2010 United States census counted 25,850 people, 9,625 households, and 7,084 families in the township. The population density was 344.3 per square mile (132.9/km^{2}). There were 10,419 housing units at an average density of 138.8 per square mile (53.6/km^{2}). The racial makeup was 94.06% (24,315) White, 1.40% (362) Black or African American, 0.52% (134) Native American, 1.29% (334) Asian, 0.02% (4) Pacific Islander, 1.06% (273) from other races, and 1.66% (428) from two or more races. Hispanic or Latino of any race were 5.85% (1,512) of the population.

Of the 9,625 households, 32.4% had children under the age of 18; 61.4% were married couples living together; 8.3% had a female householder with no husband present and 26.4% were non-families. Of all households, 21.7% were made up of individuals and 8.7% had someone living alone who was 65 years of age or older. The average household size was 2.66 and the average family size was 3.12.

22.4% of the population were under the age of 18, 7.2% from 18 to 24, 24.4% from 25 to 44, 33.4% from 45 to 64, and 12.6% who were 65 years of age or older. The median age was 42.7 years. For every 100 females, the population had 98.4 males. For every 100 females ages 18 and older there were 96.8 males.

The Census Bureau's 2006–2010 American Community Survey showed that (in 2010 inflation-adjusted dollars) median household income was $88,692 (with a margin of error of +/− $4,308) and the median family income was $102,410 (+/− $7,418). Males had a median income of $62,925 (+/− $3,467) versus $45,449 (+/− $2,738) for females. The per capita income for the borough was $37,905 (+/− $2,289). About 1.7% of families and 3.1% of the population were below the poverty line, including 3.5% of those under age 18 and 5.2% of those age 65 or over.

Same-sex couples headed 63 households in 2010, an increase from the 58 counted in 2000.

=== 2000 census ===
As of the 2000 United States census there were 26,410 people, 9,190 households, and 7,186 families residing in the township. The population density was 350.1 inhabitants per square mile (135.2/km^{2}). There were 9,909 housing units at an average density of 131.4 per square mile (50.7/km^{2}). The racial makeup of the township was 95.08% White, 1.23% African American, 0.60% Native American, 1.02% Asian, 0.61% from other races, and 1.45% from two or more races. Hispanic or Latino of any race were 3.38% of the population.

There were 9,190 households, out of which 39.9% had children under the age of 18 living with them, 67.3% were married couples living together, 7.8% had a female householder with no husband present, and 21.8% were non-families. 16.7% of all households were made up of individuals, and 5.5% had someone living alone who was 65 years of age or older. The average household size was 2.84 and the average family size was 3.23.

In the township the population was spread out, with 27.2% under the age of 18, 6.0% from 18 to 24, 33.6% from 25 to 44, 24.8% from 45 to 64, and 8.4% who were 65 years of age or older. The median age was 37 years. For every 100 females, there were 100.3 males. For every 100 females age 18 and over, there were 97.4 males.

The median income for a household in the township was $74,124, and the median income for a family was $80,264. Males had a median income of $51,105 versus $37,159 for females. The per capita income for the township was $28,612. About 2.6% of families and 4.1% of the population were below the poverty line, including 6.1% of those under age 18 and 2.9% of those age 65 or over.

== Economy ==
West Milford businesses are represented by the West Milford Chamber of Commerce, an organization of business men and women that has worked to improve and enhance the business community in West Milford since it was established in 1949.

The Abby Theater opened in 1976 and was designed by Milton Herson for Music Makers Theaters, with a seating capacity of 1,400. The theater was named for Abby Leigh, wife of Mitch Leigh, then board chairman of Music Makers. The Abby Theater closed down in 2009 after several unsuccessful business attempts, as the township did not have enough residents to keep the business in operation. It was slated to be demolished in order to make room for an expansion of the ShopRite supermarket in 2012.

In May 2009, Eden Farms, an 8-acre (3.2 ha) floral farm on Union Valley Road, became the first "preserved farm" in Passaic County. County officials used money from the Farmland Preservation Funds to purchase development rights to the farm. Owners George and Diana Cluff initially began working on the agreement in 2007. The deal prevents the farm from being built upon.

== Sports ==
West Milford sports are overseen by the township department of Community Services and Recreation. The township has individual organizations that run each youth sports program, including: Junior wrestling, Youth Lacrosse, Little League Baseball (WMLL), Police Athletic League (PAL) Basketball, PAL Soccer, West Milford-Star Athletics Cheerleading, Midget Football Association (WMMFA) Football, WMMFA Cheerleading, Amateur Baseball Association (WMABA) Baseball, and Girls Softball Association softball (WMGSA).

== Parks and recreation ==
Norvin Green State Forest covers 5,416 acres (2,192 ha) in parts of West Milford, as well as portions of Bloomingdale and Ringwood.

== Government ==
=== Local government ===
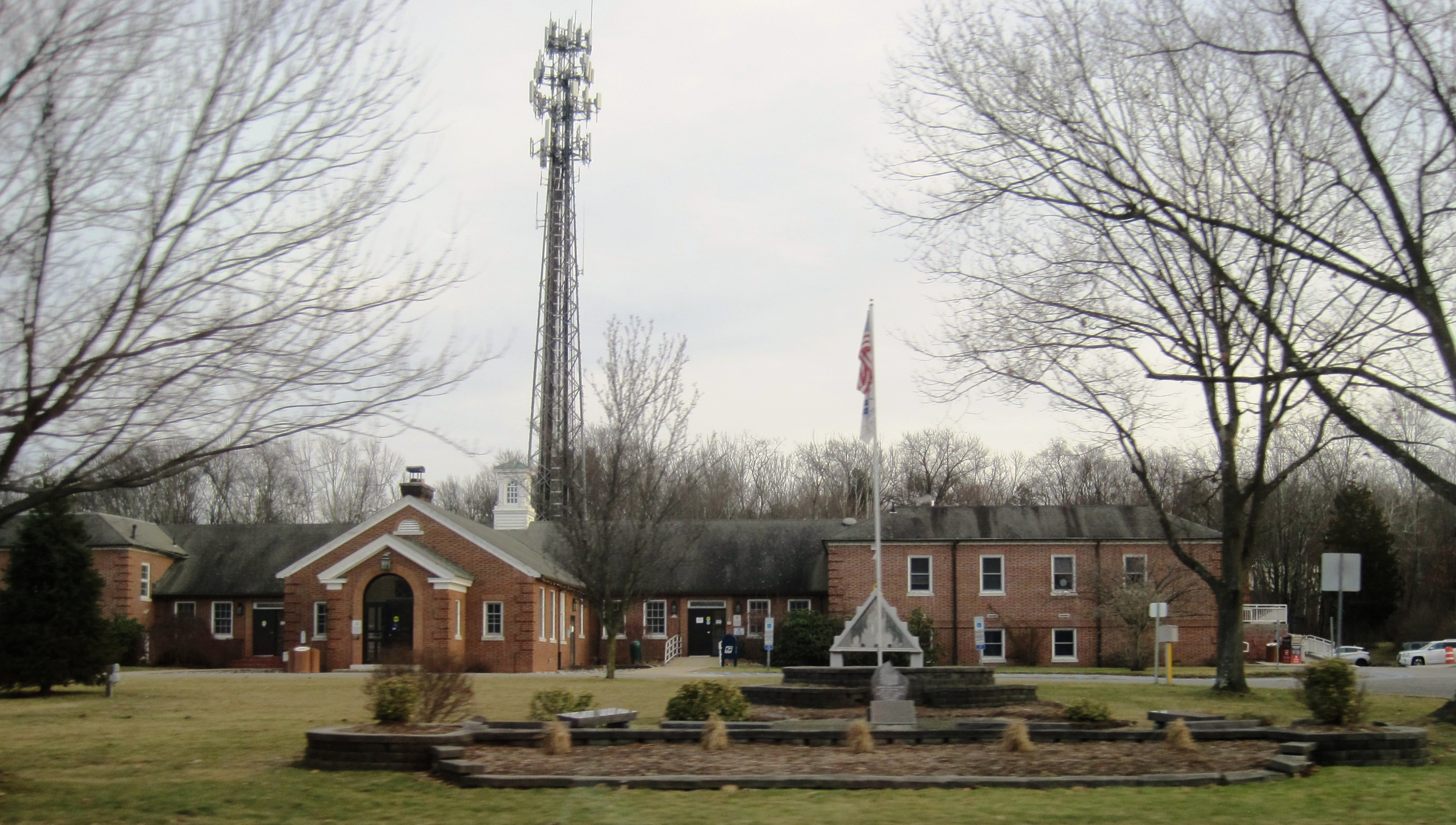
West Milford municipal building

The Township of West Milford operates under the Faulkner Act, formally known as the Optional Municipal Charter Law, under the Mayor-Council-Administrator plan adopted as of January 1, 2004. This plan is described as a "Faulknerized" version of the borough form of government, which was added to the Faulkner Act as the fourth optional form of municipal government in 1981 by the New Jersey Legislature. The township is one of three (of the 564) municipalities statewide that use this form of government. The voters of West Milford Township adopted the Mayor-Council-Administrator Plan at a special election held on December 10, 2002. Under the mayor-council-administrator plan, the governing body is comprised of the Mayor and the Township Council, with all positions elected at-large on a partisan basis as part of the November general election. The Township Council includes six members elected to serve three-year terms on a staggered basis, with two seats coming up for election each year. A municipal administrator is appointed to oversee the day-to-day operation of the township. The Mayor is elected directly by the voters to a four-year term of office.

As of 2023, the Mayor of West Milford Township is Republican Michele A. Dale, whose term of office ends December 31, 2023. Members of the Township Council are Council President Kevin L. Goodsir (R, 2025), Michael Chazukow (R, 2023), Matthew P. Conlon (R, 2025), Ada Erik (R, 2024), Marilyn Lichtenberg (R, 2024) and David S. Marsden (R, 2023).

In December 2019, the Township Committee unanimously passed a non-binding resolution declaring West Milford to be a "Second Amendment sanctuary" that opposes the enforcement of gun control on the local level, becoming the first municipality in the state to do so.

=== Federal, state and county representation ===
West Milford is located in the 5th Congressional District and is part of New Jersey's 25th state legislative district.

For the 119th United States Congress, New Jersey's 5th congressional district is represented by Josh Gottheimer (D, Wyckoff). New Jersey is represented in the United States Senate by Democrats Cory Booker (Newark, term ends 2027) and Andy Kim (Moorestown, term ends 2031).

For the 2026–2027 session, the 25th legislative district of the New Jersey Legislature is represented in the State Senate by Anthony M. Bucco (R, Boonton Township) and in the General Assembly by Aura K. Dunn (R, Mendham Borough) and Marisa Sweeney (D, Morristown).

Passaic County is governed by a Board of County Commissioners, comprised of seven members who are elected at-large to staggered three-year terms office on a partisan basis, with two or three seats coming up for election each year as part of the November general election in a three-year cycle. At a reorganization meeting held in January, the board selects a Director and Deputy Director from among its members to serve for a one-year term. As of 2026, Passaic County's Commissioners are: Director Cassandra "Sandi" Lazzara (D), Little Falls, term as commissioner ends December 31, 2027; term as director ends 2026), Deputy Director Orlando Cruz (D, Paterson, term as commissioner and as deputy director ends 2026), Rodney DeVore (D, Paterson, 2027), Bruce James (D, Clifton, 2026) Michael Ramaglia (D, West Milford, 2028), Christina Schratz (D, Passaic, 2028) and Nick Veliky (D, Clifton, appointed to a term ending in 2027).

Constitutional officers, elected on a countywide basis, are County Clerk Danielle Ireland-Imhof (D, Hawthorne, 2028), Sheriff Thomas Adamo (D, Wayne, 2027) and Surrogate Zoila S. Cassanova (D, Wayne, 2026).

Each of the four primary communities in the township has a post office.

=== Highlands protection ===
In 2004, the New Jersey Legislature passed the Highlands Water Protection and Planning Act, which regulates the New Jersey Highlands region. West Milford was included in the highlands preservation area and is subject to the rules of the act and the Highlands Water Protection and Planning Council, a division of the New Jersey Department of Environmental Protection. All of the territory in the protected region is classified as being in the highlands preservation area, and thus subject to additional rules.

=== Politics ===
As of March 2011, there were a total of 17,588 registered voters in West Milford, of which 3,397 (19.3% vs. 31.0% countywide) were registered as Democrats, 5,070 (28.8% vs. 18.7%) were registered as Republicans and 9,111 (51.8% vs. 50.3%) were registered as Unaffiliated. There were 10 voters registered as Libertarians or Greens. Among the township's 2010 Census population, 68.0% (vs. 53.2% in Passaic County) were registered to vote, including 87.7% of those ages 18 and over (vs. 70.8% countywide).

Gubernatorial election results for West Milford
Year	Republican		Democratic		Third party(ies)	
Year	No.	%	No.	%	No.	%
2025	6,621	58.74%	4,593	40.75%	57	0.51%
2021	6,207	65.72%	3,157	33.43%	81	0.86%
2017	4,494	57.81%	3,034	39.03%	246	3.16%
2013	5,380	69.28%	2,264	29.15%	122	1.57%
2009	5,261	61.25%	2,720	31.66%	609	7.09%
2005	4,542	55.67%	3,360	41.18%	257	3.15%

In the 2012 presidential election, Republican Mitt Romney received 58.4% of the vote (7,003 cast), ahead of Democrat Barack Obama with 40.3% (4,832 votes), and other candidates with 1.3% (154 votes), among the 12,074 ballots cast by the township's 18,268 registered voters (85 ballots were spoiled), for a turnout of 66.1%. In the 2008 presidential election, Republican John McCain received 7,672 votes (56.5% vs. 37.7% countywide), ahead of Democrat Barack Obama with 5,515 votes (40.6% vs. 58.8%) and other candidates with 161 votes (1.2% vs. 0.8%), among the 13,575 ballots cast by the township's 18,016 registered voters, for a turnout of 75.3% (vs. 70.4% in Passaic County). In the 2004 presidential election, Republican George W. Bush received 7,920 votes (60.9% vs. 42.7% countywide), ahead of Democrat John Kerry with 4,783 votes (36.8% vs. 53.9%) and other candidates with 109 votes (0.8% vs. 0.7%), among the 13,000 ballots cast by the township's 16,932 registered voters, for a turnout of 76.8% (vs. 69.3% in the whole county).

Presidential elections results
Year	Republican	Democratic	Third Parties
2024	61.3% 9,131	36.7% 5,471	2.0% 251
2020	58.6% 9,259	38.8% 6,127	2.6% 295
2016	62.0% 8,098	33.1% 4,325	3.9% 512
2012	58.4% 7,003	40.3% 4,832	1.3% 154
2008	56.5% 7,672	40.6% 5,515	1.2% 161
2004	60.9% 7,920	36.8% 4,783	0.8% 109

In the 2013 gubernatorial election, Republican Chris Christie received 69.3% of the vote (5,380 cast), ahead of Democrat Barbara Buono with 29.2% (2,264 votes), and other candidates with 1.6% (122 votes), among the 7,885 ballots cast by the township's 18,420 registered voters (119 ballots were spoiled), for a turnout of 42.8%. In the 2009 gubernatorial election, Republican Chris Christie received 5,261 votes (60.8% vs. 43.2% countywide), ahead of Democrat Jon Corzine with 2,720 votes (31.5% vs. 50.8%), Independent Chris Daggett with 525 votes (6.1% vs. 3.8%) and other candidates with 84 votes (1.0% vs. 0.9%), among the 8,646 ballots cast by the township's 17,322 registered voters, yielding a 49.9% turnout (vs. 42.7% in the county).

United States Senate election results for West Milford1
Year	Republican		Democratic		Third party(ies)	
Year	No.	%	No.	%	No.	%
2024	8,636	60.71%	5,237	36.82%	351	2.47%
2018	6,259	59.37%	3,550	33.67%	734	6.96%
2012	6,105	56.28%	4,483	41.33%	260	2.40%
2006	4,613	59.16%	3,013	38.64%	171	2.19%

United States Senate election results for West Milford2
Year	Republican		Democratic		Third party(ies)	
Year	No.	%	No.	%	No.	%
2020	8,947	58.30%	5,950	38.77%	449	2.93%
2014	3,853	59.12%	2,475	37.98%	189	2.90%
2013	2,977	62.20%	1,766	36.90%	43	0.90%
2008	6,888	56.21%	5,088	41.52%	279	2.28%

== Education ==
The West Milford Township Public Schools serve students in pre-kindergarten through twelfth grade at its five elementary schools (grades K–5), one middle school (grade 6–8) and one high school (grades 9–12). As of the 2021–22 school year, the district, comprised of eight schools, had an enrollment of 3,028 students and 279.2 classroom teachers (on an FTE basis), for a student–teacher ratio of 10.8:1. Schools in the district (with 2021–22 enrollment data from the National Center for Education Statistics) are Apshawa Elementary School with 999 students in grades K-5, Maple Road Elementary School with 231 students in grades PreK-5, Marshall Hill Elementary School with 251 students in grades K-5, Paradise Knoll Elementary School with 192 students in grades K-5, Upper Greenwood Lake Elementary School with 192 students in grades K-5, Macopin Middle School with 777 students in grades 6-8 and West Milford High School with 936 students in grades 9–12. Westbrook Elementary School, which had 238 students in grades K-5 in 2021–22, was closed for the start of the 2023–24 school year.

Our Lady Queen of Peace was a Catholic school located in the community of Hewitt until it was closed in June 2010 by the Roman Catholic Diocese of Paterson in the face of declining enrollment. OLQP School celebrated its 50th anniversary in 2009, and had its Fourth Grade teacher, Lorraine Ford, named as a finalist for the 2008 New Jersey Nonpublic School Teacher of the Year award.

High school students also have the option of attending Passaic County Technical Institute, a public vocational high school that serves selected students throughout Passaic County.

The old Newfoundland, two-room schoolhouse was the Village Square Inn Restaurant until it closed in 2010. The old Hillcrest School was formerly the township's community center. The few one-room schoolhouses are all gone; the last one was the Hewitt School, destroyed by fire set by vandals (it had been the former Methodist church before a new, larger church was built).

== Transportation ==
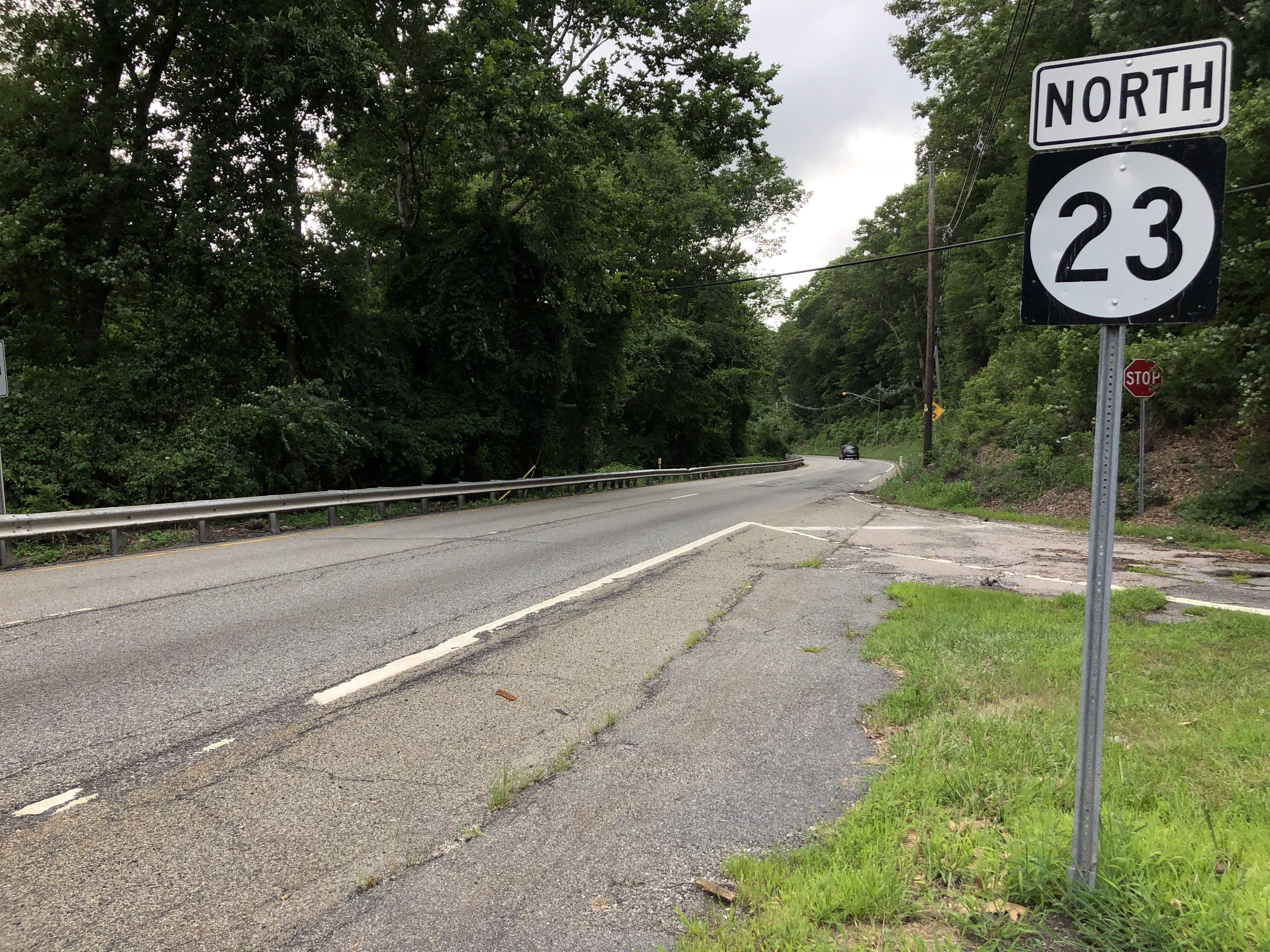
Route 23 northbound in West Milford

=== Roads and highways ===
As of May 2010, the township had a total of 198.30 miles (319.13 km) of roadways, of which 163.20 miles (262.64 km) were maintained by the municipality, 26.61 miles (42.82 km) by Passaic County and 8.49 miles (13.66 km) by the New Jersey Department of Transportation.

The main highway serving West Milford is Route 23. Other significant roads passing through the township include County Route 511 and County Route 513.

The stoplight at the intersection of Clinton Road and Route 23 has been identified by The New York Times as the longest red cycle in the United States. Drivers can wait up to 5 minutes and 33 seconds to turn onto Route 23 from Clinton Road.

=== Railroad ===
The New Jersey Midland Railway ran a trackage right-of-way through West Milford in 1872 developing the Newfoundland Station, which and later served passengers on the New York, Susquehanna and Western Railroad (NYS&W), which still serves freight along the line

=== Public transportation ===
NJ Transit provides bus service between the township and the Port Authority Bus Terminal in Midtown Manhattan on the 194 and 196 routes.

The township provides its own bus service, on two routes. One that runs by Upper Greenwood Lake, and operates Monday-Friday, and one that runs between Oak Ridge & Newfoundland, which runs Wednesdays only.

== In popular culture ==
Portions of the 2015 made-for-television comedy Simpler Times—starring Jerry Stiller and Anne Meara, and written / directed by Steve Monarque—were filmed in West Milford.

In 2019, the film Clinton Road, starring Ice-T, was made based on the infamous 10-mile (16 km) stretch of supposedly "haunted" road in the Newfoundland and Hewitt sections of West Milford.

The first segment of the 2025 anthology film Father Mother Sister Brother was filmed in West Milford.

== Notable people ==
People who were born in, residents of, or otherwise closely associated with West Milford include:

- Charles L. Banks (1914–1988), Marine Corps general and Navy Cross recipient
- Chuck Burgi (born 1952), drummer and session musician
- Jasper Francis Cropsey (1823–1900), Hudson River School landscape painter, referred to as "America's Painter of Autumn"
- Lennie Friedman (born 1976), offensive lineman with the Cleveland Browns
- Sam Garnes (born 1974), former safety for the New York Giants and New York Jets
- Jeremy Glick (1970–2001), passenger and hero on United Flight 93 during the September 11 terrorist attacks
- Larry Hand (born 1940), defensive end and defensive tackle who played for the Detroit Lions from 1965 to 1977
- Billy Howerdel (born 1970), founding member, guitarist, songwriter, and producer for the bands A Perfect Circle and Ashes Divide
- Derek Jeter (born 1974), shortstop for the New York Yankees
- Steven V. Oroho (born 1958), politician who has represented the 24th Legislative District in the New Jersey Senate since 2008
- Carol-Lynn Parente (born 1963), executive producer of Sesame Street and winner of seven Emmy Awards for her work on the program
- Laurene Powell Jobs (born 1963), widow of Steve Jobs and founder and chair of Emerson Collective
- Jen Pawol (born 1977), first female umpire in Major League Baseball history.
- Danielle Rose Russell (born 1999), actress who has starred in The Originals and its spin-off, Legacies
- Dale Soules (born 1946), actress who appeared in Orange Is the New Black
- Scott Terry (born 1976), songwriter and singer who has been lead singer of Red Wanting Blue
- Kevin Walker (born 1965), former linebacker for the Cincinnati Bengals
- Donna Weinbrecht (born 1965), woman who won the first gold medal awarded in the first Olympic mogul competitions
- Tom Wopat (born 1951), actor who played Luke Duke in The Dukes of Hazzard

== See also ==
- Second Amendment sanctuary
