= Kevin Walker (linebacker) =

American football player (born 1965)

No. 59
- Position: Linebacker

Personal information
- Born: December 24, 1965 (age 60); Denville Township, New Jersey, U.S.
- Listed height: 6 ft 2 in (1.88 m)
- Listed weight: 238 lb (108 kg)

Career information
- High school: West Milford (West Milford, New Jersey)
- College: Maryland
- NFL draft: 1988: 3rd round, 57th overall pick

Career history
- Cincinnati Bengals (1988–1992)

Awards and highlights
- First-team All-ACC (1987)

Career NFL statistics
- Sacks: 2
- Fumble recoveries: 1
- Stats at Pro Football Reference

Kevin Walker (born December 24, 1965) is an American former professional football player who was a linebacker for the Cincinnati Bengals of the National Football League (NFL). Walker is most notable for making the tackle that ultimately ended the career of Bo Jackson. He went to West Milford High School in West Milford, New Jersey.

== Professional career ==
Walker was selected 57th overall by the Cincinnati Bengals out of the University of Maryland in the 1988 NFL draft. Walker was a regular throughout the 1989 and 1990 seasons and was a part of the Cincinnati Bengals team that reached Super Bowl XXIII. During the 1990 playoffs, Walker made a routine tackle on Los Angeles Raiders star running back Bo Jackson that caused a serious hip injury that ended Jackson's football career.

Walker's career came to an end with an injury of his own torn knee ligament during a game against the Seattle Seahawks. Walker had previously injured a knee during the 1988 season.
