= Lennie Friedman =

American football player (born 1976)

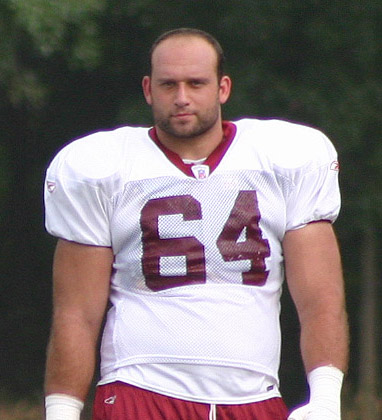
- Friedman with the Washington Redskins in 2005

No. 64, 62
- Position: Guard

Personal information
- Born: October 13, 1976 (age 50); Livingston, New Jersey, U.S.
- Listed height: 6 ft 3 in (1.91 m)
- Listed weight: 290 lb (132 kg)

Career information
- High school: West Milford (NJ)
- College: Duke
- NFL draft: 1999: 2nd round, 61st overall pick

Career history
- Denver Broncos (1999–2002); → Barcelona Dragons (2000); Washington Redskins (2003–2005); Chicago Bears (2005); Cleveland Browns (2006–2008)

Awards and highlights
- All-NFL Europe (2000)

Career NFL statistics
- Games played: 97
- Games started: 34
- Fumble recoveries: 3
- Stats at Pro Football Reference

Leonard Lebrecht Friedman (born October 13, 1976) is an American former professional guard in the National Football League (NFL). He played college football for the Duke Blue Devils. He was selected by the Denver Broncos in the second round of the 1999 NFL draft. Friedman also played for the Washington Redskins, Chicago Bears, and Cleveland Browns.

== Early and personal life ==
Friedman was born in Livingston, New Jersey, to Mike and Sandi Friedman, and is Jewish. He attended West Milford High School in West Milford, New Jersey, where he played football and was also co-captain on a track and field team that went undefeated all four years. In high school, he also played in the Maccabi Youth Games. He and his wife, Katie, have three children and make their off-season home in North Carolina.

== College career ==
At Duke University, Friedman was a three-year starter at left guard, and as a senior, he won first-team All-Atlantic Coast Conference honors from the Sporting News. He earned a degree in psychology.

== Professional career ==
=== Denver Broncos ===
He was selected by the Denver Broncos in the second round (61st overall) in the 1999 NFL draft. He saw no action in his rookie season as he tore his left anterior cruciate ligament during pre-season.

He was allocated to NFL Europe where he played for the Barcelona Dragons. He returned to training camp and during the season played in all 16 games including eight starts. He made his first NFL start at the Cincinnati Bengals on October 22.

During the 2001 season Friedman played in 15 games and made 14 starts at the left guard position. He only played in two games for the Broncos in 2002.

=== Washington Redskins ===
He signed for the Washington Redskins as an unrestricted free agent on March 5. He played in all 16 regular season games and made eight starts. He made his first career start at center versus the Seattle Seahawks on November 9.

He played in five games for the Redskins in 2004 and made two starts. Friedman played in the opening ten games for the Redskins, but was waived on November 23.

=== Chicago Bears ===
He was signed by the Chicago Bears as a free agent on November 29 and played in one game at the Minnesota Vikings on January 1. Friedman was traded by the Bears to the Cleveland Browns in exchange for a conditional draft choice on August 24, 2006.

=== Cleveland Browns ===
In 2006, Friedman played in all 16 games and made two starts. He played a number of positions including guard and center as well as making contributions to special teams. In 2007, Friedman played in all 16 games for the Browns; also used as an extra linemen in goal line packages.

=== Honors ===
In 2004, he was inducted into the National Jewish Sports Hall of Fame and Museum.

== Post-NFL career ==
Friedman studied for and received an MBA from Duke University's Fuqua School of Business after he concluded his professional football career.

== See also ==
- List of select Jewish football players
