= Upper Greenwood Lake, New Jersey =

Populated place in Passaic and Sussex counties, New Jersey, US

- Census-designated place
- Location in Passaic County Location in Sussex County Location in New Jersey Location in the United States
- Coordinates: 41°11′0″N 74°22′48″W
- Country: United States
- State: New Jersey
- County: Passaic, Sussex
- Townships: West Milford; Vernon

Area
  - Total: 3.16 sq mi (8.19 km^{2})
  - Land: 2.74 sq mi (7.09 km^{2})
  - Water: 0.42 sq mi (1.09 km^{2})
- Elevation: 1,110 ft (340 m)

Population (2020)
  - Total: 3,687
  - Density: 1,346.1/sq mi (519.72/km^{2})
- Time zone: UTC−05:00 (Eastern (EST))
  - Summer (DST): UTC−04:00 (EDT)
- ZIP Code: 07421 (Hewitt)
- Area codes: 973/862
- FIPS code: 34-74930
- GNIS feature ID: 2806211

Upper Greenwood Lake is a census-designated place (CDP) in Passaic and Sussex counties, in the U.S. state of New Jersey. As of the 2020 census, Upper Greenwood Lake had a population of 3,687. It includes residential neighborhoods around the northern and central parts of its namesake lake. It is primarily in West Milford Township in Passaic County but extends to the northwest into Vernon Township in Sussex County. It is bordered to the west by Wawayanda State Park, to the southeast by Abram S. Hewitt State Forest, and to the northeast by the town of Warwick in Orange County, New York.

The lake drains to the northeast into Long House Creek, which descends into New York and joins Wawayanda Creek, a west-flowing tributary of Pochuck Creek, which in turn runs north to the Wallkill River, a northeast-flowing tributary of the Hudson.

== Demographics ==
Historical population
Census	Pop.	Note	%±
1970	1,505		—
1980	2,734		81.7%
2020	3,687		—
U.S. Decennial Census; 1950 1960 1970; 1980 1990 2000; 2010 2020

Upper Greenwood Lake was listed as an unincorporated community in the 1970 U.S. census; and then as a census designated place in the 1980 U.S. census. It was merged into the West Milford CDP prior to the 1990 U.S. census. It did not appear in subsequent censuses until it again was named a CDP in the 2020 U.S. census.

=== 2020 census ===
As of the 2020 census, Upper Greenwood Lake had a population of 3,687. The median age was 44.7 years. 19.7% of residents were under the age of 18 and 13.4% were 65 years of age or older. For every 100 females there were 106.7 males, and for every 100 females age 18 and over there were 105.3 males age 18 and over.

0.0% of residents lived in urban areas, while 100.0% lived in rural areas.

There were 1,464 households, of which 27.7% had children under the age of 18 living in them. Of all households, 57.2% were married-couple households, 18.2% were households with a male householder and no spouse or partner present, and 16.4% were households with a female householder and no spouse or partner present. About 21.4% of all households were made up of individuals and 6.4% had someone living alone who was 65 years of age or older.

There were 1,661 housing units, of which 11.9% were vacant. The homeowner vacancy rate was 2.4% and the rental vacancy rate was 9.1%.

Upper Greenwood Lake CDP, New Jersey – Racial and ethnic composition Note: the US Census treats Hispanic/Latino as an ethnic category. This table excludes Latinos from the racial categories and assigns them to a separate category. Hispanics/Latinos may be of any race.
Race / Ethnicity (NH = Non-Hispanic)	Pop 2020	2020
White alone (NH)	3,026	82.07%
Black or African American alone (NH)	85	2.31%
Native American or Alaska Native alone (NH)	23	0.62%
Asian alone (NH)	55	1.49%
Native Hawaiian or Pacific Islander alone (NH)	0	0.00%
Other race alone (NH)	15	0.41%
Mixed race or Multiracial (NH)	150	4.07%
Hispanic or Latino (any race)	333	9.03%
Total	3,687	100.00%

== Education ==
The respective school districts are West Milford Township Public Schools for sections in West Milford Township, Passaic County; and Vernon Township School District for sections in Vernon Township, Sussex County.
