= Greenwood Lake Airport =

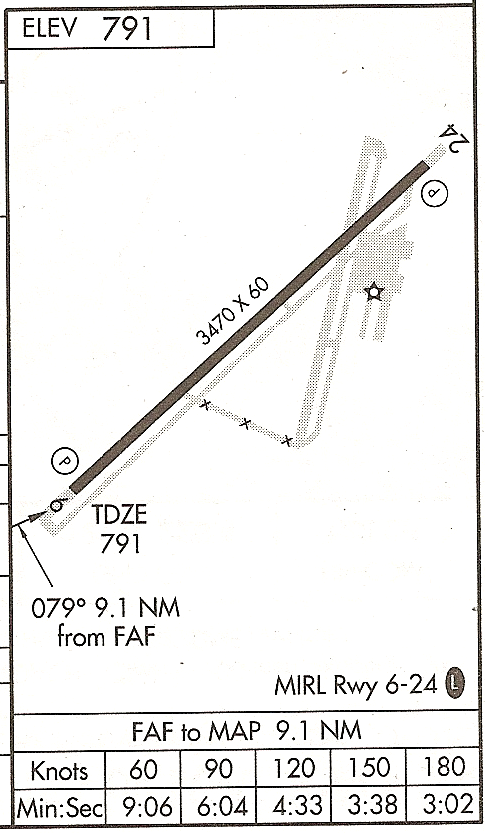
- IATA: none; ICAO: none; FAA LID: 4N1

Summary
- Airport type: Public
- Owner: New Jersey Department of Transportation
- Serves: West Milford, New Jersey
- Location: Passaic County
- Elevation AMSL: 790 ft (240 m)
- Coordinates: 41°07′42″N 074°20′48″W

Map
- Interactive map of Greenwood Lake Airport

Runways
Direction	Length		Surface
Direction	ft	m	Surface
6/24	3,471	1,058	Asphalt

Statistics (2010)
- Aircraft operations: 18,099
- Based aircraft: 64
- Source: Federal Aviation Administration

Greenwood Lake Airport (FAA LID: 4N1) is a public use airport located one nautical mile (2 km) east of the central business district of West Milford, in Passaic County, New Jersey, United States. The airport is owned by New Jersey Department of Transportation. It is included in the National Plan of Integrated Airport Systems for 2011–2015, which categorized it as a general aviation facility.

An old Lockheed Constellation sits on the ramp. This aircraft is no longer flyable, and has been built into part of the terminal building and houses an office for Sky Training LLC.

== Facilities and aircraft ==
Greenwood Lake Airport covers an area of 150 acres (61 ha) at an elevation of 790 feet (241 m) above mean sea level. It has one runway designated 6/24 with an asphalt surface measuring 3,471 by 60 feet (1,058 x 18 m).

For the 12-month period ending March 25, 2010, the airport had 18,099 general aviation aircraft operations, an average of 49 per day. At that time there were 64 aircraft based at this airport: 91% single-engine, 6% multi-engine, 2% helicopter, and 2% ultralight.

== Trivia ==
When Jungle Habitat was opened in 1972, the on-field FBO offered aerial tours in Cessna 152 and Cessna 172 aircraft painted with tiger and leopard stripes.

== See also ==
- List of airports in New Jersey
