= Macopin, New Jersey =

Populated place in Passaic County, New Jersey, US

- Census-designated place
- Location in Passaic County Location in New Jersey Location in the United States
- Coordinates: 41°03′08″N 74°23′20″W
- Country: United States
- State: New Jersey
- County: Passaic
- Township: West Milford

Area
  - Total: 6.47 sq mi (16.76 km^{2})
  - Land: 6.14 sq mi (15.89 km^{2})
  - Water: 0.33 sq mi (0.86 km^{2})
- Elevation: 1,004 ft (306 m)

Population (2020)
  - Total: 2,199
  - Density: 358.4/sq mi (138.36/km^{2})
- ZIP Code: 07480
- FIPS code: 34-42450
- GNIS feature ID: 0878011

Macopin is an unincorporated community and census-designated place (CDP) located within West Milford in Passaic County, in the U.S. state of New Jersey. As of the 2020 census, Macopin had a population of 2,199. The area is served as United States Postal Service ZIP Code 07480.

== Demographics ==
Historical population
Census	Pop.	Note	%±
2020	2,199		—
U.S. Decennial Census

Macopin was first listed as a census designated place in the 2020 U.S. census.

=== 2020 census ===
As of the 2020 census, Macopin had a population of 2,199. The median age was 44.2 years. 20.9% of residents were under the age of 18 and 15.6% of residents were 65 years of age or older. For every 100 females there were 101.6 males, and for every 100 females age 18 and over there were 99.5 males age 18 and over.

46.3% of residents lived in urban areas, while 53.7% lived in rural areas.

There were 794 households in Macopin, of which 33.2% had children under the age of 18 living in them. Of all households, 59.7% were married-couple households, 17.0% were households with a male householder and no spouse or partner present, and 17.4% were households with a female householder and no spouse or partner present. About 18.5% of all households were made up of individuals and 8.2% had someone living alone who was 65 years of age or older.

There were 871 housing units, of which 8.8% were vacant. The homeowner vacancy rate was 2.7% and the rental vacancy rate was 13.1%.

Macopin CDP, New Jersey – Racial and ethnic composition Note: the US Census treats Hispanic/Latino as an ethnic category. This table excludes Latinos from the racial categories and assigns them to a separate category. Hispanics/Latinos may be of any race.
Race / Ethnicity (NH = Non-Hispanic)	Pop 2020	2020
White alone (NH)	1,825	82.99%
Black or African American alone (NH)	36	1.64%
Native American or Alaska Native alone (NH)	8	0.36%
Asian alone (NH)	34	1.55%
Native Hawaiian or Pacific Islander alone (NH)	0	0.00%
Other race alone (NH)	10	0.45%
Mixed race or Multiracial (NH)	78	3.55%
Hispanic or Latino (any race)	208	9.46%
Total	2,199	100.00%

=== 2000 census ===
As of the 2000 United States census, the population for ZIP Code Tabulation Area 07480 was 16,029.
