= Warner Bros. Jungle Habitat =

Former theme park

- Interactive map of Warner Bros. Jungle Habitat
- Location: West Milford, New Jersey, United States
- Coordinates: 41°07′48″N 74°20′27″W
- Status: Defunct
- Opened: July 19, 1972; 54 years ago
- Closed: October 31, 1976; 50 years ago
- Owner: Warner Bros.
- Theme: Natural environment and animal conservation

Warner Bros. Jungle Habitat, which was in West Milford, in Passaic County, New Jersey, United States, was a Warner Bros.-owned theme park that opened in the summer of 1972, and closed in October 1976. By November 1972, the park had 500,000 paid visitors. The park contained over 1,500 animals, and consisted of a drive-through section and a walk-through section.

== History ==
The park featured a drive-through safari section, which allowed for wild animals to roam free and approach vehicles as they slowly drove through. Drivers and their passenger(s) could observe peacocks, baboons, camels, elephants, llamas, giraffes, African lions and Siberian tigers in this section, either in their cars or on a Jungle Habitat bus. Many of the animals would climb atop the cars, and/or walk in front of vehicles, bringing them to a halt. Signs were posted along the route to warn visitors to keep their windows closed.

The walk-through section, named Jungle Junction, was a small theme park which included a petting zoo, camel and elephant rides, snack bars, gift shop, a reptile house, a dolphin show, a small tram station, and Bugs Bunny and Friends live shows with Warner Bros.' Looney Tunes characters, including Bugs Bunny, Daffy Duck, Porky Pig, Yosemite Sam, Tweety Bird, Sylvester the Cat, Speedy Gonzales, Foghorn Leghorn, Wile E. Coyote and Road Runner and Merlin the Magic Mouse. Guests could have their photographs taken with the characters. The shows occurred three times a day on weekdays, and four on weekends. The park did not have amusement-style rides, although there were plans (which never materialized) to add them in the spring of 1977.

=== Plans ===
The park was initially profitable. However, business declined gradually as it failed to attract repeat business without changing its attractions or adding new ones. In 1975, Warner Bros. proposed a $20 million expansion project to the site. The project would include a large wooden roller coaster, a steel junior coaster, a carousel, log flume, plus adult spinning rides, and a few "kiddie" rides. The township's residents were divided on whether or not to approve such a project. The potential for further traffic congestion was a major issue.

=== Closure and afterlife ===
The park opened as usual during the summer of 1976, with rumors of a big expansion planned for the following summer. The park's last weekend in operation was Halloween weekend. On November 2, township residents narrowly voted against the expansion. Following the vote, Warner Bros. decided to shut the park down and sell the land. After the park closed, newspapers reported that several animal carcasses, including an elephant, had been left there to decay. Competition from Great Adventure, combined with poor management and the park's inability to easily expand, may have contributed to the demise of Jungle Habitat.

For years after it closed, the site's deteriorated buildings remained, and rumors of animals still roaming the property attracted curiosity seekers. Accounts of such explorations were published in Weird NJ magazine, and on its website. None of the animal-based rumors are true; the animals were sold to buyers across the country.

The 800-acre (3.2 km^{2}) Jungle Habitat property, containing 26 miles (42 km) of paved roads, was purchased by the state in 1988 for $1.45 million. The property, adjacent to Norvin Green State Forest and Greenwood Lake Airport, is part of Long Pond Ironworks State Park and is administered by Ringwood State Park. In 2007, under the direction of Ringwood State Park, the Ramapo Valley Cycling Club (a chapter of the Jersey Off Road Bicycle Association JORBA) performed a cleanup of the park, with 70 volunteers contributing. Brush was cleared and trash was removed. More recently, under the management of Ringwood State Park, JORBA built single-track trails designed for bicycle, equestrian, and foot traffic. There were 11 to 12 miles of single-track trails by 2008.

There was negotiation between West Milford and New Jersey to lease the 10-acre (40,000 m^{2}) macadam parking lot for recreational use. In later years, the property was used to host West Milford's Fourth of July celebrations (known as "Thunder in the Highlands") under a special-use permit. A local bicycle shop sponsors "Rumble in the Jungle", an annual mountain bike race. The area has become popular with dog walkers, mountain bikers, trail runners, equestrians, and American black bears.

== Incidents ==
- On October 9, 1972, an Israeli tourist, Abraham Levy, driving through the safari in a taxi, was attacked by a lion.
- In November 1972, two wolves escaped their enclosure and were caught before leaving the property.
- In December 1972, television show host Jack Paar was cut while "roughhousing" with a 6-month-old tiger cub while filming a TV special.
- On July 8, 1974, a woman was bitten by a baby African elephant who had reached out of its enclosure with its trunk and grabbed the woman; she ultimately was awarded $200,000 for her injuries.
- In 1977, several of the park's animals had contracted tuberculosis and were euthanized.

== Former attractions ==
- Safari Car Ride – The main attraction of Warner Bros. Jungle Habitat was a drive through safari.
- Zebra-Go-Round – A carousel featuring zebras instead of horses.

== See also ==
- List of incidents at Warner Bros. Jungle Habitat
- African Lion Safari
- Warner Bros. Movie World
- Parque Warner Madrid
- Warner Bros. World Abu Dhabi
