= Red Wanting Blue =

American band

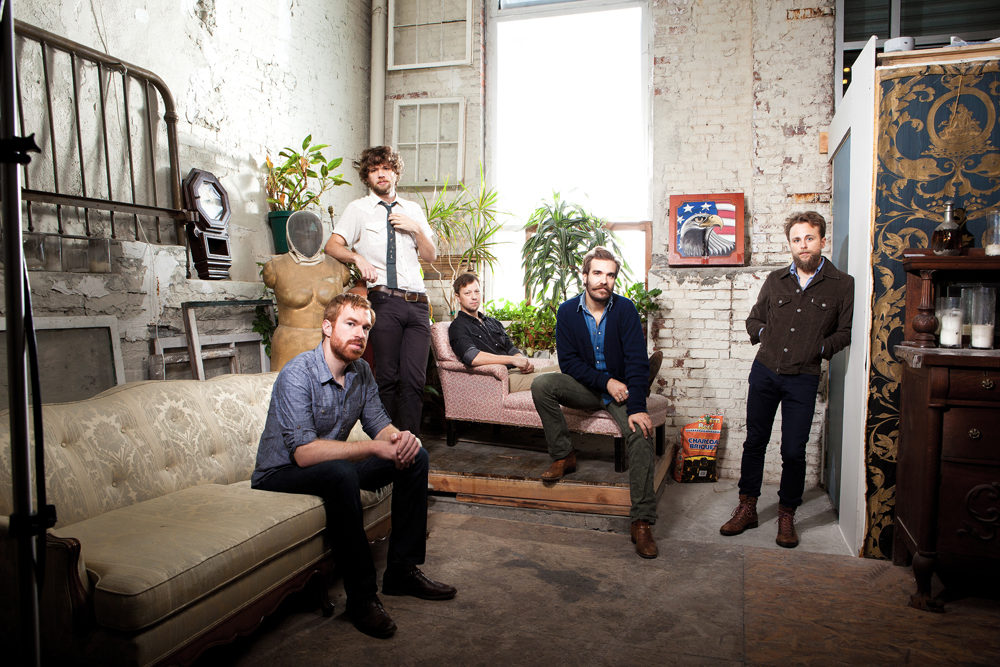
- Red Wanting Blue: Greg Rahm, Dean Anshutz, Mark McCullough, Scott Terry, and Eric Hall. Photo by Jason Tanaka Blaney

Background information
- Origin: Columbus, Ohio
- Genres: Rock and roll, Americana, heartland rock
- Years active: 1996–present
- Labels: Fanatic Records (Caroline/Capitol Music Group/Universal); Blue Élan Records
- Members: Scott Terry: vocals, ukulele, tenor guitar; Mark McCullough: bass, Chapman Stick, vocals; Greg Rahm: guitar, keyboard, vocals; Dean Anshutz: drums, percussion; Eric Hall: guitar, lap steel guitar, mandolin, vocals
- Website: Official website

Red Wanting Blue (also known as RWB) is a rock and roll band led by Scott Terry that formed in Athens, Ohio in 1996. In 1999, the band relocated its headquarters to Columbus, Ohio. RWB has been touring for nearly two decades playing around 200 live shows a year. Red Wanting Blue is known as an explosive live act to follow, with Terry being compared to some of the most entertaining frontmen in the industry.

On April 20, 2010, RWB announced that after fourteen years of operating as an independent band, they would be signing a three-album contract with Fanatic Records (Caroline/Capitol Music Group/Universal Music Group) out of New York City. The band stated that they had never considered signing a record contract before, but embraced Fanatic Records' "mom and pop" mentality.

The band has released twelve full-length albums to date: Velveteen (1996), Image Trigger (1998), Model Citizen (2000), Sirens (2001), Souvenirs of City Life (2002), Pride: The Cold Lover (2004), The Warehouse Sessions (2006), These Magnificent Miles (2008 & re-release, 2010), From The Vanishing Point (2011), Little America (2014), RWB20 Live at Lincoln Theater (2016), and The Wanting (2018).

From the Vanishing Point debuted at No. 10 on the Billboard Heatseekers Chart. This album cycle led to national appearances on Late Show with David Letterman, CBS, VH1's Big Morning Buzz Live and Mountain Stage, NPR where host Larry Groce said in his introduction, "Red Wanting Blue is America's local band. They earned their fans the right way — bar by bar and concert by concert."

Little America, RWB's 10th album was released on July 1, 2014, and debuted at No. 3 on the Billboard Heatseekers Chart and No. 31 on the Billboard Mainstream Rock Chart.

== The college years & independent recordings ==
=== Velveteen (1996 - 1998), Image Trigger (1998 - 2000) ===
Scott Terry (5/15/76 – present) formed the band while in school at Ohio University. Originally from New Jersey, he formed Red Wanting Blue in the fall of 1995. In 1996 Red Wanting Blue released their first full-length album titled Velveteen. While still in college in 1998, the band went on to release their second full-length album The Image Trigger.

=== Model Citizen (2000–2001) ===
Model Citizen was RWB's third studio release and arguably their breakthrough album. It was the first album with current bassist, Mark McCullough. After the release of Model Citizen, Red Wanting Blue started gaining media attention for their rapidly growing grassroots following. The original version of the song Audition was recorded for this album. The song was picked up nationally by Abercrombie and Fitch and placed on rotation at their stores throughout the US. Audition was later re-vamped and re-recorded for the 2011 album From the Vanishing Point and found success on the radio and television in 2012 and 2013.

=== Sirens (2001–2002) ===
Sirens is Red Wanting Blue's fourth studio release. The band would eventually dedicate Sirens to those lives lost during the September 11 attacks. Red Wanting Blue toured to support Sirens by headlining small rock clubs across the US.

=== Souvenirs of City Life (2002–2003) ===
Souvenirs of City Life is the band's fifth studio release. Souvenirs of City Life debuted at No. 1 on Aware Records online store – awarestore.com. Red Wanting Blue toured extensively during this time period headlining rock clubs and also touring alongside longtime friends O.A.R. as well as The Roots, Robert Randolph and N.E.R.D. RWB also played with popular band 311 during this time period.

== Modern Red Wanting Blue recordings ==
=== Pride: The Cold Lover (2004–2006) ===
The release of Pride: The Cold Lover is Red Wanting Blue's sixth studio effort. Ted Comerford produced the album in Raleigh, North Carolina. Pride: The Cold Lover again debuted at No. 1 on Awarestore (Aware Records online store) and several songs were placed on the CBS/VH1 program, Love Monkey as well as the CW hit show Life is Wild. Around this time period it was brought to the band's attention that hundreds of fans across the US tattooed Red Wanting Blue's symbol (an angel/devil sign – penned by Scott Terry in 1995) on their bodies. Honored, the band thanked those fans in the liner notes of this album. RWB picked up an additional member, guitarist, keyboardist and back-up vocalist Greg Rahm. RWB independently set out on a large tour (headlining venues from mid-level clubs to small theaters) stretching from New York to California. Songs from this album found themselves on XM Satellite Radio. During this time RWB was featured as an unsigned band to watch on Demodiaries.com, Kings of A&R and Hits Magazine.

=== The Warehouse Sessions (2006–2008) ===
The Warehouse Sessions is a live album/DVD recorded in the band's warehouse and studio space in front of 100 of RWB biggest fans from across the country. Tickets to this intimate event sold out in under two minutes. The Warehouse Sessions debuted at No. 1 on Awarestore.com (Aware Records online store) in its first week of pre-sale. It was made to bridge the gap between Pride: The Cold Lover and 2008's These Magnificent Miles. This album/DVD featured early acoustic versions of fan favorites "You Are My Las Vegas" and "Finger in the Air" from These Magnificent Miles.

=== These Magnificent Miles (2008–2010) ===
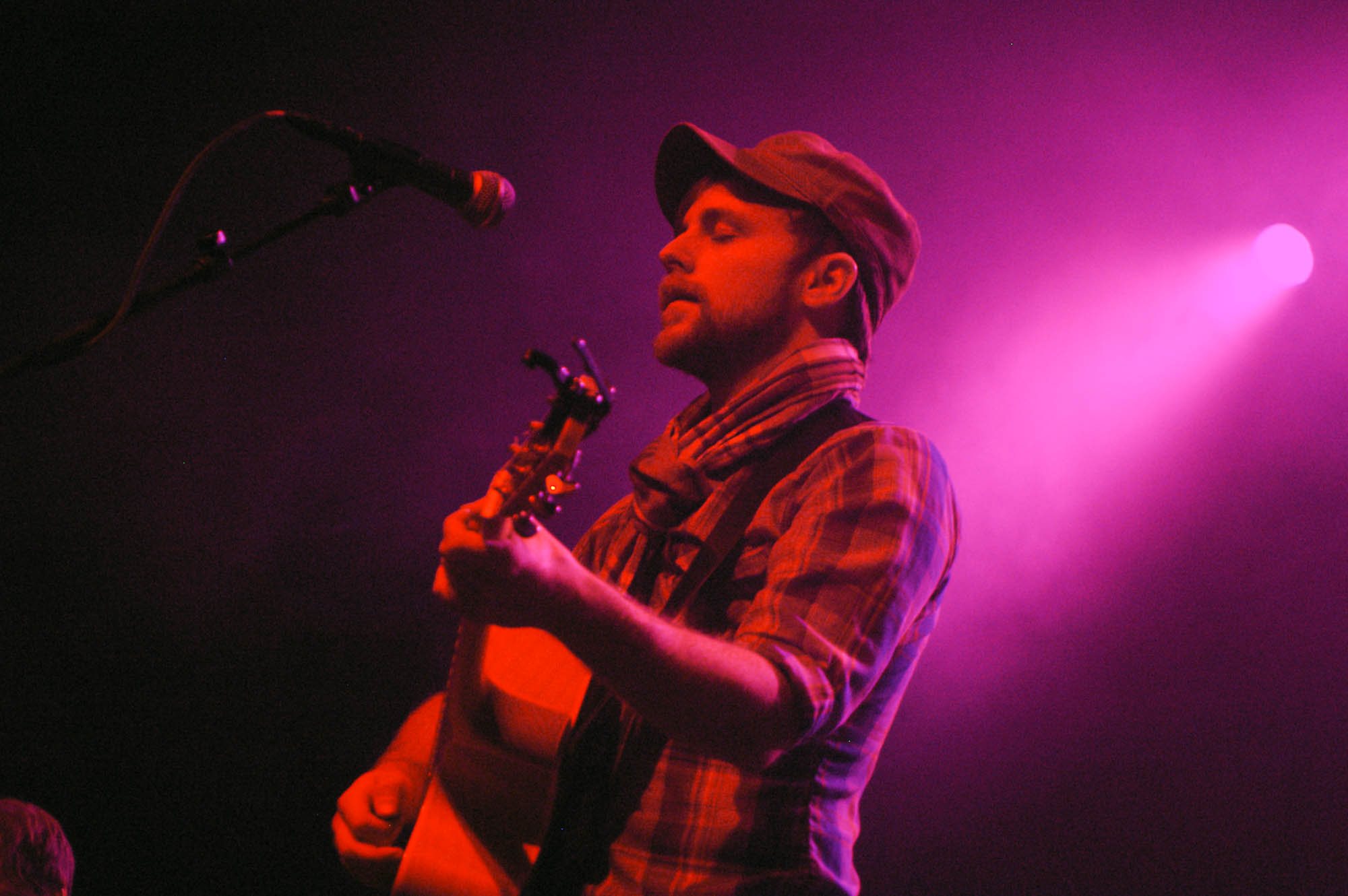
Performing at Anderson Arena in 2010.

The band enlisted Grammy nominated producer Jamie Candiloro (Ryan Adams, R.E.M., Willie Nelson) for These Magnificent Miles. Scott Terry is quoted as saying that this album was inspired by "the circus life of a band on the road." Current guitarist Eric Hall began his career with Red Wanting Blue during this time period. The band settled into an Americana rock ‘n’ roll vibe utilizing more melodic sounds than that of their prior work. Drummer Dean Anshutz joined the band toward the end of this album cycle.

After signing with Fanatic Records in April 2010, These Magnificent Miles was re-released nationally on July 27, 2010, for a wider audience. Fanatic also issued a deluxe double-LP edition of These Magnificent Miles with full-color LP sleeves featuring the art of John Terry (Scott Terry's brother). In September 2010, the single "Where You Wanna Go" was heard on radio stations across the country. An eccentric music video was released for "Where You Wanna Go" featuring the band finding themselves trapped in an Alice in Wonderland type setting. Red Wanting Blue settled into a rhythm on tour of nearly selling out venues in advance (large rock clubs and mid-sized theaters), most shows during this time period selling out by day of show. The band's following in major cities like NYC started doubling in size with each live concert.

Red Wanting Blue was commissioned to write a song for the film "Unraveled". The song called "Magic Man" was released as a single and is played in its entirety during the film. The documentary "These Magnificent Miles – On the Long Road with Red Wanting Blue" was released in April 2011. The band does not sell or support the documentary. On April 13, 2011, lead singer Scott Terry was the guest star on NPR Radio's Snap Judgement and told a story about the band traveling through Yellowstone National Park and running into "trouble". In June 2011 Red Wanting Blue was presented with the Key to the City from the mayor of Kearney, Nebraska.

=== From The Vanishing Point (2011–2014) ===
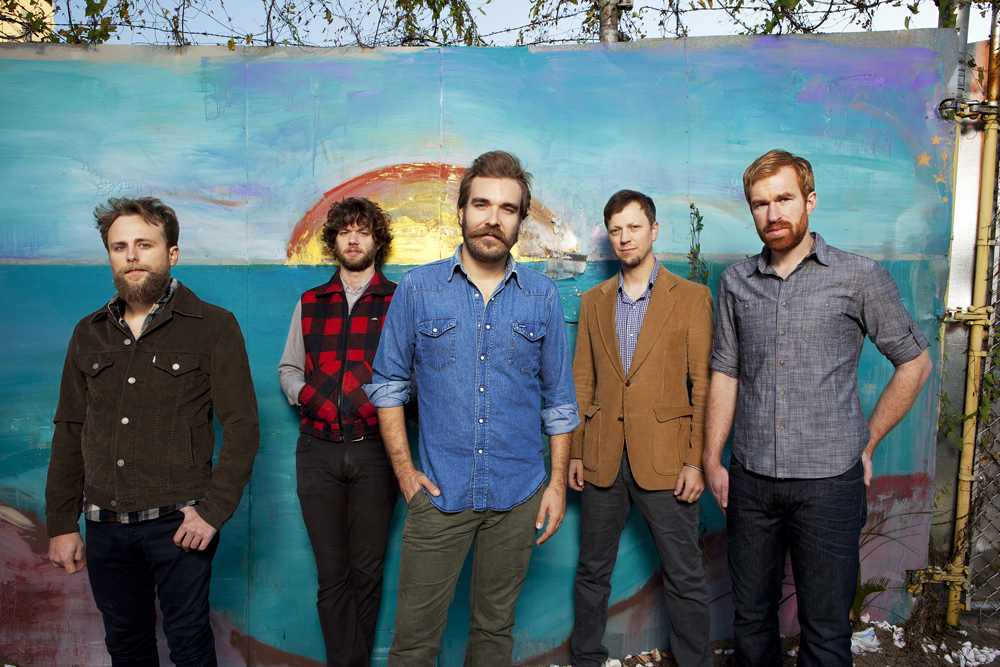
Red Wanting Blue, 2012. Photo by Jason Tanaka Blaney

In early 2011, the band headed into the studio to begin recording their second official label release (RWB's 9th album). Once again, the band enlisted the talents of Jamie Candiloro to produce the album. The title of the album was released on August 5, 2011, through social media outlets. From the Vanishing Point was originally slated for release in the fall of 2011, but the album release was pushed back to January 2012. In the weeks before its release From the Vanishing Point was streamed over 80,000 times in the month of October alone. Over 150,000 streams of the album were recorded by the turn of 2012. "From the Vanishing Point" landed at #10 on The Billboard Heatseekers Chart in its first official week of release. The singles "Audition," "Stay on the Bright Side" and "White Snow" were released on Adult Album Alternative radio also known as AAAradio or Triple-A. The music video for "Audition" was shot live, in one-take on October 13 at the Newport Music Hall in Columbus, OH. The intention was to introduce the authentic live energy of the band without including the "Hollywood magic" that is involved in most "live-style" music videos. In November 2011, Red Wanting Blue along with producer Jamie Candiloro headed back into the studio to record "You're a Mean One, Mr. Grinch" as a holiday treat for their fans. The song found its way to the radio and was picked up as a holiday single. Music Choice Television also picked up the song as a holiday single.

RWB's album release tour kicked off in January 2012 and consisted of several months of sold-out shows from Chicago to New York City and more. This time proved to be the band's most successful period of touring to date with concerts selling out weeks in advance. In the morning, before most tour stops, the band could be heard making special appearances on the local radio stations (most included an interview and two to three songs). Red Wanting Blue also performed on The Rock Boat in March as well as several shows with friends and fellow musicians Carbon Leaf. On June 29, 2012 RWB's live concert attendance record was broken in Cuyahoga Falls, Ohio. Over 9,000 people attended the outdoor concert dubbed "Red Wanting Blue - Rocking on the River" in support of the band. On April 13, "Unraveled", the film that features RWB's "Magic Man", was released theatrically (later debuting on Showtime on August 8.) On July 10, the band made available a free download of their concert from NYC venue City Winery.

On July 18, Red Wanting Blue made their network television debut on the Late Show with David Letterman performing the song "Audition" to an audience that roared and cheered along. On Sept 17th RWB performed their debut session on Daytrotter.com. On October 1, 2012, the band announced they would be performing and appearing live on VH1's morning show "Big Morning Buzz Live" on October 16 at 10am alongside Bruno Mars and Jason Aldean. On November 5 Red Wanting Blue performed live on the NPR radio program Mountain Stage alongside Dr. Dog and The Mountain Goats at the Keith Albee Theater in West Virginia.

In early 2013, RWB headlined a tour of the west coast and continued to sell out shows throughout the Midwest and east coast. They also toured eastern Canada with The Trews and hit a major milestone by selling out The Bowery Ballroom in New York City. At The Bowery Ballroom on March 9, Red Wanting Blue announced that they would be heading back into the studio with producer/friend Jamie Candiloro throughout March and April 2013 to record their 10th album.

Throughout March, April and May 2013, Red Wanting Blue returned to their recording studio ("El Rancho Relaxo" in Columbus, Ohio) with Jamie Candiloro to produce their tenth album. This had been the longest amount of time ever scheduled off the road (for the purpose of recording) in the band's career. In September, RWB announced their fall tour dates with longtime friend Will Hoge. Red Wanting Blue chose Swear and Shake to open several dates on this fall tour entitled "The Dime Store Circus Tour".

In February 2014 Red Wanting Blue officially sold out their first two-night stint at the House of Blues In Cleveland, Ohio. They performed their "love songs" on the February 14 concert in honor of Valentine's Day and performed their full rock and roll show on February 15. The band played several rare songs from their early albums during these concerts.

On February 22 the band set sail for their 3rd appearance on The Rock Boat. Red Wanting Blue played on the theatre and pool deck stages. Scott Terry was invited to perform at the "Campfire Story Sessions" where he performed solo with his ukulele and told the true stories behind the songs "Probably Nothing", "Jennifear" and a never before performed song called "Little America." Ken Block and Drew Copland (of Sister Hazel), Emerson Hart (of Tonic) and Edwin McCain sang harmony on "Jennifear" as Scott Terry expressed several times how honored he was to be in their company.

=== Little America (2014 – 2016) ===
On July 1, 2014, Red Wanting Blue released their tenth studio album titled Little America. The album debuted at No. 3 on the Billboard Heatseekers Chart and No. 31 on the Billboard Mainstream Rock Chart. The album was recorded in Columbus, Ohio and Los Angeles, California, produced by Jamie Candiloro and mastered by Greg Calbi at Sterling Sound in NYC. Guest appearances include Ed Kowalczyk (of Live (band)), Kerri Spieler (of Swear and Shake) and Tim Hanseroth (of Brandi Carlile). A music video was released for the single You Are My Las Vegas starring the band member's real-life mothers. In the video, the moms physically transform into their sons (beards and all) and perform the song in character.

To celebrate the release of Little America, RWB hit the road with longtime friends The Alternate Routes. The Sounds Like Summer U.S. Tour started in July 2014. In November, 2014 RWB hit the road with New Orleans band The Revivalists for a tour of the east coast and midwest. On Dec 4, 2014, Red Wanting Blue performed a special concert at Trinity Cathedral in Cleveland, Ohio. The performance consisted of both acoustic and electric sets and was recorded for the Cathedral Concert Series for PBS (rumored to air in March 2015).

In January, 2015, the band set sail to perform on the floating music festival Cayamo that featured John Prine, Lyle Lovett, Lucinda Williams, Brandi Carlile, Kacey Musgraves, The Lone Bellow, and more. Directly after Cayamo, the band boarded The Rock Boat XV for their fourth consecutive year. The band performed alongside hosts Sister Hazel, Barenaked Ladies, longtime friends Alternate Routes, Will Hoge, and more. Scott Terry hosted the popular Rock Boat Songwriter Sessions and performed two brand new songs titled "Holy Rolling Thunder" and "No Place To Go But Down".

RWB hit the road in the spring/summer of 2015 on a tour called "Our Little America Tour". The tour began in Northwest Canada and ended in Boston. During this time they shared the stage with friends The Trews and The Alternate Routes. They debuted two new songs during this tour titled "High and Dry" and "Holy Rolling Thunder".

=== RWB20 Live at Lincoln Theater (since 2016) ===
This live concert film was recorded live at the Lincoln Theater in Columbus, Ohio on October 14, 2016. The double disc RWB20 film and album was released only two months later, on December 16, 2016. The film was directed by Jenna Pace and the album was produced by Greg Rahm. The film's purpose was to celebrate the first 20 years of Red Wanting Blue. The concert started with a brand new song and proceeded to go back in time, playing re-worked versions of songs dating back to 1996.

== Discography ==
Title	Released
Velveteen	September 6, 1996
The Image Trigger	April 4, 1998
Model Citizen	April 3, 2000
Sirens	November 16, 2001
Souvenirs of City Life	February 8, 2003
Pride: the Cold Lover	October 19, 2004
The Warehouse Sessions	December 12, 2006
These Magnificent Miles	August 21, 2008
These Magnificent Miles (re-release)	July 27, 2010
From the Vanishing Point	January 10, 2012
Little America	July 1, 2014
RWB20 Live at Lincoln Theater	December 16, 2016
The Wanting	April 27, 2018
Light It Up	June 7, 2024
