= Abram S. Hewitt State Forest =

State forest in New Jersey, United States

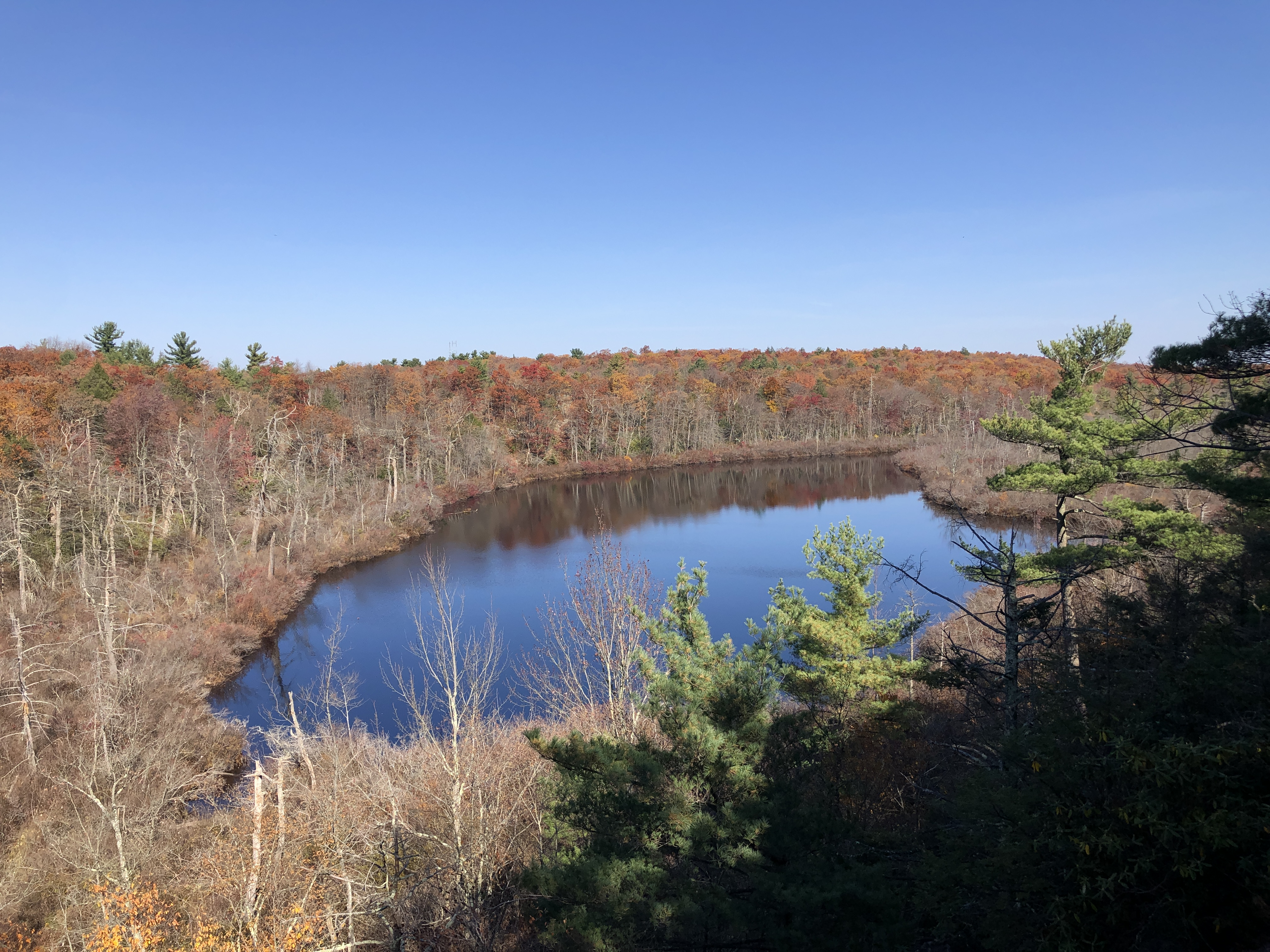
- West Pond in Abram S. Hewitt State Forest.

- Location within New Jersey Location within the United States
- Interactive map of Abram S. Hewitt State Forest
- Location: West Milford, Passaic County, New Jersey
- Coordinates: 41°11′09″N 74°19′53″W
- Area: 2,001-acre (8.10 km^{2})
- Opened: 1951
- Operator: New Jersey Division of Parks and Forestry
- Website: Official website

Abram S. Hewitt State Forest is a 2,001 acres (8.10 km^{2}) state forest in West Milford, Passaic County in northern New Jersey. The forest is centered on the northern portion of Bearfort Mountain between Greenwood Lake and Upper Greenwood Lake, which consists of an unusual conglomerate. Its forests are part of the Northeastern coastal forests ecoregion. It has a number of overlooks and colorful bedrock. It is accessible only on foot, with trails including the Bearfort Trail, 3.0 miles (4.8 km) and white-blazed. Another trail is the Quail trail, 2.4 miles (3.9 km) and orange-blazed. Another is the Ernest Walter trail, 1.9 miles (3.1 km) and yellow-blazed. Also, the 1.2 miles (1.9 km) State Line trail is blazed with blue on white. Lastly, the Appalachian Trail traverses the forest's northwest corner along its route. The Appalachian Trail is approximately 2,200 miles (3,500 km) long.

== See also ==
- List of New Jersey state parks
