= West Milford Township Public Schools =

School district in Passaic County, New Jersey, US

Address
- 46 Highlander Drive West Milford, Passaic County, New Jersey, 07480; United States
- Coordinates: 41.081327°N 74.386223°W

District information
- Grades: PreK-12
- Superintendent: Lydia Furnari
- Business administrator: William Scholts
- Schools: 8

Students and staff
- Enrollment: 3,028 (as of 2021–22)
- Faculty: 279.2 FTEs
- Student–teacher ratio: 10.8:1

Other information
- District Factor Group: FG
- Website: www.wmtps.org
Ind.	Per pupil	District spending	Rank (*)	K-12 average	%± vs. average
1A	Total Spending	$19,634	70	$18,891	3.9%
1	Budgetary Cost	16,076	80	14,783	8.7%
2	Classroom Instruction	9,642	84	8,763	10.0%
6	Support Services	2,439	63	2,392	2.0%
8	Administrative Cost	1,588	73	1,485	6.9%
10	Operations & Maintenance	1,893	75	1,783	6.2%
13	Extracurricular Activities	293	69	268	9.3%
16	Median Teacher Salary	63,820	46	64,043
Data from NJDoE 2014 Taxpayers' Guide to Education Spending. *Of K-12 districts with more than 3,500 students. Lowest spending=1; Highest=103

The West Milford Township Public Schools are a comprehensive community public school district that serves students in pre-kindergarten through twelfth grade from West Milford, in Passaic County, in the U.S. state of New Jersey.

As of the 2021–22 school year, the district, comprising eight schools, had an enrollment of 3,028 students and 279.2 classroom teachers (on an FTE basis), for a student–teacher ratio of 10.8:1.

The district is classified by the New Jersey Department of Education as being in District Factor Group "FG", the fourth-highest of eight groupings. District Factor Groups organize districts statewide to allow comparison by common socioeconomic characteristics of the local districts. From lowest socioeconomic status to highest, the categories are A, B, CD, DE, FG, GH, I and J.

The district has six elementary schools (grades K-5), one middle school (grade 6-8), and one high school (grades 9-12), and also supports a Center for Adult/Community Education. The school system has 361 certified staff members, over 50% of whom have a master's degree or higher.

== History ==
The old Newfoundland, two-room schoolhouse is now the Grasshopper Restaurant. The old Hillcrest School is now the township's community center. The few one-room schoolhouses are all gone; the last one was the Hewitt School, destroyed by fire set by vandals (it had been the former Methodist church before a new, larger church was built).

Students from West Milford had attended Butler High School for grades 9-12 as part of a longstanding sending/receiving relationship that existed until September 1962, when West Milford opened its own high school. The Butler Public Schools had served students from large parts of Morris and Passaic counties, until soaring local enrollment led the district to notify feeder communities in 1954 that they would have to find alternative education options for their high school students.

== Awards and recognition ==
The NAMM Foundation named the district in its 2009 survey of the "Best Communities for Music Education", which included 124 school districts nationwide.

The district was selected as one of the top "100 Best Communities for Music Education in America 2005" by the American Music Conference.

== Schools ==
Schools in the district (with 2021–22 enrollment data from the National Center for Education Statistics) are:

Elementary schools

- Apshawa Elementary School with 999 students in grades K-5
  - Dana Swarts, principal
- Maple Road Elementary School with 231 students in grades PreK-5
  - William Kane, principal
- Marshall Hill Elementary School with 251 students in grades K-5
  - Patrick O'Donnell, principal
- Paradise Knoll Elementary School with 192 students in grades K-5
  - Jennifer Miller, principal
- Upper Greenwood Lake Elementary School with 192 students in grades K-5
  - Jared Fowler, principal
- Westbrook Elementary School with 238 students in grades K-5 was closed for the start of the 2023-24 school year.

Middle school

- Macopin Middle School with 777 students in grades 6-8
  - Gregory Matlosz, principal

High school

- West Milford High School with 936 students in grades 9-12
  - Matthew Strianse, principal

== Administration ==
Core members of the district's administration are:

- Lydia Furnari, Interim superintendent of schools
- William Scholts, business administrator and board secretary

== Board of education ==
The district's board of education, comprised of nine members, sets policy and oversees the fiscal and educational operation of the district through its administration. As a Type II school district, the board's trustees are elected directly by voters to serve three-year terms of office on a staggered basis, with three seats up for election each year held (since 2013) as part of the November general election. The board appoints a superintendent to oversee the district's day-to-day operations and a business administrator to supervise the business functions of the district.
