= Scott Terry (musician) =

American songwriter and singer (born 1976)

- Born: Scott Andrew Terry; May 15, 1976 (age 50); West Milford, New Jersey, U.S.
- Occupations: Singer, songwriter, musician, voiceover artist
- Instruments: Vocals, tenor guitar, baritone ukulele
- Years active: 1996–present
- Member of: Red Wanting Blue
- Website: redwantingblue.com

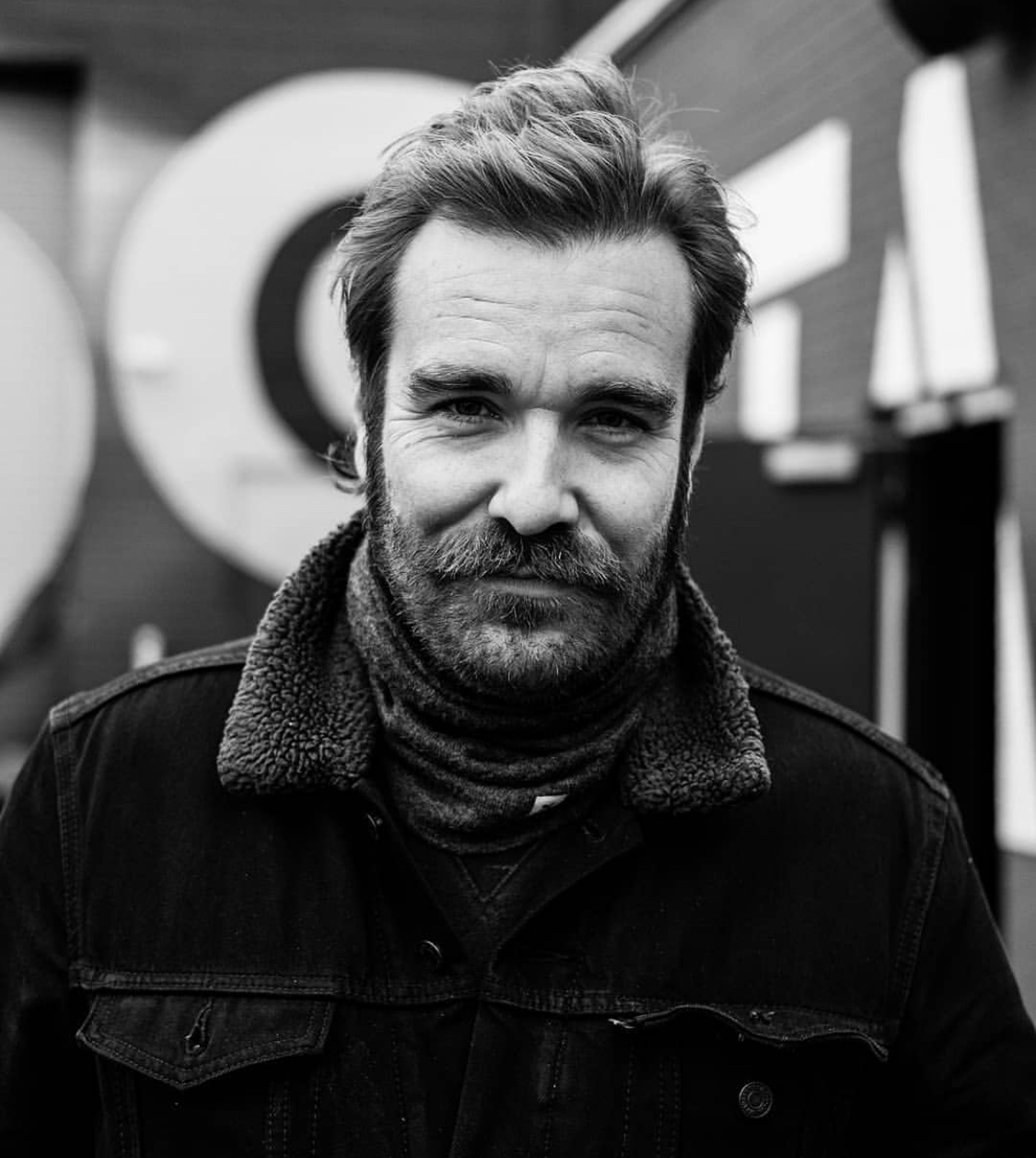
Terry by David Apuzzo

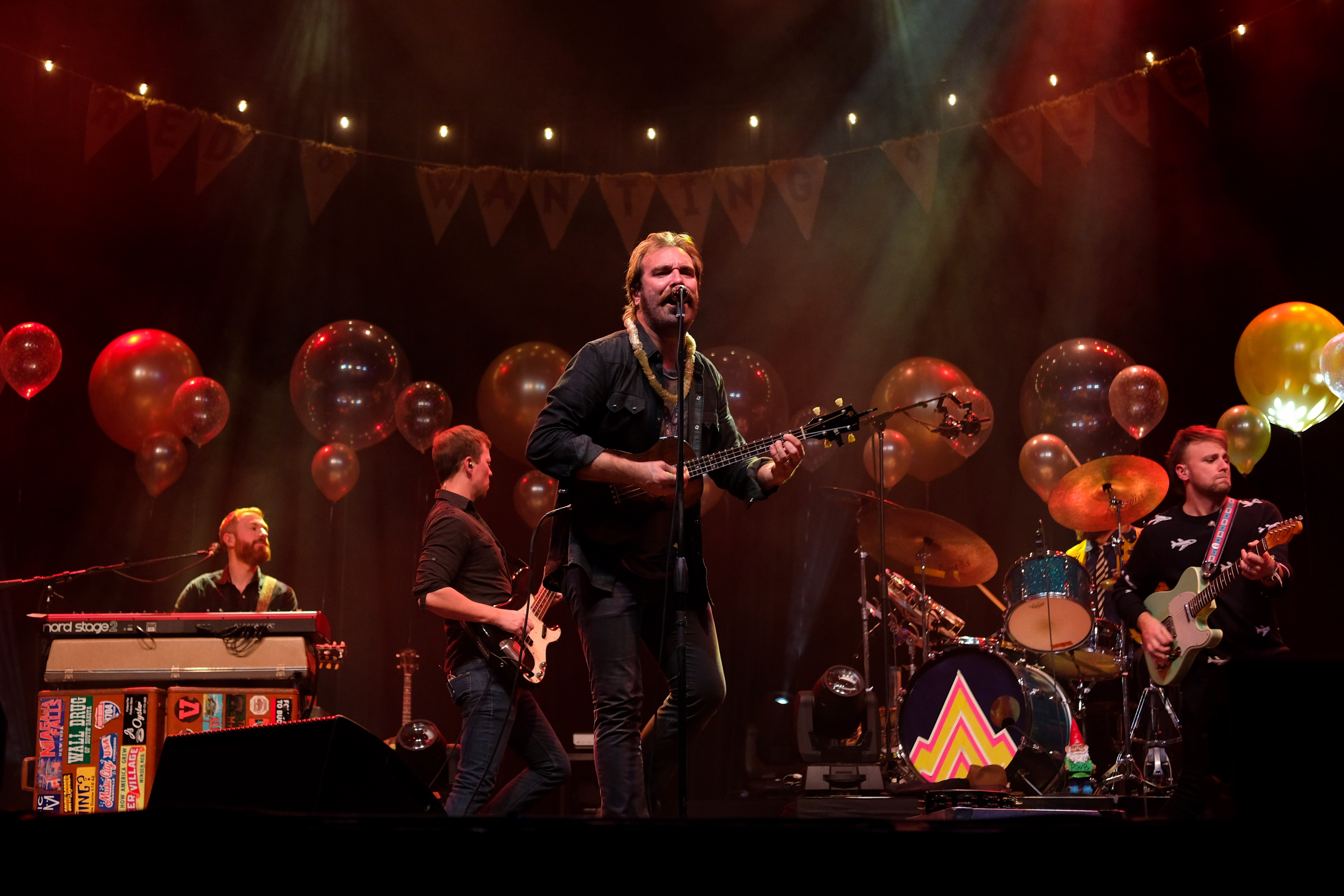
Terry performing with Red Wanting Blue

Scott Terry (born May 15, 1976) is an American songwriter and singer. Since 1996, he has fronted the Americana rock and roll band Red Wanting Blue. Terry is best known for passionate and often emotional live performances, autobiographical writing style and rugged baritone singing voice.

Terry has performed live nationally with his band on The Late Show, VH1, has written music used in television and film, and was the subject of “RWB20: Live at The Lincoln Theater” a concert film celebrating the first 20 years of Red Wanting Blue's career.

== Early life ==
Scott Terry was born in West Milford, New Jersey, and is the middle child of three sons born to a public school teacher and a local township government employee. In 1985, the Terry family moved to Moorestown, New Jersey. He started singing in choirs and a cappella groups throughout middle school and high school. Terry attended college at Ohio University and graduated, with honors, with a degree in Performance.

== Musical career ==
In 1996, while in college, Terry founded and formed the band Red Wanting Blue. He went on to travel and record with the band, performing nearly 200 shows a year.

Terry has written for and recorded 13 albums with Red Wanting Blue: Velveteen (1996), Image Trigger (1998), Model Citizen (2000), Sirens (2001), Souvenirs of City Life (2002), Pride: The Cold Lover (2004), The Warehouse Sessions (2006), These Magnificent Miles (2008 & re-release, 2010), From The Vanishing Point (2011), Little America (2014), RWB20 Live at Lincoln Theater (2016), The Wanting (2018) and The Peppermint Sessions (2020).

From the Vanishing Point debuted at No. 10 on the Billboard Heatseekers Chart. Little America debuted at No. 3 on the Billboard Heatseekers Chart and No. 31 on the Billboard Mainstream Rock Chart. The Wanting debuted at No. 3 on the Billboard Heatseekers Chart.

In 2017, Scott Terry embarked in a side project in collaboration with friends Eric Hall of Red Wanting Blue, Tim Warren and Eric Donnelly of The Alternate Routes to form the quartet ARWBx4. The quartet set out on a short tour playing re-worked versions each other's songs. A live album was recorded at the Fairfield Theater Company in Connecticut and a concert film was recorded live at Rockwood Music Hall, NYC.
