= List of parishes in Diocese of Paterson =

This is a list of parishes in the Roman Catholic Diocese of Paterson in the state of New Jersey in the United States. The parishes are divided into 13 deaneries. The Cathedral of Saint John the Baptist is located in Paterson.

== Paterson Deanery ==
All of the parishes in this deanery are located in the City of Paterson.

Name	Image	Location	Description/Notes
Blessed Sacrament		308 6th Ave	Founded in 1911
Cathedral of Saint John the Baptist		381 Grand St, Paterson	Founded in 1820, Saint John's Church was dedicated in 1870. It was re-dedicated as the Cathedral of Saint John the Baptist in 1937 It is the oldest parish in Paterson.
Our Lady of Lourdes		440 River St	Founded in 1882
Our Lady of Pompeii		Caldwell Ave & Dayton St	Founded as a mission in 1916 for Italian immigrants. Became a parish in 1930, current church dedicated in 1963
Our Lady of Victories		100 Fair St	Founded in 1883
Saint Agnes		681 Main St	Founded in 1883
Saint Anthony of Padua		138 Beech St	Founded as a mission in 1909, became a parish in 1911
Saint Bonaventure		174 Ramsey St	Founded as a mission in 1876, became a parish in 1877
Saint Gerard Majella		501 W Broadway	Founded as a mission in 1961, church dedicated in 1962, became a parish in 1965
Saint Joseph		399 Market St	Founded as a mission in 1867, became a parish in 1875
Saint Mary Help of Christians		410 Union Ave #420	Founded as a mission in 1873, became a parish in 1880
Saint Stephen		86 Martin St	Founded in 1903
Saint Therese		80 13th Ave	Founded in 1926

== Passaic Deanery ==
All of the parishes in this deanery are located in the City of Passaic.

Name	Image	Location	Description/Notes
Holy Rosary		6 Wall St	Founded in 1918 for Polish immigrants, church dedicated in 1921
Holy Trinity		226 Harrison St	Founded in 1900
Our Lady of Fatima & Saint Nicholas		153 Washington Pl	Saint Nicholas was founded in 1868, merged with Our Lady in 2022. Our Lady was founded as a mission in 1954, became a parish in 1972.
Our Lady of Carmel		10 St Francis Way	Founded as a mission in 1905, became a parish in 1922
Saint Anthony of Padua		101-103 Myrtle Ave	Founded as a mission in 1917, became a parish in 1948
Saint Joseph		7 Parker Ave	Founded in 1892 for Polish immigrants
Saint Mary's Assumption		63 Monroe St	Founded in 1891 for Slovak immigrants, church dedicated in 1902
Saint Stephen		86 Martin St	Founded in 1902

== Clifton Deanery ==
Name	Image	Location	Description/Notes
Sacred Heart		145 Randolph Ave	Founded in 1897
Saint Andrew the Apostle		6720 Union Mill Rd	Founded in 1938
Saint Brendan-Saint George		154 E 1st St	Saint George was founded in 1897, merged with Saint Brendan in 2011. Saint Brendan was founded in 1945.
Saint Clare		69 Allwood Rd	Founded in 1912, became a parish in 1941
Saints Cyril and Methodius		225 Ackerman Ave	Founded in 1913
Saint John Kanty		49 Speer Ave	Founded in 1933 for Polish immigrants, church dedicated in 1936
Saint Paul		124 Union Ave	Founded in 1911
Saint Philip the Apostle		797 Valley Rd	Founded as a mission in the early 1940s, became a parish in 1949, current church dedicated in 1954

== Mid-Passaic County Deanery ==
The following parishes are in Wayne and other communities in Passaic County.

Name	Image	Location	Description/Notes
Annunciation of the Blessed Virgin		45 Urban Club Rd, Wayne	Founded in 1963
Immaculate Heart of Mary		580 Ratzer Rd, Wayne	Founded as a mission in 1956, church dedicated in 1959, became a parish in 1960
Our Lady of Consolation		1799 Hamburg Tpke, Wayne	Founded in 1963, church dedicated in 1967
Our Lady of the Holy Angels		473 Main St, Little Falls Township	Founded in 1883, home of the National Shrine of Our Lady of the Highway
Our Lady of the Valley and Holy Cross		630 Valley Rd, Wayne	Our Lady of the Valley was founded as a mission in 1960 and became a parish in 1961, The church dedicated in 1962. Merged with Holy Cross in the 2010s.
Saint Anthony		276 Diamond Bridge Ave, Hawthorne	Founded as a mission in 1908, current church dedicated in 1932
Saint James of the Marches		410 Totowa Rd, Totowa	Founded in 1926
Saint Paul		286 Haledon Ave, Prospect Park	Founded in 1924, became a parish in 1925

== Northern Passaic County Deanery ==
The following parishes are in Passaic County.

Name	Image	Location	Description/Notes
Our Lady Queen of Peace		1911 Union Valley Rd, Hewitt	
Saint Anthony of Padua		65 Bartholdi Ave, Butler	Founded as mission in 1909, became a parish in 1911
Saint Catherine of Bologna		112 Erskine Rd, Ringwood	Founded as a mission in 1917, became a parish in 1945
Saint Francis of Assisi		868 Ringwood Ave, Haskell	Founded as mission in 1905, became a parish in 1945
Saint Joseph		454 Germantown Rd, West Milford	Founded in 1765, it was one of the first mission churches in New Jersey
Saint Mary		17 Pompton Ave, Pompton Lakes	Founded as mission in 1906, became a parish in 1945

== Eastern Morris County Deanery ==
The following deanery contains parishes in Parsippany and other communities in Morris County.

Name	Image	Location	Description/Notes	
Notre Dame of Mt. Carmel		75 Ridgedale Ave, Cedar Knolls	Founded as a mission in 1925, current church dedicated in 1985	
Our Lady of Mercy		63 E Main St, Rockaway	85 Whippany Rd, Whippany	Founded in 1882, church dedicated in 1954
Saint Ann		781 Smith Rd, Parsippany	Founded as a mission in 1981, became a parish in 1983, church consecrated in 1986	
Saint Catherine of Siena		10 N Pocono Rd, Mountain Lakes	Founded as a mission in 1956, became a parish in 1967	
Saint Christopher		1050 Littleton Rd, Parsippany	Founded in 1960	
Saint Peter the Apostle		179 Baldwin Rd, Parsippany	Founded in 1938	
Saint Rose of Lima		312 Ridgedale Ave, East Hanover	Founded in 1957, became a parish in 1959	
Saint Virgil		250 Speedwell Ave, Morris Plains	Founded in 1881, current church started in 1955	

== Northeastern Morris County Deanery ==
The following deanery contains parishes in Boonton and other communities in Morris County.

Name	Image	Location	Description/Notes
Holy Spirit		318 Newark Pompton Tpke, Peguannock	Founded in 1949, church dedicated in 1950
Our Lady of Good Counsel		155 West Pkwy, Pompton Plains	Founded as a mission in 1962, became a parish in 1963
Our Lady of the Magnificat		2 Miller Rd, Kinnelon	Founded as a mission in 1961
Our Lady of Mt. Carmel		910 Birch St, Boonton	Founded as a mission in 1847, became a parish in 1860
Saints Cyril and Methodius		215 Hill St, Boonton	Founded in 1906 for Slovak immigrants, church dedicated that same year
Saint Joseph		216 Comly Rd, Lincoln Park	Founded as a mission in 1922, became a parish in 1937
Saint Pius		24 Changebridge Rd, Montville	Founded in 1960, church dedicated in 1963

== Northern Morris County Deanery ==
The following parishes are located in Dover, Rockaway and other communities in Morris County.

Name	Image	Location	Description/Notes
Sacred Heart and Our Lady of the Holy Rosary		4 Richards Ave, Dover	Sacred Heart founded in 1904. Our Lady founded as a mission in 1959, became a parish in 1984. Parishes merged in 2018.
Sacred Heart of Jesus		63 E Main St, Rockaway	Founded in 1923 for Slovak immigrants, church dedicated that same year
Saint Bernard		22 St Bernards Rd, Wharton	Founded as a mission in 1861, became a parish in 1875
Saint Cecelia		90 Church St, Rockaway	Founded as a mission in 1869, became a parish in 1881
Saint Clement Pope and Martyr		154 Mt Pleasant Ave, Dover	Founded in 1964
Saint Mary		15 Myers Ave, Denville	Founded as a mission in 1925, became a parish in 1941
Saint Mary		425 W Blackwell St, Dover	Founded in 1872, current church dedicated that same year
Saint Simon the Apostle		1010 Green Pond Rd, Newfoundland	Founded as a mission in 1942, became a parish in 1946. Reverted to a mission in 1966, became a parish again in 1981

== Southeastern Morris County Deanery ==
The following parishes are located in Chatham Township and other communities in Morris County.

Name	Image	Location	Description/Notes
Christ the King		16 Blue Mill Rd, New Vernon	Founded as a mission in 1956, became a parish in 1967
Corpus Christi		234 Southern Blvd, Chatham Township	Founded in 1966
Holy Family		35 Orchard Rd, Florham Park	Founded as a mission in 1951 and church dedicated that same year. Became a parish in 1954
Saint Patrick		85 Washington Ave, Chatham Township	Founded as a parish in 1874, became a parish in 1887
Saint Thomas More		4 Convent Rd, Morristown	Founded in 1966
Saint Vincent Martyr		26 Green Village Rd, Madison	Founded as a mission in 1805, became a parish in 1825. It is the oldest Catholic parish in Morris County.
Saint Vincent de Paul		250 Bebout Ave, Stirling	Founded as a mission in 1886, became a parish in 1920

== Southwestern Morris County Deanery ==
The following parishes are located in Morristown, Long Valley and other communities in Morris County.

Name	Image	Location	Description/Notes
Assumption of the Blessed Virgin Mary		91 Maple Ave, Morristown	Founded in 1848, Assumption is the oldest parish in Morristown. Church dedicated in 1873
Our Lady of the Mountain		2 E Springtown Rd, Long Valley	Founded as a mission in 1954, became a parish in 1989.
Resurrection		651 Millbrook Ave, Randolph	
Saint Elizabeth Ann Seton		61 Main St, Flanders	Founded in 1985, church dedicated in 1991
Saint Joseph		6 New St, Mendham	Founded as a mission in 1853, its chapel is the oldest church property in the diocese. Became a parish in 1874, current church dedicated in 1989
Saint Lawrence the Martyr		375 Main St, Chester	Founded as a mission in 1950, became a parish in 1957
Saint Luke		265 W Mill Rd, Long Valley	Founded in 1982, church dedicated in 1989
Saint Margaret of Scotland		6 Sussex Ave, Morristown	Founded as a mission in 1885, became a parish in 1930
Saint Mark the Evangelist		59 Spring Ln, Long Valley	Founded as a mission in 1986, became a parish in 1988, church dedicated in 2002
Saint Matthew the Apostle		335 Dover Chester Rd, Randolph	Founded in 1996

== Western Morris County Deanery ==
This deanery includes parishes from Hopatcong and other communities in Morris County.

Name	Image	Location	Description/Notes
Our Lady of the Lake		8 Windemere Ave, Mount Arlington	Founded as a mission in 1888, became a parish in 1938.
Our Lady Star of the Sea		204 Espanong Rd, Lake Hopatcong	Founded as a mission in 1891, became a parish in 1938, church dedicated in 1959
Saint Jude		17 Mount Olive Rd, Budd Lake	Founded as a mission in the 1930s, became a parish in 1967, church dedicated in 1990
Saint Jude		40 Maxim Dr, Hopatcong	Founded as a mission in 1959, church dedicated that same year. Became a parish in 1966.
Saint Michael		4 Church St, Netcong	Founded in 1873, became a parish in 1880
Saint Therese		151 Main Street, Succasunna	Founded in 1959
Saint Thomas the Apostle		5635 Berkshire Valley Rd, Oak Ridge	Paired with Saint John Vianney in Stockhold

== Sussex County Deanery ==
All of the parishes in this deanery are in Sussex County.

Name	Image	Location	Description/Notes
Good Shepherd		48 Tranquility Rd, Andover	Founded as a mission in 1975, became a parish in 1979, church dedicated in 1985
Immaculate Conception		75 Church St, Franklin	Founded as a mission in 1867, became a parish in 1881
Our Lady of Fatima		184 Breakneck Rd, Highland Lakes	Founded in the 1940s for vacationers, church dedicated in 1955, became a parish in 1965
Our Lady of the Lake		294 S Sparta Ave, Sparta	Founded as a mission in 1929, church dedicated in 1935, became a parish in 1949
Our Lady of Mount Carmel		203 Swartswood Rd, Newton	Founded as a mission in 1951, church dedicated in 1967, became a parish in 1970
Our Lady Queen of Peace		209 US-206, Branchville	Founded in 1950
Saint Francis de Sales		614 County Rd 517, Vernon Township	Founded as a mission in 1963, became a parish in 1979, church dedicated in 1986
Saint James the Greater		75 River Rd, Montague	Founded as a mission in 1943, church dedicated in 1945.
Saint John Vianney		2823 NJ-23, Stockholm	Founded as a mission in 1957, church dedicated in 1958. Paired with Saint Thomas the Apostle in Oak Ridge.
Saint Joseph		24 Halsted St, Newton	Founded in 1854
Saint Jude the Apostle		4 Beaver Run Rd, Hamburg	Founded as a mission in 1965, church dedicated in 1968, became a parish in 1979
Saint Kateri Tekakwitha		427 Stanhope Sparta Rd. Sparta	Founded in 1996
Saint Monica		33 Unionville Ave, Sussex	Founded in 1942, church dedicated around 1952
Saint Thomas the Apostle		210 US-206, Sandyston	Founded as a mission in 1941, became a parish in 1987, church dedicated in 2000
Saint Thomas of Aquin		53 Kennedy Ave, Ogdensburg	Founded as a mission in 1881, church dedicated in 1912

== See also ==
Roman Catholic Diocese of Paterson
