= William B. Hanna =

William Hanna
- Born: William Blythe Hanna; January 5, 1866; Plattsmouth, Nebraska
- Died: November 20, 1930 (aged 64); West Point, New York
- Occupation: American sportswriter

William Blythe Hanna (January 5, 1866 – November 20, 1930) was an American sportswriter. Starting his career The Kansas City Star in the late 1870s, Hanna moved to New York City in 1892 to join the staff of the New York Herald. He never actually left his new city of residence. Over the following decades, he variously worked for the New York Herald, the New York Press, The Sun, and finally for the Herald's successor newspaper, the New York Herald Tribune

== Career ==
Hanna was an accomplished sports journalist for more than 30 years. Although familiar with virtually all sport activities, he was an acknowledged expert on American football, baseball and billiards, while working for several New York City newspapers.

Born in Plattsmouth, Nebraska, he was the sixth child of Thomas King Hanna, a dry goods store owner, and Judith Joyce Venable, a housewife. At the age of four, he relocated with his family to Kansas City, Missouri.

In 1878 Hanna was graduated from Lafayette College in Easton, Pennsylvania, and immediately started to work at The Kansas City Star. He then moved to New York in 1892, and started a long relationship with the city and its citizens.

Hanna joined the staff of the New York Herald in 1892 and moved to the New York Press in 1893. He also wrote for The Sun from 1900 through 1916 before he returned to the Herald from 1916 to 1924. After that, he worked in the New York Herald Tribune when it bought the Herald in 1924, and remained working there through the rest of his life.

His spare writing style was marked by a specific use of language means, as well as his selection of words were those less chosen, terse, precise, kind, and greatly influenced by the lexical environment.

== Hospitalization and death ==
In May 1930, Hanna suffered a stroke (apoplexy) while reporting an Army–Dartmouth baseball game in West Point, New York. He was confined to West Point Hospital for three weeks and then, at his request, was transferred to Idylease sanitarium, at his wishes to be near to the home of his brother, Thomas K. Hanna. He died on November 20 in Newfoundland, New Jersey at the age of 64.

== Posthumous awards ==
Shortly after his death in 1930, William B. Hanna became the first recipient of the Slocum Award, which is presented annually by the New York Baseball Writers Association to a person judged to have a long and meritorious service to baseball. In 1946 he was named to the Honor Rolls of Baseball of the National Baseball Hall of Fame.
