= Cooper & Hemingway: The True Gen =

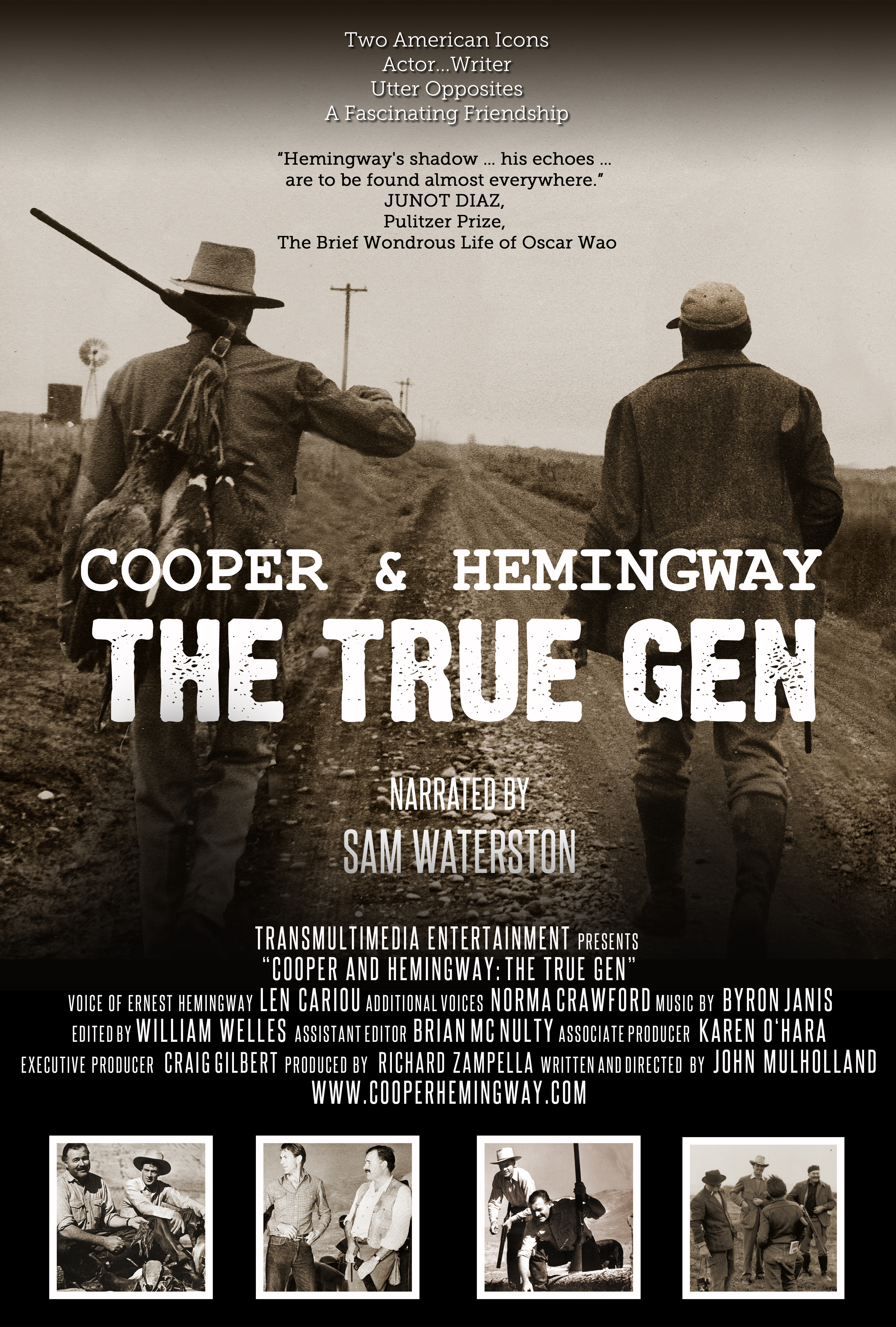
- Directed by: John Mulholland
- Written by: John Mulholland
- Produced by: Richard Zampella
- Narrated by: Sam Waterston; Len Cariou
- Cinematography: Alex Eaton
- Edited by: William Wells; Elwaldo Baptiste
- Music by: Byron Janis
- Release date: October 21, 2013
- Country: United States
- Language: English

Cooper & Hemingway: The True Gen is a 2013 documentary film about the 20-year friendship between writer Ernest Hemingway and film actor Gary Cooper. Written and directed by John Mulholland, it is narrated by actor Sam Waterston with actor Len Cariou as the voice of writer Ernest Hemingway.

== Production history ==
In researching Gary Cooper's friendship with Ernest Hemingway for an article in the Idaho Press-Tribune, writer/director John Mulholland grew increasingly fascinated by their unlikely friendship. The documentary, Cooper & Hemingway: True Gen, grew out of Mulholland's research for the article.

Prior to commencing production, Robert Osborne interviewed Mulholland on the documentary at the Museum of the Moving Image in New York City.

Gary Cooper's daughter, Maria Cooper, discussed True Gen with the Idaho Mountain Express before a rough cut screening in Sun Valley: "Though Ernest Hemingway’s extraordinary life and career has been exhaustively covered (too often the tabloid-sensationalism of this coverage has over-shadowed his unrivaled literary legacy), less thoroughly examined has been his fascinating friendship with my father, Gary Cooper".

The documentary was produced over a five-year period and features on-camera interviews with 30 subjects, including Jim Harrison, Charlton Heston, Kirk Douglas, Patricia Neal, Elmore Leonard, Robert Stack, Budd Schulberg, Bill Blass, Patrick Hemingway, and George Plimpton.

While researching True Gen in Cuba, Mulholland spoke on Cuban radio in Havana.

Prior to the film's release, Mulholland spoke about his Cooper and Hemingway documentary and its expected late 2013 release: "In the final analysis, what distinguishes the film is access—access to the colleagues and members of Ernest Hemingway’s and Gary Cooper’s inner circle that have never been assembled to discuss the lives of these two men, as well as film footage, photographs and other material that has never been seen."

On October 11, 2013, Cooper & Hemingway: The True Gen had its theatrical premiere at The Quad Cinema in New York City. The film is a feature-length documentary about the friendship between Ernest Hemingway and Gary Cooper. It was directed and written by John Mulholland and produced by Richard Zampella.

== Audience and critical reception ==
Film critics hold diverse and wide-ranging opinions of the film.

The film was reviewed by The New York Times film critic Andy Webster on October 11, 2013 and was named an NY Times Critics’ Pic by Manohla Dargis, A. O. Scott and Stephen Holden. Webster said the picture was proof that the work of these two men "endures and so does what they stood for".

James Van Maanen, film critic for Trust Movies, called the film "a first class, dual celebrity bio-doc".

Michael Nordine of the Village Voice said that the film was informative to a fault, while Robert Abele of the Los Angeles Times said, "There's an intriguing investigation to be made of the unlikely bond between an easygoing, friendly Hollywood conservative and an intemperate, hard-drinking arts-and-letters liberal who chewed on heroic ideals for a living."

In author and scholar Ron McFarland's 2014 book on Ernest Hemingway he writes: "True Gen, written and directed by John Mulholland, is exceptional, a NY Times Critics Pick, it opened in 2013 to considerable fanfare in NYC ..."

== See also ==
- Gary Cooper filmography
