= John Mulholland (director) =

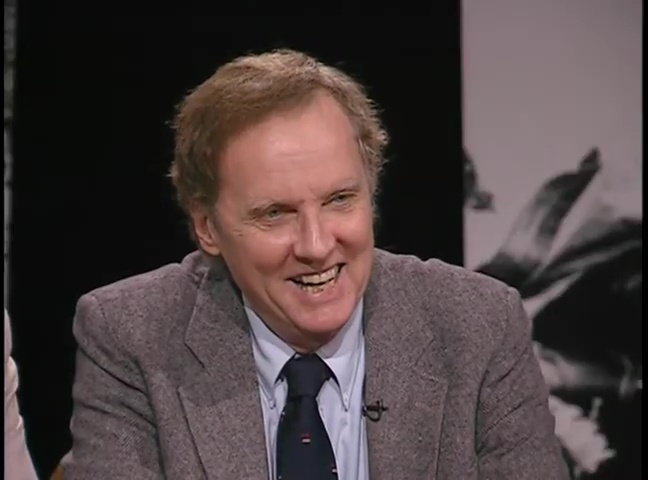
Mulhullond on CUNY TV's City Cinematheque, 2003

John Mulholland is a film historian and an American writer and director, specializing in documentaries. He was born in New York City, where he still lives. Mulholland's most recent documentary is Cooper & Hemingway: The True Gen, exploring the 20-year friendship between actor Gary Cooper and author Ernest Hemingway.

== Documentaries ==
Mulholland began writing documentaries in 1980 for ARTS, a cable channel which had been recently formed by ABC. Among some of his documentaries for ARTS, are:

- On Macbeth: Explores the troubled over-the-centuries history of staging Macbeth. (Estelle Parsons on-screen narrator)
- The Letters Of Vincent Van Gogh And Theo Van Gogh: Vincent van Gogh, as seen through his letters to his brother, Theo Van Gogh. (Leonard Nimoy on-screen narrator)
- On A Christmas Carol: Examines the complex story behind the novel, A Christmas Carol, by Charles Dickens.
- Eastern European Composers: Covers the lives and music of several composers from Eastern Europe: Chopin, Dvořák, Liszt, and Bartók (Jack Palance on-screen narrator).
- The Lake Poets: Explores the group of poets associated with the Lake District in early 19th Century England — Wordsworth, Coleridge, and Southey.

Mulholland left ARTS after it folded into Arts & Entertainment. Always interested in pre-1960s Hollywood films, Mulholland was intrigued by the posthumous reputations of such stars as Gary Cooper and Glenn Ford, and directors such as Fred Zinnemann and William Wyler, whose legacies had suffered because of the auteur theory so prevalent in critical and academic circles. Mulholland went on to explore, in two documentaries, both Cooper as actor and as central participant in the complex political controversies which almost derailed two of his most notable films:

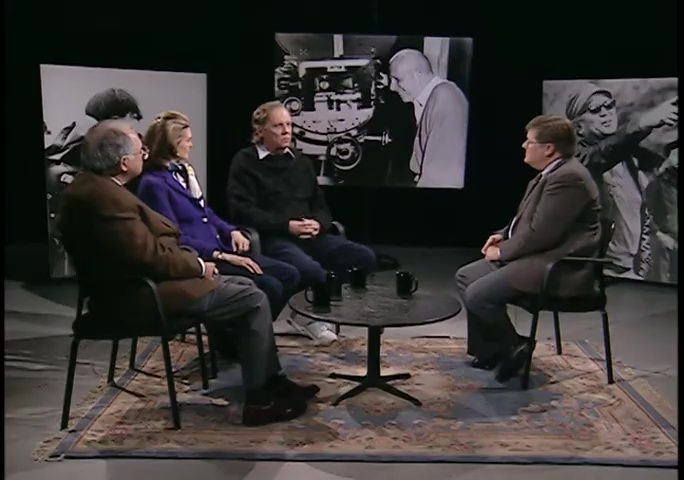
Mulholland is interviewed on CUNY TV's City Cinematheque with Patrick Hemingway and Maria Cooper Janis, 2002

- Inside High Noon: Inside High Noon examines the political and blacklisting controversy — and Cooper's integral role in combating blacklisting — during the filming of the 1952 film classic, High Noon. Frank Langella narrator (among on-camera participants: President Bill Clinton and Albert II, Prince of Monaco).
- Sergeant York: Of God And Country: The documentary examines how the 1941 classic, Sergeant York — and Cooper himself — became embroiled in the isolationist and Congressional turmoil leading up to World War II. Liam Neeson narrator.

Among some of Mulholland's other documentaries which focus on classic Hollywood, are:

- Liza Minnelli Reflecting: Liza Minnelli, solo on-camera, reflecting on her career, her parents, and her personal life.
- Reflections On Gaslight: Angela Lansbury offers first-person memories of playing — and negotiating the uneasy waters of acting in her first film — in 1944's Gaslight.
- As Time Goes By: Reflections by the children of Humphrey Bogart and Ingrid Bergman on the behind-the-scenes conflicts and animosities during the filming of Casablanca.

2013 saw the release of Mulholland's documentary Cooper & Hemingway: The True Gen, produced by Richard Zampella, narrated by Sam Waterston, with Len Cariou as the voice of Ernest Hemingway.

In 2015 Mulholland worked on a documentary on author Elmore Leonard with Richard Zampella.

== ICONS Radio Hour ==
Mulholland hosted a radio podcast show, ICONS Radio Hour, for four years, from 2007 to 2010. He interviewed both current Hollywood artists and those with first-hand knowledge of the Classic Hollywood era. At times, Mulholland was joined by author and film historian Meir Z. Ribalow.

== Declaration of Reasonable Doubt ==
Mulholland is among the list of signatories who have expressed doubts about the identity of William Shakespeare, joining such as Mark Twain, Mark Rylance, Derek Jacobi, and Supreme Court Justices Sandra Day O'Connor and John Paul Stevens, among a host of other notables.

== See also ==
- Documentary photography
- List of film and television directors
- List of authors by name: M
- List of directors and producers of documentaries
