= Lafayette School (Roxbury Township, New Jersey) =

- U.S. National Register of Historic Places
- New Jersey Register of Historic Places
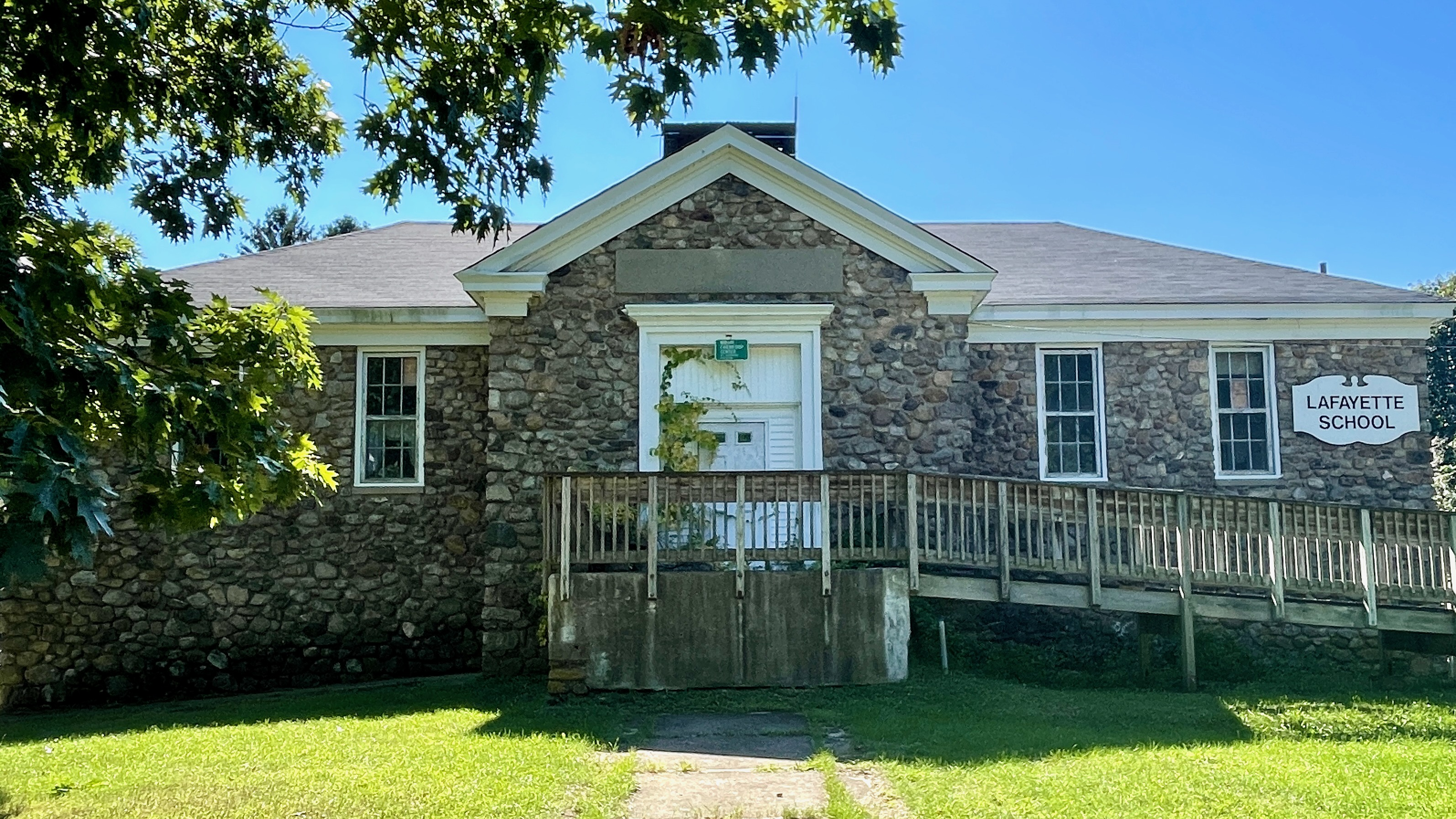

- Location within Morris County, New Jersey Location within New Jersey Location within the United States
- Location: 79 Mill Road; Roxbury Township, New Jersey
- Coordinates: 40°54′45″N 74°36′30″W
- Built: 1921
- Architect: Rasmussen and Wayland
- Architectural style: Craftsman
- NRHP reference No.: 100008044
- NJRHP No.: 5663

Significant dates
- Added to NRHP: September 1, 2022
- Designated NJRHP: July 8, 2022

Lafayette School is a fieldstone schoolhouse built in 1921 and located at 79 Mill Road in the Lower Berkshire Valley section of Roxbury Township in Morris County, New Jersey. It was added to the National Register of Historic Places on September 1, 2022, for its significance in architecture. Designed by the architectural firm of Rasmussen & Wayland (William Whitney Rasmussen and Harry C. Wayland) from New York City, the school features American Craftsman style.

== History and description ==
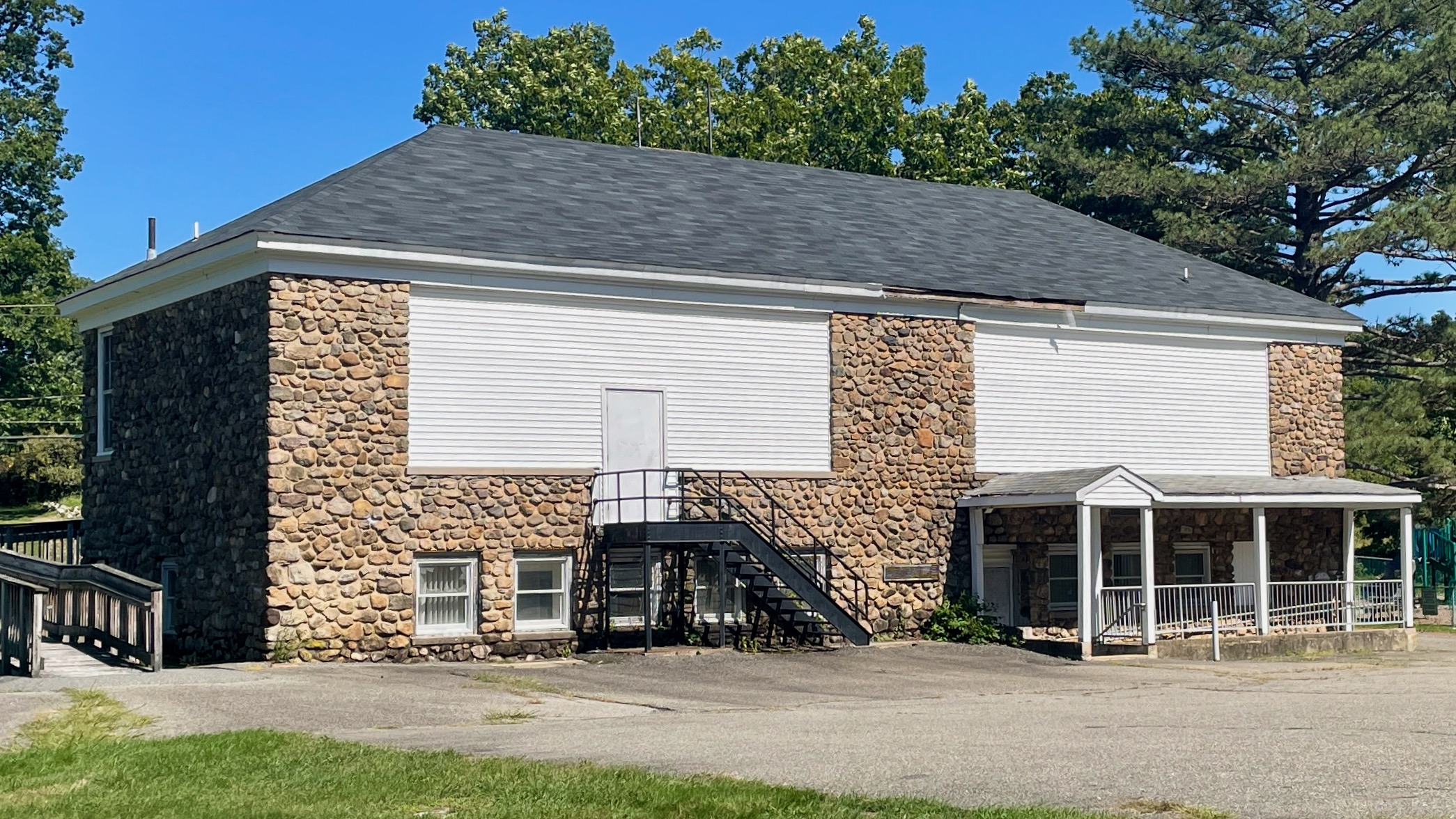
View of schoolhouse looking north

The first known schoolhouse in the valley was built c. 1850. It burned down and was replaced with another c. 1871. It was replaced by the Lafayette School, which was built as a two-room schoolhouse in 1921. The architect was the firm of Rasmussen & Wayland, who also designed several other New Jersey schools. American Craftsman and Carpenter Gothic architectural styles were featured, which emphasized the simple use of materials and craftsmanship. The general contractor was the Gallo Brothers of Netcong. The schoolhouse remained in use until 1964, when the Jefferson Elementary School was built in Succasunna. The building is currently used to store athletic equipment for Berkshire Valley Park.

== See also ==
- National Register of Historic Places listings in Morris County, New Jersey
