= Jefferson Township High School (New Jersey) =

High school in Morris County, New Jersey, US

Location
- 1010 Weldon Road; Jefferson Township, Morris County, New Jersey 07438; United States
- 41.019448°N 74.549868°W

Information
- Type: Public high school
- Established: September 1964
- School district: Jefferson Township Public Schools
- NCES School ID: 340780004264
- Principal: Michael Lonie
- Faculty: 72.4 FTEs
- Grades: 9-12
- Enrollment: 761 (as of 2024–25)
- Student to teacher ratio: 10.5:1
- Colors: Navy blue gold white
- Athletics conference: Northwest Jersey Athletic Conference (general); North Jersey Super Football Conference (football)
- Team name: Falcons
- Website: jths.jefftwp.org

Jefferson Township High School is a four-year comprehensive community public high school, serving students in ninth through twelfth grades from Jefferson Township, in Morris County, in the U.S. state of New Jersey, operating as the lone secondary school of the Jefferson Township Public Schools. The school is located in the Oak Ridge section of the township.

As of the 2024–25 school year, the school had an enrollment of 761 students and 72.4 classroom teachers (on an FTE basis), for a student–teacher ratio of 10.5:1. There were 91 students (12.0% of enrollment) eligible for free lunch and 21 (2.8% of students) eligible for reduced-cost lunch.

== History ==
Before the high school opened, more than 450 students in grades 9–12 were sent out-of-district and allocated to attend Butler High School, Franklin High School, Morris Hills High School or Randolph High School. With the receiving schools no longer able to accommodate township students, the district initiated work on a facility that would cost $2.4 million (equivalent to $25.8 million in 2025). The school opened in September 1964.

== Awards, recognition and rankings ==
The school was the 121st-ranked public high school in New Jersey out of 339 schools statewide in New Jersey Monthly magazine's September 2014 cover story on the state's "Top Public High Schools", using a new ranking methodology. The school had been ranked 211th in the state of 328 schools in 2012, after being ranked 158th in 2010 out of 322 schools listed. The magazine ranked the school 167th in 2008 out of 316 schools. The school was ranked 152nd in the magazine's September 2006 issue, which surveyed 316 schools across the state. Schooldigger.com ranked the school 186th out of 381 public high schools statewide in its 2011 rankings (a decrease of 31 positions from the 2010 ranking) which were based on the combined percentage of students classified as proficient or above proficient on the two components of the High School Proficiency Assessment (HSPA), mathematics (79.2%) and language arts literacy (93.0%). in 2024 the environmental science program won the Governor's Environmental Excellence Award for environmental education

== Athletics ==
The Jefferson Township High School Falcons compete in the Northwest Jersey Athletic Conference, a high school athletic conference comprised of schools in Morris, Sussex and Warren counties, that was created following a reorganization of sports leagues in Northern New Jersey by the New Jersey State Interscholastic Athletic Association (NJSIAA). Prior to the NJSIAA's 2009 realignment, the school had competed in the Sussex County Interscholastic League, which was primarily based in Sussex County with some schools in Morris County. With 706 students in grades 10–12, the school was classified by the NJSIAA for the 2019–20 school year as Group II for most athletic competition purposes, which included schools with an enrollment of 486 to 758 students in that grade range. The football team competes in the Patriot Blue division of the North Jersey Super Football Conference, which includes 112 schools competing in 20 divisions, making it the nation's biggest football-only high school sports league. The school was classified by the NJSIAA as Group II North for football for 2024–2026, which included schools with 484 to 683 students.

The school participates with Sparta High School in a joint ice hockey team in which Kinnelon High School is the host school / lead agency. The co-op program operates under agreements scheduled to expire at the end of the 2023–24 school year.

The boys' cross country running team won the Group I state championship in 1975 and won the Group II title in 1996.

The football team won the NJSIAA North II Group II state sectional championships in 1986 and 1987, and the North I Group II title in 2008. The 1986 team finished the season with an 11–0 record after winning the North II Group II state title with a 26–14 defeat of Dover High School in the championship game. In 2008, the team defeated Dover by a score of 28–14 to win the North II Group II state championship. The team won the 2008 North I, Group II state championship, defeating West Essex High School by a score of 21–6.

In the 2021 season, the Jefferson Township High School football team won the NJSIAA North II Group II sectional championship with a 28–7 victory over Rutherford High School during the playoffs.

The girls' track team won the Group II state indoor relay championship in 1990.

The boys' wrestling team won the North II Group II state sectional title in 1991-1996 and 2000, together with three consecutive Group II state titles from 1992 to 1994. The team won the program's third consecutive Group II state title in 1994 with a 45–14 win against Buena Regional High School. The team held the #1 ranking in the USA Today Super 25 national rankings during the 1993 season.

The girls' basketball team won the Group II state championship in 1992, defeating previously undefeated Middle Township High School by a score of 51–42 in the tournament final and advanced to the Tournament of Champions seeded fourth before falling 41–40 in the quarterfinals to fifth-seeded Egg Harbor Township High School to finish the season with a record of 28–4.

The 2001-2002 boys' varsity swim team won their first Morris County Championship four years after establishing a team under head coach Brian Palumbo. The 2009-2010 boys varsity swim team won the inaugural NJAC Northern Division Championship by going 8–0 in the conference under coach Scott Davis and Karen Gaba.

The softball team won the Group III state championship in 2003 (vs. Hamilton High School West in the finals) and won the 2004 Group II state title, defeating Sterling High School 2–0 in the championship game.

The ice hockey team won the Haas Cup in 2007.

The girls cheerleading team won the final Sussex County Interscholastic League champions in 2008 against defending champions the Vernon Vikings. The 2008–09 and the 2011–2012 teams won the National Championship title which was held in Baltimore.

The girls' track and field team won their divisional, county and conference titles in spring of 2013. Their 100-meter relay team was also two-time county champions, 2013 group champions, as well as the county record holder.

== Controversy ==
In 2012, a former teacher received $500,000 in an age discrimination suit filed against the school district, after claiming that she had been subjected to a pattern of harassment when she decided not to retire, despite having had received consistent positive evaluations from supervisors in previous years.

== Administration ==
The school's principal is Michael Lonie. His core administration team includes two assistant principals.

== Notable alumni ==
- Derek Drymon (born 1969, class of 1987), animator and storyboard artist, who is one of the creators of SpongeBob SquarePants
- Mike Leach (born 1976), former American football player who played in the NFL
- Bob Malone (born 1965, class of 1984), keyboardist, singer and songwriter
- Deonna Purrazzo (born 1994, class of 2012), professional wrestler
- Douglas Yeo (born 1955, class of 1973), bass trombonist
