= Jefferson Township, New Jersey =

Township in Morris County, New Jersey, US

- Township
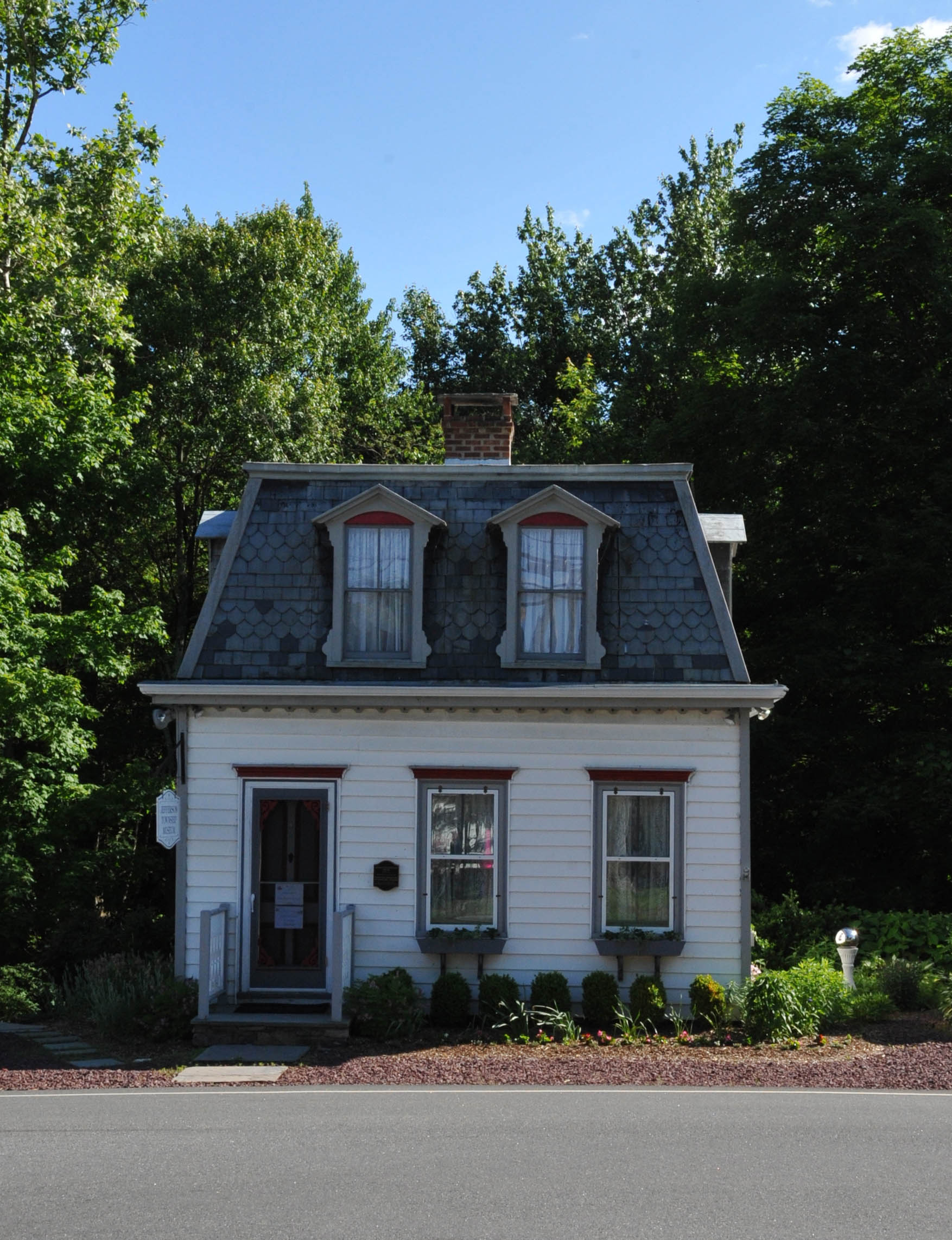
- George Chamberlain House

- Seal
- Interactive map of Jefferson Township, New Jersey
- Location in Morris County Location in New Jersey Location in the United States
- Coordinates: 41.001267°N 74.551188°W
- Country: United States
- State: New Jersey
- County: Morris
- Incorporated: February 11, 1804
- Named for: Thomas Jefferson

Government
  - Type: Faulkner Act (mayor–council)
  - Body: Township Council
  - Mayor: Eric Wilsusen (R, term ends December 31, 2026)
  - Administrator: Debra Millikin
  - Municipal Clerk: Jo Anna Myung

Area
  - Total: 42.77 sq mi (110.78 km^{2})
  - Land: 38.90 sq mi (100.75 km^{2})
  - Water: 3.88 sq mi (10.04 km^{2}) 9.06%
  - Rank: 46th of 565 in state 3rd of 39 in county
- Elevation: 1,142 ft (348 m)

Population (2020)
  - Total: 20,538
  - Estimate (2023): 20,534
  - Rank: 134th of 565 in state 8th of 39 in county
  - Density: 527.9/sq mi (203.8/km^{2})
  - Rank: 441st of 565 in state 35th of 39 in county
- Time zone: UTC−05:00 (Eastern (EST))
  - Summer (DST): UTC−04:00 (Eastern (EDT))
- ZIP Code: 07435 – Newfoundland; 07438 – Oak Ridge; 07849 – Lake Hopatcong; 07885 – Wharton
- Area code: 973
- FIPS code: 3402734980
- GNIS feature ID: 0882210
- Website: www.jeffersontownship.net

Jefferson Township is the northernmost township in Morris County, in the U.S. state of New Jersey. As of the 2020 United States census, the township's population was 20,538, a decrease of 776 (−3.6%) from the 2010 census count of 21,314, which in turn reflected an increase of 1,597 (+8.1%) from the 19,717 counted in the 2000 census.

Jefferson Township was formed as a township by an act of the New Jersey Legislature on February 11, 1804, from portions of Pequannock Township and Roxbury. The township was named after Thomas Jefferson, the President of the United States at the time the Township was created. The township is situated in the northernmost part of Morris County bordering both Passaic and Sussex counties.

== Geography ==
According to the United States Census Bureau, the township had a total area of 42.77 square miles (110.8 km^{2}), including 38.90 square miles (100.8 km^{2}) of land and 3.88 square miles (10.0 km^{2}) of water (9.06%).

The township borders Mount Arlington, Rockaway Township, Roxbury and Wharton in Morris County; West Milford in Passaic County; and Hardyston Township, Hopatcong and Sparta in Sussex County.

The township has two large divisions, Milton and Lake Hopatcong. Each half has its own first-aid squad, fire department substation and set of elementary schools. Addresses in the Milton section of the township are classified under the Oak Ridge mailing city, which is shared with a portion of West Milford, or in the Newfoundland mailing area, shared with a portion of West Milford and Rockaway Township. Addresses in Lake Hopatcong use either Lake Hopatcong (not to be confused with the Hopatcong mailing city used in the Borough of Hopatcong) or Wharton as their mailing city. In 2016, there was an effort to change the mailing address for the Lake Shawnee section of town from a Wharton, NJ 07885 ZIP code, to a Lake Hopatcong, NJ 07849 ZIP code. The effort was narrowly defeated. In 2026, a new effort will be made to change the mailing address ZIP code to Lake Hopatcong, NJ 07849. The Jefferson Township Municipal Building, Middle School, High School, Recycling Center and school bus depot are positioned at the boundary between the two halves of the township.

Unincorporated communities, localities and place names located partially or completely within the township include Berkshire Valley, Bowling Green Mountain, Cozy Lake, Espanong, Halsey Island, Hurdtown, Lake Forest, Lake Hopatcong, Lake Swannanoa, Lake Shawnee, Lake Winona, Longwood Mountains, Lower Berkshire Valley, Lower Longwood, Minisink, Moosepac Pond, Newfoundland, Nolans Point, Oak Ridge, Petersburg, Prospect Point, Raccoon Island, Russia, Upper Longwood, Weldon, Woodport, White Rock, and Woodstock.

As of 2018 some residents on the portion along Lake Hoptacong with "Wharton" postal addresses state that they are from "Lake Shawnee"; people in that area, as of that year, do not state they are from "Wharton". Residents in the lake areas in the township state they are from particular localities. As of that year, in the section of Oak Ridge in Jefferson Township, the people there state they are from "Milton".

Portions of the township are owned by the City of Newark, Essex County, for its Pequannock River Watershed, which provides water to the city from an area of 35,000 acres (14,000 ha) that also includes portions of Hardyston Township, Kinnelon, Rockaway Township, Vernon Township, and West Milford.

== Demographics ==
Historical population
Census	Pop.	Note	%±
1810	1,281		—
1820	1,231		−3.9%
1830	1,551		26.0%
1840	1,412		−9.0%
1850	1,358		−3.8%
1860	1,471		8.3%
1870	1,430		−2.8%
1880	1,792		25.3%
1890	1,611		−10.1%
1900	1,341		−16.8%
1910	1,303		−2.8%
1920	1,226		−5.9%
1930	1,254		2.3%
1940	1,548		23.4%
1950	2,744		77.3%
1960	6,884		150.9%
1970	14,122		105.1%
1980	16,413		16.2%
1990	17,825		8.6%
2000	19,717		10.6%
2010	21,314		8.1%
2020	20,538		−3.6%
2023 (est.)	20,534		0.0%
Population sources: 1810–1920 1840; 1850–1870 1850; 1870 1880–1890; 1890–1910 1910–1930; 1900–1990 2000; 2010 2020

2020 Census

The 2020 census counted 20,703 people, 8,340 households. The population density was 527.9 per square mile (203.8/km^{2}). The racial makeup was 76.3% (15,711) White, 2.6% (543) Black or African American, 0% (9) Native American, 3.4% (900) Asian, 0% (0) Pacific Islander, 0.3% (54) from other races, and 2.6% (939) from two or more races. Hispanic or Latino of any race were 12.8% (2,631) of the population.

Among the Asian population, largest ancestry groups were Indian, 426 (2.06%), followed by Filipinos, 113 (0.5%), and Chinese 93 (0.4%).Among Hispanics and Latinos, the largest ancestry groups were Puerto Rican, 588 (2.9%), followed by Spaniard 445 (2.2%), and Dominican, 354 (1.7%).

=== 2010 census ===
The 2010 United States census counted 21,314 people, 7,830 households, and 5,794 families in the township. The population density was 544.7 per square mile (210.3/km^{2}). There were 8,597 housing units at an average density of 219.7 per square mile (84.8/km^{2}). The racial makeup was 90.64% (19,318) White, 1.56% (332) Black or African American, 0.08% (18) Native American, 4.60% (981) Asian, 0.02% (4) Pacific Islander, 1.49% (317) from other races, and 1.61% (344) from two or more races. Hispanic or Latino of any race were 6.48% (1,382) of the population.

Of the 7,830 households, 35.6% had children under the age of 18; 62.0% were married couples living together; 8.1% had a female householder with no husband present and 26.0% were non-families. Of all households, 20.7% were made up of individuals and 7.1% had someone living alone who was 65 years of age or older. The average household size was 2.72 and the average family size was 3.19.

24.6% of the population were under the age of 18, 7.1% from 18 to 24, 25.8% from 25 to 44, 31.7% from 45 to 64, and 10.8% who were 65 years of age or older. The median age was 40.9 years. For every 100 females, the population had 100.5 males. For every 100 females ages 18 and older there were 98.3 males.

The Census Bureau's 2006–2010 American Community Survey showed that (in 2010 inflation-adjusted dollars) median household income was $92,095 (with a margin of error of +/− $6,923) and the median family income was $102,324 (+/− $6,788). Males had a median income of $73,152 (+/− $3,827) versus $51,933 (+/− $2,776) for females. The per capita income for the borough was $37,912 (+/− $1,795). About 2.6% of families and 3.5% of the population were below the poverty line, including 3.2% of those under age 18 and 4.2% of those age 65 or over.

=== 2000 census ===
As of the 2000 United States census there were 19,717 people, 7,131 households, and 5,448 families residing in the township. The population density was 485.3 people per square mile (187.4 people/km^{2}). There were 7,527 housing units at an average density of 185.2 per square mile (71.5/km^{2}). The racial makeup of the township was 96.14% White, 0.83% African American, 0.16% Native American, 1.07% Asian, 0.05% Pacific Islander, 0.62% from other races, and 1.14% from two or more races. Hispanic or Latino of any race were 3.41% of the population.

As of the 2000 Census, 25.7% of residents identified their ancestry as Italian, 22.9% Irish, 21.7% German, 11.6% English and 10.0% Polish.

There were 7,131 households, out of which 38.8% had children under the age of 18 living with them, 65.5% were married couples living together, 7.7% had a female householder with no husband present, and 23.6% were non-families. 18.5% of all households were made up of individuals, and 6.0% had someone living alone who was 65 years of age or older. The average household size was 2.76 and the average family size was 3.17.

In the township the age distribution of the population shows 26.9% under the age of 18, 5.5% from 18 to 24, 33.8% from 25 to 44, 25.2% from 45 to 64, and 8.6% who were 65 years of age or older. The median age was 37 years. For every 100 females, there were 98.3 males. For every 100 females age 18 and over, there were 96.8 males.

The median income for a household in the township was $68,837, and the median income for a family was $76,974. Males had a median income of $51,359 versus $37,849 for females. The per capita income for the township was $27,950. About 1.0% of families and 2.4% of the population were below the poverty line, including 2.2% of those under age 18 and 4.3% of those age 65 or over.

== Arts and culture ==
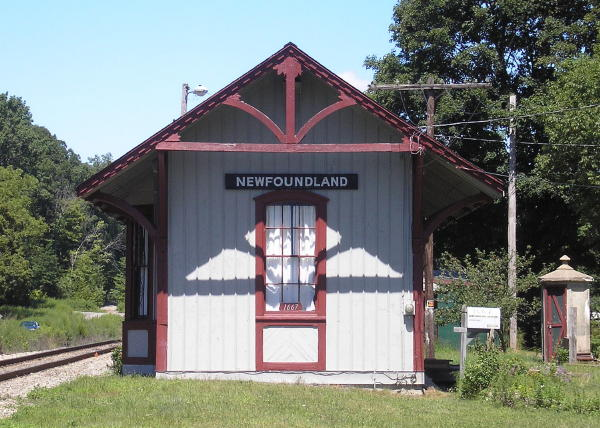
Newfoundland Train Station

Every year, the weekend following Independence Day, The Jefferson Arts Committee hosts a day of celebration known as Jefferson Township Day (it is colloquially referred to as "Jefferson Day"). Throughout the entire day, entertainment and festivities at the Jefferson Township High School are provided. Up until 2012 there would be a morning parade featuring the town's fire trucks, high school marching band and other local groups march down Weldon Road. Starting in 2013 the parade has been substituted with various activities such as a fishing contest, kids kart race and a road bowling tournament. There are a variety of activities set up on the Jefferson Township High School grounds for participants of Jefferson Day, including children's games, food and craft vendors, and performances at two stages. At night, the Jefferson Township Community Band, directed by Peter Tummillo Jr., performs before the display of fireworks. Township resident Bill Child wrote an original song in September 2006, "My Sweet Home Jefferson", that has since been sung at many Jefferson Day celebrations.

Amos Chamberlain built the George Chamberlain House as a wedding gift for his son George Chamberlain. George Chamberlain and his wife Ruth Elizabeth Speaker had two children, Raymond and Archie Chamberlain, who lived in the house until the 1890s, when the Chamberlain family moved out, and started renting the house to people up until 1960. The house was purchased from the Chamberlain family by the Friends of the Library in 1960, and refurbished the building for 19 years in order to turn it into a library, which they opened in 1979. From 1979 to 1982, the house was the Violet Riker Library, named after Violet Riker, who first initiated public library service in Jefferson. In 1982, the township acquired the library and began the process of turning it into a museum, after Emily Panek got a grant of $15,000 and $27,000 in donations. By 1984 the building had been completely repaired after they sandblasted the walls, replaced a hole in the front door, repaired the windows, and replaced the chestnut floors. The house is currently the Jefferson Township Museum.

== Government ==
=== Local government ===
Jefferson Township is governed under a Mayor-Council system of municipal government under the Faulkner Act. The township is one of 71 (of the 564) municipalities statewide that use this form of government. The governing body is comprised of the Mayor and the five-member Township Council. All governing body officials are elected at-large in partisan elections to serve four-year terms on a staggered basis in even-numbered years as part of the November general election, with three council seats up together for election and then two council seats and the mayoral seat coming up for election together two years later.

As of 2023, the Mayor of Jefferson Township is Republican Eric Wilsusen, whose term of office ends December 31, 2026. Members of the Jefferson Township Council Melissa Senatore (R, 2026), Council Vice President Barbie Garruto (R, 2026), Robert Birmingham (R, 2026), Council President Josh Kalish (R, 2026) and Yvonne Ioffredo (R, 2026).

In March 2021, Josh Kalish was selected from a list of three candidates nominated by the Republican municipal committee to fill the council seat expiring in December 2022 that had been held by Debi Merz Bennett until she stepped down from office the previous month. Kalish served on an interim basis until the November 2021 general election, when he was elected to serve the balance of the term of office.

In May 2017, Michael J. Sanchelli resigned from his seat expiring in December 2018, after being mandated to leave office due to issues related to his state pension which require him to be out of office for 180 days.

In April 2016, the Township Council selected Kimberly Finnegan from three candidates nominated by the Republican municipal committee to fill the seat expiring in December 2016 that had been held by Richard W. Yocum until his resignation.

=== Federal, state, and county representation ===
Jefferson Township is located in the 11th Congressional District and is part of New Jersey's 25th state legislative district.

Prior to the 2011 reapportionment following the 2010 census, Jefferson Township had been in the 25th state legislative district.

For the 119th United States Congress, New Jersey's 11th congressional district is represented by Analilia Mejia (D, Glen Ridge) who was elected in a 2026 special election to serve for the remainder of the Congress following the resignation Mikie Sherrill (D, Montclair), who was elected Governor of New Jersey in 2025. New Jersey is represented in the United States Senate by Democrats Cory Booker (Newark, term ends 2027) and Andy Kim (Moorestown, term ends 2031).

For the 2026–2027 session, the 25th legislative district of the New Jersey Legislature is represented in the State Senate by Anthony M. Bucco (R, Boonton Township) and in the General Assembly by Aura K. Dunn (R, Mendham Borough) and Marisa Sweeney (D, Morristown).

Morris County is governed by a Board of County Commissioners comprised of seven members who are elected at-large in partisan elections to three-year terms on a staggered basis, with either one or three seats up for election each year as part of the November general election. Actual day-to-day operation of departments is supervised by County Administrator Deena Leary.

As of 2026, Morris County's Commissioners (with all terms ending December 31) are Director Stephen H. Shaw (R, Mountain Lakes, 2027), Deputy Director John Krickus (R, Washington Township, 2027), Douglas Cabana (R, Boonton Township, 2028), Thomas J. Mastrangelo (R, Montville, 2028), Christine Myers (R, Harding Township, 2028), Tayfun Selen (R, Chatham Township, 2026), and Deborah Smith (R, Denville Township, 2027).

The county's constitutional officers are County Clerk Ann F. Grossi (R, Parsippany–Troy Hills, 2028), Sheriff James M. Gannon (R, Boonton Township, 2025) and Surrogate Heather Darling (R, Roxbury, 2029).

=== Electoral history ===
United States presidential election results for Jefferson Township 2024 2020 2016 2012 2008 2004
Year	Republican		Democratic		Third party(ies)	
Year	No.	%	No.	%	No.	%
2024	7,604	62.37%	4,398	36.07%	190	1.56%
2020	7,443	58.33%	5,117	40.10%	200	1.57%
2016	6,364	60.81%	3,716	35.51%	386	3.69%
2012	5,370	58.24%	3,757	40.74%	94	1.02%
2008	6,040	57.55%	4,335	41.30%	121	1.15%
2004	5,946	62.03%	3,542	36.95%	97	1.01%

As of March 2011, there were a total of 13,142 registered voters in Jefferson Township, of which 2,395 (18.2%) were registered as Democrats, 4,347 (33.1%) were registered as Republicans and 6,392 (48.6%) were registered as Unaffiliated. There were 8 voters registered as Libertarians or Greens.

Gubernatorial election results for Jefferson Township
Year	Republican		Democratic		Third party(ies)	
Year	No.	%	No.	%	No.	%
2025	5,757	59.67%	3,845	39.85%	46	0.48%
2021	5,414	67.00%	2,610	32.30%	56	0.69%
2017	3,437	60.12%	2,162	37.82%	118	2.06%
2013	4,043	70.58%	1,596	27.86%	89	1.55%
2009	4,270	63.66%	1,809	26.97%	628	9.36%
2005	3,263	58.35%	2,109	37.71%	220	3.93%

In the 2012 presidential election, Republican Mitt Romney received 58.2% of the vote (5,370 cast), ahead of Democrat Barack Obama with 40.7% (3,757 votes), and other candidates with 1.0% (94 votes), among the 9,279 ballots cast by the township's 13,742 registered voters (58 ballots were spoiled), for a turnout of 67.5%. In the 2008 presidential election, Republican John McCain received 57.2% of the vote (6,040 cast), ahead of Democrat Barack Obama with 41.0% (4,335 votes) and other candidates with 1.1% (121 votes), among the 10,564 ballots cast by the township's 13,631 registered voters, for a turnout of 77.5%. In the 2004 presidential election, Republican George W. Bush received 61.9% of the vote (5,946 ballots cast), outpolling Democrat John Kerry with 36.9% (3,542 votes) and other candidates with 0.8% (97 votes), among the 9,605 ballots cast by the township's 12,847 registered voters, for a turnout percentage of 74.8.

In the 2013 gubernatorial election, Republican Chris Christie received 70.6% of the vote (4,043 cast), ahead of Democrat Barbara Buono with 27.9% (1,596 votes), and other candidates with 1.6% (89 votes), among the 5,789 ballots cast by the township's 13,715 registered voters (61 ballots were spoiled), for a turnout of 42.2%. In the 2009 gubernatorial election, Republican Chris Christie received 63.4% of the vote (4,270 ballots cast), ahead of Democrat Jon Corzine with 26.8% (1,809 votes), Independent Chris Daggett with 8.5% (572 votes) and other candidates with 0.8% (56 votes), among the 6,738 ballots cast by the township's 13,397 registered voters, yielding a 50.3% turnout.

United States Senate election results for Jefferson Township1
Year	Republican		Democratic		Third party(ies)	
Year	No.	%	No.	%	No.	%
2024	7,024	61.62%	4,176	36.63%	199	1.75%
2018	5,270	62.21%	2,932	34.61%	269	3.18%
2012	4,793	56.91%	3,534	41.96%	95	1.13%
2006	3,404	60.23%	2,108	37.30%	140	2.48%

United States Senate election results for Jefferson Township2
Year	Republican		Democratic		Third party(ies)	
Year	No.	%	No.	%	No.	%
2020	7,097	57.95%	4,977	40.64%	172	1.40%
2014	2,733	62.64%	1,620	37.13%	10	0.23%
2013	2,428	63.28%	1,370	35.70%	39	1.02%
2008	5,511	58.35%	3,777	39.99%	156	1.65%

2026 Jefferson Township mayoral Republican primary
Party	Candidate	Votes	%
Republican	Eric Wilsusen (Incumbent)	TBD	—
Republican	Christian Barranco	TBD	—
Total votes		—	—

2026 Jefferson Township Council Republican primary
Party	Candidate	Votes	%
Republican	Melissa Senatore (Incumbent)	TBD	—
Republican	Tom "Farmer Tom" Galfo	TBD	—
Republican	Sheila J. Brown	TBD	—
Republican	Dottie Santasieri	TBD	—
Total votes		—	—

2024 Jefferson Township Council election
Party	Candidate	Votes	%
Republican	Barbara Garutto	6,920	21.7
Republican	Robert A. Birmingham (incumbent)	6,900	21.7
Republican	Daniel Schultz	6,875	21.6
Democratic	Elizabeth McMahon	3,740	11.7
Democratic	Janice Bakera	3,723	11.7
Democratic	Anne Augustyn	3,701	11.6
Total votes		31,859	100.0
Republican hold			
Republican hold			
Republican hold			

2024 Jefferson Township Council Republican primary
Party	Candidate	Votes	%
Republican	Daniel Schultz	1,503	30.9
Republican	Barbara Garruto	1,456	29.9
Republican	Robert A. Birmingham (incumbent)	1,391	28.6
Republican	H. Ronald Smith (incumbent)	517	10.6
Total votes		4,867	100.0

2022 Jefferson Township mayoral election
Party	Candidate	Votes	%
Republican	Eric Wilsusen	6,266	100.0
Republican hold			

2022 Jefferson Township Council election
Party	Candidate	Votes	%
Republican	Melissa Senatore	5,134	34.1
Republican	Josh H. Kalish	5,075	33.7
Democratic	Pamela Fadden	2,459	16.3
Democratic	Keith Peters	2,374	15.7
Total votes		7,593	100.0
Republican hold			
Republican hold			

2020 Jefferson Township Council election
Party	Candidate	Votes	%
Republican	Jay Dunham	7,482	21.1
Republican	Robert A. Birmingham (incumbent)	7,308	20.7
Republican	H. Ronald Smith (incumbent)	7,287	20.6
Democratic	Pamela Fadden	4,473	12.6
Democratic	Keith Peters	4,470	12.6
Democratic	Maria Short	4,373	12.4
Total votes		11,955	100.0
Republican hold			
Republican hold			
Republican hold			

2018 Jefferson Township mayoral election
Party	Candidate	Votes	%
Republican	Eric Wilsusen	5,801	100.0
Republican hold			

2018 Jefferson Township mayoral Republican primary
Party	Candidate	Votes	%
Republican	Eric Wilsusen	1,445	57.9
Republican	Russell Felter (incumbent)	1,048	42.1
Total votes		2,493	100.0

2018 Jefferson Township Council election
Party	Candidate	Votes	%
Republican	Melissa Senatore	4,816	32.7
Republican	Debi Merz (incumbent)	4,739	32.2
Democratic	Daniel S. Malloy	2,669	18.1
Democratic	Douglas Helmstetter	2,490	16.9
Total votes		7,485	100.0
Republican hold			
Republican hold			

2018 Jefferson Township Council Republican primary
Party	Candidate	Votes	%
Republican	Melissa Senatore	999	22.3
Republican	Debi Merz (incumbent)	937	20.9
Republican	H. Ronald Smith (incumbent)	888	19.8
Republican	Patty Fallon	887	19.8
Republican	Robert Vander Ploeg Jr.	767	17.1
Total votes		4,478	100.0

2016 Jefferson Township Council Republican primary
Party	Candidate	Votes	%
Republican	Jayn Dunham (incumbent)	1,416	29.2
Republican	Robert A. Birmingham	1,383	28.5
Republican	Kim Finnegan	1,263	26
Republican	John J. Elam	777	16
Write-in		7	0.1
Total votes		4,846	100.0

Sources.

== Education ==
The Jefferson Township Public Schools serve students in pre-kindergarten through twelfth grade. As of the 2023–24 school year, the district, comprised of six schools, had an enrollment of 2,672 students and 246.7 classroom teachers (on an FTE basis), for a student–teacher ratio of 10.8:1. Schools in the district (with 2023–24 enrollment data from the National Center for Education Statistics) are Ellen T. Briggs Elementary School with 213 students in grades PreK–K, Cozy Lake Elementary School had 211 students in grades PreK–K (closed after the 2024–25 school year), Arthur T. Stanlick Elementary School with 396 students in grades 1–5, White Rock Elementary School with 479 students in grades 1–5, Jefferson Township Intermediate School with 563 students in grades 6–8 and Jefferson Township High School with 791 students in grades 9–12.

== Transportation ==
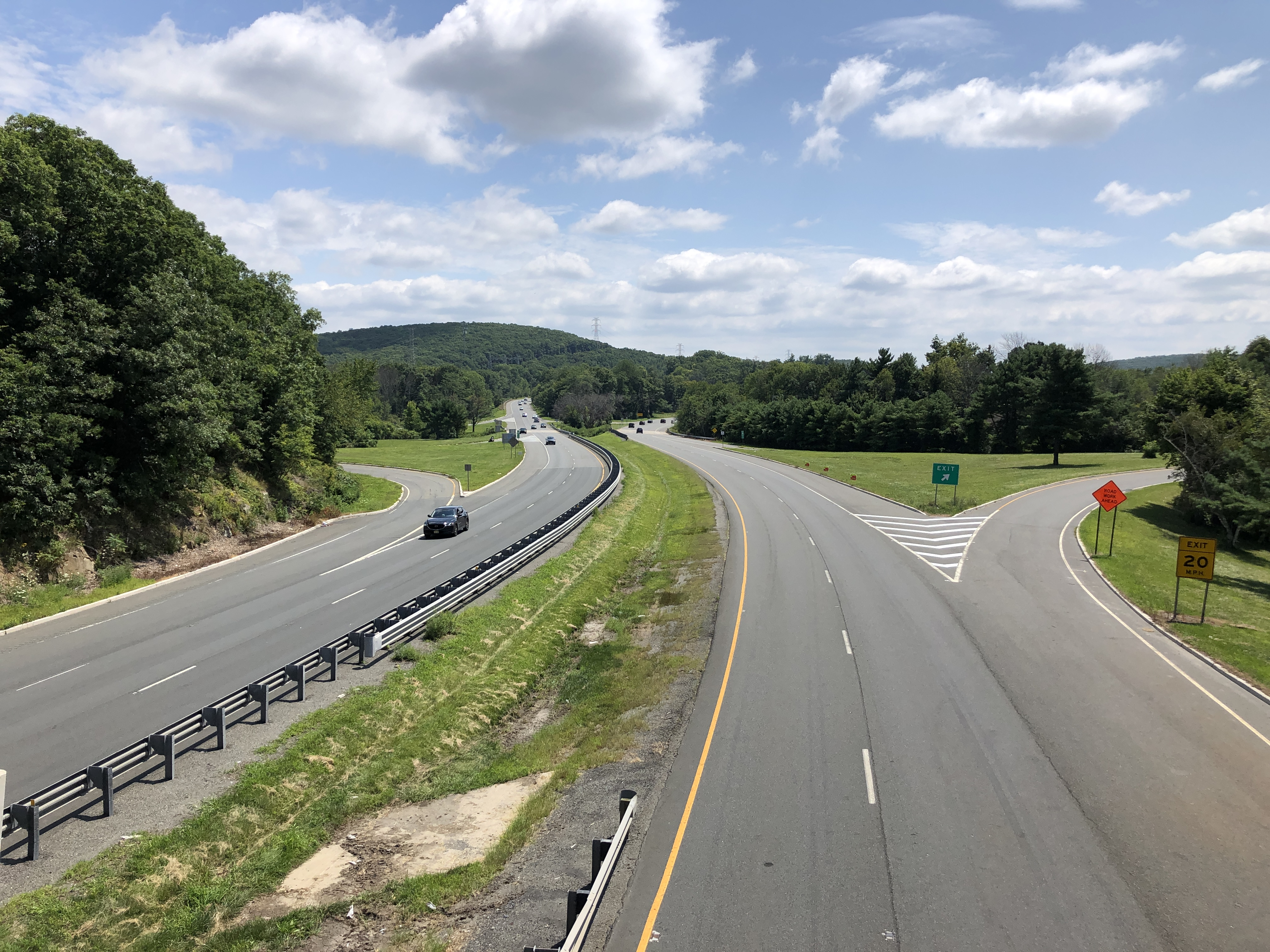
Route 15 in Jefferson Township

=== Roads and highways ===
As of May 2010, the township had a total of 133.62 miles (215.04 km) of roadways, of which 112.52 miles (181.08 km) were maintained by the municipality, 12.77 miles (20.55 km) by Morris County and 8.33 miles (13.41 km) by the New Jersey Department of Transportation.

A few major roads pass through Jefferson Township. Interstate 80 passes through very briefly in the southern tip without any interchanges; the closest exits are 30 in Mount Arlington and 34 in neighboring Wharton. State routes include Route 15 (part of the "Sparta Bypass") in the southwest, Route 23 in the northeast (as it straddles the Passaic County border) and Route 181 in the southwest. Green Pond Road, officially CR 513, is the only major county road that passes through for a short stretch in the northeast section.

=== Public transportation ===
NJ Transit had provided local bus service on the 967 and MCM7 routes, which was terminated in 2010 after subsidies to local route operators were eliminated as part of budget cuts.

Lakeland Bus Lines provides service along Interstate 80 operating between Newton and the Port Authority Bus Terminal in Midtown Manhattan.

== Notable people ==
People who were born in, residents of, or otherwise closely associated with Jefferson Township include:

- Derek Drymon (born 1968), former creative director on SpongeBob SquarePants
- Tim Jacobus (born 1959), artist best known for illustrating the covers for nearly one hundred books in R. L. Stine's Goosebumps series
- Mike Leach (born 1976), former NFL tight end for the Denver Broncos and long snapper for the Arizona Cardinals
- Bob Malone (born 1965), keyboardist, singer and songwriter
- Deonna Purrazzo (born 1994), professional wrestler for All Elite Wrestling
- Jerry Reese (born 1963), former General Manager of the New York Giants
- Jaren Sina (born 1994), professional basketball player, who played for Astoria Bydgoszcz of the Polish Basketball League
- Douglas Yeo (born 1955), bass trombonist
