= Jaren Sina =

Kosovan-American basketball player

Free Agent
- Position: Point guard

Personal information
- Born: March 12, 1994 (age 32) Figueira da Foz, Portugal
- Listed height: 6 ft 2 in (1.88 m)
- Listed weight: 187 lb (85 kg)

Career information
- High school: Gill St. Bernard's School (Peapack-Gladstone, New Jersey)
- College: Seton Hall (2013–2015); George Washington (2016–2017)
- NBA draft: 2017: undrafted
- Playing career: 2017–present

Career history

Playing
- 2017–2018: Rapla
- 2018: ADA Blois
- 2018–2019: Flyers Wels
- 2020: Astoria Bydgoszcz

Coaching
- 2021–present: Gill St. Bernard's School

Career highlights
- Pro B champion (2018); Big East All-Rookie Team (2014)

Jaren Sina (born March 12, 1994) is a Kosovan-American professional basketball player, who lastly played for Astoria Bydgoszcz of the Polish Basketball League. He played college basketball for the Seton Hall Pirates and George Washington Colonials.

== Personal ==
Born in Figueira da Foz, Portugal to Kosovo-Albanians parents Jill and Mergin Sina, who originate from Dibër, Albania, he was raised in the Lake Hopatcong section of Jefferson Township, New Jersey, USA. Mergin played basketball professionally in Belgium, Spain, Italy, Argentina and Portugal. In Portugal, he was inducted into the Hall of Fame and holds the country's single-game scoring record, with 69 points in a single game. Sina's sister Jasmine is a member of the St. John's Red Storm women's basketball team.

== High school career ==
Sina was three-time All-State guard who scored 2,146 points, breaking Jeffrey Dangelmajer's all-time scoring record, and handed out 861 assists at Gill St. Bernard's School. Also was four-star recruit who ranked in the top-100 nationally in the 2013 class by ESPN.com. He was three-time Somerset County Player of the Year who helped transform Gill St. Bernard's into a national power. The Knights broke into the USA Today High School top 25, rising as high as No. 15 in 2012. Also played for his father, Mergin Sina, who was a two-year letterwinner at Seton Hall (1984–86). He finished as the all-time leading scorer and assist leader in Somerset County history, and was second in three-pointers. As a senior, he led Gill St. Bernard's averaging 21.3 points, 9.1 assists and tallying 117 threes.

== College career ==
In his freshman season he was Big East Conference All-Rookie Team selection, also earned Big East Conference Academic All-Star recognition. Sina was one of two players to appear in all 34 games, earning 19 starts. He started eight of the final nine games, including all three Big East Conference Tournament contests. He averaged 6.0 points, 2.4 assists and 1.4 rebounds, and led the team in assists seven times and had three 5-plus-assist games. He ranked 10th in the conference shooting 38.2% (39–102) from three-point range in Big East games. He also made starts in nine of 18 Big East appearances and averaged 2.7 assists (2.4 assist-to-turnover ratio) in conference starts.

In 2015, Sina decided to transfer from Seton Hall due to what he called "an untenable locker-room situation." He had averaged 7.0 points per game. He transferred to George Washington, and after sitting out a season due to NCAA transfer rules, he started 34 of GW's 35 games at point guard, averaging 9 points and 3.3 assists per game. He graduated from George Washington in 2016 and rather than return for a graduate year, he signed with an agent to play professionally in Europe, which also made him automatically eligible for the 2017 NBA draft due to him leaving as a redshirt junior.

== Professional career ==
After going undrafted, Sina joined AVIS Utilitas Rapla of the Estonian Korvpalli Meistriliiga (KML). Sina departed Rapla, and later went to France to join Pro B side ADA Blois Basket 41 as a free agent. With Blois, he won the Pro B championship and gained promotion to the French top-tier Pro A. On October 3, 2018, Sina signed with Austrian club Flyers Wels.
