= Richard Zampella =

American film and multimedia producer (born 1966)

- Born: Richard C. Zampella; March 30, 1966 (age 60); Pompton Plains, New Jersey, U.S.
- Occupation: Film Producer
- Years active: 2006–present

Richard Zampella is an American film and multimedia producer who has collaborated with John Mulholland on three documentary films including Sergeant York of God & Country (Warner Home Video, narrated by Liam Neeson), Inside High Noon (Lions Gate Entertainment, narrated by Matthew Rhys) and Cooper & Hemingway: The True Gen, narrated by Sam Waterston. Cooper & Hemingway: The True Gen was reviewed by The New York Times film critic Andy Webster on October 11, 2013, and was named an NY Times Critics' Pick by Manohla Dargis, A. O. Scott and Stephen Holden. Webster said the picture was proof that the work of these two men "endures and so does what they stood for".

Zampella produced the 110th anniversary birthday celebration of jazz legend Duke Ellington in conjunction with the Mayor's Office of New York City and the MTA when Mayor Michael Bloomberg designated "Duke Ellington Day" to celebrate the anniversary of the jazz legend's birth.

On September 11, 2015, Zampella received an Editor's Pick from CNN for his report/photo essay on the 14th anniversary of the September 11, 2001 attack.

Zampella was born in Pompton Plains, New Jersey, and resides in New York City.

== Documentaries ==
Richard Zampella began his collaboration with director John Mulholland as his producing partner in 2006 and has served as producer for the following John Mulholland films.

- Inside High Noon: Inside High Noon examines the political and blacklisting controversy — and Cooper's integral role in combating blacklisting — during the filming of the 1952 film classic, High Noon. Frank Langella narrator (among on-camera participants: President Bill Clinton and Albert II, Prince of Monaco).
- Sergeant York: Of God And Country: The documentary examines how the 1941 classic, Sergeant York — and Cooper himself — became embroiled in the isolationist and Congressional turmoil leading up to World War II. Liam Neeson narrator.

Zampella & Mulholland's 2013 documentary Cooper & Hemingway: The True Gen, narrated by Sam Waterston, Len Cariou as Ernest Hemingway.

== ICONS Radio Hour ==
Zampella served as Producer of a radio podcast show, ICONS Radio Hour, for four years, from 2007 to 2010. He produced interviews with both current Hollywood artists and those with first-hand knowledge of the Classic Hollywood era. Zampella hired author and film historian Meir Z. Ribalow to co-host the podcast with Mulholland.

== Preservation and Conservation ==
Richard Zampella is the owner and operator of Idylease Inn, a former resort hotel and historic landmark in Newfoundland, NJ, built in 1902. He also manages the Idylease Tree Farm and is licensed by the FAA to operate the Idylease Airfield.
