= Oak Ridge, New Jersey =

Populated place in Morris and Passaic counties, New Jersey, US

- Census-designated place
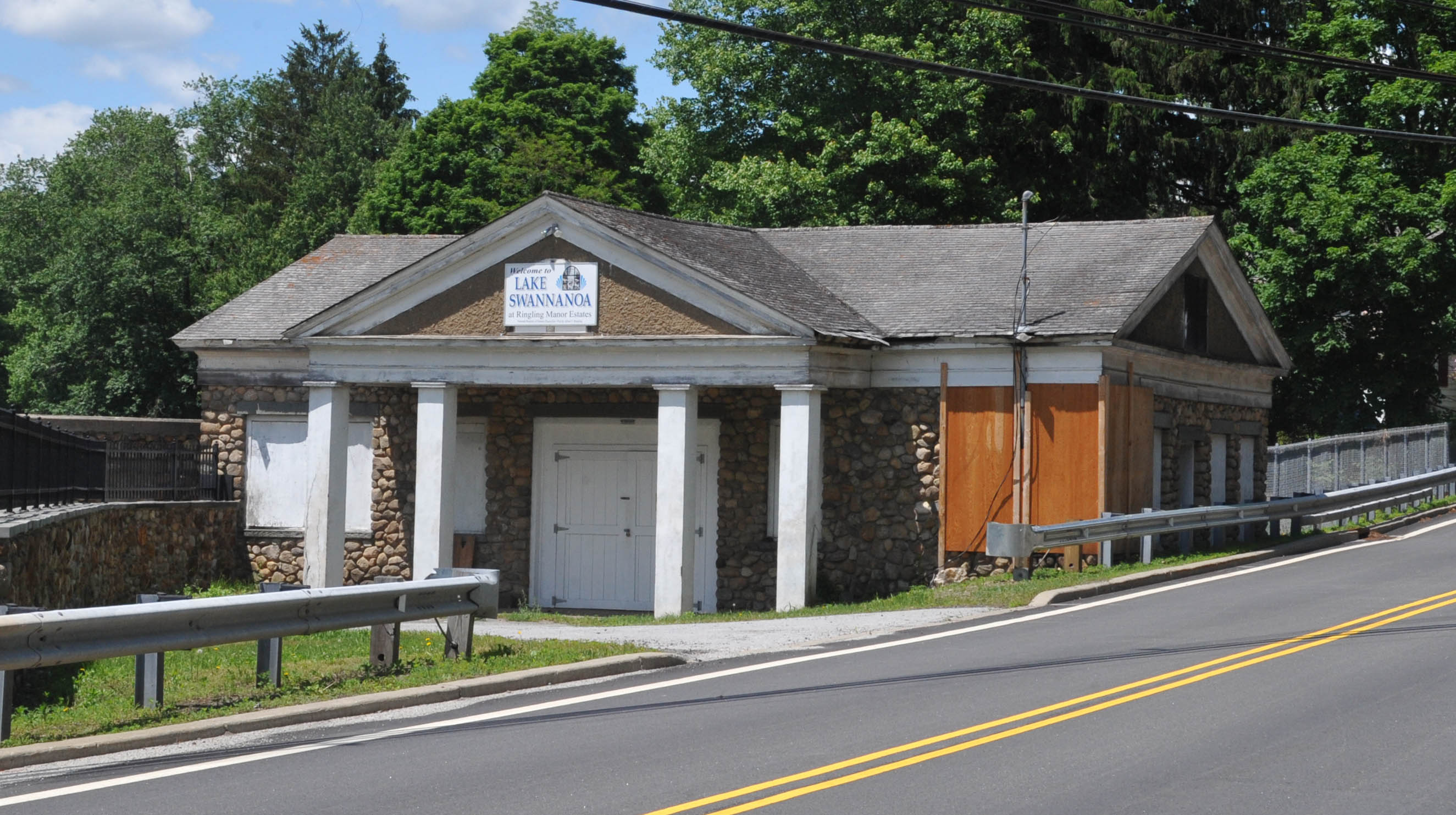
- Lake Swannanoa Clubhouse at Ringling Manor Estates in Jefferson Township

- Location in Morris County Location in Passaic County Location in New Jersey Location in the United States
- Coordinates: 41°02′46″N 74°29′10″W
- Country: United States
- State: New Jersey
- Counties: Morris, Passaic
- Townships: Jefferson, West Milford

Area
  - Total: 14.26 sq mi (36.94 km^{2})
  - Land: 13.31 sq mi (34.48 km^{2})
  - Water: 0.95 sq mi (2.46 km^{2})
- Elevation: 879 ft (268 m)

Population (2020)
  - Total: 10,996
  - Density: 826/sq mi (319/km^{2})
- ZIP Code: 07438
- FIPS code: 34-53910
- GNIS feature ID: 0878910

Oak Ridge is an unincorporated community and census-designated place (CDP) located in West Milford Township in Passaic County and Jefferson Township in Morris County, in the U.S. state of New Jersey. The area is served as United States Postal Service ZIP Code 07438.

As of the 2020 United States census, the population was 10,996.

== Geography ==
The Oak Ridge CDP is located in northern Morris County and western Passaic County and includes several communities, including Oak Ridge proper in Passaic County on the Pequannock River along Route 23 and the New York, Susquehanna & Western Railroad main line. In Morris County, the communities of Milton, Petersburg, and Woodstock are within the Oak Ridge CDP. County Route 699 (Oak Ridge Road) runs south from the junction with Route 23 and is the main north–south local route in the community.

According to the U.S. Census Bureau, the Oak Ridge CDP has a total area of 14.26 square miles (36.9 km^{2}), of which 13.31 square miles (34.5 km^{2}) are land and 0.95 square miles (2.46 km^{2}), or 6.65%, are water. The Pequannock River, forming the Passaic/Morris county line, takes a winding course through the northern part of the CDP, separating Oak Ridge proper from the communities of Milton and Petersburg. The Pequannock is an east-flowing tributary of the Pompton River and part of the Passaic River watershed. Oak Ridge Reservoir on the Pequannock lies on part of the northwest border of the CDP. A low height of land just south of the Pequannock River places the southern part of the CDP within the watershed of the Rockaway River, a south-flowing tributary that also leads to the Passaic. White Rock Lake, Mitt Pond, Moosepac Pond, Cozy Lake, Lake Swannanoa, and Oak Ridge lake are all within the CDP and drained by the Rockaway River.

Green Pond Mountain, rising to over 1,260 feet (380 m) above sea level, forms the southern border of Oak Ridge and the border with Rockaway Township. Bowling Green Mountain, elevation 1,380 feet (420 m), borders the community to the southwest.

== Demographics ==
Historical population
Census	Pop.	Note	%±
2020	10,996		—
U.S. Decennial Census; 2020

Oak Ridge was first listed as a census designated place in the 2020 U.S. census.

=== 2020 census ===
As of the 2020 census, Oak Ridge had a population of 10,996. The median age was 45.7 years. 19.4% of residents were under the age of 18 and 17.2% of residents were 65 years of age or older. For every 100 females there were 102.4 males, and for every 100 females age 18 and over there were 100.3 males age 18 and over.

Oak Ridge CDP, New Jersey – Racial and ethnic composition Note: the US Census treats Hispanic/Latino as an ethnic category. This table excludes Latinos from the racial categories and assigns them to a separate category. Hispanics/Latinos may be of any race.
Race / Ethnicity (NH = Non-Hispanic)	Pop 2020	2020
White alone (NH)	9,428	85.74%
Black or African American alone (NH)	110	1.00%
Native American or Alaska Native alone (NH)	9	0.08%
Asian alone (NH)	165	1.50%
Native Hawaiian or Pacific Islander alone (NH)	4	0.04%
Other race alone (NH)	67	0.61%
Mixed race or Multiracial (NH)	298	2.71%
Hispanic or Latino (any race)	915	8.32%
Total	10,996	100.00%

80.3% of residents lived in urban areas, while 19.7% lived in rural areas.

There were 4,098 households in Oak Ridge, of which 30.2% had children under the age of 18 living in them. Of all households, 61.7% were married-couple households, 15.1% were households with a male householder and no spouse or partner present, and 17.6% were households with a female householder and no spouse or partner present. About 20.7% of all households were made up of individuals and 9.7% had someone living alone who was 65 years of age or older.

There were 4,296 housing units, of which 4.6% were vacant. The homeowner vacancy rate was 1.1% and the rental vacancy rate was 4.1%.

== Climate ==
This climatic region is typified by large seasonal temperature differences, with warm to hot (and often humid) summers and cold (sometimes severely cold) winters. According to the Köppen Climate Classification system, Oak Ridge has a humid continental climate, abbreviated "Dfb" on climate maps.

== Government and infrastructure ==
The postal addresses within the CDP, including the communities within Jefferson Township, read "Oak Ridge, New Jersey".

== Education ==
The respective school districts are Jefferson Township Public Schools for sections in Jefferson Township, Morris County; and West Milford Township Public Schools for sections in West Milford Township, Passaic County.

The respective public high schools are Jefferson Township High School and West Milford High School.

== Notable people ==
People who were born in, residents of, or otherwise closely associated with Oak Ridge include:

- Douglas Yeo (born 1955), bass trombonist
