= Mike Leach (long snapper) =

American football player (born 1976)

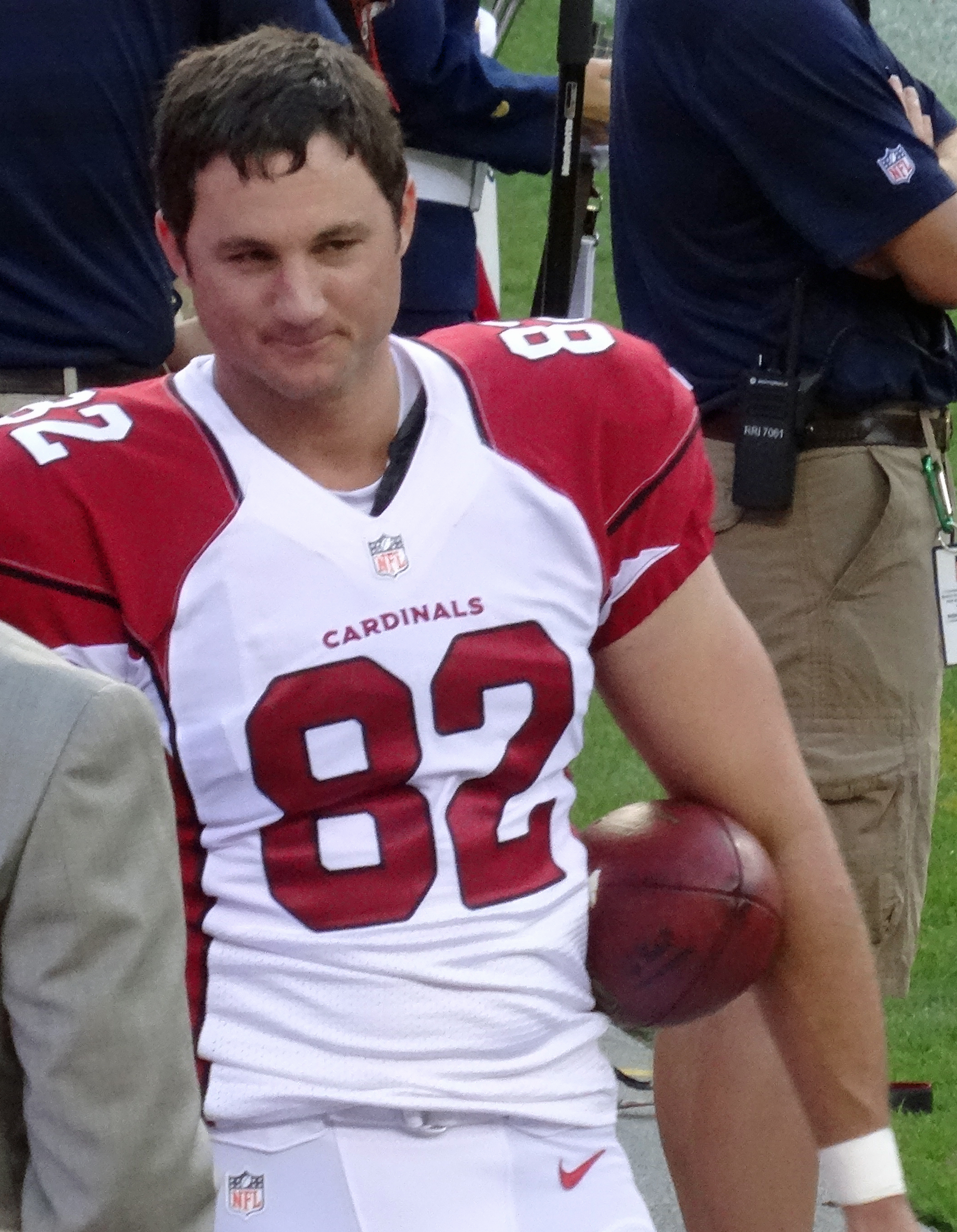
- Leach in the 2013 preseason

No. 83, 48, 82
- Position: Long snapper

Personal information
- Born: October 18, 1976 (age 50); Dover, New Jersey, U.S.
- Listed height: 6 ft 2 in (1.88 m)
- Listed weight: 235 lb (107 kg)

Career information
- High school: Oak Ridge (NJ) Jefferson Twp.
- College: Boston University (1995–1997); William & Mary (1998–1999)
- NFL draft: 2000: undrafted

Career history
- Tennessee Titans (2000–2001); Chicago Bears (2002)*; Denver Broncos (2002–2008); Arizona Cardinals (2009–2015)
- * Offseason or practice squad member only

Awards and highlights
- 2× All-American (1998–1999); 2× All-A-10 (1998–1999)

Career NFL statistics
- Games played: 235
- Total tackles: 56
- Fumble recoveries: 1
- Stats at Pro Football Reference

John Michael Leach (born October 18, 1976) is an American former professional football player who was a long snapper in the National Football League (NFL). He played college football at Boston University and College of William & Mary. He was signed by the Tennessee Titans as an undrafted free agent in 2000. His NFL career sequentially spanned 16 seasons as a member of the Titans, Chicago Bears, Denver Broncos, and Arizona Cardinals.

== Early life ==
Leach attended Jefferson Township High School in Jefferson Township, New Jersey. He lettered in football, baseball and basketball. In football, Leach was a first-team, all-state selection as a punter. By the time Leach had graduated in the mid-1990s, he finished as the all-time leading scorer and rebounder in Falcons basketball history. Additionally, Leach appeared in three NJSIAA basketball playoff games.

== College career ==
Leach attended Boston University (1995–1997) and The College of William & Mary (1998–2000). At The College of William and Mary, during his junior season, his 58 receptions as a tight end were the second-most at the position in school history (to Glenn Bodnar's 69 catches in 1984) and his punting average set a single-season school record of 44.4 yards. The performance earned him Associated Press second-team All-America and second-team All-Atlantic 10 honors that season. He also earned first-team Walter Camp All-American honors at tight end as a senior.

== Professional career ==
=== Tennessee Titans ===
Leach signed as an undrafted free agent with the Tennessee Titans on April 20, 2000. He played in 15 games for the Titans during the 2000 season and four games during the 2001 season before being released by the team.

=== Chicago Bears ===
Leach signed a future contract with the Chicago Bears on January 10, 2002 and attended training camp with the team before being waived on August 26 of that year.

=== Denver Broncos ===
He signed with the Denver Broncos on November 4, 2002, and served as the team's long snapper for the eight remaining games that the Broncos had during the 2002 season. His first game with the Broncos occurred on November 11, 2002, as part of a 34–10 home loss to the Oakland Raiders.

Leach served as the Broncos long snapper in every game through the 2008 season since his first appearance with the team in 2002. He was featured in an August 2007 issue of Sports Illustrated in which writer Peter King listed the top 500 players in the NFL. Leach was ranked number 1,000 as a symbolic gesture to show that every player has a necessary role on a roster.

The Broncos released Leach on March 1, 2009 after the team signed free agent long snapper Lonie Paxton.

=== Arizona Cardinals ===
Leach was signed by the Arizona Cardinals on March 11, 2009, replacing incumbent Nathan Hodel. Leach spent 7 seasons with the Cardinals; totaling 19 solo tackles and 1 fumble recovery.

=== Retirement as an NFL player ===
In January 2016, Leach announced his retirement from the NFL, via Twitter, just days after the Cardinals' loss to the Carolina Panthers in the NFC Championship Game.
