= Russia, New Jersey =

Populated place in Morris County, New Jersey, US

- Unincorporated community
- Location within Morris County, New Jersey Location within New Jersey Location within the United States
- Coordinates: 41°02′26″N 74°31′58″W
- Country: United States
- State: New Jersey
- County: Morris
- Township: Jefferson
- Elevation: 942 ft (287 m)
- Time zone: UTC−05:00 (Eastern (EST))
  - Summer (DST): UTC−04:00 (EDT)
- GNIS feature ID: 879865

Russia (also New Russia) is an unincorporated community within Jefferson Township, in Morris County, in the U.S. state of New Jersey.

The settlement is located on Russia Brook.

A charcoal iron forge was located in Russia in 1775.

Russia Brook Sanctuary, a 369-acre (149 ha) rural park, is located north of Russia.
