= Jefferson Township Public Schools =

School district in Morris County, New Jersey, US

Address
- 28 Bowling Green Parkway; Lake Hopatcong, NJ 07849 United States
- Coordinates: 40.961896°N 74.596896°W

District information
- Grades: PreK-12
- Superintendent: Jeanne Howe
- Business administrator: Rita Oroho-Giacchi
- Schools: 6

Students and staff
- Enrollment: 2,672 (as of 2023–24)
- Faculty: 246.7 FTEs
- Student–teacher ratio: 10.8:1

Other information
- District Factor Group: GH
- Website: www.jefftwp.org
Ind.	Per pupil	District spending	Rank (*)	K-12 average	%± vs. average
1A	Total Spending	$18,371	39	$18,891	−2.8%
1	Budgetary Cost	14,224	43	14,783	−3.8%
2	Classroom Instruction	8,041	31	8,763	−8.2%
6	Support Services	2,478	55	2,392	3.6%
8	Administrative Cost	1,606	48	1,485	8.1%
10	Operations & Maintenance	1,726	43	1,783	−3.2%
13	Extracurricular Activities	274	8	268	2.2%
16	Median Teacher Salary	56,239	10	64,043
Data from NJDoE 2014 Taxpayers' Guide to Education Spending. *Of K-12 districts with 1,800-3,500 students. Lowest spending=1; Highest=68

The Jefferson Township Public Schools is a comprehensive community public school district, serving students in pre-kindergarten through twelfth grade from Jefferson Township, in Morris County, in the U.S. state of New Jersey.

As of the 2023–24 school year, the district, comprised of six schools, had an enrollment of 2,672 students and 246.7 classroom teachers (on an FTE basis), for a student–teacher ratio of 10.8:1.

== History ==
District enrollment, which had peaked at 3,648 in the 2006–07 school year, had dropped to 3,406 by 2012–13 and had reached 2,529 in the 2022–23 school year. Enrollment at the high school reached its highest in 2007–08 with 1,125 students, declining to 1,034 in 2012–13 and 839 in 2023–24.

In the face of declining enrollment and a state school-funding formula that favors districts with rising student populations, the district closed Milton Elementary School in 2021 and Cozy Lake Elementary School after the 2024–25 school year. The district said that the changes to the calculation of aid numbers resulted in a loss $45 million in state funding from 2018 to 2024, a drop of nearly two-thirds of what had been received in 2007–08, heavily influenced by a drop of more than 30% in district enrollment.

The district had been classified by the New Jersey Department of Education as being in District Factor Group "GH", the third-highest of eight groupings. District Factor Groups organize districts statewide to allow comparison by common socioeconomic characteristics of the local districts. From lowest socioeconomic status to highest, the categories are A, B, CD, DE, FG, GH, I and J.

== Schools ==
Schools in the district (with 2023–24 enrollment data from the National Center for Education Statistics) are:

Elementary schools

- Ellen T. Briggs Elementary School with 213 students in grades PreK–K
  - Randi DeBrito, principal
- Cozy Lake Elementary School (which was closed after the 2024–25 school year), had 211 students in grades PreK–K
- Arthur T. Stanlick Elementary School with 396 students in grades 1–5
  - Jessica Brennan, interim principal
- White Rock Elementary School with 479 students in grades 1–5
  - Timothy Plotts, principal

Intermediate school

- Jefferson Township Intermediate School with 563 students in grades 4–8
  - Margaret M. Widgren, principal

High school

- Jefferson Township High School with 791 students in grades 9–12
  - Michael Lonie, principal

== Administration ==
Core members of the district's administration include:

- Jeanne Howe, superintendent of schools
- Rita Oroho-Giacchi, business administrator and board secretary

== Board of education ==
The district's board of education, comprised of nine members, sets policy and oversees the fiscal and educational operation of the district through its administration. As a Type II school district, the board's trustees are elected directly by voters to serve three-year terms of office on a staggered basis, with three seats up for election each year held (since 2012) as part of the November general election. The board appoints a superintendent to oversee the district's day-to-day operations and a business administrator to supervise the business functions of the district.
