= Idylease Inn =

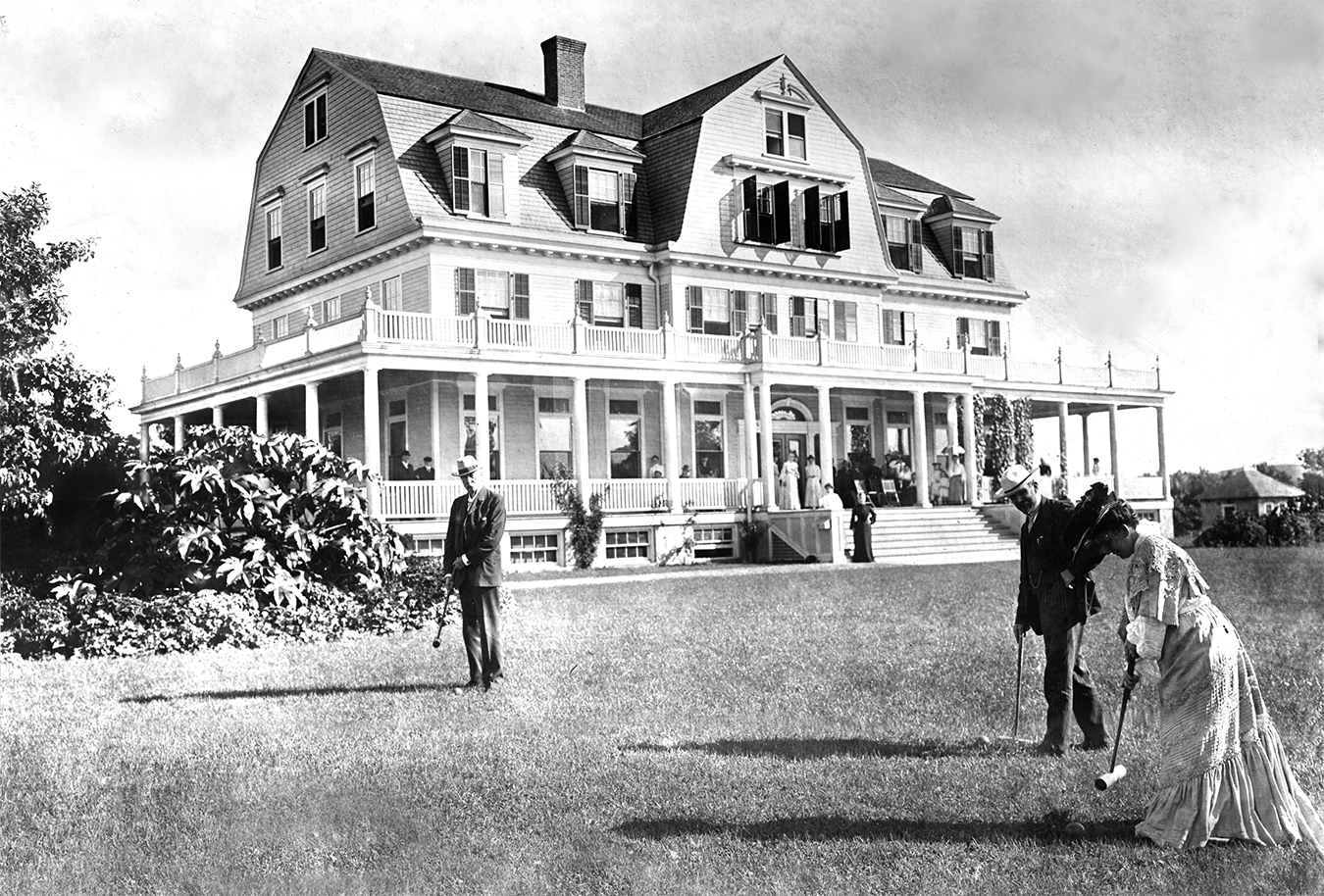

General information
- Year built: 1902

Idylease (/ˈaɪdəl.iːz/ "idle-ease"), a former resort hotel located in Newfoundland, New Jersey, United States, was erected in 1902 and is an architecturally and historically significant example of early 20th century resort architecture in Northwest, New Jersey. The only surviving example of resort facilities in the region, it recalls the popularity of the region as the vacationland for the middle class in the late nineteenth century. The Inn was built for a group of 11 investors calling themselves The Newfoundland Health Association headed by Dr Edgar Day from Brooklyn, New York. Idylease is situated on the summit of an 1,000-foot (300 m)-hill in the foothills of the Ramapo Mountains and is located 30 miles northwest from New York City.

== History ==
Work began on Idylease in summer of 1901 and opened its doors on New Year's Day in 1903. Architecturally, Idylease Inn embodies a variety of distinctive characteristics commonly associated with this type of resort architecture in this region at the turn of the century. On the exterior the most salient features associated with this type are the broad veranda and second story balcony which deteriorated and was removed sometime during the 1930s. Expansive porches and open air-balconies were an essential feature of the resort hotel, providing guests with vistas of the surrounding wilderness and pleasant public spaces for social gatherings. Verandas also served as sanitary and therapeutic retreats from which to enjoy the "healthful and moral atmosphere of nature, reflecting the popularity of resorts not only for pleasure and recreational activity but also for escapes from the crowded, disease ridden and immoral conditions of the suddenly industrialized cities of the northeast."

== The Newfoundland Health Association ==
Dr. Day founded The Newfoundland Village Improvement Society in 1902 which was formed to "protect the interest of the residents and property holders of Newfoundland, New Jersey improve the conditions of the roads, secure better railroad service, and in general do whatever shall tend to increase the beauty and attractiveness of our village and its surroundings." Dr Day remained president of the society until his death at Idylease in 1906. Dr. Daniel Drake who was the resident physician and general manager of Idylease at the time of Dr. Days death became the principal stock holder of the Newfoundland Health Association which owned Idylease. George A. Day, Dr. Drakes brother was appointed assistant manager.

In 1954 a doctor from Jersey City, New Jersey purchased Idylease from the Newfoundland, Health Association. Arthur Zampella, MD purchased Idylease Inn from the estate of Dr. Daniel Drake and converted the Inn into the Idylease Nursing Home. Idylease Nursing Home maintained a staff of 11 doctors and employed 65 people. Idylease Nursing home closed in 1972 and subsequently became a congregate living facility. Dr. Zampella died in January 1992 and is buried in the Newfoundland cemetery. Dr. Daniel Drake, is also interred there as well.

On April 11, 2016 Film Producer Richard Zampella, the son of Dr. Arthur Zampella purchased Idylease.

== Noted guests ==
Thomas Edison was a regular guest of Idylease while working on a magnetic ore extracting device at the Franklin/Odgensberg Mine for the New Jersey Zinc Company . F. Fichter Hoagan, a longtime business manager to previous owner Dr. Daniel Drake often reminisced of the days when “Mr. Edison would stay overnight at Idylease while traveling to the mine. Newfoundland marked the half way point from Edison’s laboratories in East Orange. He would spend the night at Idylease and have his car serviced at the local garage”. Edison was no stranger to the area. He had filmed scenes from The Great Train Robbery (film) in Echo Lake and was known to fish along the banks of the Pequannock River.

Mary Teresa Norton (March 7, 1875 – August 2, 1959) was an American politician. The sixth woman in the United States Congress, she was the first from an Eastern state (New Jersey), and the first non-Republican (she was a Democrat). She went on to serve an unprecedented 13 consecutive terms in the United States House of Representatives, from 1925 to 1951, and chaired four committees. She was a labor advocate and a supporter of women's rights. During the late 1920s Ms.Norton was a regular guest at Idylease.

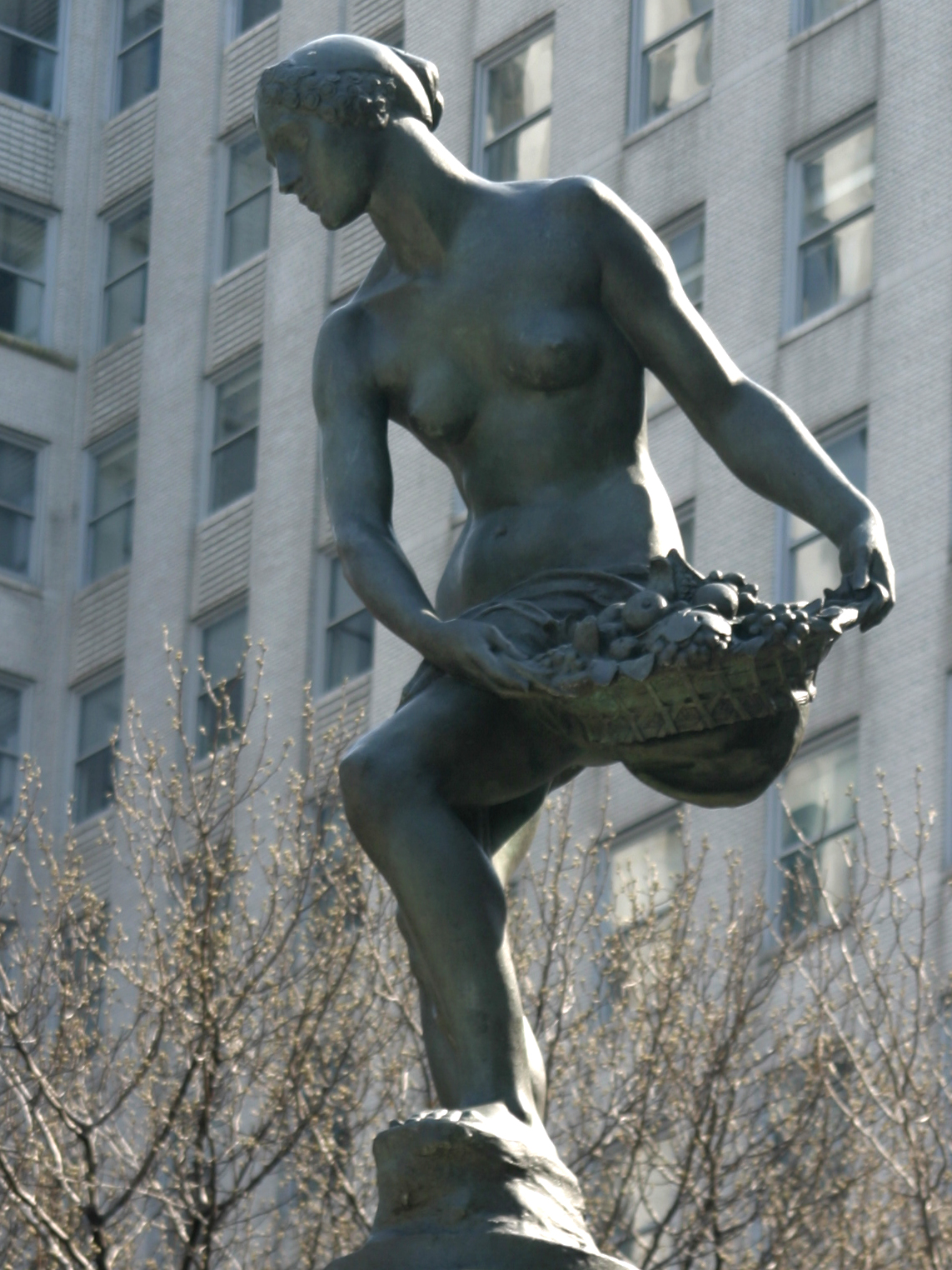
The Plaza Hotel Fountain: Pomona

Priscilla Smith was a five-year resident of Idylease during the latter part of the 1960s. As a young girl, Priscilla was a glamorous model whose fun loving and explosive personality and blazing bohemian beauty befuddled and charmed some of the greatest artists of the postwar world. She spent the final years of her life at Idylease. Priscilla will be best remembered as the favored model of Austrian Artist Karl Bitter, and was the artist's model for the statue atop the Pulitzer Fountain opposite the Plaza Hotel located on southern half of Grand Army Plaza in New York City. Bitter’s bronze sculpture represents Pomona, the Roman goddess of abundance. Smith, the artist’s model was a shy 19-year-old girl from Queens, New York when she was personally chosen by Bitter as the model for Pomona because of her striking features and reserved demeanor.

Although familiar with virtually all games in the realm of sports, William B. Hanna (1862–1930) specialized in sports writing in baseball and football. He was brought up in Kansas City and began his newspaper career with the Kansas "Star" but came to New York in 1888, joining the staff of the New York, "Herald." He is widely considered one of the most noted sports writers of the period.

His style was noted for his eschewing of slang such as "swat, pill, horsehide", etc. His choice of words were those less chosen, terse, precise, kind. His style was succinct, his knowledge encyclopedic. He always signed his copy, William B. Hanna, and became upset if anyone changed it.

== Miscellaneous ==
- Battershell—Lavender Moses Video filmed at Idylease for MTV.
- The State—Lincoln Logs filmed at Idylease for MTV.
- The Station Agent filmed in Newfoundland, New Jersey.
- William B Hanna sports writer for The New York Herald Tribune. Resident at Idylease 1930.
- King of The Gypsies filmed in Newfoundland, New Jersey in 1978.
