= Lower Berkshire Valley, New Jersey =

Populated place in Morris County, New Jersey, US

- Census-designated place
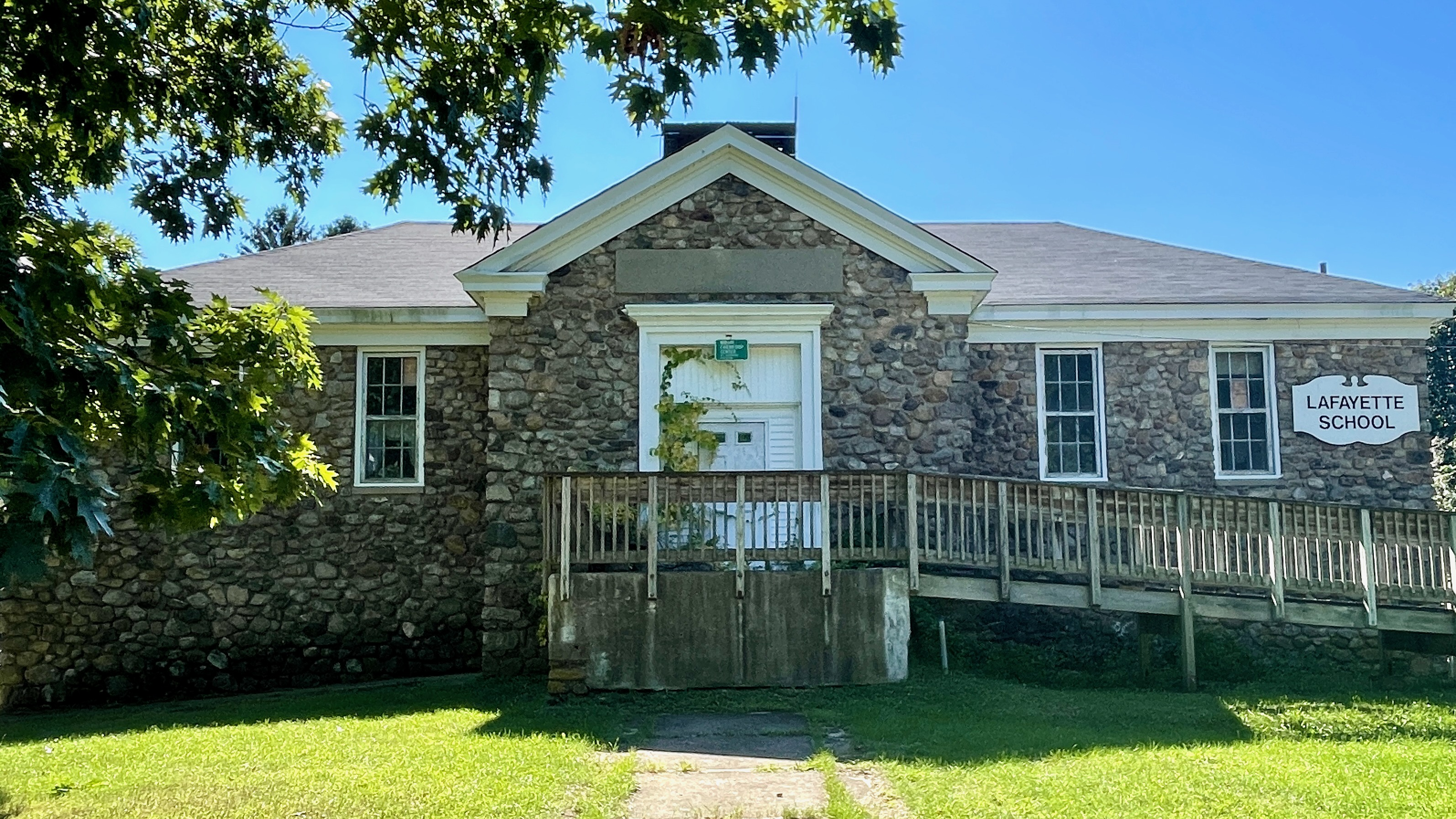
- Lafayette School, listed on the NRHP

- Location in Morris County Location in New Jersey Location in the United States
- Coordinates: 40°54′49″N 74°36′35″W
- Country: United States
- State: New Jersey
- County: Morris
- Townships: Roxbury; Jefferson

Area
  - Total: 1.03 sq mi (2.67 km^{2})
  - Land: 1.01 sq mi (2.61 km^{2})
  - Water: 0.023 sq mi (0.06 km^{2})
- Elevation: 702 ft (214 m)

Population (2020)
  - Total: 617
  - Density: 611.6/sq mi (236.15/km^{2})
- Time zone: UTC−05:00 (Eastern (EST))
  - Summer (DST): UTC−04:00 (EDT)
- ZIP Code: 07885 (Wharton)
- Area codes: 973/862
- FIPS code: 34-41700
- GNIS feature ID: 2813401

Lower Berkshire Valley is a census-designated place (CDP) in Roxbury and Jefferson townships, Morris County, New Jersey, in the United States. As of the 2020 census, it had a population of 617.

== Geography ==
The community is in western Morris County, primarily in the northeast part of Roxbury Township, along Berkshire Valley Road. The northernmost part of the CDP is in southern Jefferson Township. Interstate 80 passes through the southern part of the CDP, but with no direct access. The community is 2 miles (3 km) northwest of Wharton and 4 miles (6 km) northwest of Dover.

According to the U.S. Census Bureau, the Lower Berkshire Valley CDP has a total area of 1.03 square miles (2.67 km^{2}), of which 0.02 square miles (0.05 km^{2}), or 2.23%, are water. The area is drained by the Rockaway River, which passes just east of the CDP boundary and flows east to the Passaic River at the Essex County border.

== Demographics ==
Historical population
Census	Pop.	Note	%±
2020	617		—
U.S. Decennial Census 2020

Lower Berkshire Valley was first listed as a census designated place in the 2020 U.S. census.

Lower Berkshire Valley CDP, New Jersey – Racial and ethnic composition Note: the US Census treats Hispanic/Latino as an ethnic category. This table excludes Latinos from the racial categories and assigns them to a separate category. Hispanics/Latinos may be of any race.
Race / Ethnicity (NH = Non-Hispanic)	Pop 2020	2020
White alone (NH)	508	82.33%
Black or African American alone (NH)	15	2.43%
Native American or Alaska Native alone (NH)	1	0.16%
Asian alone (NH)	10	1.62%
Native Hawaiian or Pacific Islander alone (NH)	0	0.00%
Other race alone (NH)	2	0.32%
Mixed race or Multiracial (NH)	15	2.43%
Hispanic or Latino (any race)	66	10.70%
Total	617	100.00%
