= Lake Hopatcong, New Jersey =

Populated place in Morris County, New Jersey, US

- Census-designated place
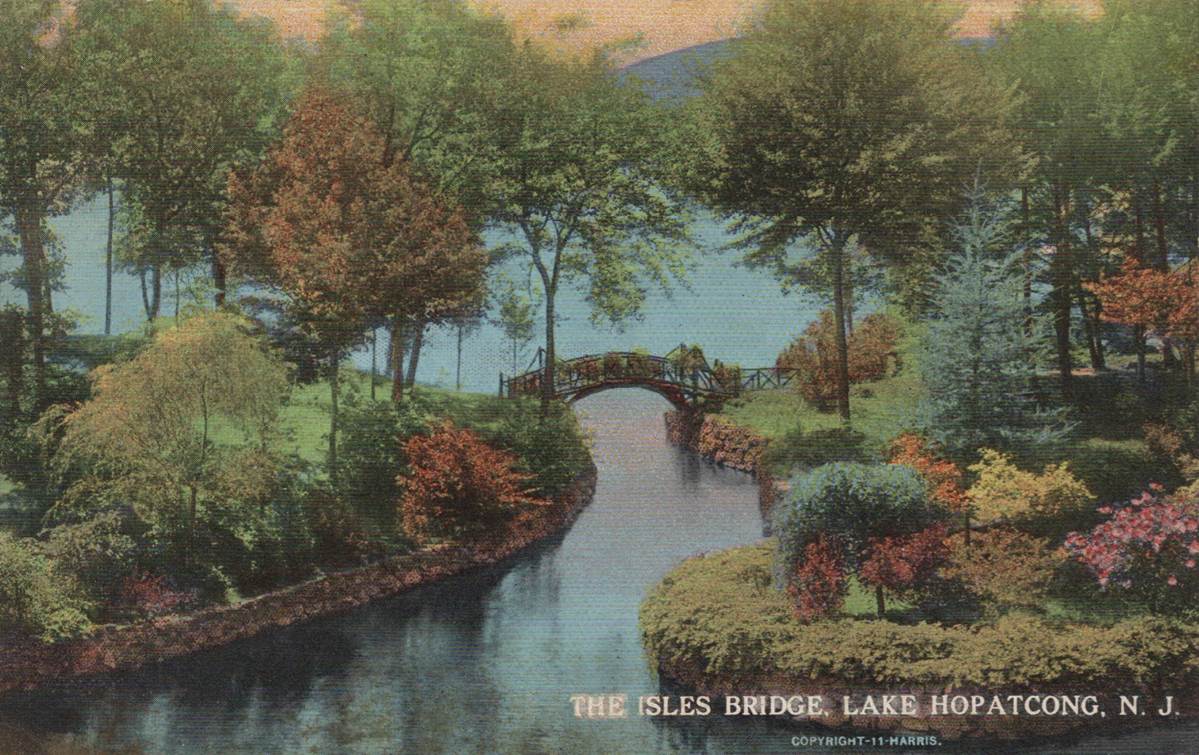
- The Isles Bridge, Lake Hopatcong, New Jersey (1911)

- Location in Morris County Location in New Jersey Location in the United States
- Coordinates: 40°57′39″N 74°36′46″W
- Country: United States
- State: New Jersey
- County: Morris
- Township: Jefferson

Area
  - Total: 9.39 sq mi (24.32 km^{2})
  - Land: 7.39 sq mi (19.13 km^{2})
  - Water: 2.00 sq mi (5.19 km^{2})
- Elevation: 930 ft (280 m)

Population (2020)
  - Total: 10,232
  - Density: 1,385/sq mi (534.9/km^{2})
- Time zone: UTC−05:00 (Eastern (EST))
  - Summer (DST): UTC−04:00 (EDT)
- ZIP Codes: 07849 (Lake Hopatcong); 07885 (Wharton)
- Area codes: 973/862
- FIPS code: 34-37710
- GNIS feature ID: 2806109

Lake Hopatcong is a census-designated place (CDP) in Jefferson Township, in Morris County, in the U.S. state of New Jersey. It includes communities on the northeast side of Lake Hopatcong, the largest freshwater body in the state. As of the 2020 United States census, the population was 10,232.

== Geography ==
The Lake Hopatcong CDP occupies the southwest end of Jefferson Township in western Morris County. It is bordered to the west by the borough of Hopatcong and to the north by Sparta, both in Sussex County. It is partially bordered to the south by the borough of Mount Arlington and slightly by the Lower Berkshire Valley CDP.

Lake Hopatcong, the water body, occupies part of the western boundary of the CDP, while the northernmost arm of the lake is entirely within the CDP. Lakefront communities in the CDP include Espanong, Prospect Point, Raccoon Island, Halsey Island, Woodport, and Brady Cove. Inland communities in the CDP include Hurdtown, Tierneys Corner, and Berkshire Valley. Lake Shawnee is in the northeast part of the CDP.

New Jersey Route 15 passes through the eastern side of the CDP, leading south 4 miles (6 km) to Interstate 80 in Wharton and north 6 miles (10 km) to Sparta.

Liffy Island (sometimes spelled as "Lify") is located within the CDP and has many walking trails and great views. The island was formed after the creation of the Morris Canal that raised the water by 12 to 14 feet (3.7 to 4.3 m), thus detaching it from the mainland. In the 19th century, the island and surrounding lands were purchased by the Brady Brothers. They sold some of the island's trees as lumber but otherwise left it in its natural state. About 77 acres (31 ha) of the island was bought by Richmond Boy Scout Council Executive Major Walter S. Stewart and Charles McAteer in 1922. They named it "Scout Island" and used it for the Boy Scouts program until 1982. The camp's cook, William "Pete" Peterson, was given lifetime rights to use the island. In the 1970s, William's heath declined which kept him from visiting the island which left it unattended for years. In the 1990s, Jefferson Township, in which Lake Hopatcong CDP is located, bought the island and established it as the Liffy Island Wildlife Preserve. There is a path from Prospect Park and the Prospect Point Road Trailhead that leads to the island. At the highest point is a firepit and sitting area.

According to the United States Census Bureau, the Lake Hopatcong CDP had a total area of 9.39 square miles (24.32 km^{2}), of which 7.39 square miles (19.14 km^{2}) were land and 2.00 square miles (5.18 km^{2}) (21.34%) were water. The lake, with an outlet 2 miles (3 km) to the southwest into the Musconetcong River, is part of the Delaware River watershed.

== Demographics ==
Historical population
Census	Pop.	Note	%±
1960	1,107		—
1970	1,941		75.3%
2020	10,232		—
U.S. Decennial Census; 1950 1960 1970; 1980 1990 2000; 2010 2020

The community first appeared as an unincorporated community under the name Esponong in the 1960 U.S. census and 1970 U.S. census. It did not appear in subsequent censuses until it was listed as a census designated place under the name Lake Hopatcong in the 2020 United States census.

=== 2020 census ===
As of the 2020 census, Lake Hopatcong had a population of 10,232. The median age was 44.4 years. 19.2% of residents were under the age of 18 and 16.1% of residents were 65 years of age or older. For every 100 females there were 101.9 males, and for every 100 females age 18 and over there were 100.0 males age 18 and over.

96.2% of residents lived in urban areas, while 3.8% lived in rural areas.

Lake Hopatcong CDP, New Jersey – Racial and ethnic composition Note: the US Census treats Hispanic/Latino as an ethnic category. This table excludes Latinos from the racial categories and assigns them to a separate category. Hispanics/Latinos may be of any race.
Race / Ethnicity (NH = Non-Hispanic)	Pop 2020	2020
White alone (NH)	7,813	76.36%
Black or African American alone (NH)	241	2.36%
Native American or Alaska Native alone (NH)	13	0.13%
Asian alone (NH)	694	6.78%
Native Hawaiian or Pacific Islander alone (NH)	2	0.02%
Other race alone (NH)	61	0.60%
Mixed race or Multiracial (NH)	272	2.66%
Hispanic or Latino (any race)	1,136	11.10%
Total	10,232	100.00%

There were 3,983 households in Lake Hopatcong, of which 28.9% had children under the age of 18 living in them. Of all households, 55.1% were married-couple households, 18.4% were households with a male householder and no spouse or partner present, and 19.5% were households with a female householder and no spouse or partner present. About 23.6% of all households were made up of individuals and 8.8% had someone living alone who was 65 years of age or older.

There were 4,466 housing units, of which 10.8% were vacant. The homeowner vacancy rate was 1.7% and the rental vacancy rate was 4.7%.

== Notable people ==
People who were born in, residents of, or otherwise closely associated with Lake Hopatcong include:

- Tim Jacobus (born 1959), artist best known for illustrating the covers for nearly one hundred books in R. L. Stine's Goosebumps series
- Jaren Sina (born 1994), professional basketball player, who played for Astoria Bydgoszcz of the Polish Basketball League
