= Newfoundland, New Jersey =

Populated place in Morris and Passaic counties, New Jersey, US

- Census-designated place
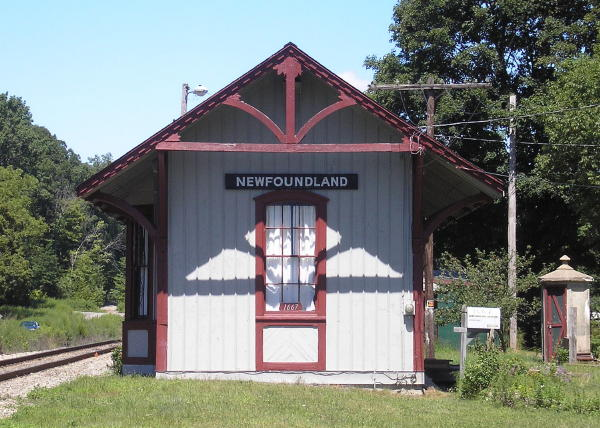
- The Newfoundland Train Station was used in the filming of The Station Agent in 2003. 41°02′55″N 74°26′40″W

- Location in Passaic County Location in Morris County Location in New Jersey Location in the United States
- Coordinates: 41°02′47″N 74°26′07″W
- Country: United States
- State: New Jersey
- County: Passaic and Morris
- Township: West Milford and Jefferson

Area
  - Total: 7.01 sq mi (18.16 km^{2})
  - Land: 6.52 sq mi (16.89 km^{2})
  - Water: 0.49 sq mi (1.27 km^{2})
- Elevation: 761 ft (232 m)

Population (2020)
  - Total: 1,145
  - Density: 175.6/sq mi (67.8/km^{2})
- ZIP Code: 07435
- Area code: 973
- FIPS code: 34-51420
- GNIS feature ID: 0878781

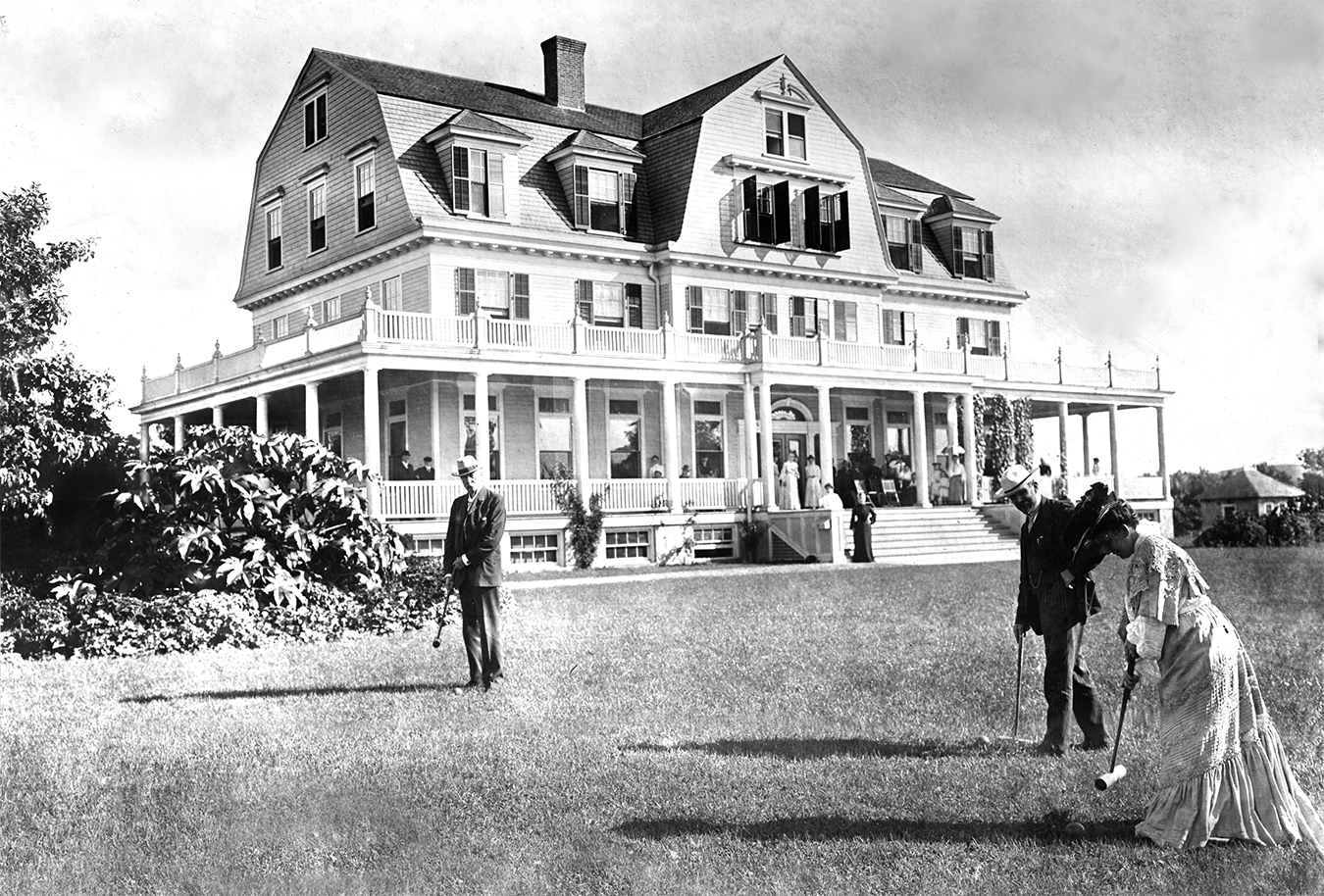
Idylease Inn, a Historic Landmark, is located in Newfoundland.

Newfoundland (/njuːˈfaʊndlənd/) is an unincorporated community and census-designated place (CDP) covering portions of both West Milford in Passaic County, and Jefferson Township in Morris County, in the U.S. state of New Jersey. It is located along Route 23 and is the mailing address of Green Pond, a private lake in Rockaway Township. As of the 2020 United States census, the CDP's population was 1,145.

Newfoundland was a popular resort destination at the turn of the 20th century. Several resort hotels including Brown's Hotel and Idylease Inn relied on the railroad to bring guests for the resort season. The New Jersey Midland Railway developed the Newfoundland station in 1872. New York, Susquehanna and Western Railway provided passenger service until the 20th century and still travels through the area carrying freight. The 2003 independent film The Station Agent was set and filmed largely in Newfoundland, with the train station featured in the film.

Newfoundland is also the home of a nationwide food waste program called AmpleHarvest.org, which was launched in 2009 to end hunger and food waste by helping millions of gardeners nationwide donate excess food to thousands of local food pantries. The program came out of a local program that started donating food from its community garden to food pantries in Newfoundland and other nearby areas.

== Demographics ==
Historical population
Census	Pop.	Note	%±
2020	1,145		—
U.S. Decennial Census; 2020

Newfoundland was first listed as a census designated place in the 2020 U.S. census.

Newfoundland CDP, New Jersey – Racial and ethnic composition Note: the US Census treats Hispanic/Latino as an ethnic category. This table excludes Latinos from the racial categories and assigns them to a separate category. Hispanics/Latinos may be of any race.
Race / Ethnicity (NH = Non-Hispanic)	Pop 2020	2020
White alone (NH)	966	84.37%
Black or African American alone (NH)	7	0.61%
Native American or Alaska Native alone (NH)	7	0.61%
Asian alone (NH)	11	0.96%
Native Hawaiian or Pacific Islander alone (NH)	0	0.00%
Other race alone (NH)	7	0.61%
Mixed race or Multiracial (NH)	40	3.49%
Hispanic or Latino (any race)	107	9.34%
Total	1,145	100.00%

As of 2020, the population was 1,145.
