= Mount Arlington station =

NJ Transit rail station

Mt. Arlington
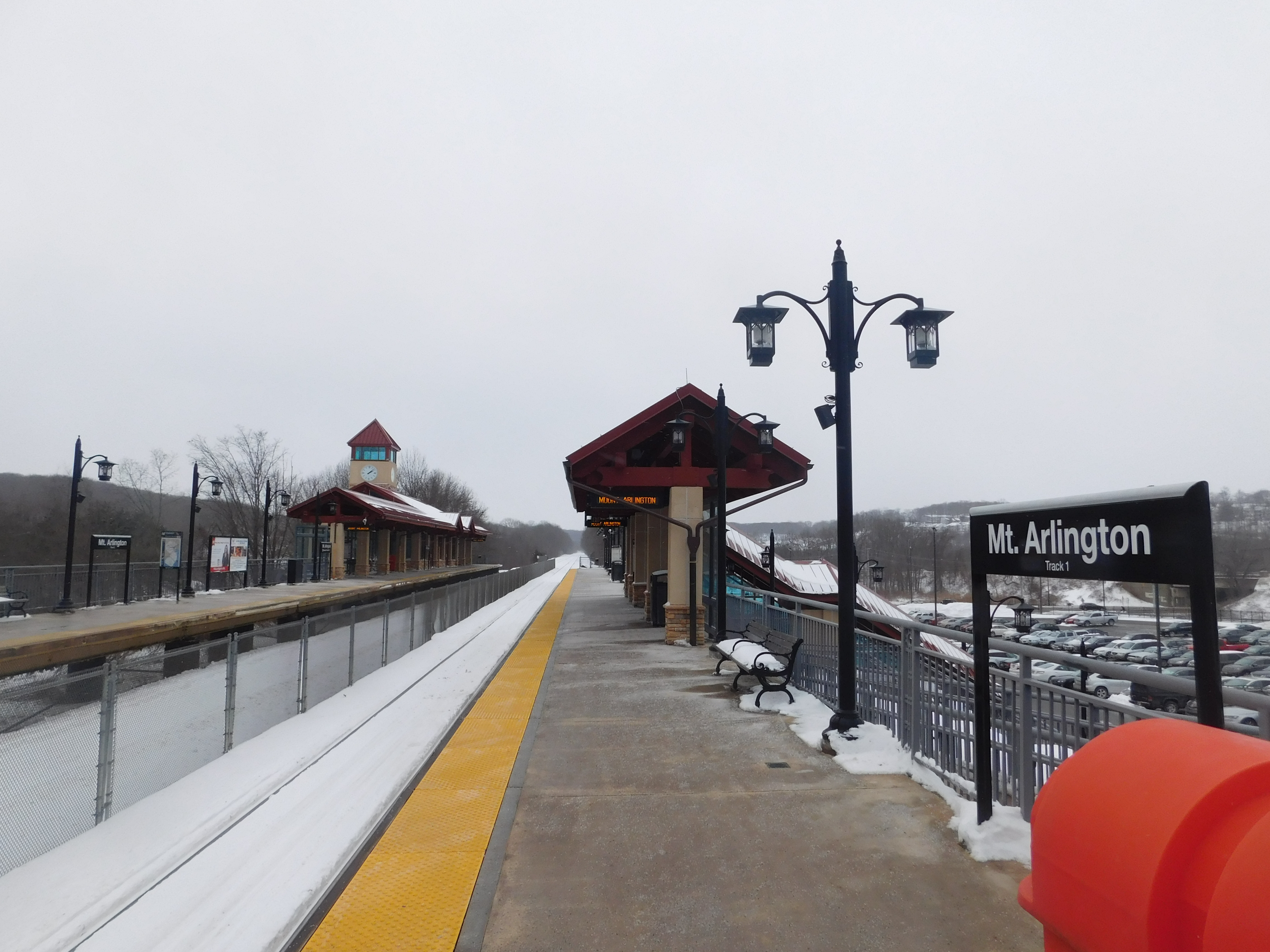
- Mount Arlington station in March 2017.

General information
- Location: Howard Boulevard (CR 615) at Interstate 80, Mount Arlington, New Jersey
- Coordinates: 40.8967°N 74.6328°W
- Platforms: 2 side platforms
- Tracks: 2
- Connections: Lakeland: 46, 80

Construction
- Parking: Yes
- Accessible: yes

Other information
- Fare zone: 19

History
- Opened: January 16, 1854 (first time); January 21, 2008 (second time)
- Closed: November 8, 1942
- Former names: Drakesville (January 16, 1854–July 1, 1891)

Passengers
- 2025: 61 (average weekday)
- Rank: 134 of 153

Services
Preceding station	NJ Transit	Following station
Lake Hopatcong toward Hackettstown	Montclair–Boonton Line limited service	Dover toward New York or Hoboken
Lake Hopatcong toward Hackettstown	Morristown Line limited service	Dover toward New York or Hoboken
Former services
Preceding station	Delaware, Lackawanna and Western Railroad	Following station
Lake Hopatcong toward Buffalo	Main Line	Dover toward Hoboken
Lake Hopatcong toward Buffalo	Main Line	Wharton toward Hoboken
Location

Mount Arlington (also known as the Howard Boulevard Park and Ride) is a commuter railroad station for New Jersey Transit. Located in the borough of Mount Arlington, Morris County, New Jersey, United States, the station is located next to interchange 30 on Interstate 80. The station serves as a park-and-ride for commuters to catch trains for Hoboken Terminal and New York Penn Station. Trains use the Montclair–Boonton Line and Morristown Line to serve locales between Hackettstown and the eastern terminals. Lakeland Bus Lines also services Mount Arlington station. The station is handicapped accessible as part of the Americans with Disabilities Act of 1990. The station features two side platforms and two tracks with elevators.

Railroad history in Mount Arlington began on January 16, 1854, with an extension of the Morris and Essex Railroad from Dover to Hackettstown. The station was established 0.5 miles (0.80 km) west of the current station under the name of Drakesville. The station was renamed on July 1, 1891 from Drakesville to Mount Arlington. A new station was opened later that year. Passenger service ended at Mount Arlington on November 8, 1942 and service was merged with nearby Lake Hopatcong station in Landing.

The current station at Mount Arlington began construction on June 12, 2006 with a groundbreaking ceremony headlined by Rodney P. Frelinghuysen (R–NJ). This new station would join a park and ride already built for buses at Howard Boulevard (Morris County Route 615). Despite a slated 2007 opening, the station opened to the public on January 21, 2008.

== History ==
=== Lackawanna station ===
Mount Arlington was the site of a former Delaware, Lackawanna and Western Railroad station, that replaced the old Drakesville station in modern-day Ledgewood that opened on January 16, 1854. That station burned on February 19, 1867. The railroad closed Drakesville station in 1891 when they built the new station at Mount Arlington, 0.5 miles (0.80 km) to the east. New ownership took the abandoned Drakesville station and converted it into a residence. Mount Arlington station consisted of a 20-by-74-foot (6.1 m × 22.6 m) passenger station, a 15-by-40-foot (4.6 m × 12.2 m) freight station and a bunk house. There was also contained a 386-foot (118 m) long siding.

The Mount Arlington station itself closed on November 8, 1942.

=== NJ Transit station ===
NJ Transit looked at building a new train station in Mount Arlington as early as the autumn of 1997. After dismissing it, the proposal returned in February 1998, with officials from NJ Transit stating they were designing a new train station and park and ride at the Howard Boulevard interchange on Interstate 80. The station would be an approach to reducing traffic ad congestion on Interstate 80. After receiving federal funding through the Transportation Efficiency Act in May 1998, the state began full design work in October 1998. The New Jersey Department of Transportation proposed a $4.5 million station, included with two park and ride lots. One lot would cost $1.5 million and contain 250 lots. The second lot, with no official cost, would add 500 parking spots and located near the future train platform. Speculation was that construction of the new station platform could begin in the Spring of 2001.

By July 2001, congestion on Interstate 80 became worse, even after a widening project. NJ Transit stated that the new station would could cost $7 million or more while the smaller lot cost $2.3 million. NJ Transit speculated that the park and ride could begin construction later in 2001 and be finished by 2002. The new train station would begin construction in 2003. Construction of the park and ride lot began in September 2001 under the work of Tilcon Inc., a general contractor with a December completion date. However, the work would be delayed due to the drainage system requiring approvals. Work on the drainage system was underway by February 2002 and the new speculation is the 235-space, 3-acre (1.2 ha) lot would be opened by April 1. State officials held an unveiling ceremony of the Howard Boulevard Park and Ride on June 25, 2002. The new park and ride would begin having service from the Lakeland Bus Lines when it opened on July 1 with 35 buses from Mount Arlington to places in Manhattan, including Port Authority Bus Terminal. The officials noted that construction of the train station would begin in 2004 at an estimated $8 million.

A bill passed in the United States Senate helped give $11 million to Morris County, of which $2.2 million would be assigned to the new station at Mount Arlington. The state hoped the rest of the funding would come in the next session. NJ Transit announced on December 8, 2004 that construction would begin at the park and ride of the new train station. The $7 million project would be entirely funded by the federal government with money obtained by United States Representative Rodney P. Frelinghuysen. The construction would expand the parking lot to 305 spaces and be open during 2007. There was local speculation that the station's construction would result in the closure of the Lake Hopatcong station in Roxbury Township. However, NJ Transit confirmed that the Lake Hopatcong station would not be closed.

NJ Transit's Board of Directors approved a new $12.1 million project on April 12, 2006. NJ Transit, state, federal and local officials held a groundbreaking for the new station on June 12, 2006. The new Mount Arlington station would be made of artificial stone with a clock tower and have pictures of local history, including the Morris Canal, Bertrand Island Amusement Park and Lake Hopatcong. However, the new parking lot expansion would only go to 285 spaces rather than 307. Construction would begin on June 19 with a speculated completion in November 2007. Each platform would be 285 feet (87 m) long.

Crews installed the new under-track tunnel by the end of December 2006. In October 2007, the station had its clock tower, lighting and railings added. Illumination of the station soon followed. By November, the station would be 95 percent complete. On December 19, 2007, NJ Transit announced that they would open the new station at Mount Arlington on January 21, 2008. The Mayor of Mount Arlington, Art Ondish, stated that an opening ceremony would occur on January 20 and stated that NJ Transit would call it "Mount Arlington station" instead of a previous proposed name of "Route 80/Howard Boulevard Intermodal Terminal".

Over 300 people attending the opening ceremony on January 20, 2008, resulting in the entire lot being filled and several people needing to use a shuttle bus from a local hotel lot. Frelinghuysen, Ondish and other officials attended the ceremony. Ondish added that the borough of Mount Arlington was considering a new local jitney service to help people get to the station.

== Station layout ==
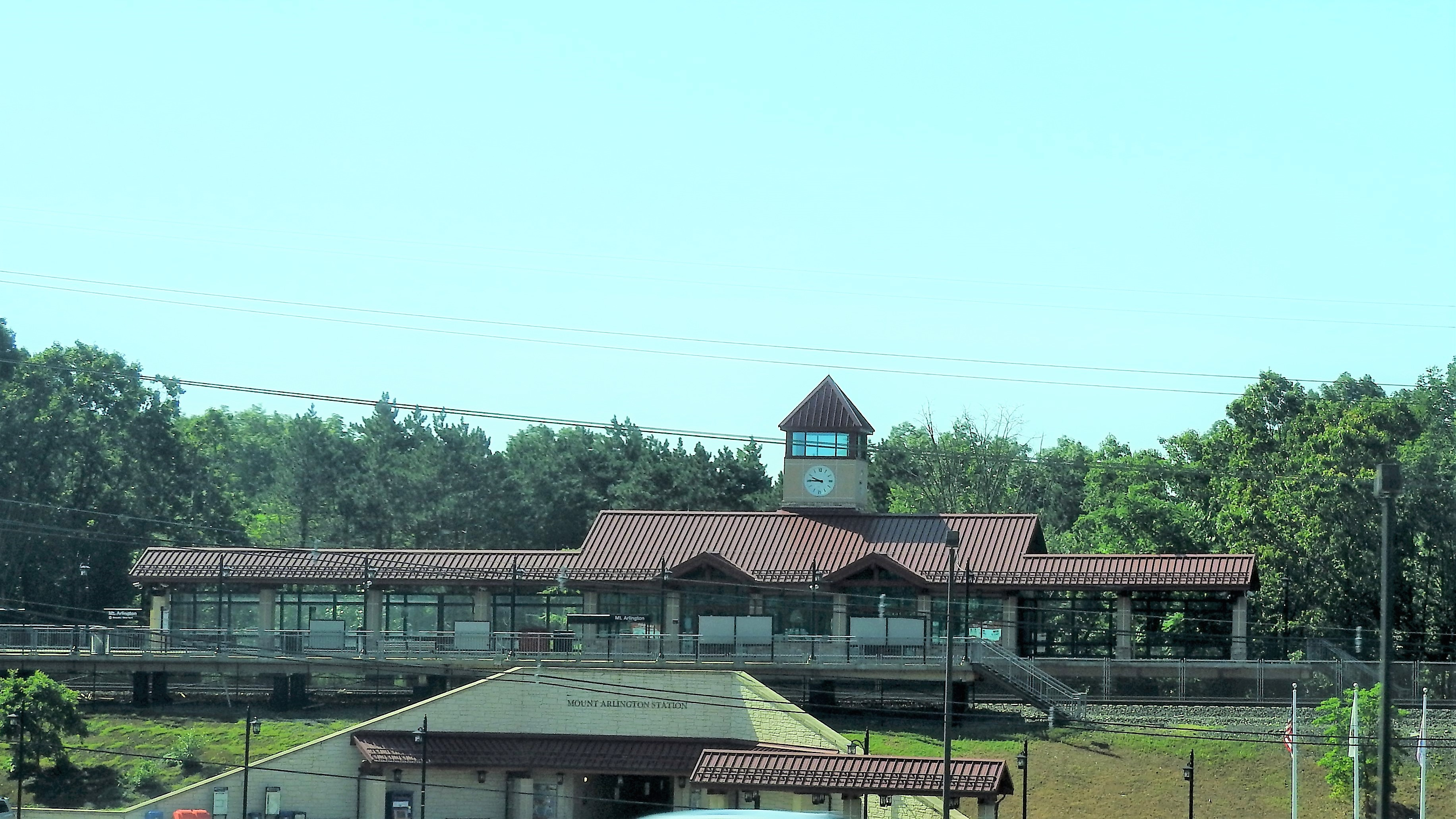
Mount Arlington station in July 2019

Located at Howard Boulevard (County Route 615) and Interstate 80 exit 30, Mount Arlington station contains two high-level side platforms, connected by an under track plaza. The station's plaza contains the single ticket vending machine. Elevators are available to reach the platform. Mount Arlington station has a single parking lot off Howard Boulevard, maintained by NJ Transit for free, containing 281 spaces, seven of which are accessible to handicapped people. The station also provides access to Lakeland Bus Lines's 46 and 80 routes.

Mount Arlington station only contains weekday service, with no service operated on the weekends except during holidays.

== Bibliography ==
- New Jersey Comptroller of the Treasury (1856). Annual Statements of the Railroad and Canal Companies of the State of New Jersey. Trenton, New Jersey: Office of "True American".
- New Jersey State Legislature (1913). Documents of the One Hundred and Thirty-Seventh Legislature of the State of New Jersey and the Sixty-Ninth Under the New Constitution Vol. II Documents 5 to 16 Inclusive. Trenton, New Jersey: State Gazette Publishing Company.
- Taber, Thomas Townsend; Taber, Thomas Townsend III (1981). The Delaware, Lackawanna & Western Railroad in the Twentieth Century. Vol. 2. Muncy, PA: Privately printed. ISBN 0-9603398-3-3.
