= Mountain Pond =

Mountain Pond may refer to:

- Mountain Pond (Old Forge, New York)
- Lake Rogerene, in Mount Arlington, New Jersey, originally named Mountain Pond
