= Lake Hopatcong station =

NJ Transit railway station

Lake Hopatcong
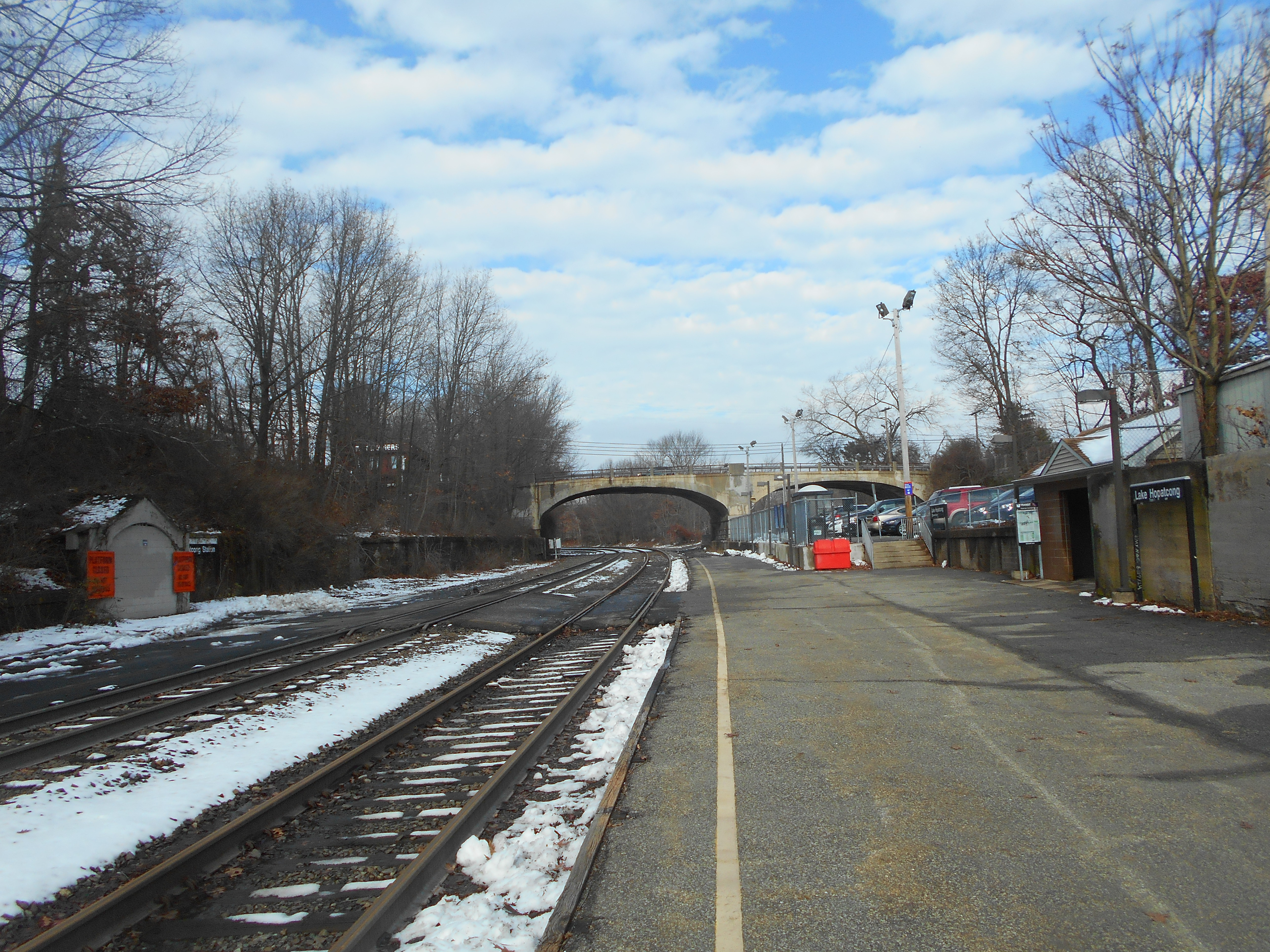
- Lake Hopatcong station in December 2014, looking west toward Bridge 44.53.

General information
- Location: Landing Road; Landing, New Jersey 07849
- Coordinates: 40°54′15″N 74°39′56″W
- Owner: NJ Transit
- Platforms: 2 low-level side platforms
- Tracks: 2
- Connections: Lakeland: 80

Construction
- Parking: 96 spaces

Other information
- Station code: 46 (Delaware, Lackawanna and Western)
- Fare zone: 19

History
- Opened: 1882
- Rebuilt: 1911
- Former names: Hopatcong

Key dates
- May 1982: Station overpass razed

Passengers
- 2025: 29 (average weekday)
- Rank: 148 of 153

Services
Preceding station	NJ Transit	Following station
Netcong toward Hackettstown	Montclair–Boonton Line limited service	Mount Arlington toward New York or Hoboken
Netcong toward Hackettstown	Morristown Line limited service	Mount Arlington toward New York or Hoboken
Former services
Preceding station	Delaware, Lackawanna and Western Railroad	Following station
Greendell toward Buffalo	Main Line	Mount Arlington toward Hoboken
Port Morris toward Portland or Phillipsburg	Old Main Line	Terminus
Future services
Preceding station	NJ Transit	Following station
Andover Terminus	Lackawanna Cut-Off	Mount Arlington toward New York or Hoboken
- Lake Hopatcong Train Station
- U.S. Historic district – Contributing property
- New Jersey Register of Historic Places
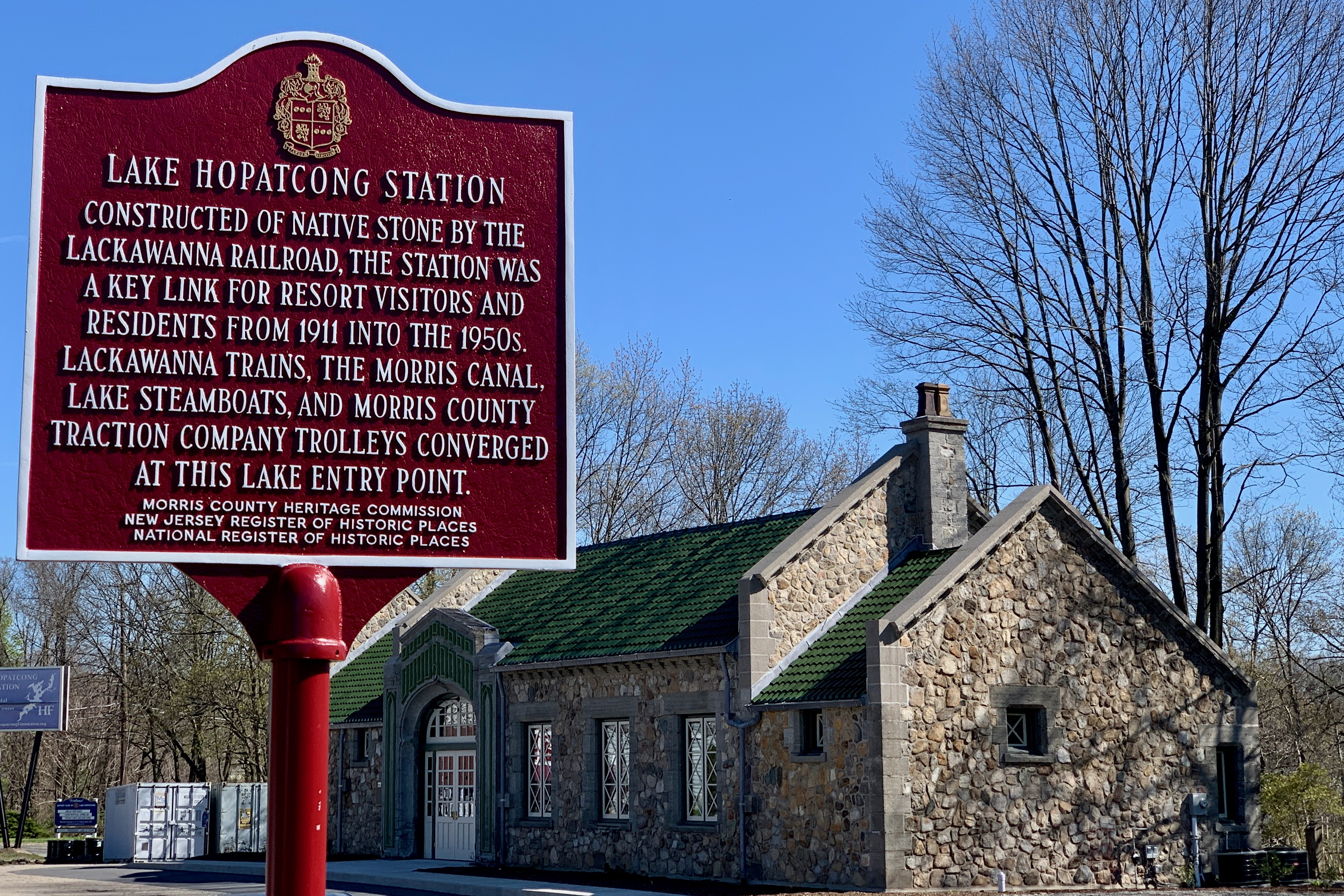
- Lake Hopatcong station in 2020
- Location: 125 Ledgewood-Landing Road; Roxbury, New Jersey
- Coordinates: 40°54′14″N 74°39′58″W
- Built: 1911
- Architect: William Hull Botsford, Frank J. Nies, and V. D. Steinbach
- Architectural style: Late 19th & 20th Century Revivals, Tudor Revival
- Part of: Morris Canal Historic District (ID16000177)
- NJRHP No.: 2251; 5503

Significant dates
- Added to NRHP: April 19, 2016
- Designated NJRHP: June 23, 2015; February 18, 2016
Location

Lake Hopatcong is a New Jersey Transit (NJT) commuter rail station in the Landing section of Roxbury Township, Morris County, New Jersey. It is served by limited trains on the Montclair-Boonton Line and Morristown Line, with service toward Hackettstown, Hoboken Terminal, and New York Penn Station. The station is located below Landing Road, near Lake Hopatcong and the Landing Masonry Bridge.

Rail service through Landing began in 1854, when the Morris & Essex Railroad extended its line westward. A station at Lake Hopatcong was not established until 1882, after the lake had begun to develop as a summer resort. The station became a transfer point between railroad passengers, lake steamboats, and later trolley service. The Delaware, Lackawanna & Western Railroad rebuilt the station in 1911 during improvements associated with the Lackawanna Cut-Off, which opened later that year. The 1911 stone depot remains on Landing Road and is listed as a contributing property in the Morris Canal Historic District.

The present NJT stop consists of two low-level side platforms and a small shelter. The former station building is no longer used for rail service.

== History ==
=== Early rail service and lake access ===
The Morris & Essex Railroad (M&E) opened through Landing on January 16, 1854, as part of its westward expansion toward Hackettstown. At first, no station was provided at Landing. Travelers bound for Lake Hopatcong used nearby Drakesville station and continued to the lake by road.

Landing developed beside the Morris Canal, which passed near the railroad and used Lake Hopatcong as one of its principal water sources. The canal helped shape the community before the railroad became dominant, and Landing was one of several settlements that served canal traffic. At about 900 feet (270 m) above sea level, the area was the highest point on the canal and on the railroad in New Jersey.

The Delaware, Lackawanna & Western Railroad (DL&W), which leased M&E in 1868, opened a station at Landing in 1882. The decision followed the development of competing rail access to the lake by the Central Railroad of New Jersey, whose Wharton & Northern Railroad served the northern part of Lake Hopatcong. The first DL&W station stood between the tracks and the Morris Canal, near the Landing Road bridge. The station became part of the lake's resort transportation network. Passengers could transfer between trains and steamboats serving hotels, amusement areas, and other lakeside destinations. The Black Line steamboat company began operating in connection with DL&W and Morris Canal interests, while the later White Line steamboat company developed its own access at the southern end of the lake. In 1891, the White Line dredged the swampy southern tip of Lake Hopatcong to create Landing Channel and built a pier near the railroad station.

In 1910, the Morris County Traction Company began electric trolley service in the area, adding another connection between the station and lake destinations.

=== 1911 station ===
The DL&W announced plans for a new Lake Hopatcong station in July 1910. The station was built east of the Landing Road bridge while the railroad was constructing the Lackawanna Cut-Off, a new main line beginning nearby at Port Morris Junction. The Cut-Off was intended to provide a more direct route across northern New Jersey for trains bound for Scranton and points west.

The new station opened on May 28, 1911. The main building was constructed of rough stone with cement trim and a green tile roof. Its interior included a ticket office, waiting room, and baggage room. Because the depot stood above track level on Landing Road, the station complex included stairs, elevated walkways, and elevators for passengers and baggage. The new arrangement also improved movement between the railroad, local roads, and lake transportation.

The Lackawanna Cut-Off opened for service later in 1911. The station also functioned as a transfer point for trains continuing toward Phillipsburg, New Jersey, and Portland, Pennsylvania, by way of the Old Main line.

The Morris Canal closed in 1924, after its freight business had declined in favor of rail transportation. The steamboat dock at Landing was removed, and parts of the former canal area were later filled or redeveloped.

DL&W merged with the Erie Railroad in 1960 to form the Erie Lackawanna Railway (EL). The station and tracks later passed to Conrail in 1976. Conrail sold the stone depot, while passenger service continued from the remaining platforms. The elevated station overpass was condemned in 1978 and demolished in May 1982. New platforms were built to maintain rail service, and the former depot remained standing after it was separated from railroad operations.

=== Preservation ===
After its railroad use ended, the 1911 depot served several commercial tenants, including a real estate office, a hardware store, and an interior design business. The Lake Hopatcong Foundation purchased the building on November 6, 2014, with plans to use it for offices, public programs, and cultural activities.

The building was later restored with support from preservation grants. In 2016, the foundation replaced the roof with glazed clay tiles manufactured by Ludowici Roof Tile, the company that had supplied the original roof tiles in 1911. Work on the roof also revealed deterioration in the building's stone parapets, which became part of the restoration project.

The station was added to the National Register of Historic Places as part of a boundary increase to the Morris Canal Historic District. It was also listed on the New Jersey Register of Historic Places. By 2021, restoration of the building had received funding from the Morris County Historic Preservation Trust Fund and the New Jersey Historic Trust. Preservation New Jersey recognized the project with an award in 2021.

== Station layout ==
The active NJT station has two low-level side platforms and two tracks. A small shelter is located on the westbound platform. The station has a parking lot with 96 spaces and is not accessible under the Americans with Disabilities Act of 1990.

== Future service ==
NJT has undertaken work to restore passenger service on the Lackawanna Cut-Off between Port Morris Junction and a planned station at Andover in Sussex County. The project includes restoration of approximately 7.3 miles (11.7 km) of track west of Port Morris. NJT awarded a contract in 2022 to rehabilitate the Roseville Tunnel, a major element of the Andover extension.

Service to Andover is projected for late 2026. A further extension toward Scranton, Pennsylvania, has also been studied.
