= Arlington Public Schools (disambiguation) =

Arlington Public Schools can refer to these U.S. school districts:

- Arlington Public Schools in Arlington County, Virginia
- Arlington Public Schools in Arlington, Massachusetts
- Arlington Public Schools in Arlington, Nebraska
- Arlington Public Schools in Arlington, Washington

See also

- Arlington Central School District in Poughkeepsie, New York
- Arlington Heights School District 25 in Arlington Heights, Illinois
- Arlington Independent School District in Arlington, Texas
- Arlington School District in Arlington, Oregon
- Mount Arlington School District in Mount Arlington, New Jersey
- North Arlington School District in North Arlington, New Jersey
- Upper Arlington City School District in Upper Arlington, Ohio
