= Mount Arlington School District =

Place in Morris County, New Jersey, US

Address
- 446 Howard Boulevard Mount Arlington, Morris County, New Jersey, 07856; United States
- Coordinates: 40.933784°N 74.629666°W

District information
- Grades: PreK-8
- Superintendent: Jane Mullins Jameson (interim)
- Business administrator: Robin Tedesco
- Schools: 2

Students and staff
- Enrollment: 357 (as of 2023–24)
- Faculty: 42.4 FTEs
- Student–teacher ratio: 8.4:1

Other information
- District Factor Group: GH
- Website: www.mtarlingtonk8.org
Ind.	Per pupil	District spending	Rank (*)	K-8 average	%± vs. average
1A	Total Spending	$19,861	42	$18,891	5.1%
1	Budgetary Cost	17,705	55	14,159	25.0%
2	Classroom Instruction	9,538	43	8,659	10.2%
6	Support Services	3,485	55	2,167	60.8%
8	Administrative Cost	1,985	70	1,547	28.3%
10	Operations & Maintenance	2,479	58	1,612	53.8%
13	Extracurricular Activities	206	46	104	98.1%
16	Median Teacher Salary	60,920	49	61,136
Data from NJDoE 2014 Taxpayers' Guide to Education Spending. *Of K-8 districts with up to 400 students. Lowest spending=1; Highest=71

The Mount Arlington School District is a community public school district that serves students in pre-kindergarten through eighth grade from Mount Arlington, in Morris County, in the U.S. state of New Jersey.

As of the 2023–24 school year, the district, comprised of two schools, had an enrollment of 357 students and 42.4 classroom teachers (on an FTE basis), for a student–teacher ratio of 8.4:1.

For ninth through twelfth grades, public school students attend Roxbury High School in Roxbury, as part of a sending/receiving relationship with the Roxbury School District. As of the 2023–24 school year, the high school had an enrollment of 1,171 students and 115.9 classroom teachers (on an FTE basis), for a student–teacher ratio of 10.1:1.

== History ==
Students from Mount Arlington have been sent to Roxbury High School since the school was created in 1903.

The district had been classified by the New Jersey Department of Education as being in District Factor Group "GH", the third-highest of eight groupings. District Factor Groups organize districts statewide to allow comparison by common socioeconomic characteristics of the local districts. From lowest socioeconomic status to highest, the categories are A, B, CD, DE, FG, GH, I and J.

== Schools ==
Schools in the district (with 2023–24 enrollment from the National Center for Education Statistics) are:

Schools

- Edith M. Decker School (with 133 students in grades PreK–2, including a pre-school disabilities program). Along with classrooms, the facility contains a computer lab and a children's library.
- Mount Arlington Public School (with 217 students in grades 3–8). The facility contains a computer lab, an art and music classrooms, and a media center.

Both schools are located along the eastern bank of Lake Hopatcong.

== Administration ==
Core members of the district's administration are:

- Jane Mullins Jameson, interim superintendent
- Robin Tedesco, business administrator and board secretary
- Joe Coladarci, principal

== Board of education ==
The district's board of education, comprised of nine members, sets policy and oversees the fiscal and educational operation of the district through its administration. As a Type II school district, the board's trustees are elected directly by voters to serve three-year terms of office on a staggered basis, with three seats up for election each year held (since 2012) as part of the November general election. The board appoints a superintendent to oversee the district's day-to-day operations and a business administrator to supervise the business functions of the district.
