= Roxbury High School (New Jersey) =

High school in Morris County, New Jersey, US

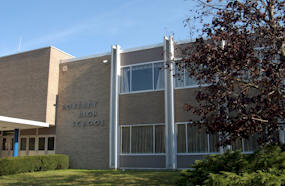

Location
- 1 Bryant Drive; Roxbury, Morris County, New Jersey 07876; United States; 40.863961°N 74.644469°W

Information
- Type: Public high school
- Motto: Every day is a great day to be a Gael
- Established: 1903
- NCES School ID: 341434004524
- Principal: William Crispino
- Faculty: 115.9 FTEs
- Enrollment: 1,171 (as of 2023–24)
- Student to teacher ratio: 10.1:1
- Colors: Navy and Vegas Gold
- Athletics conference: Northwest Jersey Athletic Conference (general); North Jersey Super Football Conference (football)
- Team name: Gaels
- Rivals: Dover High School; Hackettstown High School; Randolph High School
- Newspaper: Roxbury Review
- Yearbook: Echo
- Website: rhs.roxbury.org

Roxbury High School is a four-year comprehensive public high school in the Succasunna section of Roxbury in Morris County, in the U.S. state of New Jersey, serving students in ninth grade through twelfth grades, operating as the lone secondary school of the Roxbury School District, which serves more than 3,500 students.

The school serves students from Roxbury, as well as from Mount Arlington, who attend as part of a sending/receiving relationship with the Mount Arlington School District; there were 160 students sent from Mount Arlington in 2023–24.

As of the 2023–24 school year, the school had an enrollment of 1,171 students and 115.9 classroom teachers (on an FTE basis), for a student–teacher ratio of 10.1:1. There were 165 students (14.1% of enrollment) eligible for free lunch and 68 (5.8% of students) eligible for reduced-cost lunch.

== History ==
The high school was established in 1903, operating on the top floor of a two-story building that served grades 1–12. In its early days, the high school served students from Chester Township, Hopatcong, Jefferson Township, Mount Arlington, Mount Olive and Randolph, who attended as part of sending/receiving relationships, with tuition paid by their local school districts. A referendum was held in 1959 on the construction of a new high school to be located on a plot of land bordering Eyland Avenue. Construction was completed in 1961, with the building dedicated on November 25, 1961, as the first to be named Roxbury High School. With a growing student population across the township, a new building was constructed adjacent to the existing high school on land bordering Hillside Avenue and opened on September 6, 1972

In 2017, the district brought on former Roxbury Chief of Police, James Simonetti, to serve as the Director of Security to improve safety procedures. This included the addition of man-traps, upgraded security cameras, revisiting policies and procedures, as well as improving the vetting of visitors. Roxbury was ranked as the 17th safest school in New Jersey (of 237 districts) and 120th out of 10,576 nationwide in 2018.

== Academic programs ==
Eisenhower Middle School and Roxbury High School are choice schools for the Fine and Performing Arts. Students are eligible to apply for an array of programs including three levels of symphonic band, four levels of choir, multiple levels of dance, an accomplished strings program, and electives such as music theory and Broadway musical theatre. In addition, there are nine select group choirs, a variety of wind ensembles, and two marching bands that allow students to pursue interests beyond the school day in the co-curricular domain. There is an annual fall drama and a spring musical. An extensive visual art program is offered, with a four-year college prep track including AP Art Studio, and numerous electives that include four levels of ceramics, three of photography, graphic design and yearbook production. Co-curricular opportunities are also available in the visual arts. Students are eligible to participate if they're in grades 7-12, with a maximum of 6 seats available for new students. Students are selected through an application process with the implementation of a waitlist and a lottery if more than six requests are received.

The Academy for Sports Medicine, operated in conjunction with the Morris County Vocational School District, operates at Roxbury High School.

== Awards, recognition and rankings ==
The school was the 74th-ranked public high school in New Jersey out of 411 schools statewide according to Niche.com's annual rankings in 2019. Their site explains, “Niche ranks nearly 100,000 schools and districts based on statistics and millions of opinions from students and parents.”

In 2016, Roxbury was ranked by New Jersey Monthly magazine as 52nd out of 337 schools.

=== Future Ready ===
In 2017, Roxbury High School and Eisenhower Middle School earned Bronze Certification through the Future Ready Schools - New Jersey. This inaugural program recognizes and supports schools who are deepening student learning and developing a culture of digital innovation to use technology, digital content, and media to better prepare students for the future. This program is in partnership with the New Jersey Department of Education, New Jersey School Boards Association and New Jersey Institute of Technology.

=== Sustainable Jersey for Schools ===
In 2023, the Roxbury School District received bronze-level certification through Sustainable Jersey for Schools, a program provides grants, resources and trainingto encourage schools to become more sustainable. That year, Roxbury High School received silver status for the first time.

== Campus ==
Built in 1971, Roxbury High School is a 281,740-square-foot (26,175 m^{2}), two-story building with a cafeteria, one full gym, an auxiliary gym, and an auditorium. In addition to the turf field, the school has one soccer field, two softball fields, a baseball field, three outdoor volleyball courts, a utility field (used for lacrosse, field hockey, and soccer), and three practice fields.

== Administration ==
The school's principal is William Crispino. His core administrative team includes two assistant principals.

=== Band ===
In 2005, Roxbury performed "The Music of Scheherazade", and placed 4th overall at the United States Scholastic Band Association (USSBA) All-States Championships at Giants Stadium with a score of 96.48. In 2007, records were broken with the Gaels performing their show "Deja View" winning them USSBA Group 6 Open NJ state championships and winning 1st place overall at the USSBA Regionals with a score of 98.00. In 2009, Roxbury won 1st place at National Championships with their show "Upon A King", receiving a score of 98.188, Roxbury's highest score ever received. The band won the state championship in the Group IV Open Class in the 2015 competition held at High Point Solutions Stadium.

The Roxbury Honors Wind Symphony has performed at such events as the Midwest Clinic.

In 2019, the Roxbury High School Indoor Percussion was named Scholastic A Class Champions at the USBands Indoor Percussion Championships at Fair Lawn High School. With 35 students, grades 8-12, they competed with their show, "We Built Our Own World". Out of four groups, Roxbury placed first in the categories of Music, Visual, and Visual Effect with a score of 92.75.

Composer Robert Farnon composed The Gaels: An American Wind Symphony, as a commission to the Roxbury High School band in honor of the school's mascot, the Gael. The piece made its world debut in May 2006.

In 2023, 2024, and 2025 the Roxbury High School Marching Gaels won the Group AA title at the New Jersey Marching Band Directors' Association State Championships held at The College of New Jersey, with respective scores of 91.1, 93.5 and 93.1.. In 2026 the Roxbury High School Marching Gaels won the Class 3 title at the New Jersey Marching Band Directors' Association Class Championships held at Piscataway High School with a score of 92.6.

== Extracurricular activities ==
Roxbury has an extensive selection of extra-curricular activities, which involve a large portion of the student body.

== Athletics ==
Roxbury High School's mascot is the Gael, an Irish/Scottish warrior, which was a nickname given to the football team in the 1930s by local news writers because of three Irish brothers on the team that were standouts. The Roxbury High School Gaels compete in the American Division of the Northwest Jersey Athletic Conference, which includes public and private high schools in Morris, Sussex and Warren counties, and was established following a reorganization of sports leagues in Northern New Jersey by the New Jersey State Interscholastic Athletic Association (NJSIAA). Prior to the NJSIAA's 2010 realignment, the school had competed as part of the Iron Hills Conference, which included public and private high schools in Essex, Morris and Union counties. With 1,010 students in grades 10-12, the school was classified by the NJSIAA for the 2019–20 school year as Group III for most athletic competition purposes, which included schools with an enrollment of 761 to 1,058 students in that grade range. The football team competes in the Freedom Blue division of the North Jersey Super Football Conference, which includes 112 schools competing in 20 divisions, making it the nation's biggest football-only high school sports league. The school was classified by the NJSIAA as Group III North for football for 2024–2026, which included schools with 700 to 884 students.

=== Athletics teams ===
- Baseball (boys)
- Basketball (boys and girls)
- Cheerleading (girls)
- Competitive cheer (girls)
- Cross country (boys and girls)
- Field hockey (girls)
- Football (boys)
- Golf (boys)
- Gymnastics
- Ice hockey (boys)
- Lacrosse (boys and girls)
- Soccer (boys and girls)
- Softball (girls)
- Spring track (boys and girls)
- Swimming (boys and girls)
- Tennis (boys and girls)
- Volleyball (girls)
- Winter track (boys and girls)
- Wrestling (boys)

=== Athletics history ===
The softball team won the North sectional championship in 1972, the North II sectional title in 1973 and won the Group IV state championship in 1992 against Middletown High School North. The 1992 team finished the season with a 24–5 record after winning the Group IV title by defeating Middletown North by a score of 3–2 in the championship game. The 2021 team finished with a 20–7 record, winning the North I, Group III Sectional Championship against Passaic Valley High School.

The wrestling team won the North II Group IV sectional championship in 1983 and 1996, won the North II Group III title in 2004, won in North II Group III in 2011 and 2014, and won in North I Group IV in 2015, 2016 and 2018.

The baseball team has won the Morris County Tournament six times, tied for the second-most in tournament history, winning in 1996-1998, 2011, 2014 and 2015.

The girls soccer team won the Group IV state championship in 1997, defeating Eastern Regional High School in the final game of the playoff tournament.

The girls track team won the Group III indoor relay championship in 1999.

The girls track team won the indoor Group III state title in 2000 and 2008.

The girls cross country team won the Group IV state title in 2004 and 2005.

The ice hockey team won the Haas Cup in 2008 and the Halvorsen Cup in 2016 and 2017.

The 2015 girls volleyball team finished with a 22–6 record, winning the Morris County Tournament championship, the program's first, against West Morris Central High School. The 2021 team finished with a 24–5 record, winning the North I Group III sectional championship against Wayne Valley High School, and the Morris County Tournament title against West Morris Mendham High School.

=== Football history ===
The first Roxbury football team was formed by students in 1913 and lost their first game to Newton High School by a score of 7–0. The first of Roxbury's early rivals was Dover High School, who they beat for the first time in 1917 by a score of 7–6. A turkey dinner was given to the team whenever they topped the Tigers. By 1929, Hackettstown High School became the annual Thanksgiving Day contest. The series ended in 1976 with a 34–7 Gael victory; Roxbury and Hackettstown have not played since. One of the most intense rivalries in the state began in 1965 against Randolph High School. The rivalry with Randolph was listed at 18th on NJ.com's 2017 list "Ranking the 31 fiercest rivalries in N.J. HS football". Randolph leads the rivalry with a 29–20–3 overall record as of 2017.

The early 1930s saw a string of five County Class 'B' Championships, climaxed by Roxbury's only undefeated season in 1934, when the team won the Morris County title and finished with an 8-0-2 record. The 1941 team, known as the Galloping Gaels, registered six shutouts. In addition to winning the Morris County Championship, the 1942 team posted the Gaels' 100th victory. The 1959 team won the school's third state championship, being declared North II, Group II champions after finishing the season with a 6-2-1 mark. Roxbury's 200th win came in 1964 and the 300th win came in 1979, a 30–10 win over Dover High School. Roxbury's 400th win was in 1998 over Columbia High School, 40–0. The 500th win was in 2014 over Morristown High School.

The 1986 and 1987 teams advanced to the state tournament finals, losing to Union High School on both occasions. 1987 was the senior season of Dave Moore '88, a future NFL pro-bowler, whose #88 became the team's first number to be retired.

2002 marked Head Coach Cosmo Lorusso's first year in Roxbury, when the Gaels made the sectional semi-finals and finished as IHC-Iron Tri-Champions. The 2009 team jumped to an 8–0 start, quickly winning the inaugural Northwest Jersey Athletic Conference-American Division championship. After two sound victories to start the '09 postseason, Roxbury faced East Orange Campus High School in the state sectional championship, played at Giants Stadium, winning 14-6 and clinching the fifth state title in school history, as well as setting the school record for wins in a season with 11.

In 2012, the Roxbury High School Football Gaels played their 100th season of football, celebrating it with an 11–1 season and the program's sixth state championship with a 14–6 victory over Pascack Valley High School in the North I Group IV finals at Kean University.

State sectional championships

Year	Coach	Record	Section
1926	John B. Shambaugh	5-2-1	North Jersey Class C
1928	Robert Mohor	5-2-1	North Jersey Class C
1959	Bob Schiffner	6-2-1	North II, Group II
1998	John Quinn	10–2	North II, Group IV
2009	Cosmo Lorusso	11-1	North I, Group IV
2012	Cosmo Lorusso	11-1	North I, Group IV
State Sectional Championships			6

== Notable alumni ==
- Lois Barker (1923-2018, class of 1941), utility player who played in the All-American Girls Professional Baseball League during the 1950 season
- Ralph Barkman (1907–1998). American football player who played in the NFL for the Orange Tornadoes
- Dylan Castanheira (born 1995), soccer player who plays as a goalkeeper for Fort Lauderdale CF in USL League One
- Paige Monaghan (born 1996), professional soccer player who currently plays for the Utah Royals of the National Women's Soccer League
- Dave Moore (born 1969, class of 1988), tight end, fullback and long snapper who played in the NFL for the Buffalo Bills and Tampa Bay Buccaneers
