= Landing Masonry Bridge =

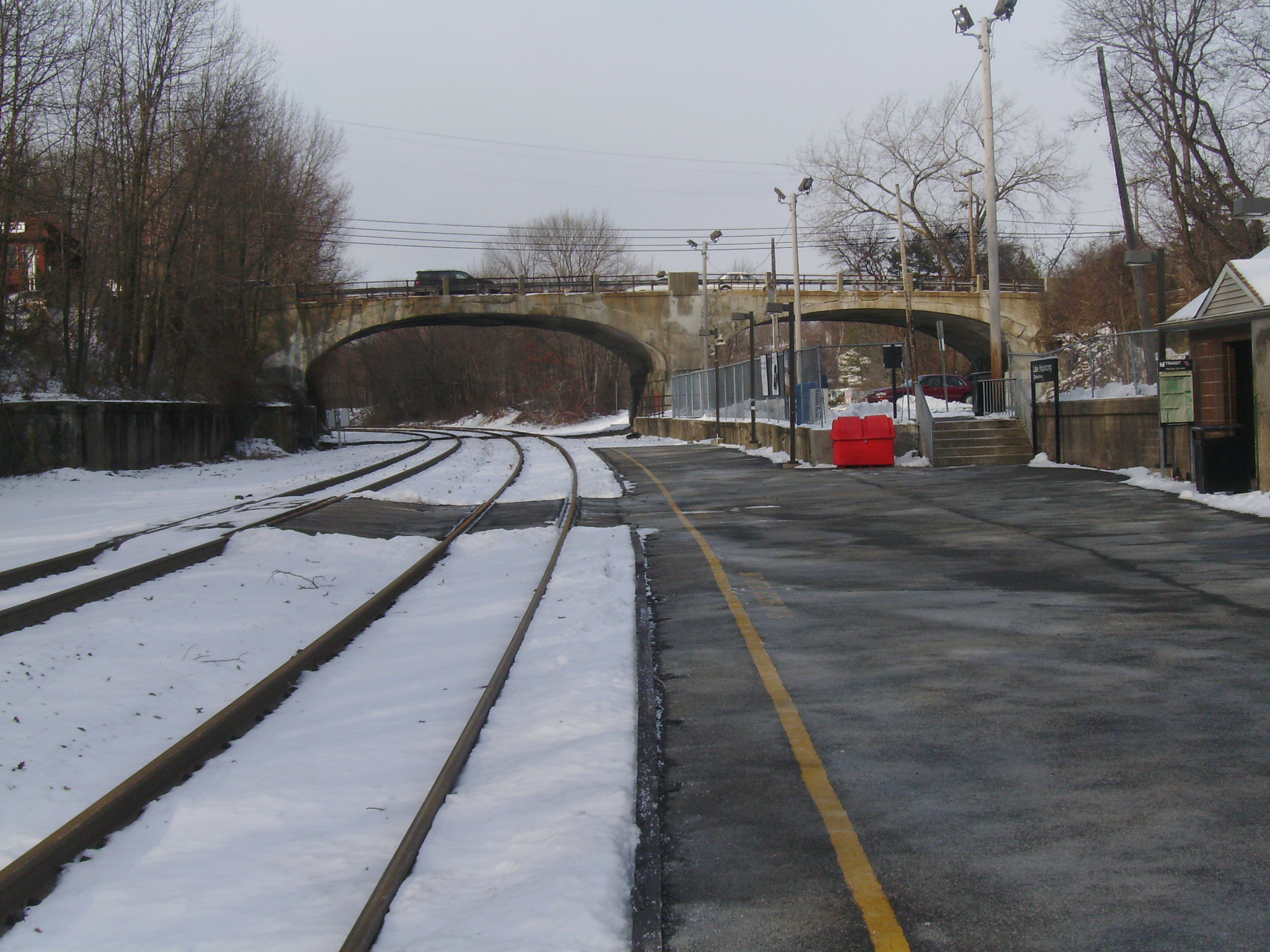
- Landing Masonry Bridge towers over the Lake Hopatcong Station and New Jersey Transit's Montclair-Boonton and Morristown Lines in Landing, New Jersey.
- Coordinates: 40°54′16.95″N 74°39′56.76″W
- Carries: 2 lanes of Morris County Route 631 (Landing Road)
- Crosses: Morristown Line / Montclair-Boonton Line
- Locale: Landing, New Jersey
- Official name: Landing Road Bridge / Bridge 44.53
- Maintained by: Morris County Highway Department
- ID number: ++++++++1400073

Characteristics
- Design: Stone
- Material: Concrete
- Total length: 136 feet (41 m)
- Width: Two lanes
- Longest span: 2 spans
- No. of spans: 1
- Piers in water: 3

History
- Designer: Delaware, Lackawanna and Western Railroad
- Construction start: 1907
- Construction end: ~1911
- Opened: ~1911

Location
- Interactive map of Landing Masonry Bridge

The Landing Masonry Bridge, also designated Bridge 44.53, is a 136-foot (41 m) stone structure built in 1907 by the Delaware, Lackawanna and Western Railroad in Landing, New Jersey, United States. Located 44.53 miles up the rail line from Hoboken Terminal, the bridge carries the two-lane Morris County Route 631 (Landing Road) over the Morristown Line and Montclair-Boonton Line railroad tracks maintained by New Jersey Transit, and sits several hundred feet north of NJT's Lake Hopatcong Station. By 2009, it was deteriorated and structurally deficient, and plans were announced for it to be replaced with a four-lane bridge by NJT and the New Jersey Department of Transportation.

More than a decade passed before the work actually began, with demolition of several nearby buildings in June 2023.

== History ==
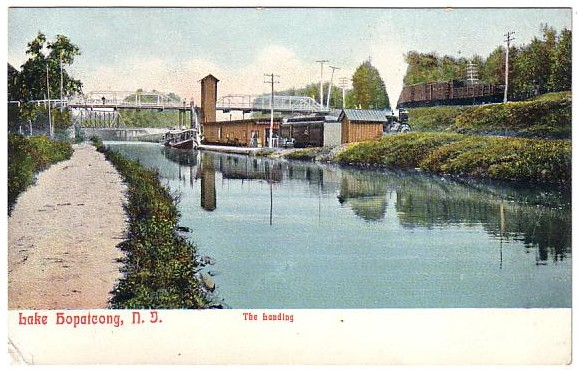
The old Landing Road bridge before 1911 as viewed from the Morris Canal.

In the late 1800s, a pony truss bridge carried Landing Road over the Morris Canal (eastern span) and the DL&W mainline (western span). The steel, cable-stayed structure had two towers to support it, with stairs to the station below. The structure also had two pony truss sidings.

In 1907 and 1908, the truss bridge was replaced by Landing Masonry Bridge, a stone structure whose two arches mirrored the older spans. It also carried tracks for the Morris County Traction Company trolleys. The train station sat just north of the bridge's central pier. The older bridge survived for about three years as a pedestrian route to the train station.

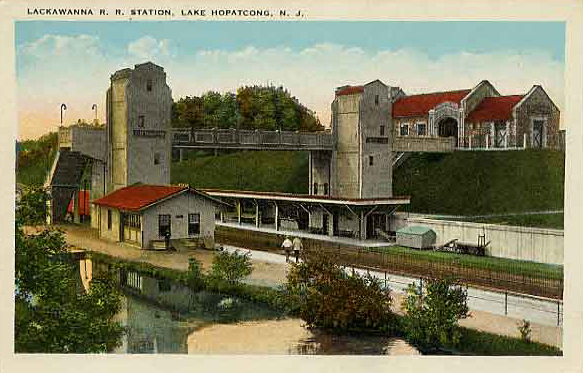
The Lake Hopatcong Station upon opening in 1911.

In 1910, the DL&W began building a new Lake Hopatcong Station south of the bridges in anticipation of the opening of the Lackawanna Cut-Off to the north. Completed for $28,500, and opened on May 28, 1911, the new station had a main building on Landing Road and two large pedestrian towers. This rendered the old bridge completely redundant, and it was eventually demolished.

The Landing Masonry Bridge continued to be used by automobiles along Mount Arlington Road and Old Netcong Road. By 1925, parts of the Morris Canal were filled in during construction of Station Road under the old bridge, allowing access to the new station. The use of the Morris Canal ended in 1924, and in the next five years, it was filled in by different structures.

Currently, Lake Hopatcong Station's 96-space parking lot runs under the eastern arch.

== Planned replacement ==
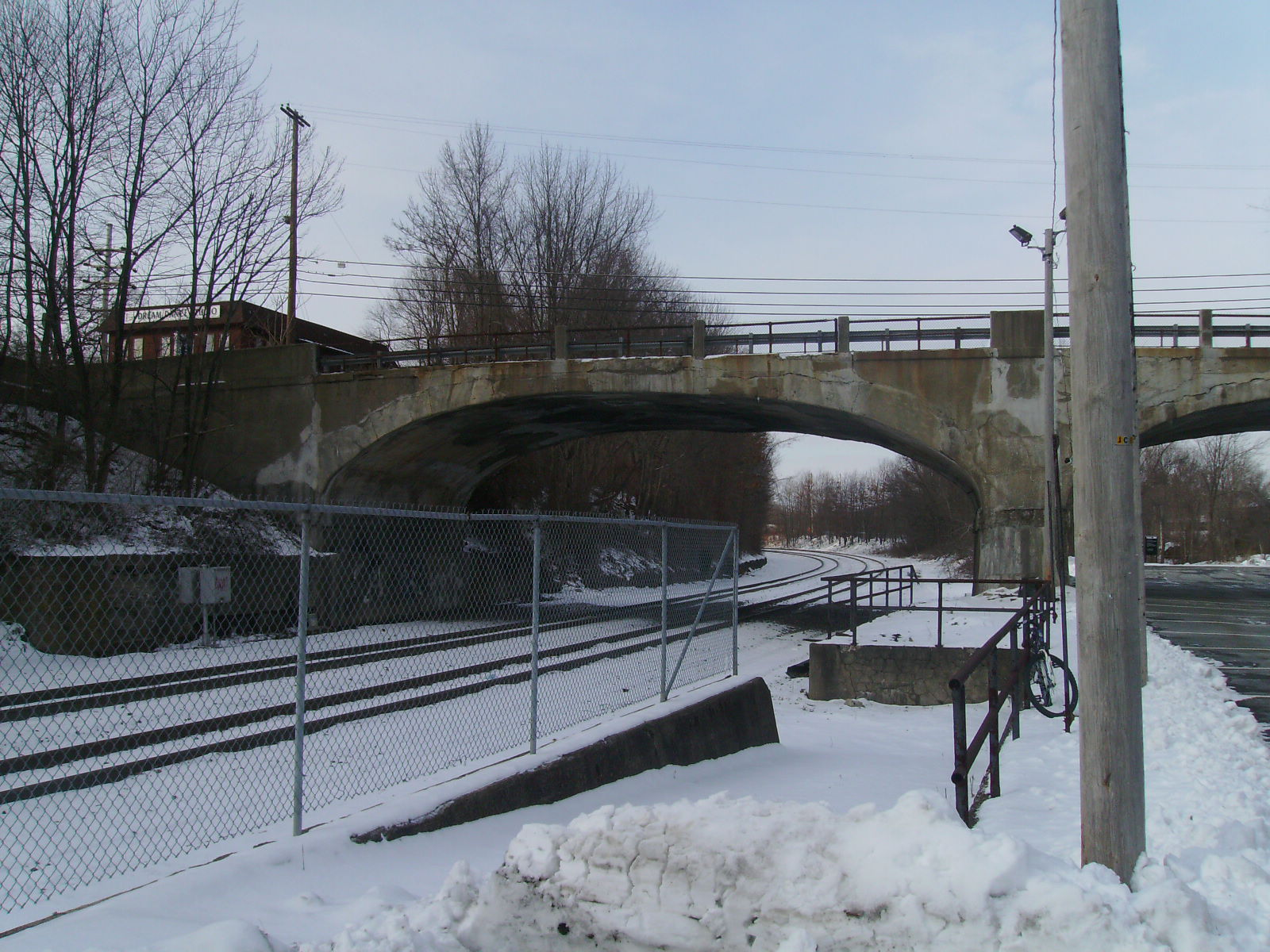
Closeup of the bridge over the rail line, showing deterioration of the structure

The Landing Masonry Bridge was rebuilt and rehabilitated in 1972.

Now traversed by Morris County Route 631, it has severely deteriorated. The bridge has become incapable of holding the current and future traffic loads along Landing Road from Interstate 80 and Sussex County, and along with the aging bridge geometry, the stone masonry is beginning to develop cracks. The bridge was given a 19% sufficiency rating and deemed structurally deficient by the United States Department of Transportation.

In its 2010 Capital Program, the New Jersey Department of Transportation laid out a plan to replace the bridge with a four-lane one, with help from the Morris County Highway Department. The plan would shift Landing Road and add a traffic light. Morris County officials say the changes will be made with community input. The New Jersey Turnpike Authority was to give $800,000 during 2010 for design, $750,000 for right-of-way acquisition in 2011 and $6.575 million in fiscal year 2012 to build it.

But more than a decade passed before the project actually got under way. It took time for Morris County to purchase the necessary land and buildings for the new planned bridge. Environmental issues and litigation caused delays. An announced start date of late 2021 was pushed to late 2022. The project got underway in June 2023 with the demolition of some nearby buildings.

== See also ==
- Lake Hopatcong
