= Lake Rogerene =

9-acre lake in New Jersey, US

- Location within Morris County, New Jersey Location within New Jersey Location within the United States
- Interactive map of Lake Rogerene
- Location: Mount Arlington, New Jersey
- Coordinates: 40°53′52″N 74°39′16″W
- Type: Lake
- Etymology: Rogerenes – a Christian group with practices similar to those of the Quakers
- Basin countries: United States
- Managing agency: Lake Rogerene Civic Association
- Surface area: 9 acres (3.6 ha)
- Average depth: 6.28 feet (1.91 m)
- Max. depth: 9.6 feet (2.9 m)
- Water volume: 56.79 acre-feet (70,050 m^{3})
- Surface elevation: 929 feet (283 m)
- Website: Website
- References: GNIS

Lake Rogerene (or Rogerine) is a privately managed 9–acre lake in Mount Arlington, New Jersey, within the boundary of Roxbury Township and encircled by the loop road Rogerene Way. The lake is managed by the Lake Rogerene Civic Association. In October 2020, three hiking paths were opened around the lake, called the Lake Rogerene Trails, with a total trail distance of 0.92 miles (1.48 km).

== History ==
Lake Rogerene was originally called Mountain Pond when roughly 30 families from New London arrived in the area in the early 18th Century. The settlers where Rogerenes – a Christian group with practices similar to those of the Quakers.

There is some debate as to the exact date of their arrival, with official records citing 1734, although one writer at the time mentions the Rogerenes coming to the area prior to 1708. Official records state that the name of the lake was changed to Lake Rogerene in 1925.

By 1780 most of the original Rogerene settlers had left the area or mingled into the general population.

Since the early 20th Century, the area has developed into a small lakeside community with summer homes around the edge and a small beach used by residents.

== Ecology ==
There are several species of fish found in the lake, including largemouth bass (Micropterus salmoides), chain pickerel (Esox niger), and spotted bass (M. punctulatus).

Lake Rogerene has historically suffered from severe infestations of the invasive aquatic weed, Eurasian milfoil, and associated sediment build-up.

== Invasive weed management ==
In 2019 the Lake Rogerene Civic Association commissioned a nature-based biotechnology remediation programme, to deal with the excessive growth of invasive aquatic weeds (predominantly Eurasian milfoil). These weeds choked the waters, while the lake had also been getting gradually shallower as organic sediment from decomposed weeds built up on the bottom in annual seasonal die-offs.

In July 2019, a bathymetric scan of the lake showed that the total volume of the water in the lake was 56.79 acre-feet (70,050 m^{3}), average depth was 6.28 feet (1.91 m) and maximum depth was 9.6 feet (2.9 m).

An initial herbicide treatment killed off most of the invasive weeds in May 2020, but this added to the organic sediment build-up on the lake floor; the following month the total volume of the water in the lake was 52.41 acre-feet (64,650 m^{3}) and average depth was 5.8 feet (1.8 m).

Enzymatic bio-dredging was then used to digest this organic sediment and remediate the water quality in the lake. As of October 2020, bathymetric scanning showed the lake to contain a total water volume of 58.72 acre-feet (72,430 m^{3}). The average depth of the lake was 6.49 feet (1.98 m), with a maximum depth of 10.77 feet (3.28 m).
