= The Shops at Ledgewood Commons =

Ledgewood Commons
- Coordinates: 40.873°N 74.652°W
- Address: 461 Route 10; Ledgewood, NJ 07852
- Opened: 1972
- Closed: 2016 (original mall)
- Developer: Intercoast Development
- Owner: Urban Edge Properties (NYSE: UE)
- Num. of stores: 18+
- Floor area: 448,000 sq ft (41,600 m^{2})
- Floors: 1
- Public transit: NJ Transit bus: 875
- Website: https://uedge.com/property/ledgewood-commons

Ledgewood Commons is a shopping plaza in the Ledgewood, section of Roxbury, New Jersey, United States. Its anchors are Walmart, Burlington, and Marshalls. It is an outdoor shopping plaza with a gross leasable area of 448,000 sq ft (41,600 m^{2}) The site covers 51.6 acres (20.9 ha) and has 2,223 parking spaces.

From the mall's opening in 1972 until 2016, it was branded Ledgewood Mall as a 518,246-square-foot (48,147 m^{2}) enclosed mall.

== History ==
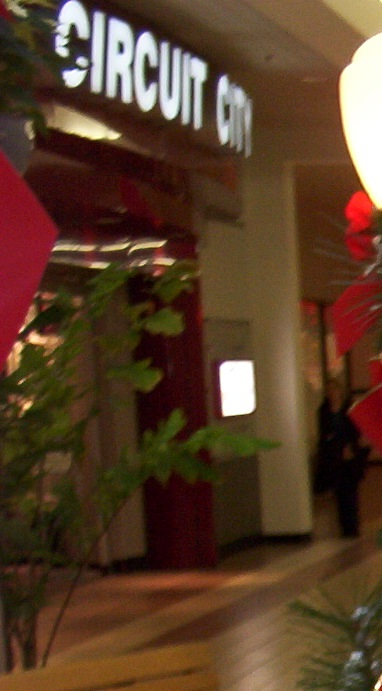
The former Circuit City in the mall before it closed

=== 1972–2016: Ledgewood Mall ===
The center was originally opened in 1972 as Ledgewood Mall, with anchors of W. T. Grant store and Finast. By 1980, the mall's anchors were Rickel, Jamesway, and Arthur's Catalog Showroom. These anchors remained for over a decade.

The Rickel space later closed and became Sports Authority. Phar-Mor and Marshalls also opened. Federated Department Stores announced in July 1993 that it would be opening a 60,000-square-foot (5,600 m^{2}) Stern's store in fall 1994, as part of a major nationwide expansion of the chain. This store was converted to a Macy's in 2001 when Stern's stores were closed. Jamesway closed in December 1995 following the company's liquidation. By 1999, Walmart replaced both the former Jamesway and Arthur's stores, and Circuit City, which has since closed as part of the economic collapse of that retail chain, was added as well. Phar-Mor eventually became an Ashley Furniture HomeStore location. From 2009 to 2017, Circuit City became Spirit Halloween every September until October. In 2018 the Spirit Halloween relocated to the nearby Roxbury Mall.

By the early-mid 2010s, many of the mall's former tenants relocated to the nearby Roxbury Mall or other nearby strip malls.

=== 2016–present: The Shops at Ledgewood Commons ===
In 2016, JV Partnership, Advance Realty, Debartolo Development & Invesco bought the mall. The owners had plans for a redevelopment that would turn the mall into an open-air power center. The owners announced that Barnes & Noble would get a new building at the site of the former Sports Authority . The former Macy's building was demolished on November 30, 2017, which kicked off the construction project. As of June 2018, much of the mall had been demolished, with only a small seating area remaining open between Marshalls and Ashley Home Furniture. What is not already demolished had been closed off to the public. In September 2018, the owners of the mall announced that Five Below, Ulta Beauty, DSW, Starbucks, Chipotle Mexican Grill and Five Guys had signed leases and would open stores in the mall.

In December 2018, Walmart announced that it would demolish its current store at the mall and replace it with a new modern supercenter store. The old store closed on May 10, 2019, and Walmart started construction on the new store in June 2019, which opened on October 7, 2020, Walmart had originally planned to open on October 17, 2020, but construction finished early and the opening date was moved sooner.

In January 2019, 24 Hour Fitness announced that it would open a gym at the mall. However, in August 2020, the company pulled out of the project after the company filing for bankruptcy.

Also in August 2020, Barnes & Noble closed its first location at the mall, after being at Ledgewood from 1994 to 2020.

On September 9, 2020, Burlington Department Store announced it would officially open a store at the new mall. In March 2021, Burlington Department Store opened.

On July 30, 2021, The Shops At Ledgewood Commons held a grand opening ribbon cutting ceremony which marked the official opening of the new open air power center. Many other stores are set to open. In 2023, Lemon Tree moved to one of the strip malls to make way for Popeyes.

In November 2023, Barnes & Noble announced that it would return to the shopping center in January 2024.

The mall was purchased by Urban Edge Properties in April 2024 for $83.2 million. The next month, the acquirer obtained a 5-year, $50 million mortgage on the property.

== Controversy ==
The construction of the Shops at Ledgewood Commons was given an exception from Governor Phil Murphy's Essential Construction order during the COVID-19 pandemic. Construction workers protested the decision, though the Mayor of Roxbury said that the project is essential since the center has a Walmart and restaurants. The Walmart temporarily closed in 2019 for a new supercenter store.
