= Dylan Castanheira =

American soccer player

Personal information
- Date of birth: May 23, 1995 (age 31)
- Place of birth: Landing, New Jersey, U.S.
- Height: 1.88 m (6 ft 2 in)
- Position: Goalkeeper

Youth career
- 2012–2014: Bristol City

College career
Years	Team	Apps	(Gls)
2015–2018	Columbia Lions	47	(0)

Senior career*
Years	Team	Apps	(Gls)
2017–2018	Long Island Rough Riders	11	(0)
2019	Atlanta United 2	21	(0)
2020	Fort Lauderdale CF	11	(0)
2021	Inter Miami	0	(0)
2021	→ Fort Lauderdale CF (loan)	2	(0)
2021	→ San Diego Loyal (loan)	2	(0)
2022	Atlanta United	0	(0)
2022	→ Atlanta United 2 (loan)	2	(0)
- * Club domestic league appearances and goals as of November 14, 2022

Dylan Castanheira (born May 23, 1995) is an American retired soccer player who played as a goalkeeper.

== Career ==
=== Youth and college ===
Raised in the Landing section of Roxbury, New Jersey, Castanheira played prep soccer at Roxbury High School, leaving after his junior year to join the academy team of Bristol City in 2012, before returning to the United States in 2014.

Castanheira played four years of college soccer at Columbia University, where he made 47 appearances for the Lions and kept 25 shutouts.

While at college, Castanheira also played with Premier Development League side Long Island Rough Riders.

=== Professional career ===
On January 11, 2019, Castanheira signed for USL Championship side Atlanta United 2.

Despite having signed for Atlanta United 2, Castanheira was selected by FC Dallas in the fourth round (88th overall) of the 2019 MLS SuperDraft on January 14, 2019. His MLS rights were traded to expansion side Inter Miami CF on January 8, 2020, in exchange for a fourth-round pick in the 2020 MLS SuperDraft.

On January 27, 2021, Castanheira moved to Fort Lauderdale's parent side Inter Miami in Major League Soccer.

On September 3, 2021, Castanheira joined USL Championship club San Diego Loyal on loan following an injury to San Diego goalkeeper Trey Muse.

Following the 2021 season, Castanheira's contract option was declined by Miami.

On December 17, 2021, Dylan was announced as a member of Atlanta United for the following season. Castanheira's contract option was declined by Atlanta following the 2022 season.
