= Rogerenes =

The Rogerenes (also known as the Rogerene Quakers or Rogerines) were a religious sect founded in 1674 by John Rogers (1648–1721) in New London, Connecticut. Rogers was imprisoned and spent some years there. He was influenced by the Seventh Day Baptists and the Religious Society of Friends (Quakers) and opposed the established Puritan church.

Rogerenes initially held to a Seventh Day (Saturday) Sabbath, but over the years began to regard each day as equally holy. Their disdain for Sunday worship often brought them into sharp conflict with their neighbors. Increasingly, they adopted, a pacifist stance, including war tax resistance, which further brought them the ridicule of the larger community.

Some of the Rogerenes left Connecticut and migrated to New Jersey. settling in parts of present-day Morris County. One such group settled in what is now the Landing section of Roxbury Township, New Jersey near Lake Rogerine, known as Mountain Pond in about 1700. Another, smaller group of Rogerenes in about 1734 settled on the eastern side of Schooley's Mountain near present-day Hackettstown, New Jersey.

After their conflict with the Congregational church waned and disappeared the Connecticut Rogerenes became active in the Abolitionist movement. They continued their anti-war stance by sponsoring peace rallies at an open-air site near Mystic that by the 1880s attracted thousands of attendees. The site is now known as the Peace Sanctuary. Because their progressive attitudes were increasingly mirrored in American society as it evolved from the 19th century into the 20th, the Rogerenes gradually disappeared as a distinct social and religious group.
