= Landing, New Jersey =

Populated place in Morris County, New Jersey, US

- Census-designated place
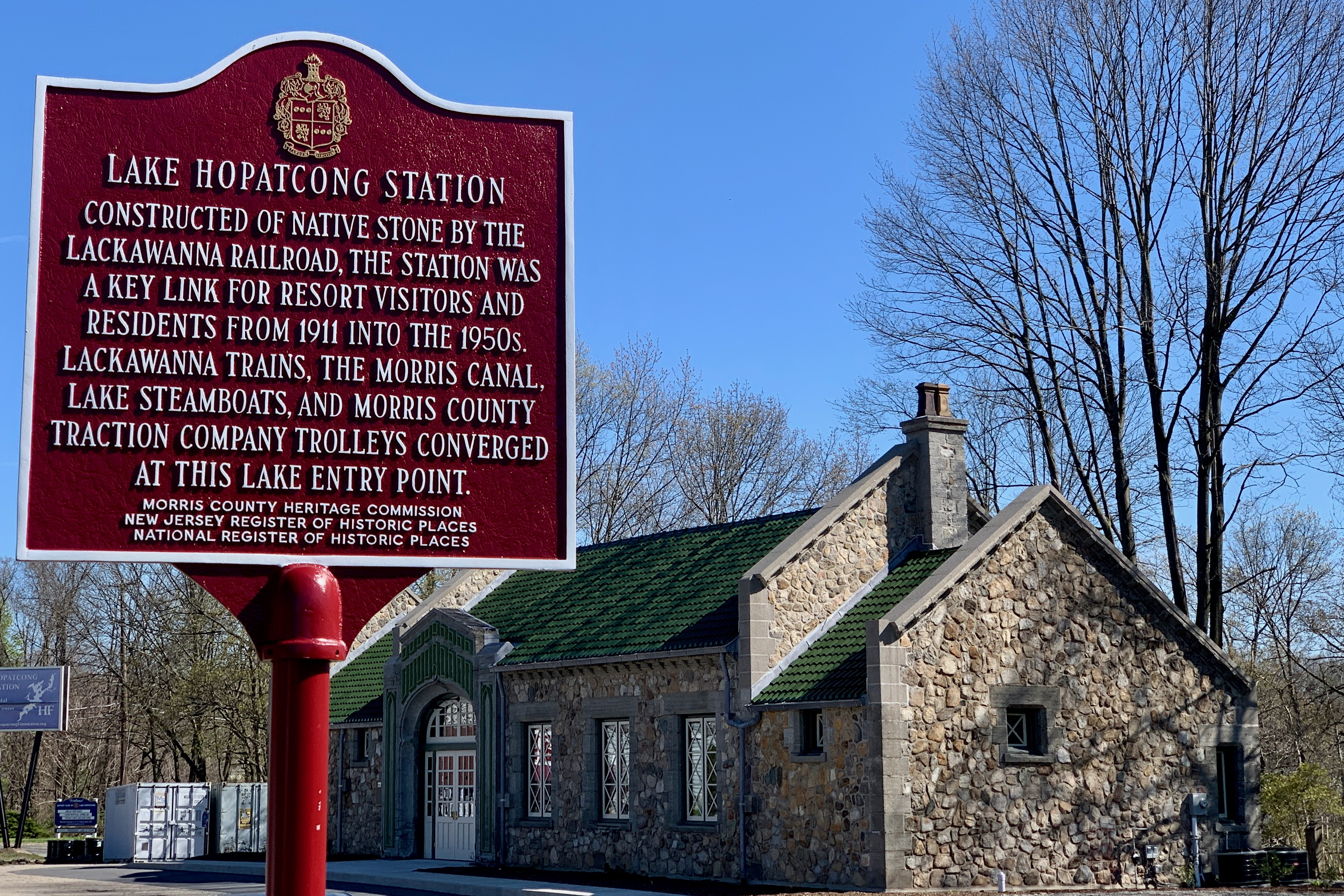
- Lake Hopatcong station in Landing

- Location in Morris County Location in New Jersey Location in the United States
- Coordinates: 40°54′18″N 74°39′55″W
- Country: United States
- State: New Jersey
- County: Morris
- Township: Roxbury

Area
  - Total: 2.480 sq mi (6.42 km^{2})
  - Land: 2.134 sq mi (5.53 km^{2})
  - Water: 0.346 sq mi (0.90 km^{2})
- Elevation: 922 ft (281 m)

Population (2020)
  - Total: 4,296
  - Density: 2,013.12/sq mi (777.27/km^{2})
- ZIP Code: 07850
- Area code: 973
- FIPS code: 34-38700
- GNIS feature ID: 0877660

Landing is an unincorporated community and census-designated place (CDP) in Roxbury Township, Morris County, New Jersey, United States. The community is located at the south end of Lake Hopatcong near Hopatcong State Park. The area is served as United States Postal Service ZIP Code 07850.

As of the 2020 census, the population of the CDP was 4,296.

== History ==
Landing was established as a resort community. From the 1880s through the 1940s, each summer it attracted thousands of people to the shores of Lake Hopatcong. After World War II, it began to decline and transform itself into a large suburban neighborhood. In 2017, measures were passed to give the neighborhood a facelift, the plans including several new, modern buildings, parks and signs. The improvements are expected to be complete in late 2022.

Landing was also an early center of the American explosives industry. In the 1880s the American Forcite Powder Manufacturing Company operated a plant on the lakeshore at Landing, in the area now known as Shore Hills, making forcite, a form of gelatin dynamite. The inventor Hudson Maxim came to the lake through his work with the Forcite company and in 1901 bought a large tract on the western shore; around the same time DuPont, which by then owned powder works on the lake, built a laboratory for him at Landing.

== Geography ==
Landing is on the western edge of Morris County, in the northwestern part of Roxbury Township. It is bordered to the northwest, across Lake Hopatcong and its outlet, the Musconetcong River, by the borough of Hopatcong in Sussex County. Within Morris County, it is bordered to the east by the borough of Mount Arlington, to the south by unincorporated Ledgewood, and to the west by unincorporated Port Morris.

Interstate 80 forms the southern boundary of the Landing CDP, separating it from Ledgewood. Exit 28 (Landing Road) provides access to the community. I-80 leads east 29 miles (47 km) to Paterson and west 28 miles (45 km) to the Delaware Water Gap.

According to the U.S. Census Bureau, the Landing CDP has a total area of 2.480 square miles (6.423 km^{2}), of which 2.134 square miles (5.527 km^{2}) are land and 0.346 square miles (0.896 km^{2}), or 13.95%, are water. The outlet of Lake Hopatcong is along the northern boundary of the community; the Musconetcong River flows out of the lake, leading southwest to the Delaware River. Hopatcong State Park is within the CDP at the lake outlet.

== Demographics ==
Historical population
| Census | Pop. | Note | %± |
|---|---|---|---|
| 2020 | 4,296 | | — |
U.S. Decennial Census; 2020

Landing was first listed as a census designated place in the 2020 U.S. census.

=== 2020 census ===
As of the 2020 census, Landing had a population of 4,296. The median age was 42.1 years. 20.4% of residents were under the age of 18 and 15.6% of residents were 65 years of age or older. For every 100 females there were 94.9 males, and for every 100 females age 18 and over there were 93.0 males age 18 and over.

100.0% of residents lived in urban areas, while 0.0% lived in rural areas.

There were 1,626 households in Landing, of which 30.6% had children under the age of 18 living in them. Of all households, 56.0% were married-couple households, 13.7% were households with a male householder and no spouse or partner present, and 24.3% were households with a female householder and no spouse or partner present. About 20.4% of all households were made up of individuals and 9.1% had someone living alone who was 65 years of age or older.

There were 1,729 housing units, of which 6.0% were vacant. The homeowner vacancy rate was 1.3% and the rental vacancy rate was 7.8%.

Landing CDP, New Jersey – Racial and ethnic composition Note: the US Census treats Hispanic/Latino as an ethnic category. This table excludes Latinos from the racial categories and assigns them to a separate category. Hispanics/Latinos may be of any race.
| Race / Ethnicity (NH = Non-Hispanic) | Pop 2020 | 2020 |
|---|---|---|
| White alone (NH) | 3,006 | 69.97% |
| Black or African American alone (NH) | 149 | 3.47% |
| Native American or Alaska Native alone (NH) | 1 | 0.02% |
| Asian alone (NH) | 181 | 4.21% |
| Native Hawaiian or Pacific Islander alone (NH) | 0 | 0.00% |
| Other race alone (NH) | 21 | 0.49% |
| Mixed race or Multiracial (NH) | 152 | 3.54% |
| Hispanic or Latino (any race) | 786 | 18.30% |
| Total | 4,296 | 100.00% |

== Notable people ==
People who were born in, residents of, or otherwise closely associated with Landing include:

- Dylan Castanheira (born 1995), retired soccer player who played as a goalkeeper for Atlanta United 2
- Karen Ann Quinlan (1954–1985), an important figure in the history of the right to die debate in the United States

== See also ==
- Lake Hopatcong station
- Landing Masonry Bridge
