= Mountain Pond (Old Forge, New York) =

- Location of Mountain Pond within New York
- Location: Herkimer County, New York
- Coordinates: 43°42′25″N 74°52′35″W
- Type: Lake
- Basin countries: United States
- Surface area: 15 acres (6.1 ha)
- Surface elevation: 2,093 ft (638 m)
- Settlements: Old Forge

Mountain Pond is a small lake east of Old Forge in Herkimer County, New York. It drains north via an unnamed creek which flows into First Lake.

== See also ==
- List of lakes in New York
