= Roxbury School District =

School district in Morris County, New Jersey, US

Address
- 42 North Hillside Avenue Roxbury, Morris County, New Jersey, 07876; United States
- Coordinates: 40.888304°N 74.650869°W

District information
- Grades: PreK-12
- Superintendent: Frank Santora
- Business administrator: Joseph Mondanaro
- Schools: 7

Students and staff
- Enrollment: 3,389 (as of 2023–24)
- Faculty: 316.6 FTEs
- Student–teacher ratio: 10.7:1

Other information
- District Factor Group: GH
- Website: www.roxbury.org
Ind.	Per pupil	District spending	Rank (*)	K-12 average	%± vs. average
1A	Total Spending	$18,983	61	$18,891	0.5%
1	Budgetary Cost	14,904	60	14,783	0.8%
2	Classroom Instruction	8,904	61	8,763	1.6%
6	Support Services	2,343	53	2,392	−2.0%
8	Administrative Cost	1,287	26	1,485	−13.3%
10	Operations & Maintenance	1,769	64	1,783	−0.8%
13	Extracurricular Activities	399	98	268	48.9%
16	Median Teacher Salary	62,692	38	64,043
Data from NJDoE 2014 Taxpayers' Guide to Education Spending. *Of K-12 districts with more than 3,500 students. Lowest spending=1; Highest=103

The Roxbury School District is a community public school district that serves students in pre-kindergarten through twelfth grade in Roxbury, in Morris County, in the U.S. state of New Jersey.

As of the 2023–24 school year, the district, comprised of seven schools, had an enrollment of 3,389 students and 316.6 classroom teachers (on an FTE basis), for a student–teacher ratio of 10.7:1.

The district's high school also serves students from Mount Arlington, who attend as part of a sending/receiving relationship; there were 160 students sent from Mount Arlington in 2023–24.

== History ==
Roxbury High School was established in 1903, operating on the top floor of a two-story building that served all grades in the township. When it was established, the high school served students from Chester Township, Hopatcong, Jefferson Township, Mount Arlington, Mount Olive and Randolph, who attended as part of sending/receiving relationships, with tuition paid by their local school districts. Capacity led the district to terminate all of the sending relationships by 1955, other than with Mount Arlington. After a referendum was passed by voters in 1959, construction of a standalone facility was completed in 1961, with the building dedicated on November 25, 1961, as the first to be named Roxbury High School. A new building was constructed next to the original high school and opened for the 1972–73 school year.

The district had been classified by the New Jersey Department of Education as being in District Factor Group "GH", the third-highest of eight groupings. District Factor Groups organize districts statewide to allow comparison by common socioeconomic characteristics of the local districts. From lowest socioeconomic status to highest, the categories are A, B, CD, DE, FG, GH, I and J.

== Schools ==
Schools in the district consists of the following (with 2023–24 enrollment data from the National Center for Education Statistics) are:

Elementary schools

- Franklin Elementary School with 294 students in grades K–4
  - Brian Hamer, principal
- Jefferson Elementary School with 351 students in grades PreK–4
  - Melissa Cosgrove, principal
- Kennedy Elementary School with 255 students in grades K–4
  - Nicole Acevedo, principal
- Nixon Elementary School with 245 students in grades K–4
  - Danielle Lynch, principal

Middle schools

- Lincoln / Roosevelt School with 506 students in grades 5–6
  - Ryan Bartol, principal
- Eisenhower Middle School with 525 students in grades 7–8
  - Paul Gallagher, principal

High school

- Roxbury High School with 1,171 students in grades 9–12
  - William Crispino, principal

== Administration ==
Core members of the district's administration are:

- Frank Santora, superintendent
- Joseph Mondanaro, business administrator and board secretary

== Board of education ==
The district's board of education, comprised of nine members, sets policy and oversees the fiscal and educational operation of the district through its administration. As a Type II school district, the board's trustees are elected directly by voters to serve three-year terms of office on a staggered basis, with three seats up for election each year held (since 2012) as part of the November general election. The board appoints a superintendent to oversee the district's day-to-day operations and a business administrator to supervise the business functions of the district. The Mount Arlington district appoints a tenth trustee to represent its interests on the Roxbury board.

== School policies ==
The Roxbury School District Board of Education requires that all students stand while the Pledge of Allegiance is being recited with their right hand over their heart.

== Controversies ==
=== Discipline of board member ===
In April 2011, an administrative law judge ruled that the Roxbury Board of Education acted outside of its authority when it censured Maureen Castriotta, a school board member. Castriotta had differed with other school board members about spending priorities and had protested against a student protest organized by Superintendent Michael Rossi and high school principal Jeffrey Swanson against funding cuts proposed by Governor Chris Christie. The ALJ vacated the censure, as the matter should have been decided by the School Ethics Commission, rather than by a school board that denied Castriotta's due process. At a June 2010 town hall meeting, Christie supported Castriotta's right to "speak up," and he asked the audience if school administrators would have allowed a student rally that was against the New Jersey Education Association, the state's largest teachers' union.

=== Employee theft ===
In April 2015, the lead mechanic for the Roxbury school district's transportation department was charged with stealing about 1,900 gallons of fuel from the district. The mechanic was ordered to pay back the school district the $8,000 value of the fuel and required to give up his right to public employment in the state.
