= Roxbury, New Jersey =

Township in Morris County, New Jersey, US

- Township
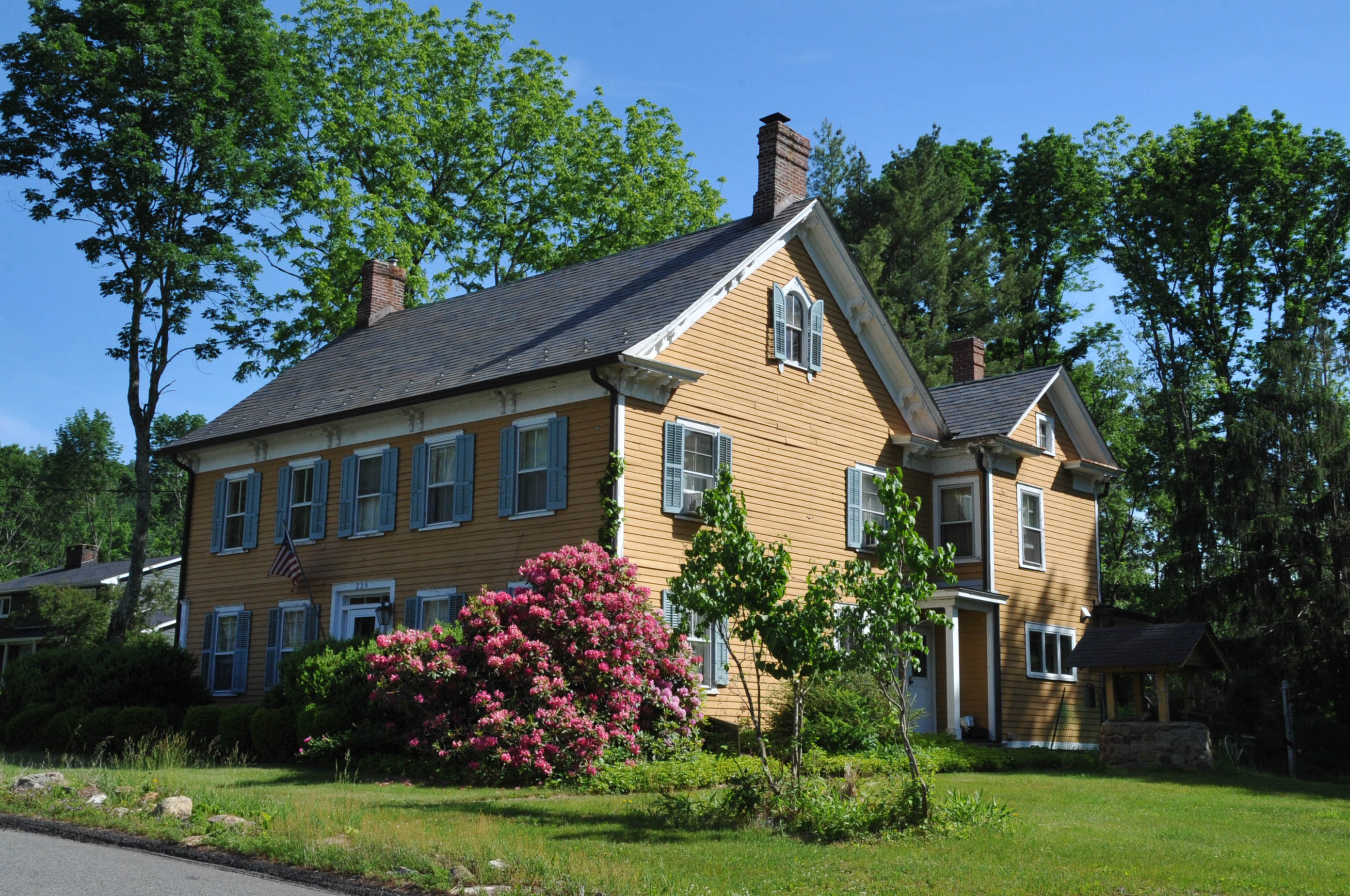
- Cary Station, listed on the U.S. National Register of Historic Places

- Seal

- Location in Morris County and the state of New Jersey.

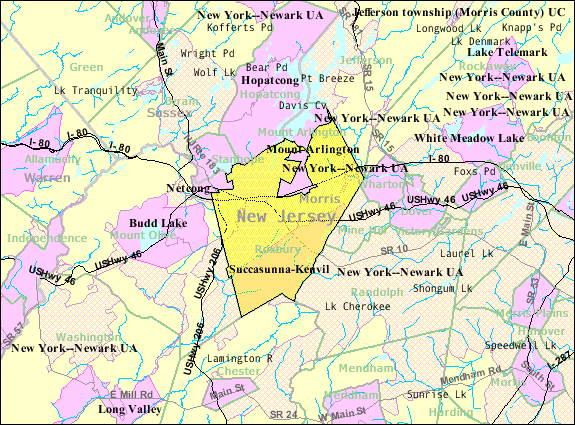
- Census Bureau map of Roxbury Township, New Jersey

- Location in Morris County Location in New Jersey Location in the United States
- Coordinates: 40.88841°N 74.651497°W
- Country: United States
- State: New Jersey
- County: Morris
- Established: December 24, 1740
- Incorporated: February 21, 1798

Government
  - Type: Faulkner Act (council–manager)
  - Body: Township Council
  - Mayor: Shawn Potillo(R,
  - Manager: John Shepherd
  - Municipal clerk: Amy Rhead

Area
  - Total: 21.98 sq mi (56.93 km^{2})
  - Land: 20.85 sq mi (54.01 km^{2})
  - Water: 1.13 sq mi (2.93 km^{2}) 5.14%
  - Rank: 127th of 565 in state 7th of 39 in county
- Elevation: 837 ft (255 m)

Population (2020)
  - Total: 22,950
  - Estimate (2023): 23,205
  - Rank: 117th of 565 in state 6th of 39 in county
  - Density: 1,100.6/sq mi (424.9/km^{2})
  - Rank: 371st of 565 in state 27th of 39 in county
- Time zone: UTC−05:00 (Eastern (EST))
  - Summer (DST): UTC−04:00 (Eastern (EDT))
- ZIP Code: 07852 – Ledgewood; 07876 – Succasunna 07847 – Kenvil
- Area code: 973
- FIPS code: 3402764980
- GNIS feature ID: 0882203
- Website: www.roxburynj.us

Roxbury is a township in western Morris County, in the U.S. state of New Jersey. As of the 2020 United States census, the township's population was 22,950, a decrease of 374 (−1.6%) from the 2010 census count of 23,324, which in turn reflected a decline of 559 (−2.3%) from the 23,883 counted in the 2000 census. The township is located approximately 36 miles (58 km) west-northwest of New York City, 27 miles (43 km) west-northwest of Newark, New Jersey and 26 miles (42 km) east of the Delaware Water Gap on the border of New Jersey and Pennsylvania.

Roxbury was formed on December 24, 1740, from portions of Morris Township. It was formally incorporated by the Township Act of 1798 of the New Jersey Legislature on February 21, 1798, as part of the state's initial group of 104 townships. Portions of the township were taken to form Mendham Township (March 29, 1749), Washington Township (April 2, 1798), Chester Township (April 1, 1799), Jefferson Township (February 11, 1804), Mount Olive Township (March 22, 1871), Mount Arlington (November 3, 1890) and Netcong (October 23, 1894).

== Geography ==
According to the United States Census Bureau, the township had a total area of 21.98 square miles (56.93 km^{2}), including 20.85 square miles (54.01 km^{2}) of land and 1.13 square miles (2.93 km^{2}) of water (5.14%).

Kenvil (2020 Census population of 1,806), Landing (4,296), Ledgewood (4.903), Lower Berkshire Valley (617), Port Morris (754), and Succasunna (10,338) are unincorporated communities and census-designated places (CDPs) within the township. Previously, as of the 2000 United States census, the Succasunna and Kenvil communities had been consolidated as Succasunna-Kenvil, which had a 2000 Census population of 12,569.

Other unincorporated communities, localities and place names located partially or completely within the township include Baker Mill Pond, Bertrand Island, Carys, Lake Junction, Lake Rogerene, Port Morris Landing, Rustic and Shippenport.

Roxbury borders the municipalities of Chester Township, Jefferson Township, Mine Hill Township, Mount Arlington, Mount Olive Township, Netcong, Randolph Township, Wharton in Morris County; and both Hopatcong and Stanhope in Sussex County.

== Demographics ==
Historical population
Census	Pop.	Note	%±
1810	1,563	*	—
1820	1,792		14.7%
1830	2,262		26.2%
1840	2,231		−1.4%
1850	2,269		1.7%
1860	2,865		26.3%
1870	3,320		15.9%
1880	2,139	*	−35.6%
1890	2,739		28.1%
1900	2,185	*	−20.2%
1910	2,414		10.5%
1920	2,976		23.3%
1930	3,879		30.3%
1940	4,455		14.8%
1950	5,707		28.1%
1960	9,983		74.9%
1970	15,754		57.8%
1980	18,878		19.8%
1990	20,429		8.2%
2000	23,883		16.9%
2010	23,324		−2.3%
2020	22,950		−1.6%
2023 (est.)	23,205		1.1%
Population sources: 1810–1920 1840 1850–1870; 1850 1870 1880–1890; 1890–1910 1910–1930; 1940–2000 2000; 2010 2020 * = Lost territory in previous decade.

=== 2020 census ===
Roxbury township, Morris County, New Jersey – Racial and Ethnic Composition (NH = Non-Hispanic) Note: the US Census treats Hispanic/Latino as an ethnic category. This table excludes Latinos from the racial categories and assigns them to a separate category. Hispanics/Latinos may be of any race.
Race / Ethnicity	Pop 2010	Pop 2020	% 2010	% 2020
White alone (NH)	19,041	16,865	81.64%	73.49%
Black or African American alone (NH)	496	647	2.13%	2.82%
Native American or Alaska Native alone (NH)	6	8	0.03%	0.03%
Asian alone (NH)	1,330	1,292	5.70%	5.63%
Pacific Islander alone (NH)	3	2	0.01%	0.01%
Some Other Race alone (NH)	29	109	0.12%	0.47%
Mixed Race/Multi-Racial (NH)	336	687	1.44%	2.99%
Hispanic or Latino (any race)	2,083	3,340	8.93%	14.55%
Total	23,324	22,950	100.00%	100.00%

=== 2010 census ===
The 2010 United States census counted 23,324 people, 8,292 households, and 6,484 families in the township. The population density was 1,119.9 per square mile (432.4/km^{2}). There were 8,582 housing units at an average density of 412.1 per square mile (159.1/km^{2}). The racial makeup was 88.21% (20,573) White, 2.34% (546) Black or African American, 0.09% (22) Native American, 5.77% (1,346) Asian, 0.05% (12) Pacific Islander, 1.55% (362) from other races, and 1.99% (463) from two or more races. Hispanic or Latino of any race were 8.93% (2,083) of the population.

Of the 8,292 households, 36.0% had children under the age of 18; 65.6% were married couples living together; 9.3% had a female householder with no husband present and 21.8% were non-families. Of all households, 18.2% were made up of individuals and 8.0% had someone living alone who was 65 years of age or older. The average household size was 2.80 and the average family size was 3.19.

24.6% of the population were under the age of 18, 6.8% from 18 to 24, 23.6% from 25 to 44, 32.4% from 45 to 64, and 12.6% who were 65 years of age or older. The median age was 41.9 years. For every 100 females, the population had 95.8 males. For every 100 females ages 18 and older there were 92.5 males.

The Census Bureau's 2006–2010 American Community Survey showed that (in 2010 inflation-adjusted dollars) median household income was $95,676 (with a margin of error of +/− $5,626) and the median family income was $110,538 (+/− $6,156). Males had a median income of $75,417 (+/− $7,299) versus $47,556 (+/− $4,775) for females. The per capita income for the borough was $38,576 (+/− $2,305). About 2.5% of families and 3.6% of the population were below the poverty line, including 4.0% of those under age 18 and 5.2% of those age 65 or over.

=== 2000 census ===
As of the 2000 United States census there were 23,883 people, 8,364 households, and 6,532 families residing in the township. The population density was 1,117.4 inhabitants per square mile (431.4/km^{2}). There were 8,550 housing units at an average density of 400.0 per square mile (154.4/km^{2}). The racial makeup of the township was 92.57% White, 1.91% Black or African American, 0.15% Native American, 3.58% Asian, 0.07% Pacific Islander, 0.68% from other races, and 1.04% from two or more races. 4.83% of the population were Hispanic or Latino of any race.

There were 8,364 households, out of which 39.7% had children under the age of 18 living with them, 66.8% were married couples living together, 8.7% had a female householder with no husband present, and 21.9% were non-families. 17.9% of all households were made up of individuals, and 6.5% had someone living alone who was 65 years of age or older. The average household size was 2.84 and the average family size was 3.25.

In the township the population was spread out, with 27.0% under the age of 18, 6.1% from 18 to 24, 31.4% from 25 to 44, 25.7% from 45 to 64, and 9.9% who were 65 years of age or older. The median age was 38 years. For every 100 females, there were 95.6 males. For every 100 females age 18 and over, there were 92.0 males.

The median income for a household in the township was $72,982, and the median income for a family was $83,409. Males had a median income of $59,488 versus $36,353 for females. The per capita income for the township was $30,174. About 2.1% of families and 2.7% of the population were below the poverty line, including 2.2% of those under age 18 and 3.1% of those age 65 or over.

=== Crime ===
According to the 2008 New Jersey State Police Uniform Crime Report, crime had declined in Roxbury versus 2007 data. There was an uptick in crime for 2009.

Crime for 2009 (Source: FBI)
Population	Violent crime	Murder and non-negligent man-slaughter	Forcible rape	Robbery	Aggravated assault	Property crime	Burglary	Larceny-theft	Motor vehicle theft	Arson
23,311	17	0	3	3	11	299	56	230	13	0

== Economy ==
Ledgewood Mall (with a gross leasable area of 518,246 square feet (48,146.6 m^{2})) and Roxbury Mall (with a GLA of 706,000 square feet (65,600 m^{2})) are regional shopping malls located within the township.

== Government ==
=== Local government ===
Roxbury operates under the Council-Manager form of Government under the Faulkner Act. The township is one of 42 municipalities (of the 564) statewide that use this form of government. The Township Council is comprised of seven elected officials, with three seats elected from the entire township at-large and one elected from each of the four wards. Council members are elected for four-year terms on a staggered basis in partisan elections held in odd-numbered years, with the three at-large seats selected together and the four ward seats up for election at the same time two years later. The mayor and deputy mayor are chosen from within the council by the members of the council at a reorganization meeting held each year during the first week in January to serve one-year terms of office. The manager is responsible for the day-to-day operations associated with all municipal activities. The manager directs, administers and coordinates the activities of the municipality in full support of policies, goals and objectives established by the governing body.

As of April 2025, the members of Roxbury's Township Council are:

- Mayor Shawn Potillo (R, Ward 1, Term expires December 31, 2027, Mayoral term expires at time of annual reorganization meeting first week of January 2026);
- Deputy Mayor Mark Crowley (R, Councilman-at-Large, Term expires December 31, 2027, Deputy Mayoral term expires at time of annual reorganization meeting first week of January 2026);
- James "Jim" Rilee (R, Councilman-at-Large, Term expires December 31, 2025);
- Robert "Bob" DeFillippo (R, Councilman-at-Large, Term expires December 31, 2025);
- Jacqueline "Jaki" Albrect (R, Ward 2, Term expires December 31, 2027);
- Thomas "Tom" Carey (R, Ward 4, Term expires December 31, 2027), and
- Fred Hall (R, Ward 3, Term expires December 31, 2025).

In April 2021, the Township Council selected Shawn Potillo from a list of three candidates submitted by the Republican municipal committee to the fill the Ward 1 council seat expiring in December 2022 that had been held by Richard Zoschak until his death the previous month. Potillo served on an interim basis until the November 2021 general election, when he was elected to serve the balance of the term of office. Two years later, November 7, 2023, Mayor Potillo was re-elected to a full, four-year term.

==== Roxbury Mount Arlington Study Commission ====
In March 2014, members of the public petitioned the New Jersey Department of Community Affairs to form the Roxbury Mount Arlington Study Commission to consider a possible consolidation of Roxbury and the neighboring municipality of Mount Arlington. In March 2015, the commission was formed with five members and two alternates from each municipality. If the commission votes to recommend a merger, the decision would have to be ratified by a referendum of the voters in each community.

=== Federal, state and county representation ===
Roxbury is located in the 7th Congressional District and is part of New Jersey's 24th state legislative district.

For the 119th United States Congress, New Jersey's 7th congressional district is represented by Thomas Kean Jr. (R, Westfield). New Jersey is represented in the United States Senate by Democrats Cory Booker (Newark, term ends 2027) and Andy Kim (Moorestown, term ends 2031).

For the 2026–2027 session, the 24th legislative district of the New Jersey Legislature is represented in the State Senate by Parker Space (R, Wantage Township) and in the General Assembly by Dawn Fantasia (R, Franklin) and Mike Inganamort (R, Chester Township).

Morris County is governed by a Board of County Commissioners comprised of seven members who are elected at-large in partisan elections to three-year terms on a staggered basis, with either one or three seats up for election each year as part of the November general election. Actual day-to-day operation of departments is supervised by County Administrator Deena Leary.

As of 2026, Morris County's Commissioners (with all terms ending December 31) are Director Stephen H. Shaw (R, Mountain Lakes, 2027), Deputy Director John Krickus (R, Washington Township, 2027), Douglas Cabana (R, Boonton Township, 2028), Thomas J. Mastrangelo (R, Montville, 2028), Christine Myers (R, Harding Township, 2028), Tayfun Selen (R, Chatham Township, 2026), and Deborah Smith (R, Denville Township, 2027).

The county's constitutional officers are County Clerk Ann F. Grossi (R, Parsippany–Troy Hills, 2028), Sheriff James M. Gannon (R, Boonton Township, 2025) and Surrogate Heather Darling (R, Roxbury, 2029).

=== Politics ===
United States presidential election results for Roxbury 2024 2020 2016 2012 2008 2004
Year	Republican		Democratic		Third party(ies)	
Year	No.	%	No.	%	No.	%
2024	7,977	57.25%	5,734	41.15%	222	1.59%
2020	7,921	54.38%	6,449	44.27%	196	1.35%
2016	7,300	59.00%	4,626	37.39%	447	3.61%
2012	6,536	59.86%	4,282	39.22%	100	0.92%
2008	7,182	58.65%	4,952	40.44%	112	0.91%
2004	7,270	61.64%	4,411	37.40%	113	0.96%

As of March 2011, there were a total of 15,471 registered voters in Roxbury, of which 3,010 (19.5%) were registered as Democrats, 5,307 (34.3%) were registered as Republicans and 7,145 (46.2%) were registered as Unaffiliated. There were 9 voters registered as Libertarians or Greens.

In the 2012 presidential election, Republican Mitt Romney received 59.9% of the vote (6,536 cast), ahead of Democrat Barack Obama with 39.2% (4,282 votes), and other candidates with 0.9% (100 votes), among the 10,996 ballots cast by the township's 16,262 registered voters (78 ballots were spoiled), for a turnout of 67.6%. In the 2008 presidential election, Republican John McCain received 58.3% of the vote (7,182 cast), ahead of Democrat Barack Obama with 40.2% (4,952 votes) and other candidates with 0.9% (112 votes), among the 12,321 ballots cast by the township's 15,934 registered voters, for a turnout of 77.3%. In the 2004 presidential election, Republican George W. Bush received 61.5% of the vote (7,270 ballots cast), outpolling Democrat John Kerry with 37.3% (4,411 votes) and other candidates with 0.7% (113 votes), among the 11,816 ballots cast by the township's 15,469 registered voters, for a turnout percentage of 76.4.

Gubernatorial election results for Roxbury
Year	Republican		Democratic		Third party(ies)	
Year	No.	%	No.	%	No.	%
2025	6,088	55.08%	4,909	44.41%	56	0.51%
2021	5,687	62.42%	3,359	36.87%	65	0.71%
2017	4,279	61.38%	2,545	36.51%	147	2.11%
2013	4,996	69.91%	1,996	27.93%	154	2.16%
2009	5,306	65.68%	2,081	25.76%	691	8.55%
2005	4,251	59.09%	2,662	37.00%	281	3.91%

In the 2013 gubernatorial election, Republican Chris Christie received 69.9% of the vote (4,996 cast), ahead of Democrat Barbara Buono with 27.9% (1,996 votes), and other candidates with 2.2% (154 votes), among the 7,267 ballots cast by the township's 16,060 registered voters (121 ballots were spoiled), for a turnout of 45.2%. In the 2009 gubernatorial election, Republican Chris Christie received 65.3% of the vote (5,306 ballots cast), ahead of Democrat Jon Corzine with 25.6% (2,081 votes), Independent Chris Daggett with 8.0% (646 votes) and other candidates with 0.6% (45 votes), among the 8,120 ballots cast by the township's 15,686 registered voters, yielding a 51.8% turnout.

United States Senate election results for Roxbury1
Year	Republican		Democratic		Third party(ies)	
Year	No.	%	No.	%	No.	%
2024	7,346	56.44%	5,407	41.54%	263	2.02%
2018	6,118	60.70%	3,645	36.16%	316	3.14%
2012	5,836	59.09%	3,941	39.90%	99	1.00%
2006	4,213	59.92%	2,633	37.45%	185	2.63%

United States Senate election results for Roxbury2
Year	Republican		Democratic		Third party(ies)	
Year	No.	%	No.	%	No.	%
2020	7,881	55.50%	6,130	43.17%	190	1.34%
2014	3,276	60.14%	2,077	38.13%	94	1.73%
2013	2,834	62.18%	1,667	36.57%	57	1.25%
2008	6,545	60.01%	4,141	37.97%	220	2.02%

Mike Hayes of Gothamist wrote that after Immigration and Customs Enforcement acquired a warehouse in 2026 with the intention of using it for detaining people, support for the GOP had declined in Roxbury.

== Education ==
The Roxbury School District serves public school students in pre-kindergarten through twelfth grade. As of the 2023–24 school year, the district, comprised of seven schools, had an enrollment of 3,389 students and 316.6 classroom teachers (on an FTE basis), for a student–teacher ratio of 10.7:1. Schools in the district consists of the following (with 2023–24 enrollment data from the National Center for Education Statistics) are Franklin Elementary School with 294 students in grades K–4, Jefferson Elementary School with 351 students in grades PreK–4, Kennedy Elementary School with 255 students in grades K–4, Nixon Elementary School with 245 students in grades K–4, Lincoln / Roosevelt School with 506 students in grades 5–6, Eisenhower Middle School with 525 students in grades 7–8 and Roxbury High School with 1,171 students in grades 9–12.

The district's high school also serves students from Mount Arlington, who attend as part of a sending/receiving relationship; there were 160 students sent from Mount Arlington in 2023–24.

Established in 1963, St. Therese School is a Catholic school operated under the auspices of the Roman Catholic Diocese of Paterson.

== Transportation ==
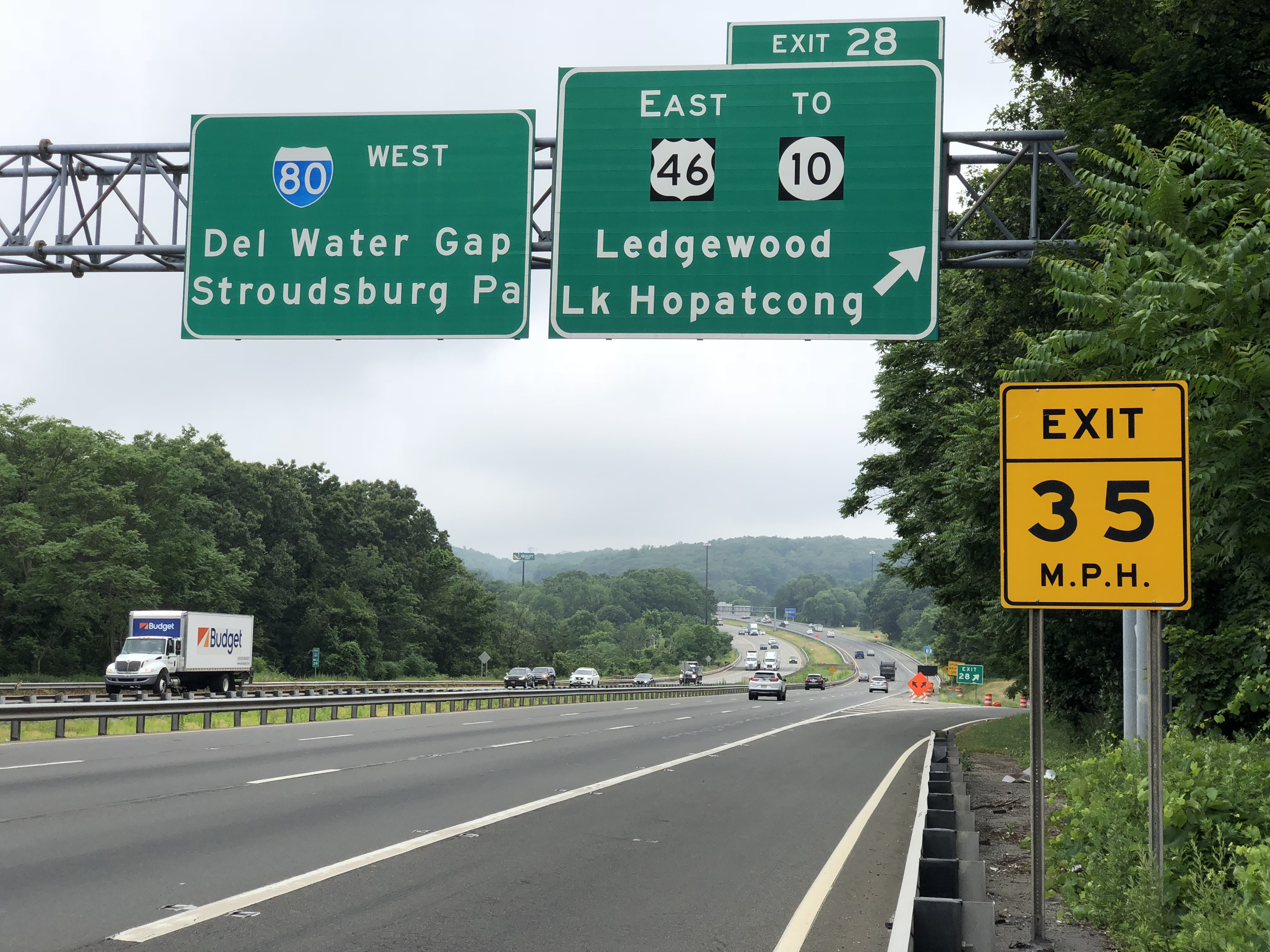
Interstate 80 westbound in Roxbury

=== Roads and highways ===
As of May 2010, the township had a total of 133.66 miles (215.10 km) of roadways, of which 107.03 miles (172.25 km) were maintained by the municipality, 13.91 miles (22.39 km) by Morris County and 12.72 miles (20.47 km) by the New Jersey Department of Transportation.

Interstate 80, U.S. Route 46, U.S. Route 206, Route 10 and Route 183 all pass through the township.

=== Public transportation ===
The NJ Transit Lake Hopatcong station is served by the Morris & Essex Lines and the Montclair-Boonton Line, with service to Hoboken Terminal or to Pennsylvania Station in Midtown Manhattan via Midtown Direct which requires a transfer at Dover or Montclair State University.

Morristown & Erie Railway's Chester Branch and High Bridge Branch freight lines run through the township on weekdays.

Port Morris was the starting point for the Lackawanna Cut-Off, an engineering marvel constructed by the Delaware, Lackawanna and Western Railroad between 1908 and 1911. NJ Transit is considering plans to restore passenger service on the route between the Pocono Mountains in Pennsylvania and Hoboken Terminal.

NJ Transit provides limited local bus service on the 875 route between the Ledgewood Mall, Dover and Morristown.

Lakeland Bus Lines stops in the Landing section of the township providing service to and from the Port Authority Bus Terminal in Midtown Manhattan.

== In popular culture ==
Tom's Diner was featured in the music video from Time After Time by Cyndi Lauper. Constructed in the 1940s, the long-derelict diner was demolished in 2021.

== Notable people ==
People who were born in, residents of, or otherwise closely associated with Roxbury include:

- Trevor Baptiste (born 1996), professional lacrosse midfielder for the Boston Cannons
- Dylan Castanheira (born 1995), soccer player who plays as a goalkeeper for Fort Lauderdale CF in USL League One
- Harry "A" Chesler (1898–1981), entrepreneur behind the first comic book "packager" of the late-1930s to 1940s Golden Age of Comic Books, supplying comics features and complete comic books to publishers testing the waters of the emerging medium
- BettyLou DeCroce (born 1952), politician who has represented the 26th Legislative District in the New Jersey General Assembly from 2012 to 2022, after being appointed to fill the seat following the death of her husband, Alex DeCroce
- Philemon Dickerson (1788–1862), 12th Governor of New Jersey
- Roberta Groner (born 1978), athlete competing in long-distance events
- Leo Warren Jenkins (1913–1989), educator who served as the sixth president and chancellor of what is now East Carolina University
- Doug Miller (born 1969), soccer player and coach
- Paige Monaghan (born 1996), professional soccer player who currently plays for Sky Blue FC of the National Women's Soccer League
- Dave Moore (born 1969), football player who played for the Buffalo Bills, Miami Dolphins and Tampa Bay Buccaneers
- Karen Ann Quinlan (1954–1985), important figure in the history of the right to die controversy in the United States
- Jetur R. Riggs (1809–1869), represented New Jersey's 4th congressional district in the U.S. representative from 1859 to 1861
- Tito Santana (born 1953), former WWF wrestler
