= Lakeland Bus Lines =

Bus company in New Jersey

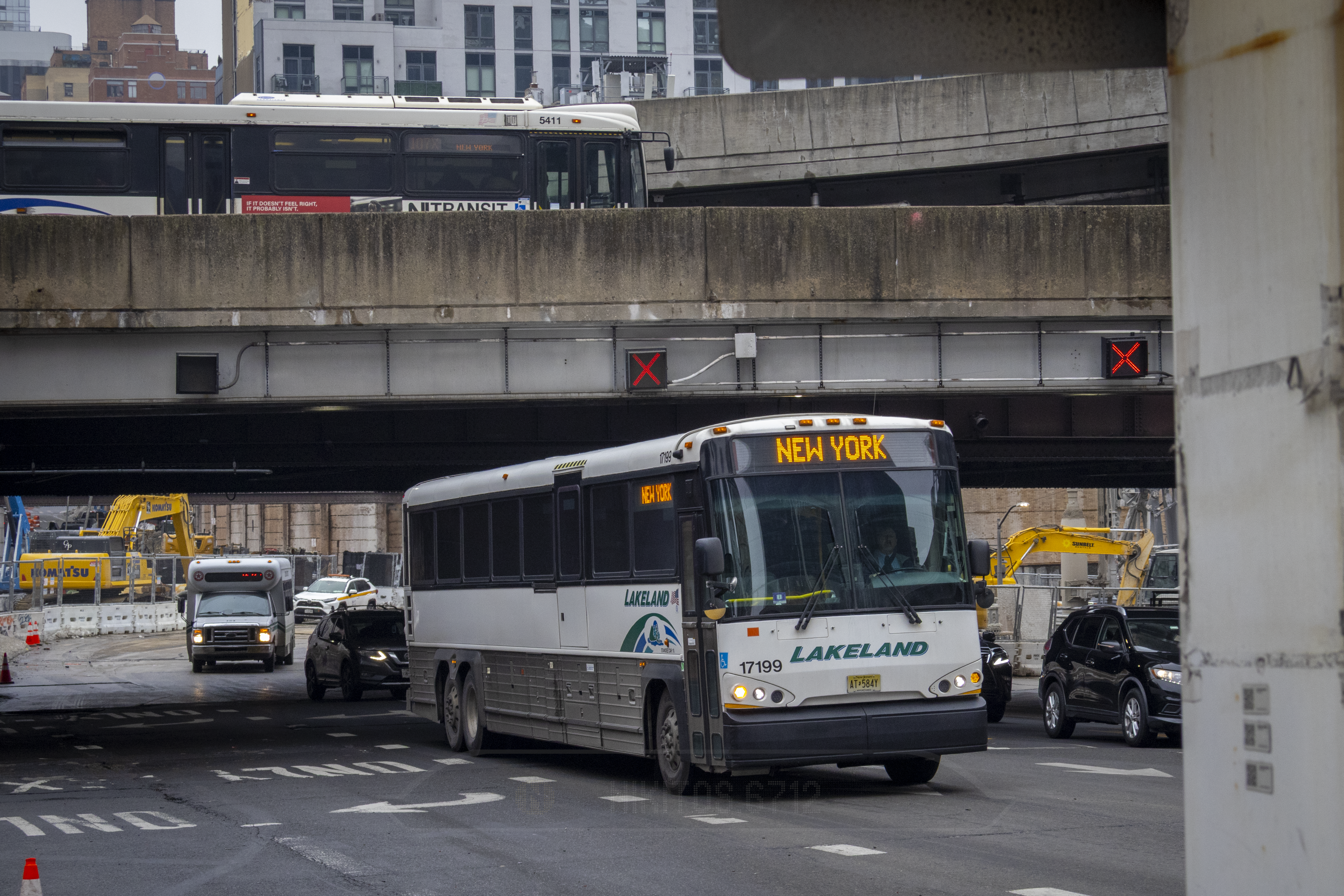
- A Lakeland 2017 MCI is seen heading to NY Port Authority Bus Terminal to drop off passengers.
- Founded: 1952
- Headquarters: 425 E. Blackwell St; Dover, NJ 07801
- Locale: Northwestern New Jersey
- Service area: Morris, Sussex, Somerset, and Union Counties, NJ
- Service type: Line run and charter services
- Routes: 5
- Fleet: 68
- Website: Lakeland Bus Lines

Lakeland Bus Lines, Inc is a bus company located in Dover, New Jersey. Lakeland operates commuter routes from Morris, Sussex, Somerset and Essex Counties, New Jersey to New York City.

== Routes ==
Lakeland Bus Lines provides service along three routes, each named for the corridor on which it travels.

=== Commuter routes ===
Route	New York Terminal	Via	New Jersey Terminal
46	Port Authority Bus Terminal; Midtown Manhattan	US 46; CR 513	Mount Arlington
46	Port Authority Bus Terminal; Midtown Manhattan	US 46; CR 513	Dover
80 (rush hours only, peak direction)	Port Authority Bus Terminal; Midtown Manhattan	I-80	Mount Arlington
80 (rush hours only, peak direction)	Port Authority Bus Terminal; Midtown Manhattan	I-80; NJ 183	Stanhope
80 (rush hours only, peak direction)	Port Authority Bus Terminal; Midtown Manhattan	I-80; NJ 15	Sparta
80 (rush hours only, peak direction)	Port Authority Bus Terminal; Midtown Manhattan	I-80; US 206	Newton
78 (rush hours only, peak direction)	Port Authority Bus Terminal; Midtown Manhattan	I-78; CR 512; US 202	Bernardsville
Downtown (rush hours only, peak direction)	Wall Street; Lower Manhattan	I-80; US 46	Mount Arlington

=== Casino Line Service ===
Lakeland Bus Lines provides service along routes for day or overnight trips to Atlantic City Casinos, Mount Airy Casino Resort in Mount Pocono, Pennsylvania, and Wind Creek Bethlehem in Bethlehem, Pennsylvania.

Line	North Jersey Terminal	Via	Casino Terminal
Atlantic City (Fridays, Saturdays, and Sundays Only)	Sparta	Jefferson, Rockaway Mall, Parsippany, Route 280, Garden State Parkway, Atlantic City Expressway	Bally's or Harrah's
Mount Airy Casino Resort (Saturdays through Mondays only)	Parsippany	Dover, Rockaway Mall, Mount Arlington, Netcong, Hackettstown, Interstate 80	Mount Airy Casino Resort
Wind Creek Bethlehem (Wednesdays and Fridays only)	Parsippany	Dover, Rockaway Mall, Mount Arlington, Netcong, Hackettstown, Interstate 80	Wind Creek Bethlehem

== Fleet ==
Lakeland has a fleet of 56 buses entirely equipped with apportioned registration plates. Most of the fleet features MCI D4500CT models designated for commuter routes. The other part of the fleet has various models manufactured by MCI, Prevost, and Van Hool, which are designated for chartered tours.
