= Susan Sweney =

British WWII radio broadcaster (1915–1983)

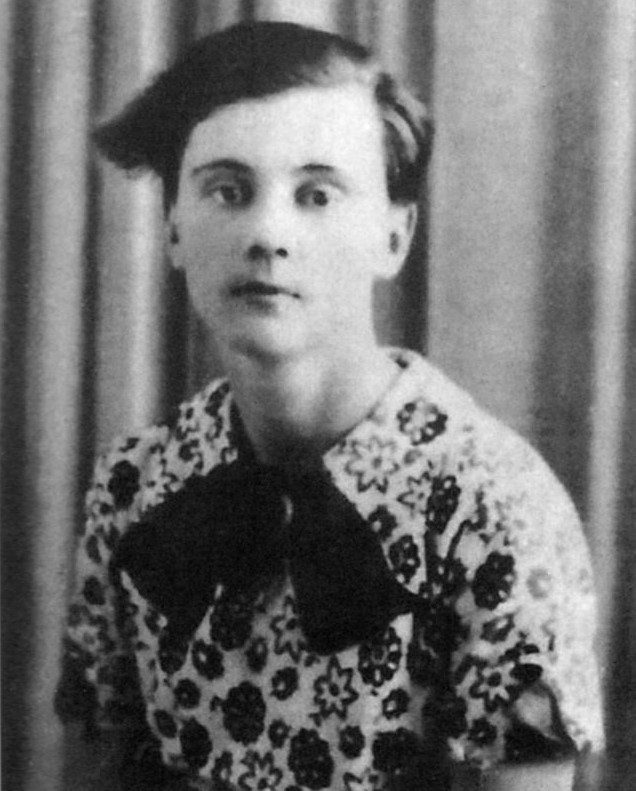
- Sweney in 1936
- Born: Susan Dorothea Mary Therese Sweney; 2 February 1915; Trichinopoly, British India
- Died: 30 October 1983 (aged 68); Surrey, England
- Occupations: Journalist, broadcaster
- Known for: Propaganda broadcasts from Nazi Germany

Susan Dorothea Mary Therese Hilton (née Sweney, 2 February 1915 – 30 October 1983) was a British radio broadcaster for the Nazi regime in Germany during the Second World War.

Born in India to a family with Irish connections, she was active in the British Union of Fascists in the 1930s before attracting the interest of the police in London after which she set off to join her husband in Burma. Her ship was sunk in the Indian Ocean by a German raider, and she was sent with other survivors to France. That ship too was attacked and sunk, this time by a British submarine off the coast of France, and she was again rescued, causing her to describe herself as "many times drowned".

She began to work as a journalist in Paris before moving to Berlin to make propaganda broadcasts in support of the Nazi regime. She had an intense and probably lesbian relationship there with a colleague, but also suffered from loneliness and depression. She gambled and drank as much as she could, leading to on-air mistakes for which she was dismissed. In Vienna in 1943–44, she worked for the Schutzstaffel (SS), watching Americans and Germans suspected of spying for the Allies. She came under suspicion by the Gestapo and was arrested but released and sent to Liebenau internment camp, probably at her own request. She was returned to Britain by MI5 where she was tried at the Old Bailey for assisting the enemy and jailed for 18 months. On release she worked as an international courier and later for a farm and pet shop business.

== Early life ==
Susan Sweney was born in Trichinopoly (now Tiruchirappalli), British India, on 2 February 1915 to British parents with Irish connections. Her father was Cyril Edward Sweney, a superintendent of railway police in Madras. Her mother was Dorothy Sweney, née Tower-Barter, who was born in Madras. She had a brother, Edward, who was born in India and became a poultry farmer in Meath, Ireland. She was educated partly in England where her brother said that she had received "rough treatment" that had disillusioned her about the British class system and may have influenced her political views.

In 1936, Sweney married the Scottish mining engineer George Martin Hilton. The couple had a son who died young. George Hilton later became a captain in the Royal Engineers and worked with the Special Operations Executive during the Second World War. His father was Lt. Col. George Hilton.

== Fascism ==
In 1936, Susan Sweney joined the British Union of Fascists (BUF) as she "believed in the Union's ideals". She described herself as an active member and, in October 1936, was charged at Bow Street Court with disorderly behaviour at 10 Downing Street. According to her husband, she attended the Nazi party conference at Munich in 1938 but she left the BUF that year over the party's policy towards Jews, not because the anti-Semitism troubled her, but, as she put it: "if the Jews were as powerful as alleged, then attacking them would only bring counter-attack". She moved to Dublin where she was monitored by the Irish police Special Branch.

By January 1940, she was back in London, and had rejoined the BUF. At the suggestion of Charlie Watts, BUF district leader Westminster St. George's branch, she took up the editorship of the fascist newspaper Voice of the People which she performed from January to May 1940 when the police Special Branch raided her flat and seized all her materials. She had already planned to give up the job for a quieter life as her young son had died which had affected her health and she had booked her passage to join her husband in Burma.

== Twice shipwrecked ==
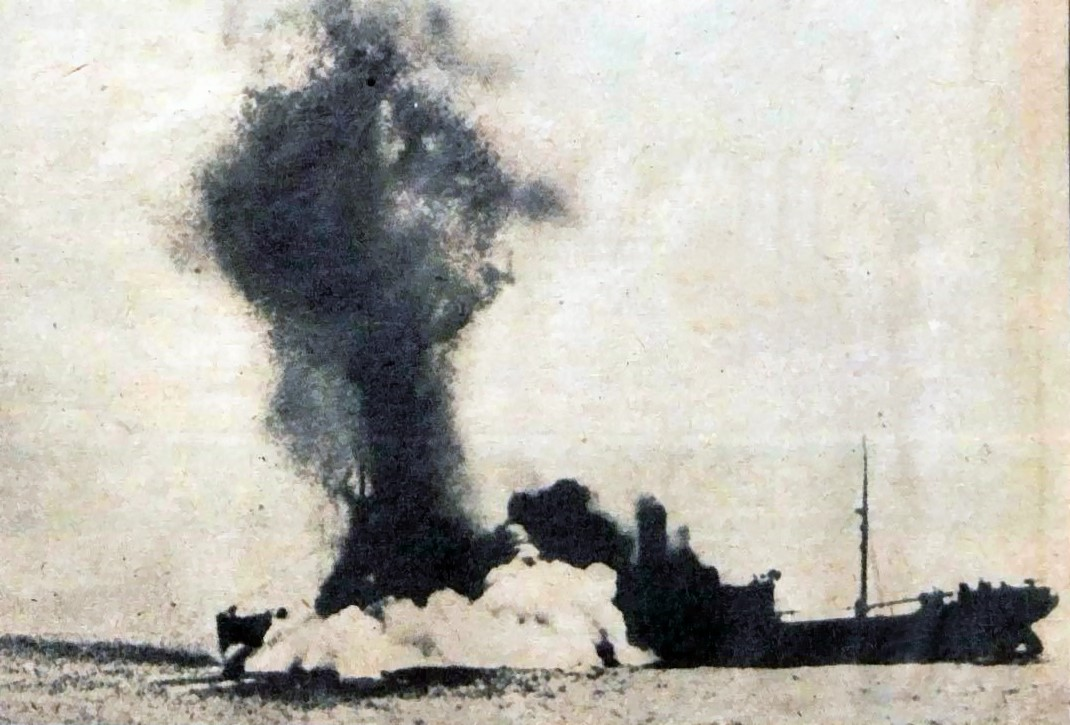
The destruction of the British ship Kemmendine by the German raider Atlantis, July 1940.

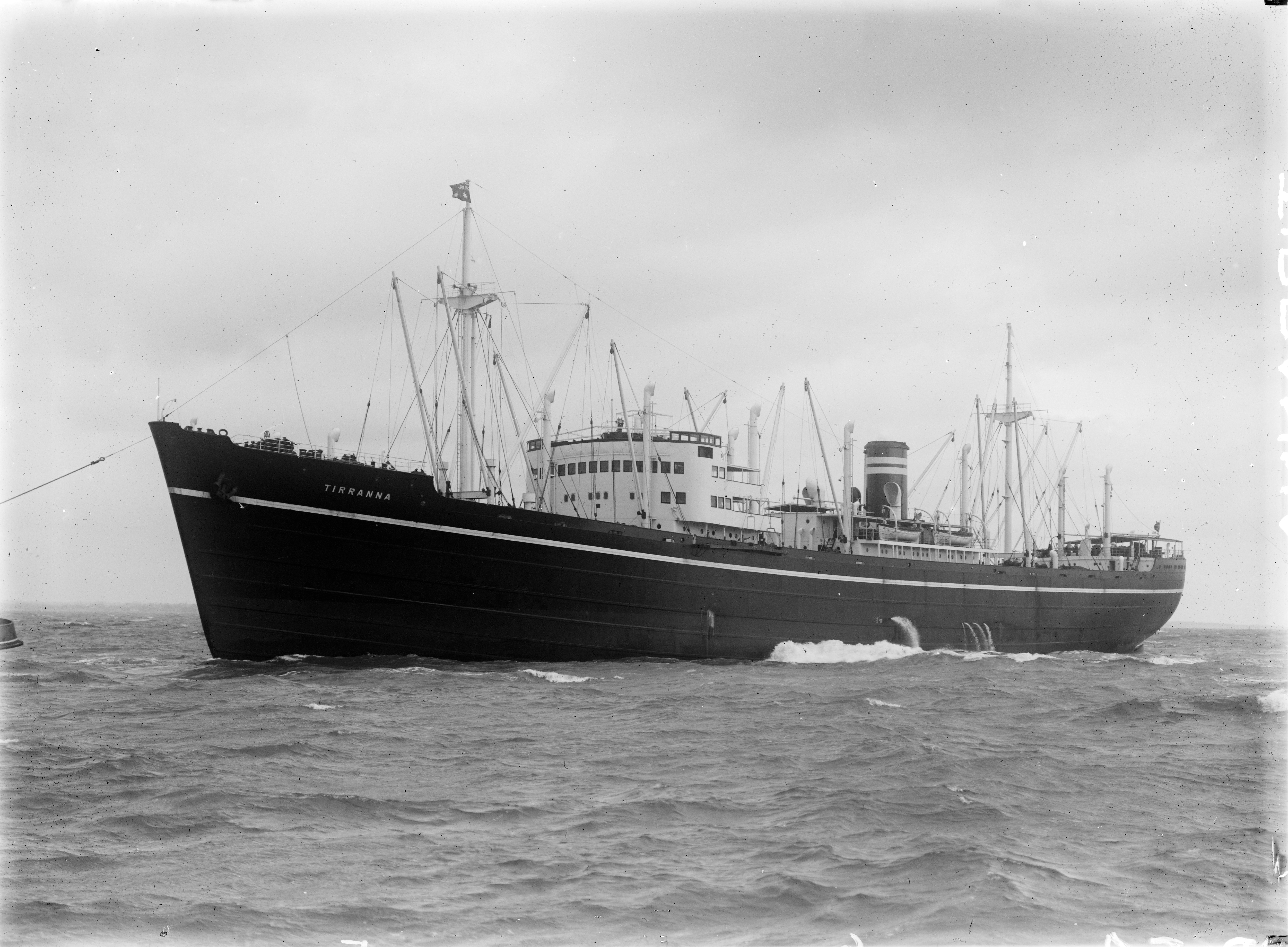
Norwegian ship Tirranna

Sweney departed for Burma on the Kemmendine on 28 May 1940 but the vessel was captured and then sunk by the German raider Atlantis in the Indian Ocean on 13 July 1940 with the crew and passengers evacuated to the Atlantis. Sweney acquired a reputation on the Atlantis for drinking and bad language, accusing the crew of being brutes, murderers, and many other things. They in turn nicknamed her "the devil's roast", the "D.R." and the "Plain Lady". The first officer, Ulrich Mohr, recalled in his memoirs that her particular complaint was that the ship's bartender had left his post and locked-up as soon as the ship came under fire, but that she could be calmed through the use of the ship's looted Scotch whisky. After she left the Atlantis, Mohr found correspondence on another captured ship that Sweney's husband George was suspected in Burma of spying for the Japanese.

She and the other survivors from the Kemmendine were transferred to the Norwegian Tirranna, another ship captured by the Atlantis, and sailed for France as a prize ship with a cargo of looted goods. According to Sweney, it was on the Tirranna that she became known to the Germans as Irish rather than British after she befriended the often intoxicated Thomas Cormac MacGowan, the 54-year-old Irish ship's doctor on the Kemmendine. On 22 September, however, the Tirranna was torpedoed off the coast of France by the British submarine Tuna and sank with 87 lives lost. The survivors were taken to a German naval facility in Royan, from where Sweney and MacGowan travelled to Paris in December 1940.

== Paris ==
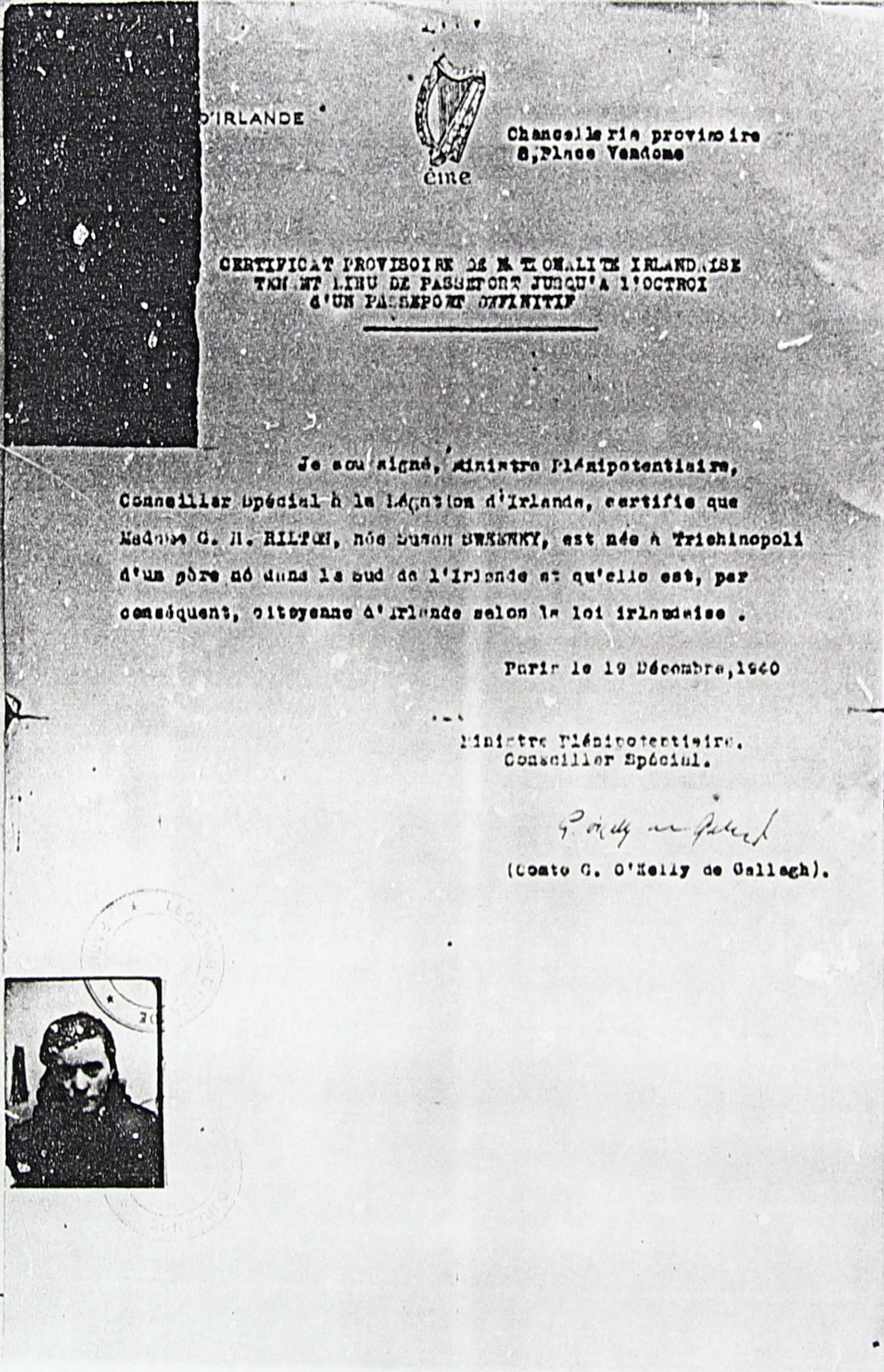
Sweney's temporary Irish identity document of 19 December 1940

In Paris, Sweney acquired a temporary Irish identity document and passport from the embassy there in December 1940, something issued to many who claimed Irish nationality in occupied Paris. Her British passport had been taken from her by the Germans before she arrived in France. She broadcast a descriptive account of her adventures for which the Germans paid her 500 Reichsmarks. This was intercepted by BBC Monitoring in April and May 1941 who summarised it as emphasising how well the passengers were treated by the German crew and how many lives were lost, particularly women and children, when the Tirranna was sunk by the British. Her broadcast was published in Hamburg in 1942 as "An Irish woman's experience of England and the war at sea", taking at face value Sweney's claim to be Irish rather than British.

Based at the Hotel d'Amerique in the rue Rochechouart, Paris, she began to work as a journalist and according to a contemporary, established very good relations with high-ranking German officers in the city. She later claimed to British intelligence to have helped the Irish priest father Kenneth Monaghan of the Chapelle Saint-Joseph to smuggle British merchant seamen out of Paris. Monaghan had been a British Army officer during the First World War and was a chaplain to the British Expeditionary Force in 1940 with connections to MI6. Sweney's story was supported by testimony gathered after the war from Miss Winifred Fitzpatrick, an Irish woman in Paris who knew Monaghan.

In June 1941, she was visited at her hotel by Abwehr agent Oscar C. Pfaus and the head of the Nazi propaganda organisation Deutscher Fichte-Bund, Theodore Kessemeir, to ask her to undertake undercover work on behalf of Germany. She was given money and identity papers under an alias and travelled to Berlin where the proposal of undercover work was again discussed. She understood it to involve travel to Ireland, the United States or Portuguese East Africa. She refused on the grounds that the work was too "dirty", but was given other work such as telephone intercepts and then visiting military installations as research for a propaganda book about German armed strength.

== Berlin ==
From September 1941, Sweney worked for Büro Concordia, an arm of the German foreign ministry that ran a string of "black" radio stations targeted at discontented minorities outside Germany. The stations aimed to give the impression that they were the work of internal dissidents broadcasting from within the target country rather than propaganda from abroad. She made broadcasts to Scotland as Ann Tower on Büro's Radio Caledonia. The name Ann was invented but Tower came from her mother, and she acquired a German passport in that name. She also prepared religious material for Büro's Christian Peace Movement station.

From January 1942, she worked at Irland-Redaktion, a semi-independent station on which she used her maiden name of Susan Sweney. Her work there consisted of writing talks for others, presenting her own talks three times a week which she admitted were "sheer propaganda" aimed at keeping Ireland neutral, and writing plays and reciting poetry that was broadcast to America. Her colleague there, Francis Stuart, described her as "a nice sort" but constantly seeking alcohol, an opinion shared by fellow colleague John O'Reilly.

In March 1942, she sent a letter to her brother Edward in Meath which she signed "your many times drowned sister, Susan". Edward never received it and the letter was read by the Gestapo, British intelligence, and the Irish G2, inadvertently tipping them off about her activities and leading G2 to open a file on her. Her brother was visited by a British representative, the poet John Betjeman, who was then doing war work in Dublin.

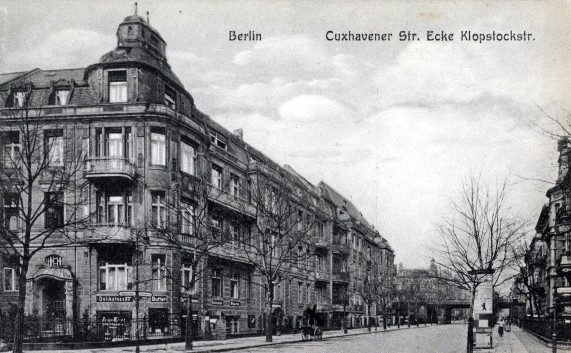
Cuxhavener Strasse and Klopstockstrasse, Berlin, where Sweney had an apartment with Sonja Kowanko

In May 1942, she wrote to Biddy O'Kelly, an Irish friend in Dublin, describing her work and asking how her broadcasts were received in Ireland, and whether she would she be able to show her face there after the war? She also asked for news of her husband whose fate she did not know, although he told his superiors in the British Army in 1944 that he had not been on friendly terms with his wife for some years. She spoke of enjoying smoking a pipe and socialising with Sophie Kowanko, a colleague on Irland-Redaktion who was known as Sonja. In June, she wrote again, saying:

Never have I felt so utterly homesick and shut away as I do now. Biddy, nothing can ever make up to me for these years of unbelieveable, soul-destroying loneliness. I try to shake these morbid thoughts off me. I go to the races and gamble as hard as I can. I work hard so as to forget.

She formed a close relationship with Kowanko who was born in 1916 and raised in Paris, the daughter of Russian émigrés. Educated in England and Italy and fluent in several languages, Kowanko was employed at Irland-Redaktion as a typist, but in practice had a larger role that included a weekly broadcast to Irish women under the name Linda Walters. The two women shared a flat in Berlin's Klopstockstrasse, and drank and played billiards together. Francis Stuart and his colleagues thought they were probably in a lesbian relationship. When Kowanko incurred the displeasure of the Gestapo and was transferred to factory work, Sweney lobbied to get Kowanko released and succeeded in getting her appointed to a six-month contract at the Nazi-owned Interradio at the end of 1942.

While many of Sweney's broadcasts were innocuous, and a diplomat from the Irish embassy in Paris found her as forthright off-air in her criticisms of the Germans as she was of the British, her need to earn money to buy alcohol helped her Nazi masters to control her. She was obliged to present whatever material she was given, which sometimes included anti-Semitic content such as her broadcast for Irland-Redaktion of 19 July 1942, picked up by the Irish Army, which used wild extrapolations from statistics to present a picture of an exploding Jewish population in the United States. Such material was not common in her broadcasting, however, as the management of the station resisted the constant stream of anti-Semitic material from the central propaganda pool, feeling that it was too crude for the audience. Instead, Irland-Redaktion concentrated on anti-war and anti-British material that emphasised the importance of Irish neutrality.

In July 1942, for instance, she broadcast:

Two years ago, I was myself taken in by Admiralty Churchill's lies, when he said that the British Navy had swept the seas of Nazi ships. Two years ago to-day, I suffered for my stupidity in the Indian Ocean. Let everybody learn from personal experience that Churchill is a liar. The immediate future is indeed black for Britain and her Allies, but it has been black all along – Only Churchill never admitted it.

She was sacked from Irland-Redaktion in autumn 1942 after making on-air mistakes, probably as a result of intoxication, but resurfaced in January 1943 at Interradio because "Sonja and I wanted to be together". She worked there until June 1943 writing scripts for others but not broadcasting. Kowanko returned to her family in Paris in mid-1943, where she lived until her death in 1993, and Sweney sent her money when she could.

Despite her drinking and wild nature, as a fluent English speaker and experienced radio presenter, Sweney was in demand by the Nazi propaganda machine. From January to October 1943, she worked for the German Foreign Office preparing talks titled Voice of the People. In 1943 and 1944 she also wrote anti-communist articles for Anti-Komintern. In mid-1943, she was asked to take a tour of the Reich's main cities to prepare an article for foreign consumption documenting the life of the Catholic Church, focusing particularly on churches damaged by Allied bombing to counter the Allied line that the church was being destroyed by the Nazi regime. However, she had begun to be followed by the Gestapo who, for reasons that are unknown, suspected her of being an Allied spy.

== Vienna ==
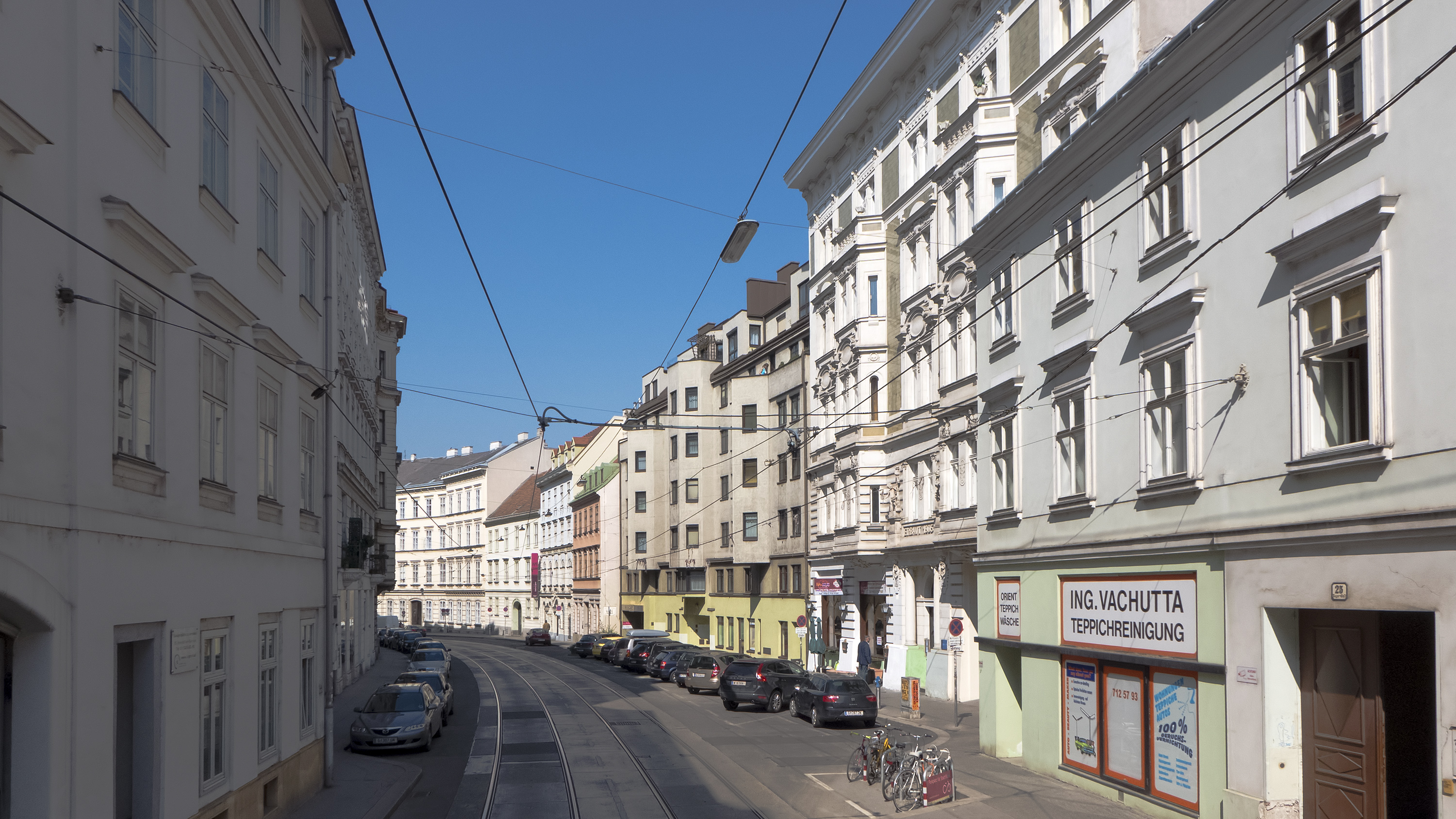
Ungargasse, Vienna, where Sweney stayed with Mrs Krimann.

In July 1943, Sweney was allowed to move to Vienna where the sculptor Lisa von Pott arranged for her to stay with Mrs Luze Krimann at her apartment at 71 Ungargasse. Krimann was a keen Nazi, at least until her Luftwaffe pilot husband Herbert Felix Krimann was grounded for being politically unreliable and then deserted in February 1945. She recalled that Sweney spent most of her time at the flat either typing for a magazine called Current Thoughts or asleep. She also made short broadcasts for Reichs-Rundfunk-Gesellschaft's Voice of the People series. She was permanently short of money and had "enormous" bills for cigarettes and alcohol. Krimann told British intelligence that Sweney claimed to have turned against the war but that she had no choice but to continue writing anti-British propaganda and that she knew that if Germany lost, she would have to account for her actions.

In October 1943, Sweney's work for the Foreign Office ceased, leaving her, as she put it, "stranded". She soon found employment however with what British intelligence called the "Von Pott Group", a group organised by Lisa von Pott to spy on anyone in Vienna suspected of helping the Allies. She was recruited by von Pott who asked her if she wanted to work against the communists and after Sweney said she was, introduced her to Dr Robert Wagner, an S.S. or S.D. officer who met Sweney weekly at 71 Ungargasse. She admitted spying on Doris Brehm, Count Leo Zeppelin, Dr Alphons Klingsland and his two sisters, and all the Americans in Vienna, but claimed to have tried to warn them that they were at risk and to have only done the work in the hope that it would enable her to escape to Yugoslavia. Her claims were refuted by statements collected by the British after liberation from witnesses who believed that she had denounced them to the SS or the Gestapo:

- Herbert P. Erdmann wrote to the British military authorities in June 1945 accusing Sweney of "high treason and espionage against England", saying that she had denounced him to the German secret police [the Gestapo] in June 1944 as an agent for the English.
- Alphons Klingsland, a leading Viennese lawyer, reported that in December 1943, Sweney visited him twice in his office and tried to engage his services. He refused as he felt she was suspicious. A report stated, "she tried as hard as she could to involve him in legal and other measures on her behalf, which were such as might easily have compromised him in the eyes of the Gestapo." Klingsland also said that he could construe nothing Sweney said as a warning. He was later denounced to the Gestapo by an unknown person.
- Felix Krimann, the deserter from the Luftwaffe, also claimed, to his wife, to have been denounced to the Gestapo by von Pott and Sweney, Sweney never having liked him.

Among von Pott's circle was Countess Amethé von Zeppelin, a British woman who had married Count Leo Zeppelin and was regarded by the British security services to have been anti-British since before the outbreak of the Second World War and to have made a propaganda or anti-British radio broadcast from Vienna on 21 September 1939 shortly after the outbreak of the war. Among Sweney's possessions was later found a visiting card from the countess containing a cryptic message in German that was translated as: "The bearer of this card also brings the bird with her. Herr FINDERS will have spoken to you about them already and will have left the cage and birdseed with you. Please give it (the bird) seed and water till to-morrow morning".

In 1944, Sweney visited the Turkish consulate in Vienna to try to obtain a visa to leave the Third Reich but when the Gestapo discovered her intentions they arrested her in July. Her friend, Margaret Schaffhauser, described her as being in the "condemned cell" in Vienna but that after she was reprieved, "a great calmness came over her there. She was no longer on the run".

== Internment ==
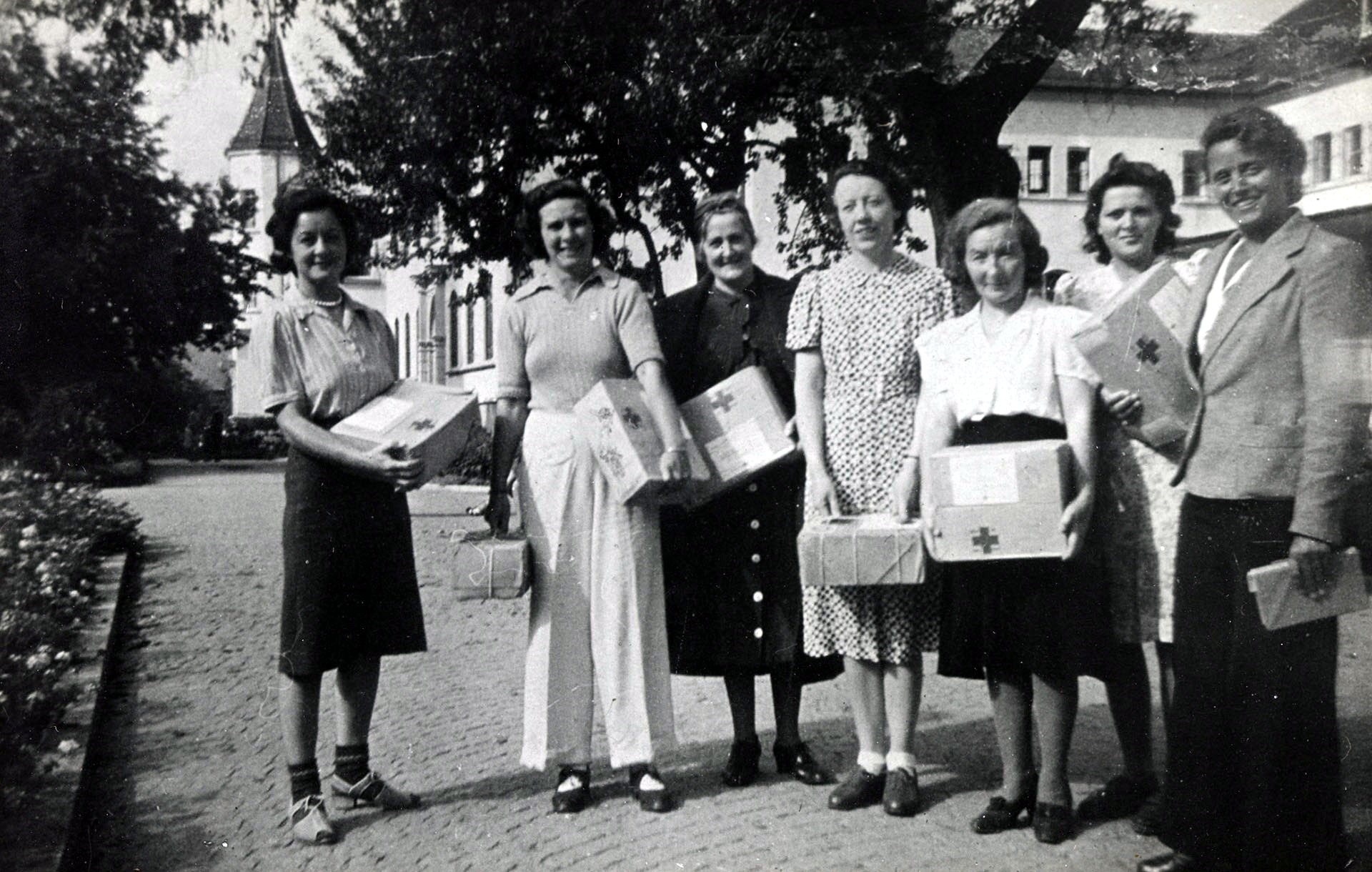
Propaganda photograph showing internees at Liebenau camp with Red Cross care packages, c.1940.

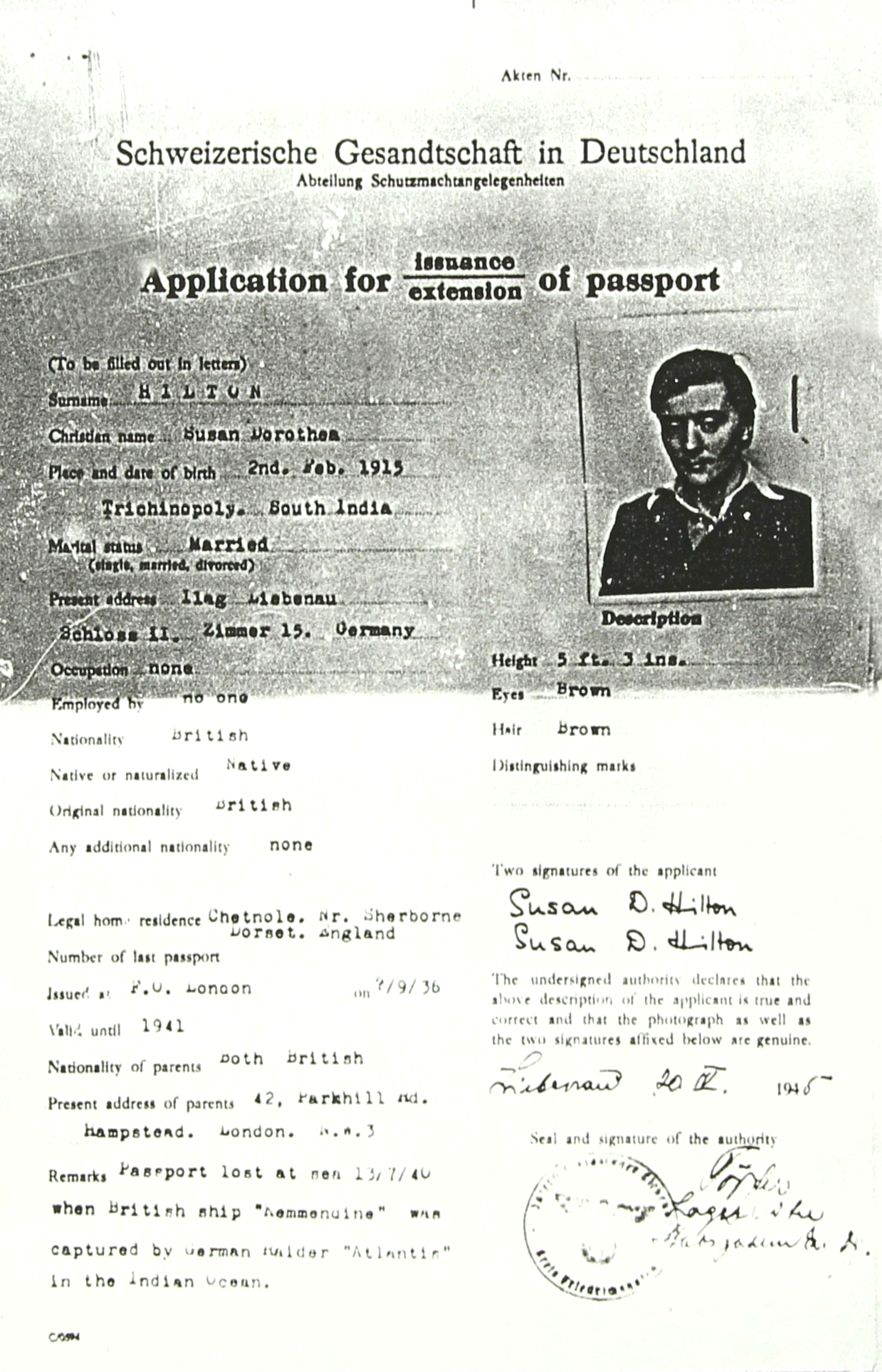
Sweney's application for a Swiss passport. Liebenau, 1945.

In August 1944, Sweney was sent to Liebenau internment camp for women and children in southern Germany, a former asylum whose patients had been killed by lethal injection on the orders of Adolf Hitler to make space for internees. In June 1945, she wrote to a pre-war friend of her experiences:

I have tried to get out and to send messages. Nothing worked so I fought my own little lone fight. Jim, these Germans are the most terrible people I have ever seen ... They are crooks. I got wise to them in France. I think that in my own way I have succeeded in causing them a lot of trouble as I sabotaged wherever I went. The result is that I was put in prison and my nerves are absolutely broken. I cannot travel in another ship and even an aeroplane scares me ... get us [Sweney and a friend from Liebenau] home to England or to a place where we can relax and feel no more fear. I have felt so intensely every moment of this war. Daily fear – hourly fear. Until I leave Germany I shall feel it pressing on my mind. I don't think you will recognise me when you see me.

Sweney was No. 29 on the British Renegades Warning List, a list developed by the British security services before the Normandy landings to enable Allied troops to identify people in occupied Europe who might try to subvert the invasion effort. After Liebenau was liberated she was held there for eight months while she was interrogated by MI5 while most of the other prisoners were released.

== Nationality ==
Before returning her to Britain, MI5 had to consider Sweney's nationality as she could not be said to have collaborated with the enemy if she was a citizen of a neutral country broadcasting to neutral countries.

In her statement, Sweney said that she thought that her father had been born in Ireland but she wasn't sure. She received a British passport in 1936 on the grounds that her husband was British but she lost it before her arrival in France. She was released from detention, unlike the other passengers from the Tirranna, and travelled to Paris where she obtained a temporary Irish identity document and passport, but the Germans replaced that with a Fremdenpass (foreigner's or alien's passport) when she arrived in Berlin. She tried to obtain new Irish papers but the Irish diplomats in Berlin told her that she had no claim to citizenship. In 1945, while she was interned, she applied for a Swiss passport but it is not known if it was issued.

== Arrest and trial ==
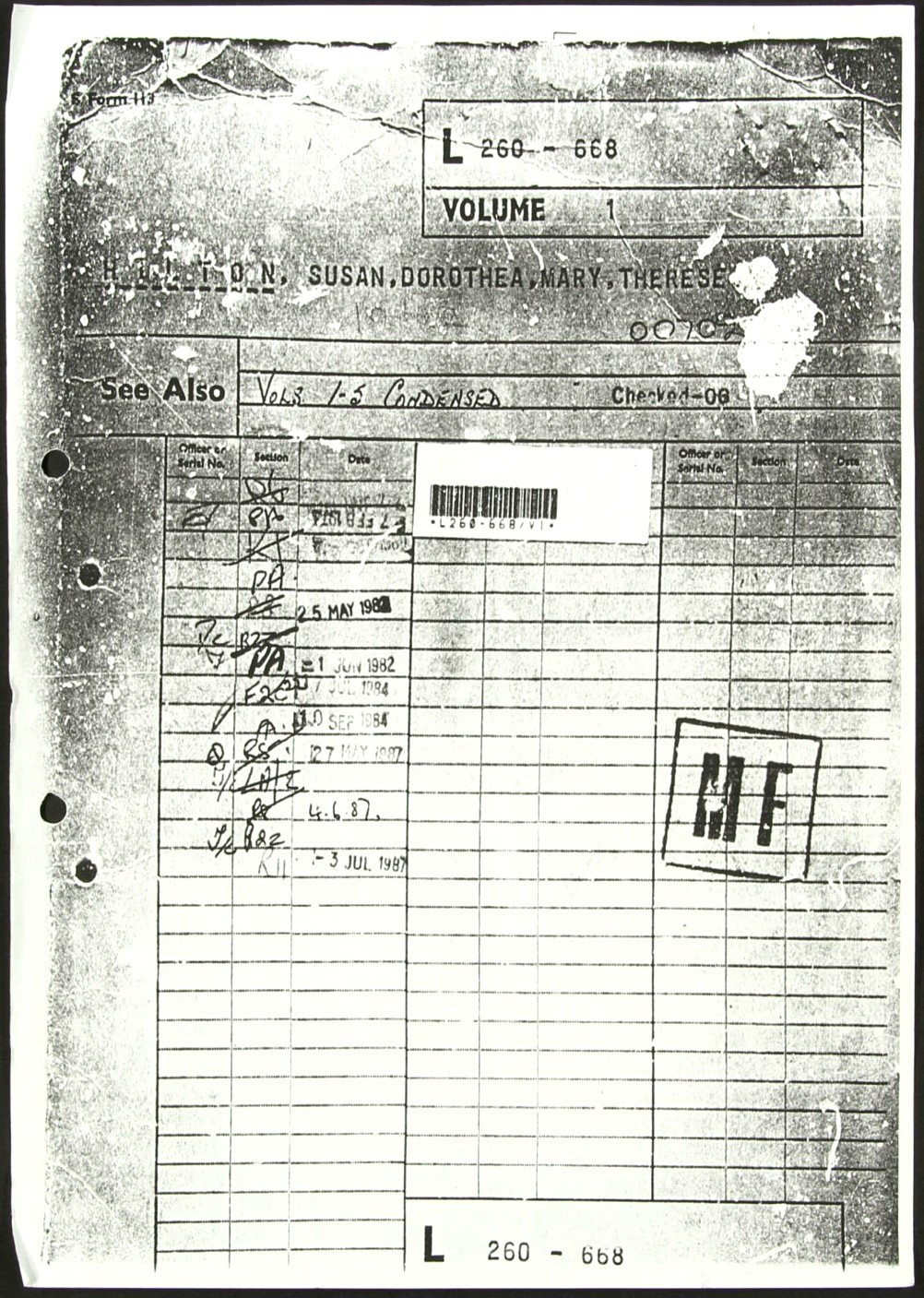
Sweney's British government file showing entries into the 1980s

Sweney was returned to Britain in December 1945 in the company of MI5 officer Iris Marsden who later recollected that Sweney's arm was in plaster and thought that she had been roughed-up by French soldiers. According to Marsden, Sweney was "devious" and the evidence against her "damning". She knew what she had done and was terrified of the consequences. She told Marsden that the internment camp had been "the safest place to be in the circumstances", confirming Mrs Krimann's statement that she had asked to be interned. Marsden told David O'Donoghue that Sweney had made sexual advances to her.

Sweney was arrested on arrival at Victoria Station in London and subsequently appeared at Bow Street Magistrates' Court charged with assisting the enemy by working for the German radio propaganda service. Her trial was on 18 February 1946 at the Central Criminal Court (the Old Bailey), when she faced ten charges of assisting the enemy. She pleaded guilty to eight and two that she denied were dropped. These were that she had joined the SS, and that she had conspired with others to broadcast propaganda. She received an 18-month jail sentence without hard labour.

The trial took less than a day, meaning that much of the background information about Sweney's life in Germany, such as that she had originally refused spying work and had been arrested by the Gestapo, was not mentioned. Her brother, Edward, later told David O'Donoghue that he felt the guilty plea and quick proceedings had deprived her of a fair trial and that his sister was only pursuing peace and was "innocent of any blameworthy act". Of her character, he said she was an "exhibitionist", "very immature and driven by fame", and "a person who needed a good deal of guidance. She was easily led, highly volatile, a very impressionable person, generous but hot-tempered".

Sweney herself later believed that the suspicions of the Gestapo, her short trial, the narrowing of the charges purely to broadcasting, and the soft treatment she received in Holloway prison (her "own room" and a "maid" to look after her) were indicative that she was being used to cover up other British espionage activity that had not come to light, possibly a British female agent who had been on the Kemmendine and left when it called at Gibraltar. According to her friend Margaret Schaffhauser, it was the only way she could explain the sequence of events.

== Later life ==
Sweney told Margaret Schaffhauser that when she left prison, she was met at the gate by two MI5 agents who she always referred to as "my friends" and who went out of their way to help her, suppressing a planned book and telling her to contact them immediately if anyone said or wrote anything derogatory about her. According to Sweney, they sent her Christmas cards every year until they retired.

She subsequently worked as a courier to Australia and South America and later for a farm and pet shop business in England. In 1962, together with Margaret Schaffhauser, she bought a house in the countryside between the towns of Osimo and Offagna in the Ancona province, Italy. They sold it in 1970. She died in Surrey, England, on 30 October 1983. In 1998, after David O'Donoghue's research for his PhD dissertation, Hitler's Irish Voices, Edward Sweney asked the British Home Secretary Jack Straw to reopen his sister's case to rectify what he saw as a miscarriage of justice. A file of official papers about Sweney was released by the British National Archives in 2001.

== See also ==
- List of English-language broadcasters for Nazi Germany
