= David O'Donoghue =

David O'Donoghue may refer to:

- David James O'Donoghue (1866–1917), Irish biographer and editor
- David O'Donoghue (historian) (born 1952), Irish journalist and historian
- Dave O'Donoghue (1885–1960), Australian rules footballer

== See also ==
- David O'Donahue, American general
