= Amethé von Zeppelin =

British translator

- Born: Amethé Gwendolen Marion Mackenzie Smeaton; 31 January 1896; Rangoon, Burma
- Died: 2 September 1969 (aged 73); Vienna
- Occupation: Translator
- Spouses: Ian H. P. McEwen (1919); Count Leo von Zeppelin (1929)
- Father: Donald Mackenzie Smeaton

Countess Amethé Gwendolen Marion Mackenzie von Zeppelin (born Amethé Smeaton; 1896 – 1969) was a British woman who married into the Zeppelin family and was known as a translator of philosophical works from German to English. She also co-translated Werner Heisenberg's Die Physik der Atomkerne into English in 1953.

She was considered by the British security services to have been anti-British before the Second World War and to have made an anti-British or propaganda radio broadcast from Vienna in September 1939. Later in the war, she was closely associated with members of the Von Pott Nazi espionage group in Vienna, but her exact involvement in their activities, if any, is unclear.

== Early life and family ==
Amethé Smeaton was born in Rangoon, Burma on 13 January 1896, the daughter of Donald Mackenzie Smeaton (1897–1910) and Marion H. M. Ansell. Her father was a British official in Burma and later a member of Parliament for the Liberal Party.

Smeaton was educated at home, and attended Girton College at the University of Cambridge for one term in 1917, before withdrawing due to ill health. Based on her later translation work and her correspondence with Bertrand Russell it is likely that she studied philosophy.

Smeaton married an RAF Captain, Ian H. P. McEwen in 1919. He divorced her in May 1928, citing Count Zeppelin as a co-respondent. Count Zeppelin was Leo Parcus, the adopted son of Count Eberhard Zeppelin, who took the name Count Leo Parcus von Zeppelin. Smeaton and Parcus were married in Cap Martin, France, in the summer of 1929.

== Second World War ==
Zeppelin was considered by the British security services to have been anti-British before the outbreak of the Second World War and was believed to have made a propaganda or anti-British radio broadcast from Vienna on 21 September 1939 shortly after the outbreak of the war.

During the war, she was closely associated with Lisa von Pott of the Von Pott Group of Nazi spies in Vienna in the pay of Dr Robert Wagner, an S.S. or S.D. officer, but the exact degree of Zeppelin's involvement in the spy group, if any, is unknown. A visiting card from the countess was found among the possessions of the British pro-Nazi broadcaster Susan Sweney which read, in German, "The bearer of this card also brings the bird with her. Herr FINDERS will have spoken to you about them already and will have left the cage and birdseed with you. Please give it (the bird) seed and water till to-morrow morning".

She left Vienna in September 1945 as the war was drawing to a close.

== Career ==
All of Smeaton's translation work was published after her marriage to Count Leo Zeppelin in 1929 starting with Paul Frischauer's Prinz Eugen: Ein mensch und hundert Jahre Geschichte which was published in London in 1934 as Prince Eugène: A Man and a Hundred Years of History. She then translated Rudolf Carnap's, The Logical Syntax of Language (1937) and after the Second World War a number of works of a philosophical nature as well as a mathematical work and Werner Heisenberg's Nuclear Physics in 1953 with Frank Gaynor.

She died on 2 September 1969 in 7/6 Floragasse, Vienna.

== Translations ==
- Paul Frischauer, Prince Eugène: A Man and a Hundred Years of History. Victor Gollancz, London, 1934.
- Rudolf Carnap, The Logical Syntax of Language. Kegan Paul & Co., London, 1937.
- Moritz Schlick Philosophy of Nature. Philosophical Library, New York, 1949.
- Walter Schubart, Russia and Western Man. Frederick Ungar, New York, 1950.
- Bruno Freytag, Philosophical Problems of Mathematics. Philosophical Library, New York, 1951.
- Karl Kobald, Springs of Immortal Sound. Kunsterverlag Wolfrum, Vienna, 1950.
- Werner Heisenberg, Nuclear Physics Methuen, London, 1953. (With Frank Gaynor)
