= Oscar C. Pfaus =

German-American Nazi propagandist

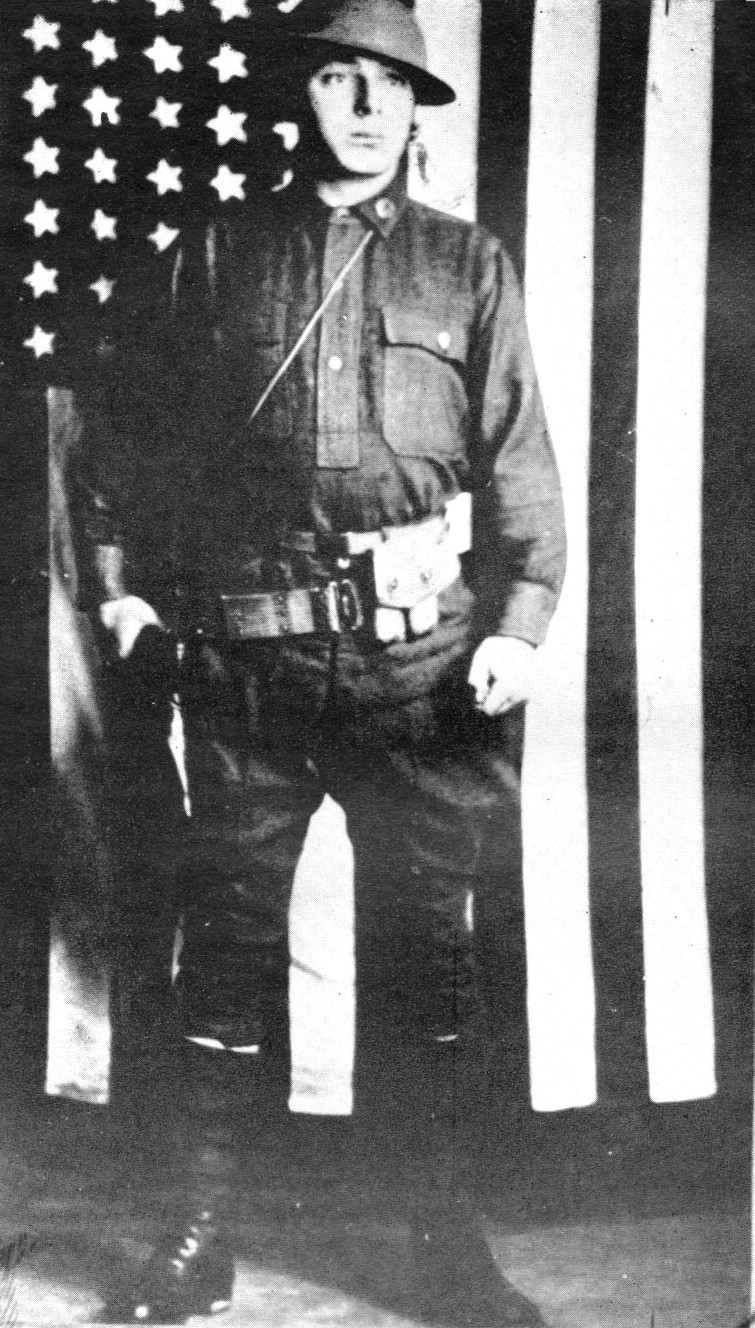
- Oscar C. Pfaus as a U.S. Army soldier
- Born: Oskar Karl Pfaus; 30 January 1901; Illingen, Germany
- Died: unknown
- Other name: Oscar Carl Pfaus
- Citizenship: Naturalized American
- Known for: Nazi propagandist and Abwehr agent
- Espionage activity
- Allegiance: Germany
- Agency: Abwehr
- Codename: STIER

Oscar Carl Pfaus (born Oskar Karl Pfaus; born January 30, 1901) was a German immigrant who became an American citizen through military service. He had a succession of jobs before becoming involved in pro-Nazi organizations in Chicago in the early 1930s and becoming a full-time Nazi propagandist there. He was also active in New York.

He returned to Germany in 1938 to work in propaganda for the Deutscher Fichte-Bund with responsibility for Ireland, the United States, and Canada, attempting to cultivate ties in the U.S. through correspondence with Irish-Americans and anyone who might be sympathetic to German interests. His letters were extensively quoted in the proceedings of the Dies committee on Un-American Activities in 1939.

He was recruited to the Abwehr, the German military intelligence agency, which sent him to Ireland in 1939 to make contact with the Irish Republican Army (IRA) and others who might help Germany. The Abwehr eventually sent an agent to the United States who arranged for the IRA to carry out acts of sabotage there.

Pfaus was active in espionage in Paris in 1941 and 1943, and in 1944 he was at Stalag 357, a prisoner of war camp in Thorn, Poland, where he described his role as "camp leader and interpreter". He later served in Czechoslovakia. In 1949, he said he was anti-Nazi and described the Nazi regime as "the former Prussian regimes of terror".

== Early life ==
Oskar Karl Pfaus was born in Illingen, Baden-Württemberg, Germany, on January 30, 1901. He emigrated to the United States in 1924 and anglicised his name. In 1929, an Oscar C. Pfaus is recorded as having married Sybilla C. Grutler in Cook County, Illinois.

In his letters, Pfaus said he had served in the United States Army, in the Sixth Corps at Fort Sheridan, Illinois, and at Camp Custer, Michigan. According to author Ladislas Farago, he had also been a hobo and had worked as a forester, a prospector, a cowboy, and a policeman in Chicago where he learned about undercover work in the fight with organized crime.

At the time of the 1930 census, he was living in Chicago and working as a machinist. He had filed papers for naturalization as an American citizen and according to evidence later given in Congress, obtained it due to his military service.

== Activities in the United States ==
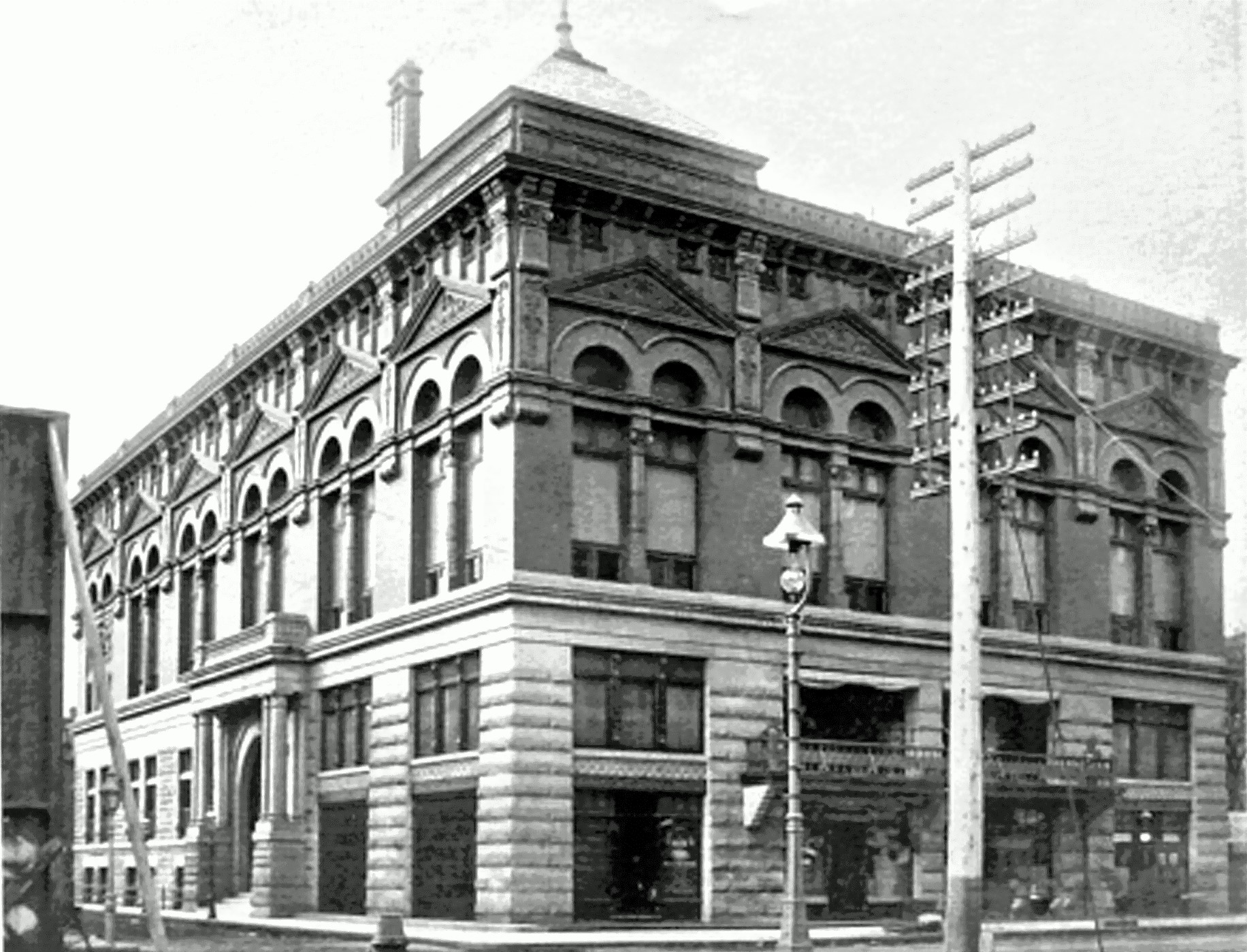
Germania Club, Chicago

Pfaus became active in pro-Nazi activities in the early 1930s and at least initially was not an official agent of the German government which at that time was not interested in developing spies in the United States. According to Ladislas Farago, in Nazism he at last found a cause "worth fighting for" and he accompanied his devotion to it with the development of a philosophy of "Global Brotherhood" for which an acolyte was said to have nominated him for the 1932 Nobel Peace Prize. He does not appear, however, in the official list of nominations.

In Chicago he was a member of the Germania Club of Chicago along with ardent Nazis Walter Kappe and Heinz Spanknöbel and was the Chicago leader of the Friends of New Germany that was founded by Spanknöbel in 1933.

In New York, he joined Ignatz Griebl's not very secret cell of fledgling spies there in 1934 with Axel Wheeler-Hill and another man. The cell was created on the initiative of Grieb who had written to Joseph Goebbels in Germany offering his services as a spy. None of the members had access to secret information at that time and according to Ladislas Farago they were jokingly known among the wider circle of Nazi sympathisers as "Dr. Griebl's undercover boys", although Wheeler-Hill later became a member of the more significant Duquesne Spy Ring. Pfaus also started a Nazi group in New York with the Swedish-born Olov Edvin Tietzow, founder of The American Guard.

He edited the Chicago Weckruf und Beobachter, a forerunner of the Deutscher Weckruf und Beobachter, the official newspaper of the German American Bund, the successor organization to the Friends of New Germany, and was a columnist for Pittsburgh's Der Sonntagsbote. Records of the NSDAP (Nazi Party) show that in 1936 he was an informant for the Reichspressestelle (Reich Press Office) on German matters in the United States.

Pfaus returned to Germany in 1938 at the suggestion of Tegeliss Tannhaeuser, the German consul in Chicago, to head the American-Canadian-Irish section of the Deutscher Fichte-Bund, the Nazi propaganda agency in Hamburg. Around the same time, he became an agent for the Abwehr, the German military intelligence service, with the code name "Stier" ("Bull").

== Mission to Ireland, 1939 ==
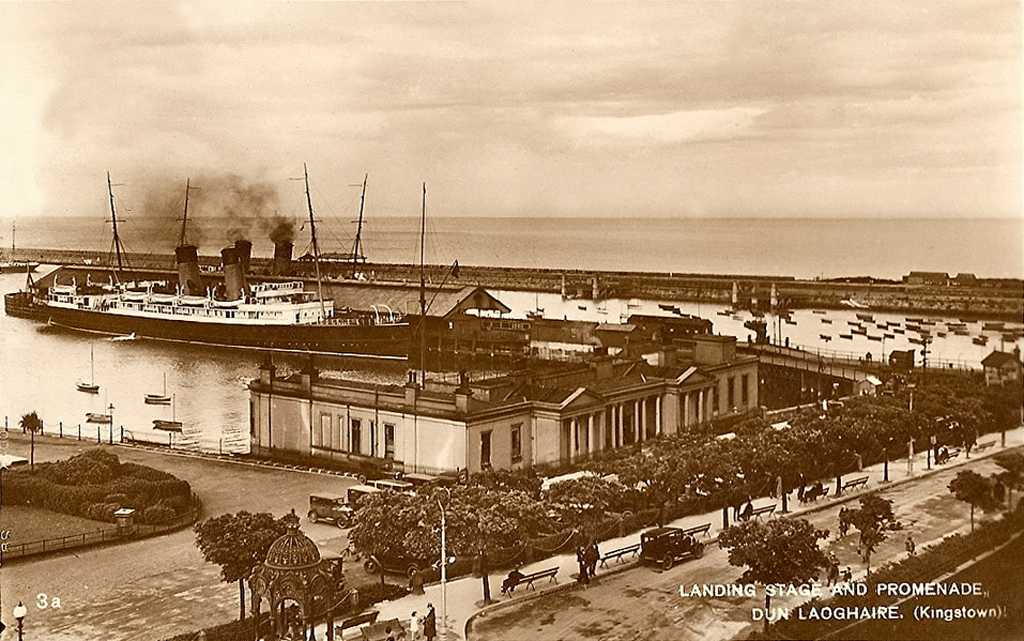
Dún Laoghaire landing stage, County Dublin

In 1939 and throughout the Second World War, Ireland was not a strategic priority for the Germans. Officially, the Abwehr had banned contact with anti-government groups in Ireland although in practice there had been some limited contact with the IRA and Irish nationalists from which the Abwehr had concluded that the IRA was too weak to form a credible partner against Britain. On January 12, 1939, the IRA set out to raise its profile with Germany and to establish a working relationship with the Nazis by sending an ultimatum to Lord Halifax, the British foreign secretary, that if British troops were not withdrawn from Ireland within days, further action would be taken. The IRA subsequently declared war on Britain and began a series of bomb attacks in England on January 16 under the S-Plan or Sabotage Campaign.

Accordingly, in February 1939, Abwehr II, the department responsible for relations with discontented minorities, sent Oscar Pfaus to Ireland under the cover of being a journalist for a German newspaper to make contact with the IRA, the first of 13 agents they sent in 1939–43. He received a briefing from Franz Fromme, whom the Abwehr regarded as an expert on Ireland, and travelled via Harwich, London, and Holyhead, arriving at the coastal town of Dún Laoghaire, county Dublin, on February 2 or 3, 1939 by the mailboat Cambria and staying until February 14. The British authorities warned the Irish that he was coming but Irish intelligence did not keep him under close surveillance as they thought he was travelling only to spread propaganda. On arrival, he made his way to Dublin city where he rented a room in a boarding house.

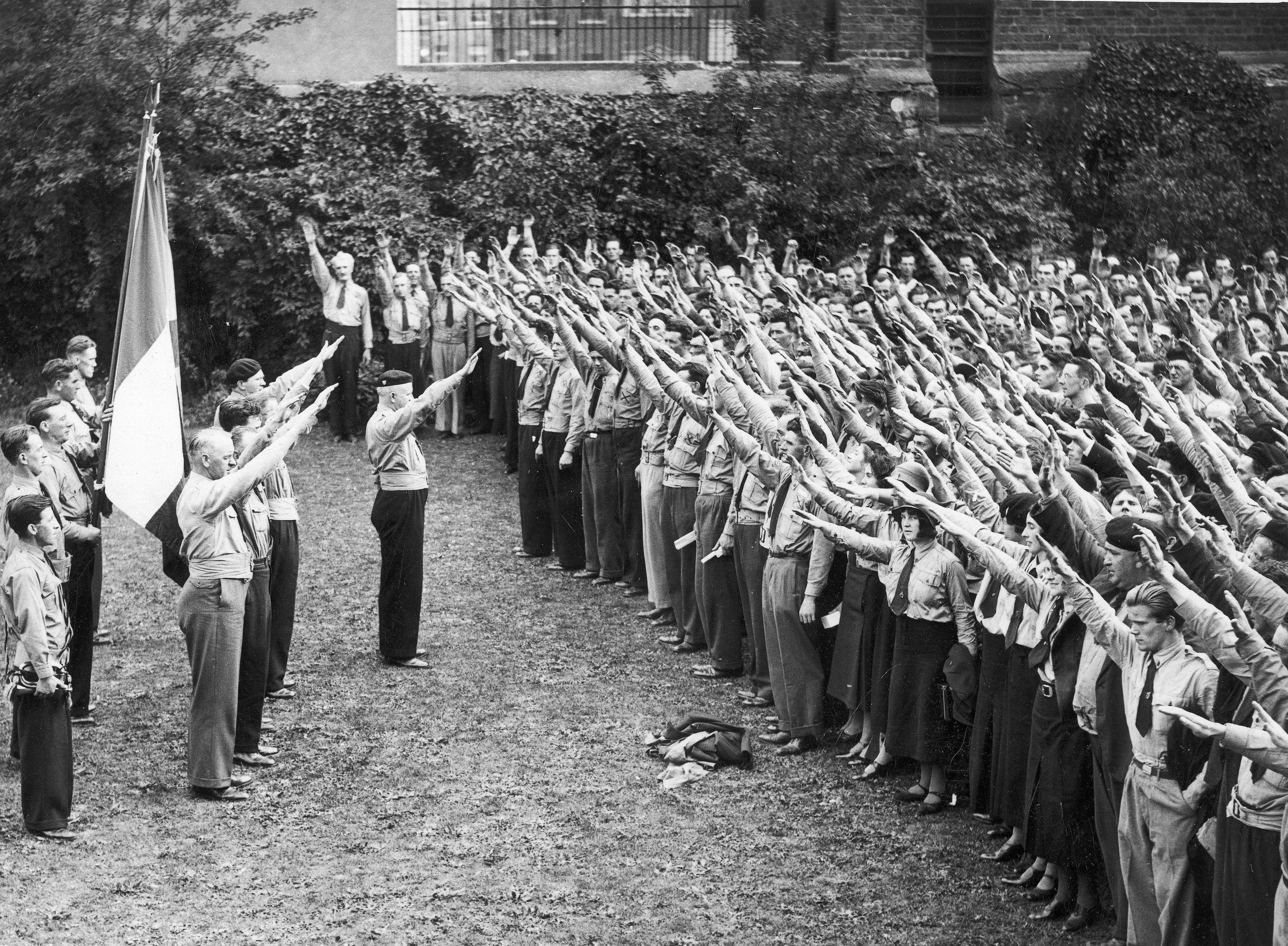
Eoin O'Duffy with his Blueshirts.

The Abwehr's level of knowledge about Ireland was shown by the fact that Pfaus's designated contact was Eoin O'Duffy, a fascist and former Blueshirts leader, but by then, unknown to the Abwehr, a staunch opponent of the IRA. O'Duffy refused to help but Pfaus was able to contact the IRA through O'Duffy's secretary, the fascist sympathiser Liam D. Walsh who knew Maurice Twomey, a former IRA Chief of Staff. Twomey took Pfaus to a Dublin safe house while his status was established and that having been done, Pfaus met IRA leaders Seán Russell and Jim O'Donovan as well as other IRA members. O'Donovan later described Pfaus as a "real S.S. type". It was agreed that an IRA man would visit Germany for further discussions and a £1 note was torn in half for identification purposes with the visitor to take one half and Pfaus to keep the other. O'Donovan subsequently visited Germany three times in 1939.

As well as the IRA, Pfaus was also able to meet individuals from the wider Irish nationalist and republican movements which contained strands of pro-fascism, anti-Semitism, and anti-communism. He met the anti-Semite and anti-democrat William J. Brennan-Whitmore and Liam Walsh, both members of the executive committee of the tiny Celtic Confederation of Occupational Guilds (CCOG), but of interest to the Abwehr, and arranged for Walsh to visit Germany, where he promised to use the CCOG to back German interests. Another of Pfaus's contacts was Maurice O'Connor, an Irish railway clerk who had visited Germany and was pro-Nazi and later took a significant role in the CCOG as it became more radical. O'Connor drew up a pamphlet titled "Who is your enemy?" that was adapted from Pfaus's "We Accuse!", originally published in Chicago.

As a result of Pfaus's visit, the IRA established better connections with the Germans, but they never acquired the munitions and wireless equipment that they hoped for, while the Germans were never able to persuade the IRA to launch a full assault on Northern Ireland to divert British troops away from the mainland, meaning that there were few concrete results of the collaboration. The German agents that followed Pfaus into Ireland during the war proved ineffectual at best and incompetent at worst, such as Walter Simon, who was briefed by Pfaus and arrived in Ireland with a list of 2,400 people who the Abwehr thought might be good contacts. Soon after arrival, he got drunk and was arrested with the list, which the Irish used to round up potential subversives. Pfaus's visit and subsequent contacts with the IRA did, however, allow the Germans to become acquainted with IRA support and operations in the United States and in due course to send an agent, Karl Franz Rekowski, to the U.S. where he arranged for the IRA to carry out sabotage attacks such as the 1940 attack on the Hercules Powder Company plant in New Jersey, in which 52 people died and a further 50 were injured.

== Deutscher Fichte-Bund ==
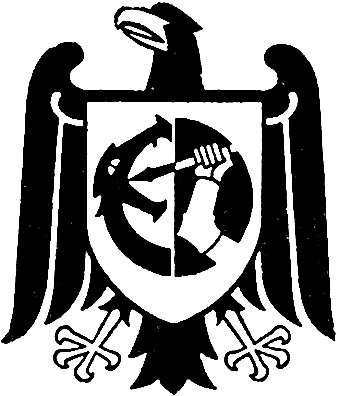
Emblem of the Deutscher Fichte-Bund

Back in Germany, as part of his propaganda activities for the Deutscher Fichte-Bund (DFB), Pfaus wrote ingratiating letters to contacts in the United States who he thought might be sympathetic to Germany, adapting his approach according to their background and interests, such as being Irish-American and therefore perhaps not supportive of the British Empire, or anti-Semitic or anti-communist. His letters were extensively quoted from in the proceedings of the Dies committee of the U.S. Congress's House Un-American Activities Committee in September and October 1939:

- In March 1939 he wrote to one correspondent about a possible visit to the U.S. for the purpose of "studying Irish-American folklore" and seeking to be introduced to "influential Irish-Americans".
- In May he wrote to another about the threat to Christianity from the alliance of England and France with its "arch-enemy", "Red Russia", and the role that Irish-Americans could play in protecting American ideals from a "Jew-British-Red combination", a position that was soon undermined after Germany itself formed a pact with the Soviet Union.
- In June, he wrote asking for help to be put in contact with General George Moseley, his former commanding officer in the U.S. Army and a committed anti-Semite.

In August 1939 he got married in Hamburg with Franz Fromme as best man.

== Second World War ==
In June 1941, Pfaus was in Paris and visited the Anglo-Irish fascist sympathiser and broadcaster Susan Sweney (Mrs Susan Hilton) at her hotel with the head of the DFB Theodore Kessemeir to ask her to undertake undercover work in Ireland, the United States or Portuguese East Africa. Sweney refused, feeling the work too "dirty", but travelled to Berlin with Pfaus and his colleagues where she made propaganda broadcasts to Scotland (as Ann Tower) and Ireland.

In November 1943, Pfaus attempted to meet Irish citizens in Paris who might know about the preparations for the Allied invasion of France, possibly an Irish girl who would spy for the Germans in return for transit to Ireland. He achieved little however, because his main source, the Irish priest, Father Monaghan of the Chapelle Saint-Joseph, had been an officer in the British Army during the First World War and was a chaplain to the British Expeditionary Force in 1940 with connections to MI6. When Susan Sweney was interviewed by MI5 in 1945, she said she had worked with Monaghan to smuggle British merchant seamen out of Paris.

In 1944, Pfaus was at Stalag 357 in Thorn, Poland, a camp for British and Commonwealth prisoners of war. He described his role there as "camp leader and interpreter" and said he had been transferred to Czechoslovakia because of his fraternisation with British prisoners. In 1950, a letter from Pfaus was published in the Australian press in which he appealed for his former Australian "friends" from the camp to contact him as he had photographs of them that he had promised to pass on such as the 1944 Anzac Day commemoration ceremony held by the prisoners. He wrote, "I had many Australian friends in the camp and they were well aware of my anti-Nazi attitude."

== Later life ==
After the war, Pfaus lived in Hamburg's Mülhäuser Straße in the British zone of occupation. He continued to write letters, having one published in a Canadian paper in 1949 in which he complained that "those who did away with the former Prussian regimes of terror" in Germany had failed to replace them with democracy and justice.

The State Archives of Baden-Württemberg hold a collection of newspaper clippings relating to Pfaus.

== See also ==
- George W. Christians
- Helmut Clissmann
- Irish Republican Army–Abwehr collaboration
- The enemy of my enemy is my friend
- Operation Green
- Tom Barry
