= Lisa von Pott =

Nazi agent and sculptor, b. 1888

- Born: Lisa Louisa Elisabeth von Pott; 18 February 1888; Pola, Istria
- Died: unknown
- Occupation: Sculptor
- Known for: Association with Rabindranath Tagore and teaching at Kala Bhavana; Organiser of the "Von Pott Group" in Vienna
- Parent: Paul Friedrich August von Pott

Lisa Louisa Elisabeth von Pott (18 February 1888 – ?) was an Austrian espionage agent, sculptor, secretary to the poet Rabindranath Tagore in the 1920s and 30s, and in 1928 the first instructor in sculpture at Kala Bhavana in Bengal. With the outbreak of the Second World War in 1939 she was interned in India as an enemy alien, and in 1940 repatriated to Austria.

She was the organiser of a Nazi espionage group in Vienna, later known to the British security services as the "Von Pott Group". The group was in the pay of Dr Robert Wagner, an S.S. or S.D. officer, and spied on anyone in the city suspected of helping the Allies or having pro-British views. According to a witness, von Pott later admitted to the Russians that she had denounced to the Gestapo the members of a dinner party she had attended, resulting in them all being arrested and several being sent to concentration camps. She was last recorded as having left Vienna in 1945, possibly heading for Switzerland, and to be staying at the castle of a friend in an Alpine town.

== Early life and family ==
Edle Lisa von Pott was born on 18 February 1888 in Pola, Istria, (then in Austria, now in Croatia), to Kontreadmiral (rear admiral) Edler Paul Friedrich August von Pott (1842-1903) of the Imperial Austrian Navy, commander of the Pola. She spent her youth in England.

She described herself as a Baronin (the wife of a Baron).

== Career ==
In 1914-18 von Pott was secretary and "lady of the house" to Georg von und zu Franckenstein (later Sir George Frankenstein) at the Austro-Hungarian embassy in Brussels. She was suspected of being a spy for the Germans on Belgian aristocratic families and of counter-espionage on behalf of the Allies.

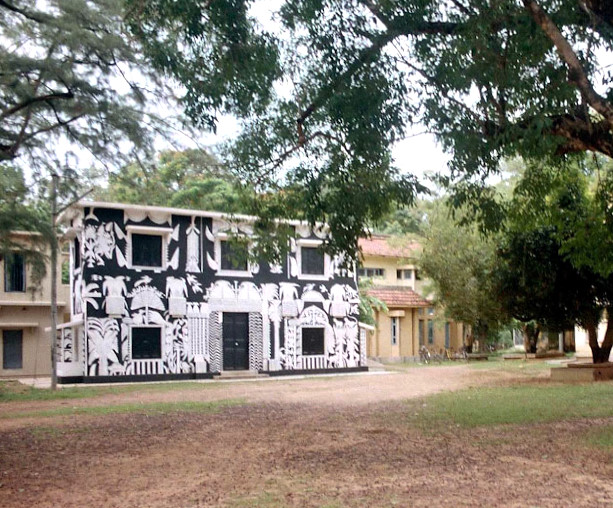
Kala Bhavana, Santiniketan

In 1920 she held an art exhibition in London and in October 1926 an exhibition of painting and sculpture at the Austrian embassy in Belgrave Square, London. In October 1927, two of her drawings were shown at the 26th annual exhibition of the Women's International Art Club in London.

From 1926 to 1939 she was secretary to the Nobel laureate Rabindranath Tagore in India and in 1928 became the first instructor in sculpture at Kala Bhavana, the fine arts faculty of Visva-Bharati founded by Tagore and under the directorship of Nandalal Bose. There she taught Ramkinkar Baij and Sudhir Khastgir, both, like Bose, members of the Bengal school of art which was closely associated with the cause of Indian nationalism. With the outbreak of the Second World War in 1939 she was interned as an enemy alien and in 1940 repatriated to Austria.

== Von Pott Group ==
Back in Vienna, von Pott became active in anti-British circles and in 1941-43 published anti-British articles. She was the organiser of a Nazi espionage group there later known to the British security services as the "Von Pott Group" which reported to Dr Robert Wagner, an S.S. or S.D. officer. The function of the group was to spy on anyone in the city suspected of helping the Allies or having pro-British views. She sometimes used the alias "Maria Lisa D'Altura". Her address was Bez III Stanislausgasse 4 and Schuetzengasse 9 and adjoining studio.

The British security services said she "moved in the best Austrian circles, and was so skilful that persons of the highest intelligence did not suspect her till she was denounced. She is of great intelligence, with a distinguished manner, able to make and use contacts in the highest circles. Had no private means or source of honest income."

They believed the following people to be members of the Von Pott Group:

- Subhas Chandra Bose - Indian nationalist who co-operated with Nazi Germany against the British. British intelligence wrote that a search of von Pott's studio and information from informants indicated a close connection between von Pott and Bose. Bose had been in Vienna before the war and had secretly married a Viennese woman, Emilie Schenkl, in 1937.
- Hans Kaufman - a friend of Wagner and member of the Nazi party who posed as a communist.
- Gestapo interrogators Foppelt, Berger, Eduard Tucek, and Scmiedel.
- Frau Schoen - introduced by Wagner to work as secretary to the economist Dr Kogerer. The British believed that Schoen denounced Kogerer and his wife to the Gestapo. Both were sent to Mauthausen concentration camp and not heard from again.
- Susan Sweney - British pro-Nazi broadcaster and journalist, born in India, who was recruited by von Pott to the group under the pretext of fighting communism. Von Pott introduced her to Luze Krimann with whom she lived.
- Luze Krimann - keen Nazi who Susan Sweney lived with in Vienna. Her husband, Herbert Felix Krimann, deserted from the Luftwaffe in February 1945. He claimed, to his wife, to have been denounced to the Gestapo by von Pott and Sweney.
- Amethé von Zeppelin - British woman who married Count Leo Zeppelin and was regarded by the British security services as anti-British since before the outbreak of the Second World War. Her degree of involvement was uncertain but she appeared to send a coded message to Sweney which was quoted in British intelligence reports.

In June 1944, von Pott was at a dinner party at the house of Dr Alphons Klingsland, a leading Viennese lawyer, where the guests spoke in strongly pro-British terms. In October, they were all arrested and some sent to concentration camps. Willi Wiesbauer, one of those sent to a camp, was released by the Russians in May 1945 but soon re-arrested by the NKVD (Russian secret police) and interrogated because the Nazis had shown interest in him. Von Pott was also arrested and an interpreter warned Wiesbauer against her and said she had admitted acting as a Gestapo agent for money and to have denounced the dinner party guests to them.

She was released a few days later and said to have left Vienna with her friend Joan Whitehead in August 1945, probably for Switzerland. She was then seen at the ski resort of Kitzbühel in the company of French journalists, and in September 1945 was staying as a guest of Maria von Einem at her castle near Schladming.
