= Tirranna (ship) =

Merchant ship sunk in WWII

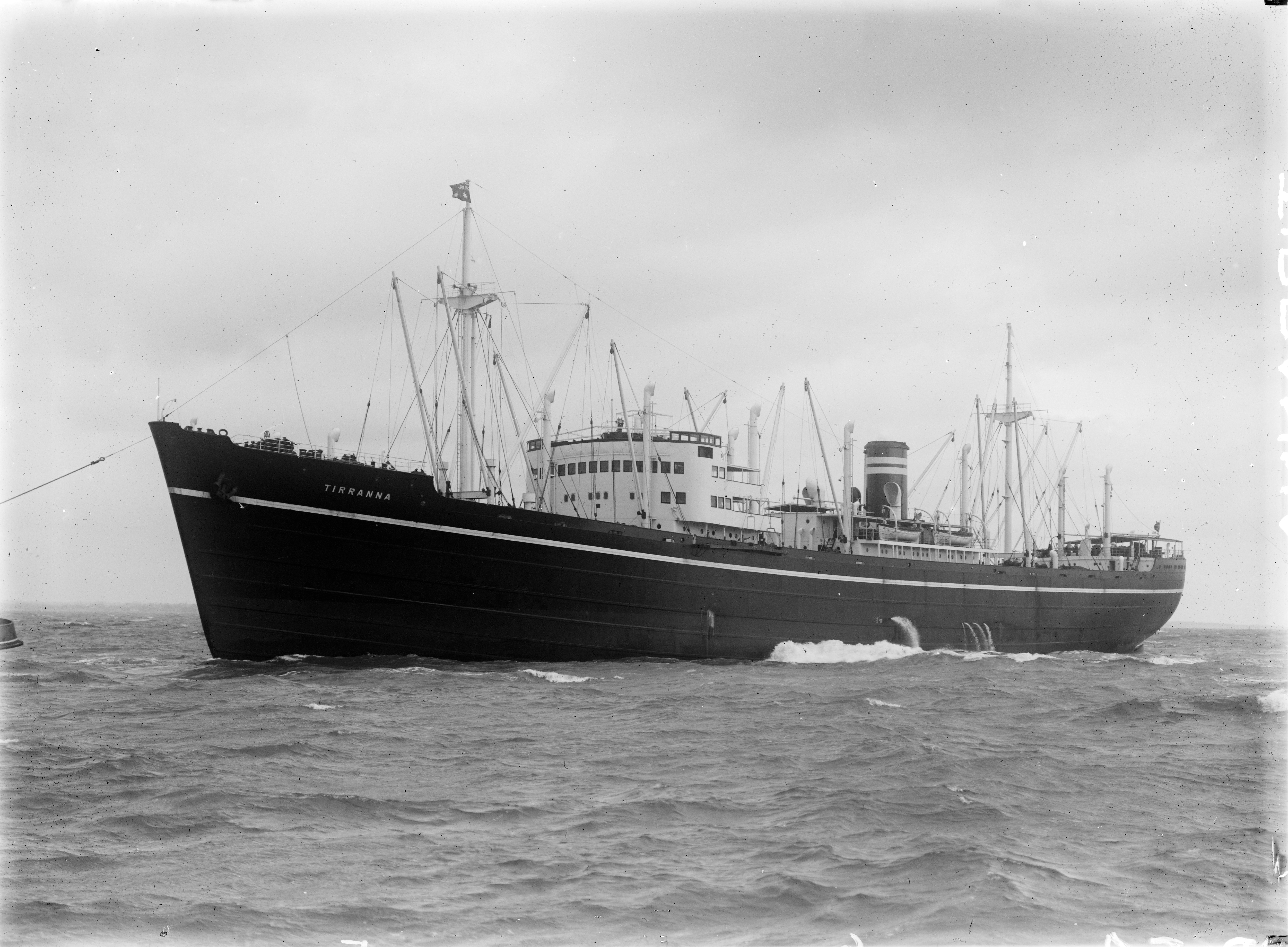
Tirranna

Tirranna was a Norwegian merchant ship captured by the German merchant raider Atlantis during the Second World War. She took on the passengers and crew of Kemmendine which had been captured and sunk by Atlantis in July 1940 and sailed for France as a prize ship with a cargo of looted goods. On 22 September 1940 she was torpedoed off the coast of France by the British submarine HMS Tuna and sank with 87 lives lost. The survivors were taken to a German naval facility in Royan.
