= British Renegades Warning List =

The British Renegades Warning List was a list of people that the British security services suspected of assisting the Axis forces during the Second World War. It was sent to SHAEF (Supreme Headquarters Allied Expeditionary Force) on 6 May 1944 in advance of the Normandy landings on 6 June 1944 to enable Allied troops to identify people in occupied Europe who might try to subvert the invasion effort.

== Names on the list ==
This is an incomplete list of the "renegades":

- Benson Railton Freeman (RAF flying instructor who served in the Waffen-SS)
- No. 29 Susan Hilton (Pro-Nazi broadcaster)
- No. 80 Walter Purdy No. 86 Phyllis “Rosaleen” James

== See also ==
- List of Allied traitors during World War II
