= Hercules Powder plant disaster =

1940 explosion of an armaments factory in Roxbury, New Jersey, US

Coordinates: 40.889918°N 74.631048°W

The Hercules Powder plant disaster was an explosion at an armaments factory owned by the Hercules Powder Company in the Kenvil section of Roxbury, New Jersey, on 12 September 1940. About 52 people were killed and 100 injured.

The cause of the explosion remains unclear. Possible explanations include an industrial accident or sabotage carried out by the Irish Republican Army (IRA) or by a group of German Americans living in nearby Sussex County. Congressman Martin Dies, chair of the House Un-American Activities Committee at the time, believed that Nazi agents were responsible for the blast. After German immigrant Oscar C. Pfaus helped connect Nazi agents with the IRA in America, Abwehr agent Karl Franz Rekowski was sent to the U.S. where he arranged for the IRA to carry out sabotage attacks. Rekowski alleges the IRA carried out the attack on the plant.

The 1940 explosion at the Hercules factory followed another in 1933 that killed six people; in 1989, a third explosion there shattered windows across the town.
