= Kenvil, New Jersey =

Populated place in Morris County, New Jersey, US

- Census-designated place
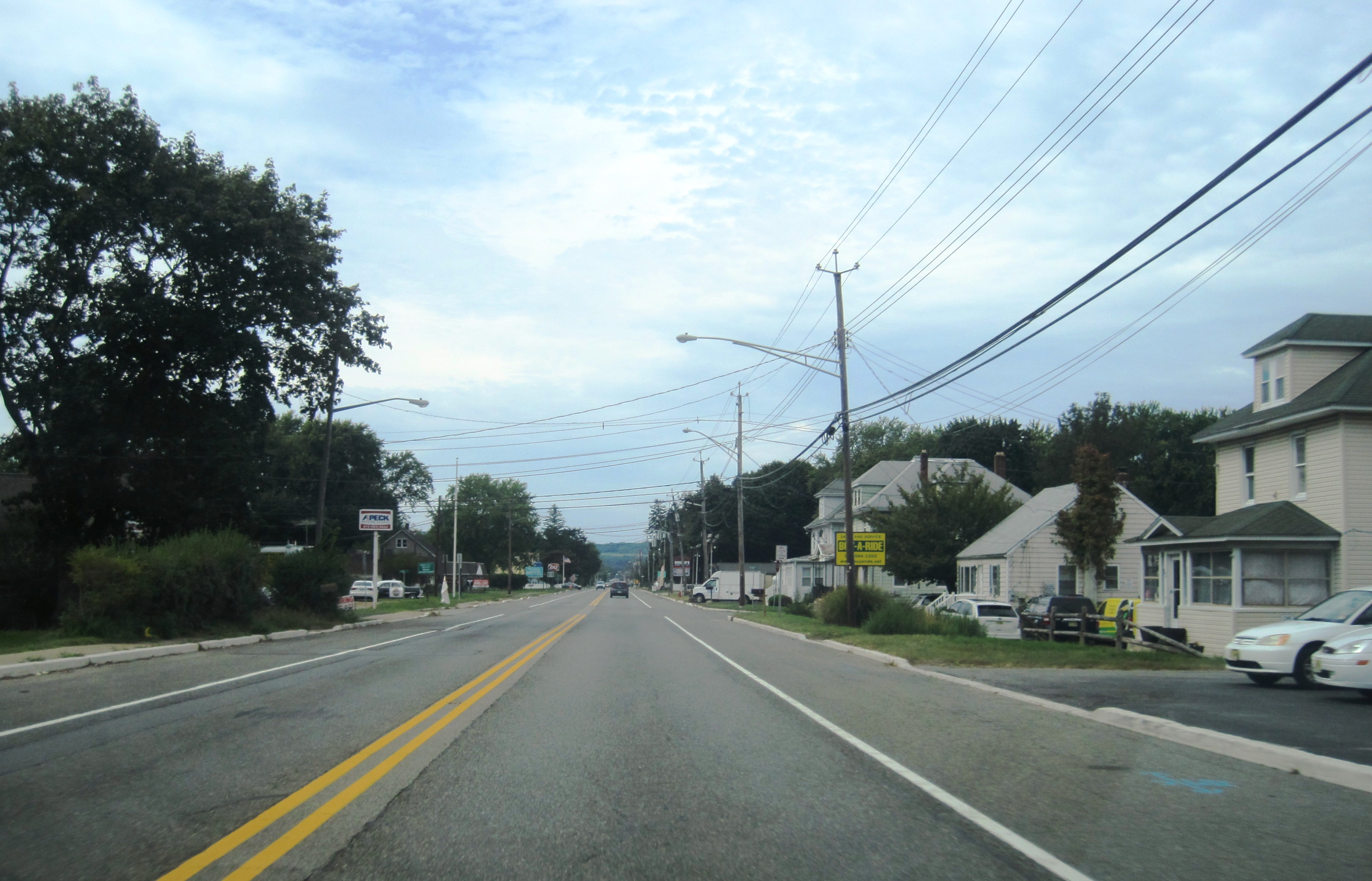
- U.S. Route 46 traveling through Kenvil

- Location in Morris County and the state of New Jersey.

- Location in Morris County Location in New Jersey Location in the United States
- Coordinates: 40.870198°N 74.631639°W
- Country: United States
- State: New Jersey
- County: Morris
- Township: Roxbury

Area
  - Total: 1.36 sq mi (3.51 km^{2})
  - Land: 1.19 sq mi (3.07 km^{2})
  - Water: 0.17 sq mi (0.43 km^{2}) 15.89%
- Elevation: 709 ft (216 m)

Population (2020)
  - Total: 1,806
  - Density: 1,522.7/sq mi (587.92/km^{2})
- Time zone: UTC−05:00 (Eastern (EST))
  - Summer (DST): UTC−04:00 (Eastern (EDT))
- ZIP Code: 07847
- FIPS code: 34-36720
- GNIS feature ID: 02584005

Kenvil is an unincorporated community and census-designated place (CDP) located within Roxbury Township, in Morris County, in the U.S. state of New Jersey. As of the 2020 census, it had a population of 1,806.

== History ==
The Kenvil section of Roxbury Township was originally called McCainsville.

Kenvil was home to the second dynamite plant in the United States, established in 1872 by the Atlantic Giant Powder Company. After acquisition of the plant by the Hercules Powder Company in 1913, it also manufactured smokeless powder. The company experienced several major explosions, killing six people in 1934, 51 people in 1940, and shattering windows across town in 1989.

== Geography ==
Kenvil is in west-central Morris County and occupies the eastern part of Roxbury Township. It is bordered to the southwest by unincorporated Succasunna and to the southeast by Mine Hill Township. U.S. Route 46 passes through the center of Kenvil, leading east 3 miles (5 km) to Dover and west 5 miles (8 km) to Netcong.

According to the U.S. Census Bureau, the Kenvil CDP has a total area of 1.353 square miles (3.504 km^{2}), including 1.186 square miles (3.072 km^{2}) of land and 0.167 square miles (0.433 km^{2}) of water (12.34%). There are several small lakes in the community, including Marine Lake just east of the center of town and a portion of Sunset Lake in the southeast corner. The Lamington River flows southwest out of Sunset Lake, part of the Raritan River watershed.

== Demographics ==
Historical population
Census	Pop.	Note	%±
2010	3,009		—
2020	1,806		−40.0%
Population sources: 2010 2020

Kenvil was part of the Succasunna-Kenvil CDP as part of the 2000 United States census, at which time the combined population was 12,569. For the 2010 census, the area was split into two CDPs, Succasunna (with a 2010 Census population of 9,152) and Kenvil (3,009 as of 2010).

=== 2020 census ===
Kenvil CDP, New Jersey – Racial and ethnic composition Note: the US Census treats Hispanic/Latino as an ethnic category. This table excludes Latinos from the racial categories and assigns them to a separate category. Hispanics/Latinos may be of any race.
Race / Ethnicity (NH = Non-Hispanic)	Pop 2010	Pop 2020	% 2010	% 2020
White alone (NH)	2,220	1,041	73.78%	57.64%
Black or African American alone (NH)	52	60	1.73%	3.32%
Native American or Alaska Native alone (NH)	0	0	0.00%	0.00%
Asian alone (NH)	210	119	6.98%	6.59%
Native Hawaiian or Pacific Islander alone (NH)	0	1	0.00%	0.06%
Other race alone (NH)	5	22	0.17%	1.22%
Mixed race or Multiracial (NH)	41	86	1.36%	4.76%
Hispanic or Latino (any race)	481	477	15.99%	26.41%
Total	3,009	1,806	100.00%	100.00%

=== 2010 census ===
The 2010 United States census counted 3,009 people, 1,095 households, and 773 families in the CDP. The population density was 2,262.8 per square mile (873.7/km^{2}). There were 1,149 housing units at an average density of 864.1 per square mile (333.6/km^{2}). The racial makeup was 83.52% (2,513) White, 2.19% (66) Black or African American, 0.13% (4) Native American, 7.18% (216) Asian, 0.00% (0) Pacific Islander, 4.55% (137) from other races, and 2.43% (73) from two or more races. Hispanic or Latino of any race were 15.99% (481) of the population.

Of the 1,095 households, 30.3% had children under the age of 18; 54.6% were married couples living together; 10.4% had a female householder with no husband present and 29.4% were non-families. Of all households, 25.0% were made up of individuals and 13.1% had someone living alone who was 65 years of age or older. The average household size was 2.66 and the average family size was 3.13.

20.9% of the population were under the age of 18, 7.6% from 18 to 24, 26.1% from 25 to 44, 28.9% from 45 to 64, and 16.5% who were 65 years of age or older. The median age was 42.2 years. For every 100 females, the population had 95.4 males. For every 100 females ages 18 and older there were 94.8 males.

== Transportation ==
U.S. Route 46 passes through Kenvil, and Route 10 passes through Succasunna to the south. The Dover and Rockaway River Railroad runs rail freight service through the area two to five times per week on the Chester Branch, High Bridge Branch and Dover & Rockaway Branch.
