= Succasunna-Kenvil, New Jersey =

Populated place in Morris County, New Jersey, US

- Former census-designated place
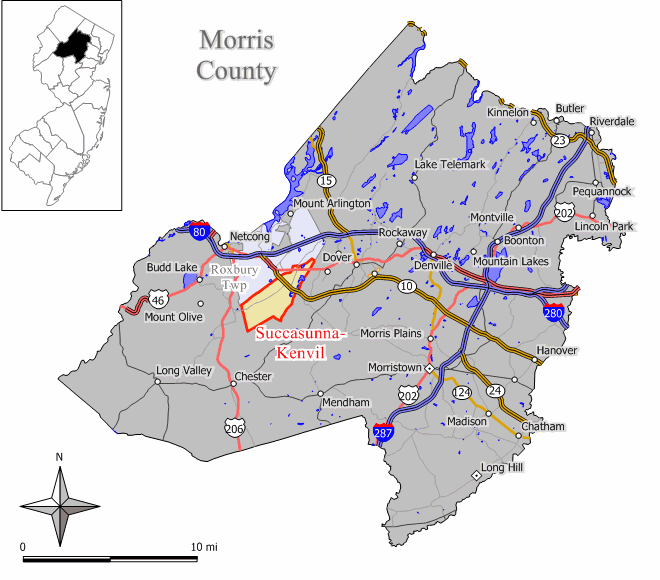
- Map of Succasunna-Kenvil CDP in Morris County. Inset: Location of Morris County in New Jersey.
- Coordinates: 40°51′41″N 74°38′48″W
- Country: United States
- State: New Jersey
- County: Morris
- Township: Roxbury

Area
  - Total: 6.8 sq mi (17.6 km^{2})
  - Land: 6.7 sq mi (17.3 km^{2})
  - Water: 0.12 sq mi (0.3 km^{2})

Population (2000 census)
  - Total: 12,569
  - Density: 1,884/sq mi (727.5/km^{2})
- Time zone: UTC−05:00 (Eastern (EST))
  - Summer (DST): UTC−04:00 (Eastern (EDT))
- FIPS code: 3471385

Succasunna-Kenvil is a former census-designated place (CDP) located within Roxbury Township, in Morris County, in the U.S. state of New Jersey. As of the 2000 United States census, the CDP's population was 12,569. For the 2010 census, the area was split into two CDPs, Succasunna (with a 2010 census population of 9,152) and Kenvil (3,009 as of 2010).

== Geography ==
According to the United States Census Bureau, the CDP had a total area of 17.6 km^{2} (6.8 sq mi). 17.3 km^{2} (6.7 sq mi) of land and 0.3 km^{2} (0.12 sq mi) of water (1.77%).

== Demographics ==
Historical population
Census	Pop.	Note	%±
1950	2,383		—
1980	10,931		—
1990	11,781		7.8%
2000	12,569		6.7%
Population sources: 1950 1960 1970; 1980 1990 2000

Succasunna-Kenvil was listed as an unincorporated community in the 1950 U.S. census (pop. 2,383). It did not appear in subsequent censuses until it was listed as census designated place in the 1980 U.S. census.

The 2000 United States census counted 12,569 people, 4,138 households, and 3,475 families residing in the CDP. The population density was 727.6 people/km^{2} (1,884 people/mi^{2}). The total of 4,184 housing units had a density of 242.2/km^{2} (627/mi^{2}). The racial makeup of the CDP was 92.99% White, 1.34% Black or African American, 0.1% Native American, 4.11% Asian, 0.0% Pacific Islander, 0.67% from other races, and 0.81% from two or more races. 3.87% of the population were Hispanic or Latino of any race. Out of the 4,138 households, 43.6% had children under the age of 18 living with them, 74.5% were married couples living together, 6.9% had a female householder with no husband present, and 16.0% were non-families. 13.3% of all households were individual persons and 5.4% had someone living alone of the age of 65 years or older. The average household size was 3.02 and the average family size was 3.33.

In the CDP the population was spread out, with 28.4% under the age of 18, 5.8% from 18 to 24, 30.1% from 25 to 44, 26.0% from 45 to 64, and 9.6% who were 65 years of age or older. The median age was 38 years. For every 100 females, there were 97.9 males. For every 100 females age 18 and over, there were 93.4 males.

The median income for a household in the CDP was $83,614, and the median income for a family was $90,015. Males had a median income of $64,188 versus $37,841 for females. The per capita income for the CDP was $31,923. About 1.9% of families and 2.4% of the population were below the poverty line, including 2.4% of those under age 18 and 1.9% of those age 65 or over.
