= Succasunna, New Jersey =

Place in Morris County, New Jersey, United States

- Census-designated place
- Location in Morris County and the state of New Jersey.

- Location in Morris County Location in New Jersey Location in the United States
- Coordinates: 40.851023°N 74.658201°W
- Country: United States
- State: New Jersey
- County: Morris
- Township: Roxbury

Area
  - Total: 6.04 sq mi (15.64 km^{2})
  - Land: 5.87 sq mi (15.20 km^{2})
  - Water: 0.17 sq mi (0.43 km^{2}) 1.14%
- Elevation: 751 ft (229 m)

Population (2020)
  - Total: 10,338
  - Density: 1,761.3/sq mi (680.05/km^{2})
- Time zone: UTC−05:00 (Eastern (EST))
  - Summer (DST): UTC−04:00 (Eastern (EDT))
- ZIP Code: 07876
- FIPS code: 34-71370
- GNIS feature ID: 02584032

Succasunna is an unincorporated community and census-designated place (CDP) in Roxbury Township, Morris County, New Jersey, United States, serving as the township's downtown and population center. As of the 2020 census, it had a population of 10,338, up from 9,152 in 2010.

== History ==
The name "Succasunna" comes from the Lenni Lenape Native American word for "land of black stones", most likely due to the rich iron ore deposits in the area. The community was established circa 1740.

The Morris Canal was an important transportation link in the iron industry around Succasunna, carrying coal to iron ore-producing areas throughout North Jersey. The canal was abandoned in 1924 and largely dismantled.

Succasunna was the site of the world's first electronic switching public telephone exchange. The Western Electric model 1ESS system was cut over for service on the New Jersey Bell 584 central office on May 30, 1965. A commemorative plaque on the wall of the central office building notes this historic event. Instead of electro-mechanical relays, the 1ESS was the first commercial computerized electronic switching system. This innovation allowed for features of modern telephone service, like call forwarding, call waiting, and three-way calling.

== Geography ==
Succasunna is in western Morris County and occupies the southern portion of Roxbury Township. It is bordered to the northwest by Ledgewood and to the northeast by Kenvil, both in Roxbury Township. It is bordered to the southeast by Randolph Township, to the south by Chester Township, and to the southwest by Flanders in Mount Olive Township.

New Jersey Route 10 passes through the northeast part of Succasunna, leading northwest 1 mile (1.6 km) to its terminus at U.S. Route 46 in Ledgewood and east 13 miles (21 km) to Whippany. The Morristown and Erie Railway runs rail freight service through the area two to five times per week on its High Bridge Branch.

According to the U.S. Census Bureau, the Succasunna CDP has a total area of 6.04 square miles (15.64 km^{2}), of which 5.87 square miles (15.20 km^{2}) are land and 0.17 square miles (0.44 km^{2}), or 2.78%, are water. The community is drained by the Lamington River, which forms the southeast border of the CDP and is a tributary of the North Branch of the Raritan River, and by Drakes Brook, which flows southwest out of the community and is a tributary of the South Branch of the Raritan.

== Demographics ==
Historical population
Census	Pop.	Note	%±
2010	9,152		—
2020	10,338		13.0%
Population sources: 2010

Succasunna was part of the Succasunna-Kenvil CDP in the 2000 United States census, which counted the combined population of Succasunna and Kenvil as 12,569. For the 2010 census, the area was split into two CDPs, Succasunna, with a population of 9,152, and Kenvil with 3,009 people.

=== Racial and ethnic composition ===
Succasunna CDP, New Jersey – Racial and ethnic composition Note: the US Census treats Hispanic/Latino as an ethnic category. This table excludes Latinos from the racial categories and assigns them to a separate category. Hispanics/Latinos may be of any race.
Race / Ethnicity (NH = Non-Hispanic)	Pop 2010	Pop 2020	% 2010	% 2020
White alone (NH)	7,948	8,206	86.84%	79.38%
Black or African American alone (NH)	123	157	1.34%	1.52%
Native American or Alaska Native alone (NH)	2	5	0.02%	0.05%
Asian alone (NH)	445	530	4.86%	5.13%
Native Hawaiian or Pacific Islander alone (NH)	0	1	0.00%	0.01%
Other race alone (NH)	7	39	0.08%	0.38%
Mixed race or Multiracial (NH)	91	276	0.99%	2.67%
Hispanic or Latino (any race)	536	1,124	5.86%	10.87%
Total	9,152	10,338	100.00%	100.00%

=== 2020 census ===
As of the 2020 census, Succasunna had a population of 10,338. The median age was 45.3 years. 20.1% of residents were under the age of 18 and 19.0% of residents were 65 years of age or older. For every 100 females there were 99.5 males, and for every 100 females age 18 and over there were 96.9 males age 18 and over.

100.0% of residents lived in urban areas, while 0.0% lived in rural areas.

There were 3,657 households in Succasunna, of which 32.3% had children under the age of 18 living in them. Of all households, 69.6% were married-couple households, 10.7% were households with a male householder and no spouse or partner present, and 15.9% were households with a female householder and no spouse or partner present. About 15.5% of all households were made up of individuals and 7.9% had someone living alone who was 65 years of age or older.

There were 3,744 housing units, of which 2.3% were vacant. The homeowner vacancy rate was 0.9% and the rental vacancy rate was 3.5%.

=== 2010 census ===
The 2010 United States census counted 9,152 people, 3,110 households, and 2,650 families in the CDP. The population density was 1,784.6 per square mile (689.0/km^{2}). There were 3,163 housing units at an average density of 616.8 per square mile (238.1/km^{2}). The racial makeup was 91.40% (8,365) White, 1.48% (135) Black or African American, 0.04% (4) Native American, 4.91% (449) Asian, 0.00% (0) Pacific Islander, 0.79% (72) from other races, and 1.39% (127) from two or more races. Hispanic or Latino of any race were 5.86% (536) of the population.

Of the 3,110 households, 38.1% had children under the age of 18; 75.2% were married couples living together; 7.3% had a female householder with no husband present and 14.8% were non-families. Of all households, 12.2% were made up of individuals and 5.0% had someone living alone who was 65 years of age or older. The average household size was 2.94 and the average family size was 3.20.

24.9% of the population were under the age of 18, 7.1% from 18 to 24, 20.7% from 25 to 44, 35.3% from 45 to 64, and 12.1% who were 65 years of age or older. The median age was 43.5 years. For every 100 females, the population had 98.2 males. For every 100 females ages 18 and older there were 93.5 males.

== Education ==
As part of Roxbury Township, residents of Succasunna are served by the Roxbury School District.

Established in 1963, St. Therese School is a Catholic school located in the community, operated under the auspices of the Roman Catholic Diocese of Paterson.

== Notable people ==
People who were born in, residents of, or otherwise closely associated with Succasunna include:

- Harry "A" Chesler (born 1898), comic book entrepreneur, publisher and packager
- Philemon Dickerson (1788–1862), 12th governor of New Jersey
- Leo Warren Jenkins (1913–1989), educator who served as the sixth president and chancellor of what is now East Carolina University
- Doug Miller (born 1969), soccer player and coach
- Paige Monaghan (born 1996), professional soccer player who currently plays for Sky Blue FC of the National Women's Soccer League
