= German auxiliary cruiser Atlantis =

Merchant raider used by the Nazi German Kriegsmarine during WWII

Coordinates: 4°12′0″S 18°42′0″W

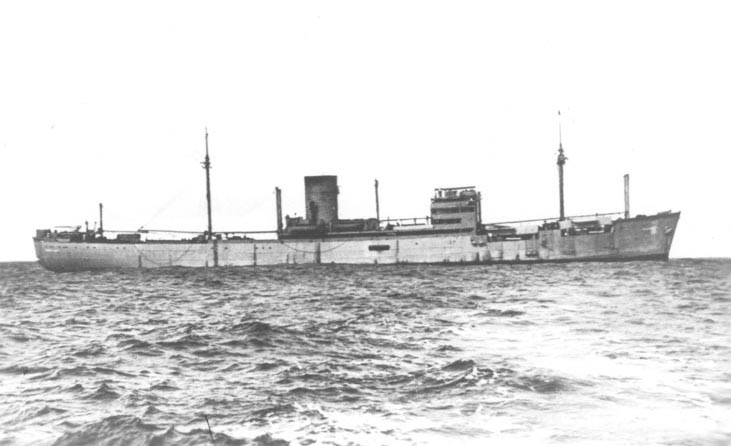
- Atlantis

History

Germany
- Name: Goldenfels
- Owner: DDG Hansa
- Operator: DDG Hansa
- Port of registry: Bremen
- Builder: Bremer Vulkan
- Launched: 16 December 1937
- Identification: Code Letters DOTP
- Fate: Requisitioned by Kriegsmarine, 1939

Nazi Germany
- Operator: Kriegsmarine
- Builder: DeSchiMAG
- Yard number: 2
- Commissioned: 19 December 1939
- Renamed: Atlantis, 1939
- Reclassified: Auxiliary cruiser, 1939
- Nickname(s): HSK-2; Schiff 16; Raider-C
- Fate: Sunk by HMS Devonshire in the South Atlantic, 22 November 1941

General characteristics
- Type: Merchant raider
- Tonnage: 7,862 gross register tons (GRT); 4,845 NRT
- Displacement: 17,600 t (17,300 long tons)
- Length: 155 m (509 ft)
- Beam: 18.7 m (61 ft)
- Draught: 8.7 m (29 ft)
- Installed power: 7,600 hp (5,700 kW)
- Propulsion: 2 × 6-cylinder diesel engines; 1 × shaft
- Speed: 17.5 kn (32.4 km/h; 20.1 mph)
- Range: 60,000 nmi (110,000 km; 69,000 mi) at 10 kn (19 km/h; 12 mph)
- Endurance: 250 days
- Complement: 349–351
- Armament: 6 × 15 cm (5.9 in) SK L/45; 1 × 75 mm (3 in) gun; 2 × twin 3.7 cm (1.5 in) SK C/30; 2 × twin 2 cm (0.79 in) C/30 cannons; 4 × 53.3 cm torpedo tubes; 93 × mines
- Aircraft carried: 2 × Heinkel He 114C

The German auxiliary cruiser Atlantis (HSK 2), known to the Kriegsmarine as Schiff 16 and to the Royal Navy as Raider-C, was a converted German Hilfskreuzer or merchant or commerce raider of the Kriegsmarine, which, in World War II, travelled more than 161,000 km (100,000 mi) in 602 days, and sank or captured 22 ships with a combined tonnage of 144,384. Atlantis was commanded by Kapitän zur See Bernhard Rogge, who received the Oak Leaves to the Knight's Cross of the Iron Cross. She was sunk on 22 November 1941 by the British cruiser HMS Devonshire.

Commerce raiders do not seek to engage warships, but rather attack enemy merchant shipping; the measures of success are tonnage destroyed (or captured) and time spent at large. Atlantis was second only to Pinguin in tonnage destroyed, and had the longest raiding career of any German commerce raider in either world war. She captured highly secret documents from Automedon. A version of the story of Atlantis is told in the film Under Ten Flags with Van Heflin appearing as Captain Rogge.

== Early history ==
Built by Bremer Vulkan in 1937, she began her career as the cargo ship Goldenfels, owned and operated by DDG Hansa, Bremen. Goldenfels was powered by two Six-cylinder Single Cycle Double Action diesel engines, built by Bremer Vulkan. She was allocated the Code Letters DOTP. In late 1939 she was requisitioned by the Kriegsmarine and converted into a warship by DeSchiMAG, Bremen. In December 1939, she was commissioned as the commerce raider Atlantis.

== Design ==
Atlantis was 155 m (509 ft) long and displaced 17,600 t (17,300 long tons). She had a single funnel amidships. She had a crew of 349 (21 officers and 328 enlisted sailors) and a Scottish Terrier, Ferry, as mascot. The cruiser carried a dummy funnel and variable-height masts. A stock of paint, canvas, and materials was carried to alter her appearance, including costumes for the crew and flags. Atlantis was capable of being modified to twenty-six different silhouettes.

=== Weapons and aircraft ===
The ship was equipped with six 150 mm (5.9 in) guns, one 75 mm (3.0 in) gun on the bow, two twin-37 mm anti-aircraft guns and four 20 mm automatic cannons; all of these were hidden, mostly behind pivotable false deck or side structures. A phony crane and deckhouse on the aft section hid two of the 150 mm (5.9 in) guns; the other four guns were concealed via flaps in the side that were raised when action was imminent. Atlantis also had four waterline torpedo tubes, and a 92-mine compartment. This gave her the firepower and more importantly the fire control, of a light cruiser. The ship also carried two Heinkel He-114C seaplanes in one of its holds, one of these was fully assembled and the other one was packed away in crates. The Heinkel was later replaced at sea with the smaller Arado Ar 196.

=== Engines ===
Atlantis had two 6-cylinder diesel engines, which powered a single propeller. Top speed was 17.5 kn (32.4 km/h; 20.1 mph) and a range of 60,000 mi (97,000 km) at 10 kn (19 km/h; 12 mph). Diesel engines allowed her to drift when convenient to conserve fuel and, unlike steam machinery, instantly restart her powerplant.

== Service history ==
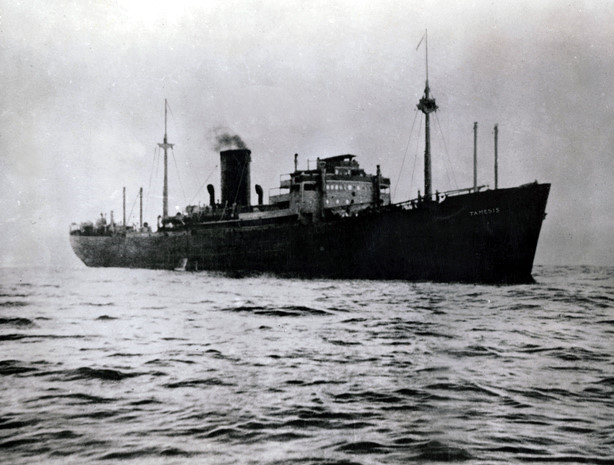
Atlantis disguised as Tamesis, 1940.

=== Journey to the South Atlantic ===
In 1939, she became the command of Kapitän Bernhard Rogge. Commissioned in mid-December, she was the first of nine or ten merchant ships armed by Nazi Germany for the purposes of seeking out and engaging enemy cargo vessels. Atlantis was delayed by ice until 31 March 1940, when the former battleship Hessen was sent to act as an icebreaker, clearing the way for Atlantis, Orion, and Widder.. Weather information was supplied to Atlantis by the weather ships WBS 3 Fritz Homann, WBS 4 Hinrich Freese and WBS 5 Adolf Vinnen.

Atlantis headed past the North Sea minefields, between Norway and Britain, across the Arctic Circle, between Iceland and Greenland, and headed south. By this time, Atlantis was pretending to be a Soviet vessel named Kim by flying the Soviet naval ensign, displaying a hammer and sickle on the bridge, and having Russian and English warnings on the stern, "Keep clear of propellers". The Soviet Union was neutral at the time.

After crossing the equator, on 24–25 April, she took the guise of the Japanese vessel Kasii Maru. The ship now displayed a large K upon a red-topped funnel, identification of the K Line transportation company. She also had rising sun symbols on the gun flaps and Japanese characters (copied from a magazine) on the aft hull.

=== City of Exeter ===
On 2 May, she met the British passenger liner SS City of Exeter. Rogge, unwilling to cause non-combatant casualties, declined to attack. Once the ships had parted, Exeter's Master radioed his suspicions about the "Japanese" ship to the Royal Navy.

=== Scientist ===
On 3 May, Atlantis met a British cargo ship, Scientist, which was carrying ore and jute. The Germans raised their battle ensign and displayed signal pennants stating, "Stop or I fire! Don't use your radio!" The 75 mm (3.0 in) gun fired a warning shot. The British immediately began transmitting their alarm signal, "QQQQ...QQQQ...Unidentified merchantman has ordered me to stop", and the Germans began transmitting so as to jam the signals.

Scientist turned to flee, but on the second salvo from Atlantis flames exploded from the ship, followed by a cloud of dust and then white steam from the boilers. A British sailor was killed and the remaining 77 were taken as prisoners of war. After failing to sink the ship with demolition charges, Atlantis used guns and a torpedo to finish off Scientist.

=== Cape Agulhas ===
Continuing to sail south, Atlantis passed the Cape of Good Hope, reaching Cape Agulhas on 10 May. Here she set up a minefield with 92 horned contact naval mines, in a way which suggested that a U-boat had laid them. The minefield was successful, but the deception was foiled and the ship's presence revealed by a German propaganda broadcast boasting that "a minefield, sown by a German raider" had sunk no fewer than eight merchant ships, three more were overdue, three minesweepers were involved, and the Royal Navy was not capable of finding "a solitary raider" operating in "its own back yard". Furthermore, a British signal was sent from Ceylon on 20 May and intercepted by Germany, based on the report from City of Exeter, warning shipping of a German raider disguised as a Japanese ship.

Atlantis headed into the Indian Ocean disguised as the Dutch vessel MV Abbekerk. She received a broadcast—which happened to be incorrect—reporting that Abbekerk had been sunk, but retained that identity rather than repainting, as there were several similar Dutch vessels.

=== Tirranna, City of Bagdad, and the Kemmendine ===
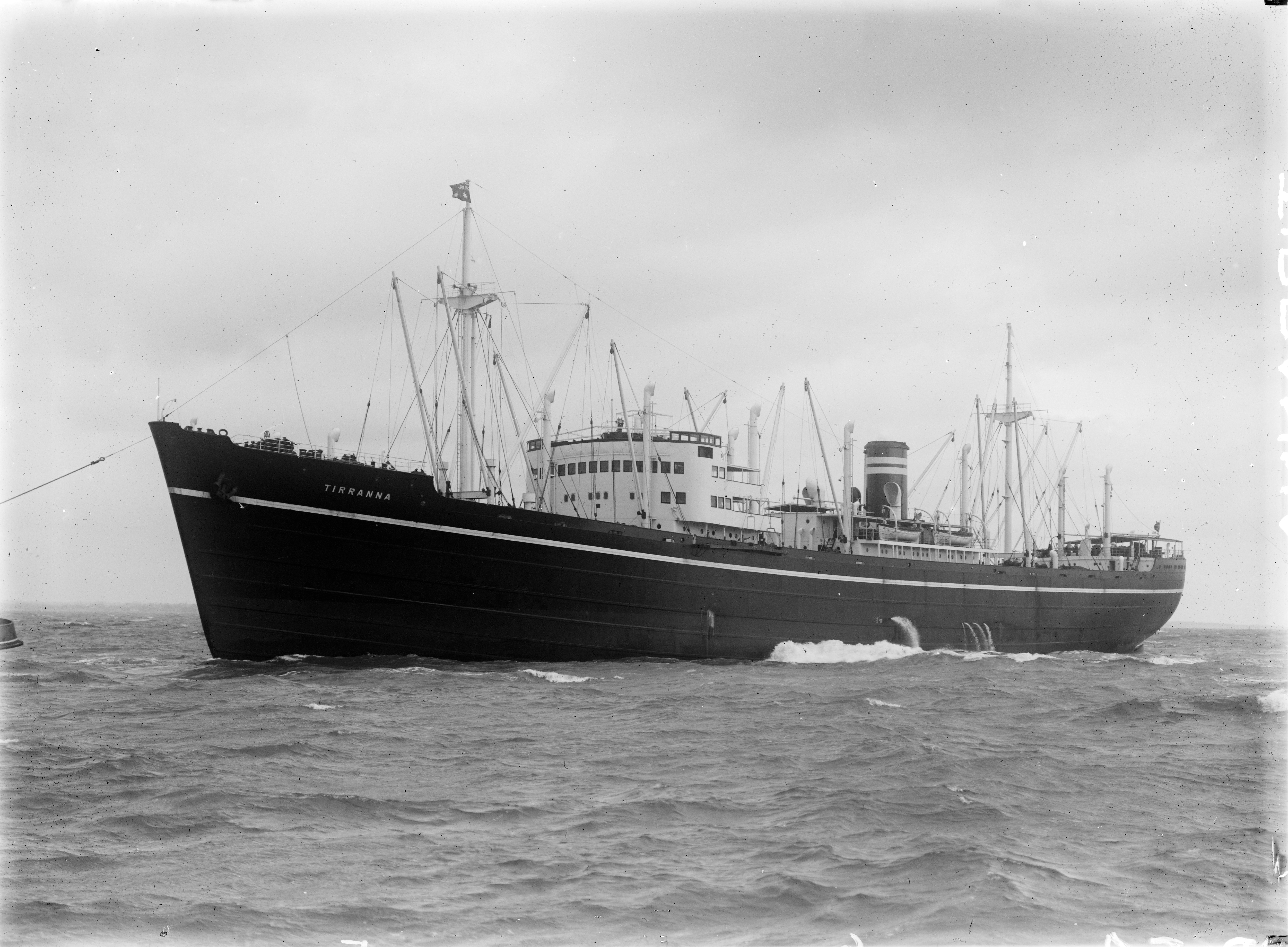
Tirranna

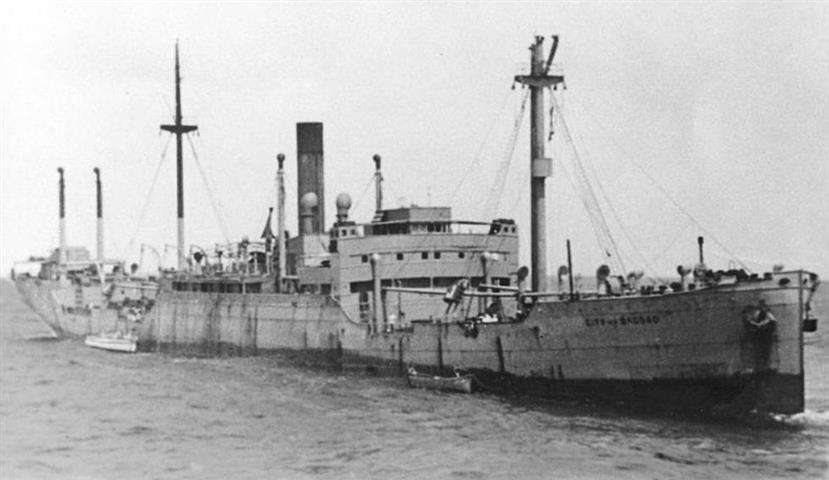
City of Bagdad

On 10 June 1940, Atlantis stopped the Norwegian motor ship Tirranna with 30 salvos of fire after a three-hour chase. Five members of Tirranna's crew were killed and others wounded. Filled with supplies for Australian troops in the Middle East, Tirranna was captured and sent to France.

On 11 July, the liner City of Bagdad was fired upon at a range of 1.2 km (0.75 mi). A boarding party discovered a copy of Broadcasting for Allied Merchant Ships, which contained communications codes. City of Baghdad, like Atlantis, was a former DDG Hansa ship, having been passed to the British after World War I as reparations. A copy of the report sent by City of Exeter was found, describing Atlantis in minute detail and including a photograph of the similar Freienfels, confirming that the "Japanese" identity had not been believed. Rogge had his ship's profile altered, adding two new masts.

At 10:09 on 13 July, Atlantis encountered another Freighter, Kemmendine, which was heading for Burma. The crew on the Kemmendine opened fire on Atlantis with a 3-inch gun mounted on Kemmendine's stern. Atlantis returned fire, and Kemmendine was quickly ablaze. All the crew were taken off Kemmendine, and Kemmendine was then sunk.

=== Talleyrand and King City ===
In August, Atlantis sank Talleyrand, the sister ship of Tirranna. Then she encountered King City, carrying coal, which was mistaken for a British Q-Ship due to its erratic maneuvering caused by mechanical difficulties. Three shells from Atlantis destroyed King City's bridge, killing four merchant cadets and a cabin boy. Another wounded sailor later died on the operating table aboard Atlantis.

=== Athelking, Benarty, Commissaire Ramel, Durmitor, Teddy, and Ole Jacob ===
In September, Atlantis sank Athelking, Benarty and Commissaire Ramel. All of these were sunk only after supplies, documents, and POWs were taken. In October, the Germans took the Yugoslavian steamboat Durmitor, loaded with a cargo of salt. Yugoslavia was neutral at the time, but Captain Rogge was desperate for an opportunity for Atlantis to get rid of the POWs that had accumulated on board, so the ship was captured because it had been carrying coal from Cardiff to Oran before its current voyage. Captured documents and 260 POWs were transferred to Durmitor, which, with a prize crew of 14 Germans commanded by Lt. Dehnel, was dispatched to Italian-controlled Mogadishu. Lacking sufficient fuel, the Durmitor resorted to sails and, after a "hellish" voyage, made landfall in Warsheikh, north of Mogadishu, on 22 November, five weeks after departure.

In the second week of November, two Norwegian tankers: Teddy and Ole Jacob were seized by Atlantis. On both occasions, Atlantis presented itself as HMS Antenor.

=== Automedon and her secret cargo ===
At about 07:00 on 11 November 1940, Atlantis encountered the Blue Funnel Line cargo ship Automedon about 250 mi (400 km) northwest of Sumatra. At 08:20, Atlantis fired a warning shot across Automedon's bow, and her radio officer at once began transmitting a distress call of "RRRR – Automedon – 0416N" ("RRRR" meant "under attack by armed raider").

At a range of around 2,000 yd (1,800 m), Atlantis shelled Automedon, ceasing fire after three minutes in which she had destroyed her bridge, accommodation, and lifeboats. Six crew members were killed and twelve injured.

The Germans boarded the stricken ship and broke into the strong room, where they found fifteen bags of Top Secret mail for the British Far East Command, including a large quantity of decoding tables, fleet orders, gunnery instructions, and naval intelligence reports. After wasting an hour breaking open the ship's safe only to discover "a few shillings in cash", a search of the Automedon's chart room found a small weighted green bag marked "Highly Confidential" containing the Chief of Staff's report to the Commander in Chief Far East, Robert Brooke Popham. The bag was supposed to be thrown overboard if there was risk of loss, but the personnel responsible for this had been killed or incapacitated. The report contained the latest assessment of the Japanese Empire's military strength in the Far East, along with details of Royal Air Force units, naval strength, and notes on Singapore's defences. It painted a gloomy picture of British land and naval capabilities in the Far East, and declared that Britain was too weak to risk war with Japan.

Automedon was sunk at 15:07. Rogge soon realised the importance of the intelligence material he had captured and quickly transferred the documents to the recently acquired prize vessel Ole Jacob, ordering Lieutenant Commander Paul Kamenz and six of his crew to take charge of the vessel. After an uneventful voyage they arrived in Kobe, Japan, on 4 December 1940.

The mail reached the German Embassy in Tokyo on 5 December. The German Naval attaché Paul Wenneker had the summary of the British plan wired to Berlin, while the original was hand-carried by Kamenz to Berlin via the Trans-Siberian Railway. A copy was given to the Japanese, to whom it provided valuable intelligence prior to their commencing hostilities against the Western Powers. Rogge was rewarded for this with an ornate katana; the only other Germans so honoured were Hermann Göring and Field Marshal Erwin Rommel.

After reading the captured Chief of Staff report, on 7 January 1941 Japanese Admiral Yamamoto wrote to the Naval Minister asking whether, if Japan knocked out America, the remaining British and Dutch forces would be suitably weakened for the Japanese to deliver a death blow; the Automedon intelligence on the weakness of the British Empire is thus credibly linked with the Japanese attack on Pearl Harbor and the attack leading to the fall of Singapore.

=== At Kerguelen and Africa ===
In the Christmas period Atlantis was at Kerguelen Island in the Indian Ocean, where she was replenished by the MV Alstertor. There the crewmen did maintenance and replenished their water supplies. The ship's complement suffered its first fatality when a sailor, named Bernhard Herrmann, fell while painting the funnel. He was buried in what is sometimes referred to as "the southernmost of all German war graves".

In late January 1941, off the eastern coast of Africa, Atlantis sank the British ship Mandasor and captured Speybank. Then, on 2 February, the Norwegian tanker Ketty Brøvig was relieved of her fuel. The fuel was used not only for the German raider, but also to refuel the German cruiser Admiral Scheer and, on 29 March the Italian submarine Perla. Perla was making its way from the port of Massawa in Italian East Africa, around the Cape of Good Hope, to Bordeaux in France. Rogge wrote in his memoirs that, after seeing the small coastal submarine and its emaciated crew, he told the commander, Lt. Bruno Napp, his perplexity about his mission and suggested him to reach either Brazil or Argentina to be interned; by his account, Napp politely rejected the advice, telling that he would do his utmost to obey his orders, much to Rogge's admiration.

=== Zamzam ===
By April, Atlantis had returned to the Atlantic where, on April 17, Rogge mistook the Egyptian liner Zamzam for a British liner being used as a troop ship or Q-ship. She was in fact the former Bibby Liner Leicestershire. Atlantis opened fire at a range of 8.4 km (5.2 mi). The second salvo hit and the wireless room was destroyed; 202 passengers and about 140 members of the crew were captured. The passengers included missionaries, ambulance drivers, Fortune magazine editor Charles J.V. Murphy, and Life magazine photographer David E. Scherman. The Germans let Scherman take photographs. They seized most of his films when the prisoners returned to Europe aboard the German blockade runner Dresden, but he smuggled four rolls back to New York. The photos later helped the Royal Navy to identify and destroy Atlantis. Murphy's account of the incident and Scherman's photos appeared in the 23 June 1941 issue of Life.

=== Post-Bismarck ===
After the Bismarck was sunk, the North Atlantic swarmed with British warships. As a result, Rogge decided to abandon the original plan to go back to Germany and instead returned to the Pacific. En route, Atlantis encountered and sank the British ships Rabaul, Trafalgar, Tottenham, and Balzac. On 10 September 1941, east of New Zealand, Atlantis captured the Norwegian motor vessel Silvaplana.

Atlantis then patrolled the South Pacific, initially in French Polynesia between the Tubuai Islands and Tuamotu Archipelago. Without the knowledge of French authorities, the Germans landed on Vanavana Island and traded with the inhabitants. They then hunted Allied shipping in the area between Pitcairn and uninhabited Henderson islands, making a landing on Henderson Island. The seaplane from Atlantis made several fruitless reconnaissance flights. Atlantis headed back to the Atlantic on 19 October, and rounded Cape Horn ten days later.

=== U-68, U-126, and HMS Devonshire ===
On 18 October 1941 Rogge was ordered to rendezvous with the submarine U-68 800 km (500 mi) south of St. Helena and refuel her, then to refuel U-126 at a location north of Ascension Island. Atlantis rendezvoused with U-68 on 13 November, and on 21 or 22 November with U-126. The OKM (German Naval High Command) signal instruction sent to U-126 ordering this rendezvous was intercepted and deciphered by the Allied Enigma code breakers at Bletchley Park and was passed on to the Admiralty, which in turn despatched the heavy cruiser HMS Devonshire to the rendezvous area.

== Sinking ==
Atlantis met with U-126 in the early morning on 22 November 1941, and started immediately with refueling and resupplying the U-boat. The captain of U-126, Kapitänleutnant Ernst Bauer, one more of its four officers and six more crewman came aboard Atlantis. Usually Atlantis would fly off her Arado seaplane to cover the operation, but the seaplane was not operational on this day. They were detected by the scouting Walrus seaplane of Devonshire, and the British cruiser surprised the Germans at 08:15. U-126 dived at once without the missing crewmembers and was not able to mount an attack. The Devonshire manoeuvred at high speed in order to avoid possible attacks by the sighted U-boat and kept outside the range of the 150 mm (5.9 in) guns of Atlantis, which she could outrange with her larger 8 in (203 mm) battery. At 08.37 the British cruiser fired two warning salvoes and in response Atlantis transmitted a raider report posing as the Dutch ship Polyphemus. By 09:34, Devonshire had received confirmation this report was false. She fired 30 salvoes and started scoring hits with her third salvo. At 09:58 the fore magazine exploded and at 10:16 the order was given to scuttle the ship. Seven sailors were killed and two more died of their wounds later. After Devonshire left the area, U-126 resurfaced and picked up 300 German sailors and a wounded American prisoner. U-126 carried or towed rafts towards the still-neutral Brazil (1,500 km (930 mi) west). Two days later the German refuelling ship Python arrived and took the survivors aboard.

On 1 December, while Python was replenishing U-126 and UA, another of the British cruisers seeking the raiders, HMS Dorsetshire, appeared. U-126 was in the process of taking on torpedoes and was not operational. The boat could dive but not attack. UA launched five torpedoes but missed the British cruiser. The Dorsetshire fired two warning shots and Python's crew scuttled her. Dorsetshire departed, leaving the U-boats to recover the survivors. Each submarine took about 100 survivors aboard, half of them below decks and the other half on deck. 200 survivors were put in ten lifeboats which were towed by the submarines. The two other German submarines U-124 and U-129 which were also operating in the South-Atlantic were ordered to assist the rescue operation. U-129 arrived on 3 December and U-124 arrived two days later. These two U-boats took the people from the lifeboats on board. Then the Germans turned to the Italians for assistance since they also operated submarines in the Atlantic. Between 14 and 18 December in the Cap Verde region the four big Italian submarines Enrico Tazzoli, Pietro Calvi, Giuseppe Finzi and Luigi Torelli took 260 Germans aboard so that all survivors had a place below decks and the U-boats were able to dive again. All eight submarines managed to return safely to St Nazaire, the last one arriving on 29 December.

== Raiding career ==
Ships sunk or captured by Atlantis
Name	Type	Nationality	Date	Tonnage	Fate
Scientist	Freighter	United Kingdom	3 May 1940	6,200 t	Sunk
Tirranna	Freighter	Norway	10 June 1940	7,230 t	Captured
City of Bagdad	Freighter	United Kingdom	11 July 1940	7,505 t	Sunk
Kemmendine	Freighter	United Kingdom	13 July 1940	7,770 t	Sunk
Talleyrand	Motor vessel	Norway	2 August 1940	6,730 t	Sunk
King City	Freighter	United Kingdom	24 August 1940	4,745 t	Sunk
Athelking	Tanker	United Kingdom	9 September 1940	9,550 t	Sunk
Benarty	Freighter	United Kingdom	10 September 1940	5,800 t	Sunk
Commissaire Ramel	Passenger liner	France	20 September 1940	10,060 t	Sunk
Durmitor	Freighter	Yugoslavia	22 October 1940	5,620 t	Captured
Teddy	Tanker	Norway	9 November 1940	6,750 t	Sunk
Ole Jacob	Tanker	Norway	10 November 1940	8,305 t	Captured
Automedon	Freighter	United Kingdom	11 November 1940	7,530 t	Sunk
Mandasor	Freighter	United Kingdom	24 January 1941	5,145 t	Sunk
Speybank	Freighter	United Kingdom	31 January 1941	5,150 t	Captured
Ketty Brøvig	Freighter	Norway	2 February 1941	7,300 t	Captured
Zamzam	Passenger liner	Egypt	17 April 1941	8,300 t	Sunk
Rabaul	Freighter	United Kingdom	14 May 1941	6,810 t	Sunk
Trafalgar	Freighter	United Kingdom	24 May 1941	4,530 t	Sunk
Tottenham	Freighter	United Kingdom	17 June 1941	4,760 t	Sunk
Balzac	Freighter	United Kingdom	23 June 1941	5,375 t	Sunk
Silvaplana	Motor vessel	Norway	10 September 1941	4,790 t	Captured
Total:				145,960 t	
