= Dave O'Donoghue =

Australian rules footballer

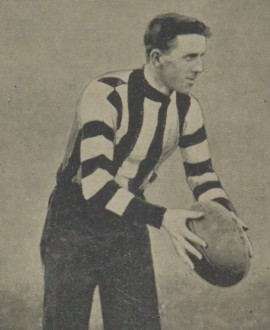
- O'Donoghue in 1910

Personal information
- Full name: David Flynn O'Donoghue
- Born: 11 July 1885; Bellarine, Victoria
- Died: 25 August 1960 (aged 75); Malvern, Victoria
- Original team: Northcote
- Height: 179 cm (5 ft 10 in)
- Weight: 81 kg (179 lb)

Playing career^{1}
Years	Club	Games (Goals)
1907–11	Collingwood	53 (0)
- ^{1} Playing statistics correct to the end of 1911.

David Flynn O'Donoghue (11 July 1885 – 25 August 1960) was an Australian rules footballer who played with Collingwood in the Victorian Football League (VFL).
