= Robert Wagner (chemist) =

Dr. Robert Wagner was an industrial chemist who became an S.D. and Gestapo officer in Vienna, Austria, during the Second World War. He was the figure behind the "Von Pott Group", organised by the sculptor Lisa von Pott, to spy on anyone suspected of helping the Allies or having pro-Allied sentiment in Vienna and the ultimate destination of intelligence collected by the group.

== Career ==
Wagner was employed by Chemosanwerken and later by Heilmittelwerke, both of Vienna. He subsequently became an SD and Gestapo officer in the city during the Second World War. As part of his duties he funded an espionage operation in Vienna that was organised by the sculptor Lisa von Pott and later known to the British as the "Von Pott Group". The aim of the group was to spy on anyone in the city suspected of helping the Allies or expressing pro-Allied sentiment.

Records of the British security services describe some of his activities carried out in conjunction with von Pott:

- He introduced Frau Schoen to the economist Dr Kogerer for whom she worked as a secretary. Kogerer and his wife were both subsequently denounced to the Gestapo and interrogated with information that the British thought could only have come from Schoen. They were sent to Mauthausen concentration camp and not heard from again.
- His friend Hans Kaufman, a member of the Nazi party, posed as a communist.
- He and von Pott recruited Susan Sweney, a British pro-Nazi broadcaster and journalist, to work for them spying on targets they selected in Vienna. Wagner met Sweney weekly at her lodgings with the pro-Nazi Luze Krimann and paid von Pott who then paid Sweney.

The Gestapo interrogators Foppelt, Berger, Eduard Tucek, and Scmiedel were closely associated with von Pott and Wagner.
