= David O'Donoghue (historian) =

Irish journalist and historian

David O'Donoghue (born 1952) is an Irish journalist and historian who has written two books on Irish-German relations during the Second World War. He has also worked as a journalist for RTÉ and for Agence France-Presse in Paris. He has a PhD from Dublin City University.

== Selected publications ==
- Line of Fire: Journeys Through a Media Minefield (memoir, Orpen Press, Dublin, 2022).
- The Irish Army in the Congo 1960-1964: The Far Battalions. Dublin, 2005.
- "Army's Congo Mission Casts a Long Shadow", Irish Studies in International Affairs, Vol. 17 (2006), pp. 43–59.
- The Devil’s Deal: The IRA, Nazi Germany and the double life of Jim O’Donovan. Dublin, 2010.
- Hitler's Irish Voices: The story of German radio's wartime Irish service. Somerville Press, Bantry, 2014, second edition. (First edition published 1998, Beyond the Pale, Belfast).

ISBN 9780992736408
