= Deutscher Fichte-Bund =

German propaganda agency

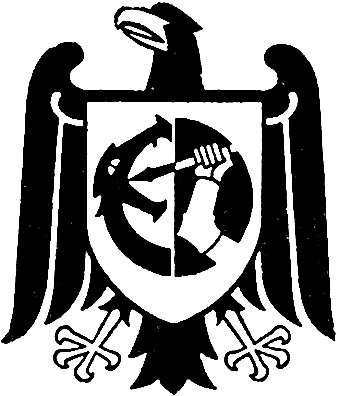
Emblem of the Deutscher Fichte-Bund

The Deutscher Fichte-Bund (German Fichte Federation), often just called Fichte-Bund, was a German propaganda agency based in Hamburg. It was founded on 29 January 1914 as the "Reichsbund für Deutschtumsarbeit" (Reich Federation for German Studies) by Heinrich Kessemeier and named after the philosopher Johann Gottlieb Fichte, a founder of the German Idealist movement. Later it was under the directorship of Heinrich's son Theodore Kessemeier.

== Goals ==
According to a Danish memorandum that existed in the Nuremberg trial against the chief war criminals, the Fichte-Bund was directly subordinate to the Reich Ministry of Public Enlightenment and Propaganda during the Third Reich and tried to systematically influence public opinion in favor of the National Socialism. In this memorandum, the goals of the Fichte Federation for the period after 1933 are cited:

- "Promotion of mutual understanding through free publication of information about the new Germany" and
- "Protection of culture and civilization by spreading the truth about the destructive forces in the world".

== Activities prior to 1933 ==
A work report from 1940 shows that the association distributed over 18,276,000 of its own pamphlets from 1919 to 1932, the period of the Weimar Republic. The topics of these leaflets are:

- The ignominy of the occupation of Germany
- Looting and reparations
- The lie of German war guilt
- Disarmament sham
- Deception of German workers and Marxism

== Activities from 1933 to 1940 ==
In the years between 1933 and 1940, the association published 54,295,000 pamphlets in 16 languages. Topics are:

- Education abroad about the "new Germany"
- The new hate and horror lies
- The war and boycott baiting
- Bolshevism
- Jewish manipulation
- Heroes' Memorial Day in Greater Germany (1940) (in danish; Helte-Mindedag i Stortyskland, kernestykket i Førerens tale)

The association financed the Dutch monthly "The Foghorn" (De Misthorn). In 1940 the association also sent “2,278,241 pieces of propaganda material”, which the Foreign Office (Unit D IV) had made available. In addition to brochures, this also included books, records and unabridged speeches. The association printed 6,201,000 leaflets. In addition, 49,300 daily newspapers and 25,900 kg of material were sent abroad via main distribution points in Hamburg, Vienna, Prague and Biarritz.

The Deutscher Fichte-Bund used its distribution system, which had been tried and tested before the war. In various river and sea ports the propaganda material was secretly handed over to ship captains, ship officers and customs border guards who made it abroad and delivered it to shop stewards. For 1940, the source lists a total of 693 transports, mostly of German ships, which brought propaganda material to the countries bordering the Baltic Sea, to Spain, and to occupied France.
