= Kemmendine (ship) =

British merchant ship sunk in WWII

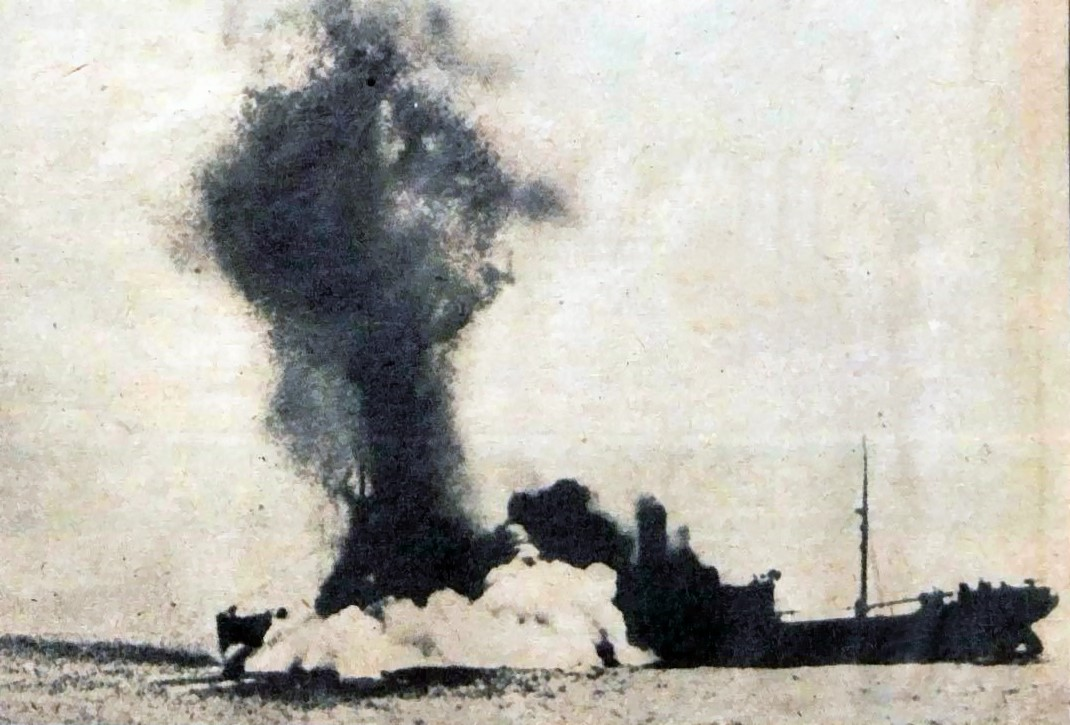
The destruction of the British ship Kemmendine by the German raider Atlantis, July 1940.

The Kemmendine (1924) was a British merchant ship. She was sunk by the German merchant raider Atlantis in the Indian Ocean on 13 July 1940, en route from Glasgow to Burma. Records relating to the ship are held by the British National Archives.
