= List of shipwrecks in 1929 =

The list of shipwrecks in 1929 includes ships sunk, foundered, grounded, or otherwise lost during 1929.

table of contents
1929
Jan	Feb	Mar	Apr
May	Jun	Jul	Aug
Sep	Oct	Nov	Dec
Unknown date

== January ==
=== 2 January ===
List of shipwrecks: 2 January 1929
Ship	State	Description
Malakoff	France	The cargo ship struck rocks and foundered in the Mediterranean Sea off Cape Artruitx, Menorca, Spain with the loss of 27 of her 33 passengers and crew.
The Sultan	United Kingdom	The cargo ship ran aground at Ouistreham, Calvados, France. She was refloated on 7 January.

=== 3 January ===
List of shipwrecks: 3 January 1929
Ship	State	Description
Toyotomi Maru	Japan	The cargo ship foundered in the East China Sea off Sasebo, Nagasaki with the loss of all but four of her crew.

=== 4 January ===
List of shipwrecks: 4 January 1929
Ship	State	Description
Ella Eff	Denmark	The schooner foundered in the Atlantic Ocean off the coast of Surinam. Her crew survived.
Geddle Braes	United Kingdom	The auxiliary sailing vessel was wrecked in the North Sea on the Middle Muck Sands, off the coast of Moray. All four crew survived.
Kobun Maru	Japan	The cargo ship suffered a failure of her sea valve and was abandoned off the Japanese coast. All crew were rescued by another vessel.

=== 5 January ===
List of shipwrecks: 5 January 1929
Ship	State	Description
Philip Hoffman	United States	The tug collided with Siboney (United States) in the East River, New York and sank, as did the scow she was towing. Two crew were rescued.

=== 7 January ===
List of shipwrecks: 7 January 1929
Ship	State	Description
Idaho	United Kingdom	The cargo ship ran aground at Aberdeen. She was refloated on 17 July.
Ooriva	United Kingdom	The cargo ship collided with Walton Hall (United Kingdom) in the River Hooghly, India and sank.
Roedelheim	Germany	The cargo ship foundered in the Atlantic Ocean. All crew were rescued by Saguache (United States).

=== 9 January ===
List of shipwrecks: 9 January 1929
Ship	State	Description
Falterona	Italy	The cargo ship came ashore south of Cap Gris Nez, Pas-de-Calais, France and broke up. She was refloated on 12 July and brought into Boulogne for scrapping.

=== 11 January ===
List of shipwrecks: 11 January 1929
Ship	State	Description
Berbice	United Kingdom	The passenger ship ran aground at the mouth of the Weichsel River, a total loss. All 83 people on board were rescued. She was on a voyage from Liepāja, Latvia to Gdynia, Poland.
Dione	Germany	The cargo ship collided with Osmed (Sweden) in the English Channel off the Goodwin Sands, Kent. She was beached at St. Margaret's Bay but was later refloated and towed into Dover.
President Adams	United States	The ocean liner ran aground off Toro Point, Panama. The passengers were taken off. She was refloated a few days later.

=== 14 January ===
List of shipwrecks: 14 January 1929
Ship	State	Description
Baltara	United Kingdom	The passenger ship ran aground at Schlewenhorst, Danzig and was wrecked. All on board were rescued. She broke in two and was a total loss.
West Vlaanderen	Netherlands	The cargo ship collided with Dunston (United Kingdom) in the River Thames at Erith, Kent, United Kingdom and was beached She was refloated later that day.

=== 15 January ===
List of shipwrecks: 15 January 1929
Ship	State	Description
Skolma	Norway	The cargo ship ran aground on Bornholm, Denmark and broke in two.
Vineta	Finland	The sailing vessel came ashore south of Visby, Gotland, Sweden and was wrecked. Her crew were rescued.

=== 16 January ===
List of shipwrecks: 16 January 1929
Ship	State	Description
Hsin Wah	China	The passenger ship ran aground at Waglan with the loss of over 400 lives.
Rosa Maris	United Kingdom	The 117.5-foot (35.8 m), 246-ton steam trawler was wrecked on Red Rocks, off Hatamul, east of the Sound of Eriskay in a heavy gale, a total loss. The crew used her boat to get to the drifter Immaculate (United Kingdom).

=== 18 January ===
List of shipwrecks: 18 January 1929
Ship	State	Description
Rose Ann Belliveau	Canada	The schooner ran aground in St Mary's Bay, Nova Scotia.

=== 19 January ===
List of shipwrecks: 19 January 1929
Ship	State	Description
Marie	Germany	The cargo ship ran aground at Åhus, Skåne County, Sweden and then sank. She was refloated on 25 January.

=== 20 January ===
List of shipwrecks: 20 January 1929
Ship	State	Description
George Cochran	United Kingdom	The coaster departed Sydney, Cape Breton, Nova Scotia, Canada for St. John's, Newfoundland. No further trace, presumed foundered with the loss of all hands.
President Garfield	United States	The ocean liner ran aground on the Matanilla Reef, Bahamas. Her passengers were taken off by Pan America (United States). She was refloated on 23 January.
Teesbridge	United Kingdom	The cargo ship foundered in the Atlantic Ocean 300 nautical miles (560 km) south east of Cape Race, Newfoundland, with the loss of all 30 crew.

=== 21 January ===
List of shipwrecks: 21 January 1929
Ship	State	Description
Raby Castle	United Kingdom	The cargo ship ran agroung on Golo Island, Philippines. She was refloated on 23 January.
Uniluco	United States	The 17-gross register ton, 37.5-foot (11.4 m) fishing vessel was destroyed off Gravina Island in the Alexander Archipelago in Southeast Alaska by a fire that started in her engine room when her gasoline engine backfired. The only person on board abandoned ship and survived.

=== 22 January ===
List of shipwrecks: 22 January 1929
Ship	State	Description
Arcangelo	Italy	The cargo ship suffered an explosion and fire and was beached at Buenos Aires, Argentina.
Coaster	United States	After the 14-gross register ton motor vessel grounded stern-first as the tide fell while her crew unloaded her on the coast of Southeast Alaska six nautical miles (11 km) west of Tenakee Springs, Territory of Alaska, her bilge water ran down into her bow, where a stove in her forecastle ignited oil floating on the bilge water′s surface, causing an explosion which blew her entire crew of three overboard. Her crew survived, but a fire that followed the explosion burned her hull to the waterline. She was a total loss.
Florida	Italy	The cargo ship foundered in the Atlantic Ocean 700 nautical miles (1,300 km) off the Virginia Capes, United States (38°05′N 60°12′W). The crew were rescued by the passenger liner America (United States).

=== 23 January ===
List of shipwrecks: 23 January 1929
Ship	State	Description
Penelope	United Kingdom	The cargo ship collided with Heathside (United Kingdom) in the Atlantic Ocean (39°13′N 9°39′W) and sank with the loss of two crew.

=== 24 January ===
List of shipwrecks: 24 January 1929
Ship	State	Description
Heng Chong	China	The cargo ship foundered in the East China Sea 16 nautical miles (30 km) north of the Shaweishan Lighthouse, at the mouth of the Yangtze, with the loss of 72 of her 90 crew.

=== 25 January ===
List of shipwrecks: 25 January 1929
Ship	State	Description
Lily	United Kingdom	The trow foundered in the Bristol Channel off Newport, Monmouthshire. Her two crew were rescued by the pilot cutter Nancy (United Kingdom).

=== 28 January ===
List of shipwrecks: 28 January 1929
Ship	State	Description
Enid E. Legge	United Kingdom	The schooner caught fire and was abandoned in the Atlantic Ocean (38°14′N 48°40′W). Her crew survived.
Merauke	Netherlands	The cargo ship collided with Alcyon (Greece) in the English Channel and was beached at Hythe, Kent, United Kingdom. The crew were taken off by Lady Duncannon (United Kingdom). She was refloated on 6 February.

=== 29 January ===
List of shipwrecks: 29 January 1929
Ship	State	Description
Devonian	United Kingdom	The cargo ship ran aground at Bridgeness, West Lothian. She was refloated on 12 March.
Speedy	United Kingdom	The tug was struck by the propeller of City of Cairo (United Kingdom) at Liverpool, Lancashire and sank.

=== 30 January ===
List of shipwrecks: 30 January 1929
Ship	State	Description
Angela	United Kingdom	The auxiliary schooner was wrecked at Valparaíso, Chile.
Alaskan	United States	The cargo ship ran aground off Castle Island, Bermuda. She was refloated on 5 February.
Quaco Queen	United Kingdom	The schooner sprang a leak in the Atlantic Ocean and was abandoned (33°30′N 57°30′W). Her crew were rescued by Manistee (United Kingdom).

=== Unknown date ===
List of shipwrecks: unknown January 1929
Ship	State	Description
Johs Thode	Germany	The trawler stranded on an uninhabited island off Murmansk sometime in January or February. The crew were rescued by Rudyard Kipling (United Kingdom) and transferred to a Soviet gunboat that took them to Murmansk.
Seiner	United States	The 139-foot (42 m) trawler made her daily contact on 18 January but failed to make contact the next day. Wreck located in 2022 and positively identified in July 2025, 125 miles (201 km) from Nantucket, on the eastern edge of the Georges Bank, in approximately 200 feet (61 m) of water, there was a storm at the location on date she went missing. Lost with all 21 hands.

== February ==
=== 1 February ===
List of shipwrecks: 1 February 1929
Ship	State	Description
Charles Schiaffino	France	The cargo ship foundered off Cape Villano, Spain with the loss of a crew member.
Emily H. Patten	United Kingdom	The schooner was abandoned and set on fire in the Atlantic Ocean (32°33′N 41°47′W). Her crew were rescued by Dosina (United Kingdom).

=== 2 February ===
List of shipwrecks: 2 February 1929
Ship	State	Description
American Farmer	United States	The cargo liner ran aground in Cawsand Bay, Cornwall, United Kingdom. Her 21 passengers were landed before she was refloated later that day.
Dafila	United Kingdom	The cargo ship ran aground off Dungeness, Kent. She was refloated on 6 February.
Edward VII	United Kingdom	The 120.7-foot (36.8 m), 231.25-ton steam trawler struck Whale's Back rock in Pentland Firth. She was refloated but grounded on the Buff of Brims reef, Brims Ness. The crew of ten rescued by Thurso lifeboat Sarah Austin. Became a total loss.
Paddington	United Kingdom	The cargo ship collided with Olavus (United Kingdom) in the North Sea 4 nautical miles (7.4 km) north east of Flamborough Head, Yorkshire and sank. All sixteen crew were rescued by Olavus.
Tomp	Soviet Union	The cargo ship ran aground at the north entrance to the Bosporus. She was refloated on 26 February.

=== 3 February ===
List of shipwrecks: 3 February 1929
Ship	State	Description
Malda	United Kingdom	The cargo ship was driven ashore at Beira, Portuguese East Africa in a storm. She was refloated on 9 February.

=== 4 February ===
List of shipwrecks: 4 February 1929
Ship	State	Description
Deister	Germany	The cargo ship ran aground at Porto, Portugal and sank with the loss of all hands.
Seresia	Belgium	The cargo ship ran aground 4 nautical miles (7.4 km) south of Valencia, Spain. She was refloated on 13 February.

=== 5 February ===
List of shipwrecks: 5 February 1929
Ship	State	Description
Arabia	United Kingdom	The schooner caught fire and sank at Halifax, Nova Scotia, Canada.
Glendola	United States	The cargo ship ran aground near Banes, Cuba. She was refloated on 11 February.
Miltiades	Greece	The cargo ship was abandoned off Cape Spartivento, Calabria, Italy after her tow parted. All five crew were rescued by Aquileja (Italy).

=== 6 February ===
List of shipwrecks: 6 February 1929
Ship	State	Description
Bainbridge	United States	The schooner came ashore near Naggs Head, North Carolina and was a total loss.
Vestmar	Norway	The cargo ship foundered in the North Sea 280 nautical miles (520 km) off Aberdeen, United Kingdom. All thirteen crew were rescued by the trawler Sophie Busse (Germany).

=== 7 February ===
List of shipwrecks: 7 February 1929
Ship	State	Description
Albania	Italy	The passenger ship ran aground at Constanţa, Romania. She was refloated on 10 February.

=== 9 February ===
List of shipwrecks: 9 February 1929
Ship	State	Description
Annie M. Miller	Australia	The collier foundered off Sydney Head, New South Wales with the loss of six crew.

=== 11 February ===
List of shipwrecks: 11 February 1929
Ship	State	Description
Kashmir	United Kingdom	The cargo ship collided with Leopold de Wael (Belgium) in the Scheldt at Kruisschans, Belgium and was beached.
Kerguelen	France	The cargo ship ran aground in the Scheldt at Antwerp, Belgium. She was refloated the next day, but the tug Infatigable (France) capsized and sank killing five of her seven crew.
	Belgium	The passenger ferry ran aground in Dover Harbour, Kent and sank. All passengers and crew were rescued. She was refloated on 20 February.

=== 12 February ===
List of shipwrecks: 12 February 1929
Ship	State	Description
A.B.70	Netherlands	The tug foundered in the North Sea off the Haaks Lightship (Netherlands).
Alloway	United States	After her engine failed during a voyage with a cargo of 4,500 tons of lumber from Seattle, Washington, to Yokohama, Japan, on 10 February and the steamer Montauk (United States) took her under tow on 11 February, the 6,113-gross register ton cargo steamer was wrecked on the coast of Ugamak Island in the Aleutian Islands after the towline broke in Unimak Pass during a gale and an attempt to anchor her failed when she dragged her anchor. Her crew of 35 survived, but she broke up on 14 February and became a total loss.
Annie Ahrens	Germany	The cargo ship ran aground on Anholt, Denmark. Her crew were rescued by the icebreaker Lillebjørn (Denmark).
Deventia	United Kingdom	The cargo ship ran aground west of Bold Head, Devon. All crew were rescued.
Highland Pride	United Kingdom	The cargo ship collided with Braa (Norway) in the River Thames at Gravesend, Kent and was beached. She was refloated later that day.

=== 13 February ===
List of shipwrecks: 13 February 1929
Ship	State	Description
Meiyo Maru	Japan	The cargo ship ran aground on Unmak Island, Alaska, United States. She broke in two on 22 February and was a total loss.

=== 14 February ===
List of shipwrecks: 14 February 1929
Ship	State	Description
Edda	Sweden	The cargo ship was rammed by Flynderborg (Denmark) at Methil, Fife, United Kingdom and sank.
Harkaway	Isle of Man	The auxiliary three-masted schooner was destroyed by fire at Maryport, Cumberland, United Kingdom.

=== 15 February ===
List of shipwrecks: 15 February 1929
Ship	State	Description
Jacques Fraibsinet	France	The ship foundered in the Black Sea. All crew and a passenger survived.
Lubrafol	Belgium	The tanker collided with Galicia (Germany) in the Scheldt and was beached. She was refloated later that day.
Novorossisk	Soviet Union	The cargo ship foundered in the Black Sea south of Sozopol. Her crew took to two lifeboats, but one of them was lost.
Preysinnet	France	The cargo ship ran aground in the Black Sea off Kara Burun, Soviet Union. Her crew were rescued.

=== 16 February ===
List of shipwrecks: 16 February 1929
Ship	State	Description
Kingston Jasper	United Kingdom	The 140.4-foot (42.8 m) trawler was wrecked in a blizzard at Meðalland, Iceland. The crew were taken off by breeches buoy.

=== 18 February ===
List of shipwrecks: 18 February 1929
Ship	State	Description
Kanowa	Australia	The cargo liner ran aground in fog, sinking the next day on Cleft Island, Victoria. All on board were rescued by Mackarra (Australia).
Kumu	United Kingdom	The 130-foot (40 m) trawler ran aground on rocks in North Bay, St. Kilda, Scotland, sinking 42 hours later. Crew taken off by "Harry Melling" (United Kingdom).

=== 19 February ===
List of shipwrecks: 19 February 1929
Ship	State	Description
Alsacien	United Kingdom	The passenger ferry came ashore at Dunkerque, Nord, France. All 29 passengers were taken off by a tender. She was refloated the next day.
Geir	Norway	The cargo ship ran aground at Sagres Point, Portugal. She was a total loss.

=== 21 February ===
List of shipwrecks: 21 February 1929
Ship	State	Description
Kumu	United Kingdom	The 129.9-foot (39.6 m), 315-ton steam trawler was stranded at Northbay, St. Kilda, Scotland on the night of 18/19. The crew were taken off by Harry Melling (United Kingdom) who pulled her off and took her under tow, but she sank on 21 February in 20 fathoms (120 ft; 37 m) of water.
Quickstep	United Kingdom	The cargo ship ran aground at Lessoe, Denmark. She was refloated on 8 March.

=== 22 February ===
List of shipwrecks: 22 February 1929
Ship	State	Description
Magdala	United Kingdom	The cargo ship ran aground on Ailsa Craig in the Firth of Forth.

=== 23 February ===
List of shipwrecks: 23 February 1929
Ship	State	Description
Līdums	Latvia	The cargo ship ran aground at Skagen, Denmark. Her crew were taken off. She refloated herself on 24 February and drifted out to sea.
Volos	Germany	The cargo ship ran aground on the Lephtari Rocks, Skiathos, Greece. She was declared a total loss on 16 March.

=== 24 February ===
List of shipwrecks: 24 February 1929
Ship	State	Description
Tamworth	United Kingdom	The cargo ship collided with Arundel (United Kingdom) at Newhaven, Sussex and was beached. She was refloated later that day and found to be severely damaged.

=== 25 February ===
List of shipwrecks: 25 February 1929
Ship	State	Description
Ida Blumenthal	Germany	The cargo ship collided with West Hika (United States) in the Scheldt and was beached at Walsoorden, Netherlands. She was refloated the next day.
Lippe	Germany	The cargo ship collided with Ilvington Court (United Kingdom) in the Scheldt and was beached at Bath, the Netherlands.
Togston	United Kingdom	The cargo ship collided with Media (United Kingdom) in the River Thames at Tilbury, Essex and was beached. She was refloated the next day.

=== 26 February ===
List of shipwrecks: 26 February 1929
Ship	State	Description
Ghattira	Italy	The cargo ship collided with Hatimura (United Kingdom) at Suez, Egypt and sank.

=== 27 February ===
List of shipwrecks: 27 February 1929
Ship	State	Description
Sistos	Greece	The cargo ship ran aground at Tuzla, Constanţa, Romania.

=== 28 February ===
List of shipwrecks: 28 February 1929
Ship	State	Description
Croxteth Hall	United Kingdom	The cargo ship ran aground on the Sandettie Bank, North Sea. She was refloated but subsequently foundered 4 nautical miles (7.4 km) south of the Wandelaar Lightship (Belgium). Her crew were rescued.
Liberty Glo	United States	The Design 1022 cargo ship ran aground off Terneuzen, Netherlands. She was refloated on 2 March.
Saint-Malo	France	The coaster sprang a leak and sank in the English Channel off Barfleur, Manche with the loss of six of her thirteen crew.
Tritonia	United Kingdom	The cargo ship caught fire at Buenaventura, Valle del Cauca, Colombia. She was carrying a cargo of explosives and all but four crew evacuated the ship. She then exploded and sank with the loss of the four crew aboard.

=== Unknown February ===
List of shipwrecks: unknown February 1929
Ship	State	Description
Johs Thode	Germany	The trawler stranded on an uninhabited island off Murmansk sometime in January or February. The crew were rescued by Rudyard Kipling (United Kingdom) and transferred to a Soviet gunboat that took them to Murmansk.

== March ==
=== 1 March ===
List of shipwrecks: 1 March 1929
Ship	State	Description
Alga	Italy	The cargo ship was driven ashore at Trieste, Friuli-Venezia Giulia in a storm. She had been refloated by 7 March.
Asia	Italy	The cargo ship was driven ashore at Trieste in a storm. She had been refloated by 7 March.
Gardenia	Italy	The cargo ship was driven ashore at Trieste in a storm. She had been refloated by 7 March.
Merano	Italy	The cargo ship was driven ashore at Trieste in a storm. She had been refloated by 7 March.
Palacky	Italy	The cargo ship was driven ashore at Trieste in a storm. She had been refloated by 7 March.
Sofia	Italy	The cargo ship was driven ashore at Trieste in a storm. She had been refloated by 7 March.

=== 2 March ===
List of shipwrecks: 2 March 1929
Ship	State	Description
Andreas Stavroudis	Greece	The cargo ship ran aground at Chania, Crete. She was declared a total loss on 5 March.
Skandia	Sweden	The cargo ship struck ice and sank in the Skaggerak 5 nautical miles (9.3 km) off the Hirtsholm Lighthouse. The crew were rescued by Sampo ( Finland).

=== 3 March ===
List of shipwrecks: 3 March 1929
Ship	State	Description
Richard Peck	United States	The passenger ship ran aground in Narragansett Bay. The passengers were taken off by four United States Navy vessels. She was refloated later that day and sailed to Providence, Rhode Island where her passengers were reboarded.
Service	United Kingdom	The tug sank in the River Humber.

=== 5 March ===
List of shipwrecks: 5 March 1929
Ship	State	Description
British Dominion	United Kingdom	The tanker ran aground at Bo'ness, West Lothian. She was refloated on 8 March.
Dunleith	United Kingdom	The coaster ran aground at Ballinacurra, County Cork, Ireland. She was refloated on 8 March.

=== 6 March ===
List of shipwrecks: 6 March 1929
Ship	State	Description
Alfe (or Alf E)	United States	The 11-gross register ton motor vessel broke her moorings in Yakutat Bay on the south-central coast of the Territory of Alaska and washed ashore at Point Carrew (59°33′30″N 139°50′15″W), where she became a complete wreck.

=== 7 March ===
List of shipwrecks: 7 March 1929
Ship	State	Description
Bankoku Maru	Japan	The cargo ship ran aground on Kama Island, Guam. She was declared a total loss on 11 March.
Sujameco	United States	The cargo ship ran aground on the Oregon coast (approximately 44°N 124°W). She was still aground on 9 May.

=== 8 March ===
List of shipwrecks: 8 March 1929
Ship	State	Description
Catford	United Kingdom	The collier was in collision with Picard (France) in the Thames Estuary and was beached off Mucking, Essex.

=== 10 March ===
List of shipwrecks: 10 March 1929
Ship	State	Description
Phoenix VII	United States	The 28-gross register ton 46.4-foot (14.1 m) motor vessel was wrecked on rocks at Driest Point (55°10′40″N 131°36′15″W) on Annette Island in the Alexander Archipelago in Southeast Alaska after her engine broke down during a gale. Her crew survived.

=== 11 March ===
List of shipwrecks: 11 March 1929
Ship	State	Description
Bohol	United States	The passenger ship ran aground on Ticao, Philippines and was wrecked. The passengers were rescued.

=== 12 March ===
List of shipwrecks: 12 March 1929
Ship	State	Description
Lunesdale	United Kingdom	The coaster collided with Melrose (United Kingdom) in the North Sea off the Farne Islands and sank with the loss of four of her seven crew.

=== 13 March ===
List of shipwrecks: 13 March 1929
Ship	State	Description
Esperance	United Kingdom	The barque ran aground at Carteret, Basse Normandie, France and was wrecked.
Giessen	Germany	The cargo ship ran aground on Button Rock off the mouth of the Yangtze, China. She broke in two and was a total loss. The crew were rescued by Khiva (United Kingdom).

=== 14 March ===
List of shipwrecks: 14 March 1929
Ship	State	Description
Lydia Cardell	United Kingdom	The barquentine was in collision with Broadgarth (United Kingdom) in the North Sea off Flamborough Head, Yorkshire and sank. Her crew were rescued by Broadgarth.
Scheldepas	Belgium	The cargo ship struck a submerged wreck in the Mediterranean Sea off Vesta Rock or Plane Island, Tunisia and sank. Her crew were rescued by Tabarka (United Kingdom).

=== 18 March ===
List of shipwrecks: 18 March 1929
Ship	State	Description
Gull Lightship	United Kingdom	The lightship was rammed and sunk in the English Channel off Deal, Kent by City of York (United Kingdom) with the loss of one of her seven crew. Survivors were rescued by the motorboat Lady Beatty and transferred to City of York. Having been refloated, she was beached between Pegwell Bay and Deal on 6 July. She was repaired and entered service as the Brake Lightship (United Kingdom).

=== 20 March ===
List of shipwrecks: 20 March 1929
Ship	State	Description
Sines	Portugal	The cargo ship collided with the trawler Adine (France) in the English Channel off St. Catherine's Point, Isle of Wight (50°27′N 0°35′W) and sank. Her crew were rescued by Adine.

=== 21 March ===
List of shipwrecks: 21 March 1929
Ship	State	Description
Øvre	Norway	The cargo ship came ashore on the Santa Fe coast, Brazil. She was refloated on 25 March.

=== 22 March ===
List of shipwrecks: 22 March 1929
Ship	State	Description
I'm Alone	Canada	Prohibition in the United States: The auxiliary schooner was intercepted in the Gulf of Mexico off the coast of Louisiana by USCGC Walcott (United States Coast Guard), which suspected her of rum-running. She disobeyed orders to stop and was shelled and sunk by USCGC Dexter (United States Coast Guard) with the loss of a crew member.

=== 24 March ===
List of shipwrecks: 24 March 1929
Ship	State	Description
Olivine	United Kingdom	The cargo ship ran aground at Prawle Point, Devon. She was refloated on 12 June and beached at Horsley Sand, then refloated again on 13 July.

=== 25 March ===
List of shipwrecks: 25 March 1929
Ship	State	Description
Germaine L D	France	The cargo ship collided with Alice Marie (United Kingdom) in the North Sea off Vlissingen, Netherlands and was beached at Rammekens. She was refloated the next day.
Maria Kyriakides	Greece	The cargo ship ran aground on Lundy Island, Devon, United Kingdom. Her eighteen crew were rescued. Maria Kyriakides was refloated eighteen months later.
Muggia	Regia Marina	The Fasana-class destroyer ran aground on the Finger Rocks near Hea Chu Island near Amoy, in dense fog and darkness, or during a typhoon, and was wrecked. 77 crew abandoned ship and went to some rocks. They were rescued by Matsumoto Maru (Japan) after the fog lifted on 26 March.
Weirbank	United Kingdom	The cargo ship ran aground at Warnemünde, Mecklenburg-Vorpommern, Germany. She was refloated on 15 April.

=== 26 March ===
List of shipwrecks: 26 March 1929
Ship	State	Description
Europa	Germany	Europa The ocean liner was severely damaged by fire during fitting-out at Hamburg. She was subsequently repaired and entered service in February 1930.

=== 27 March ===
List of shipwrecks: 27 March 1929
Ship	State	Description
Venetia	Germany	The cargo ship collided with Batavier I (Netherlands) in the North Sea off the Dutch coast and sank. Her crew were rescued by Batavier I.

=== 28 March ===
List of shipwrecks: 28 March 1929
Ship	State	Description
Kangtai	China	The coaster collided with Libia (Regia Marina) off Woosung and sank with the loss of 30 crew.
P. N. Damm	Denmark	The cargo ship collided with Elima (France) in the Bay of Biscay (approximately 46°N 7°W) and sank. Her crew were rescued by Elima.

=== 29 March ===
List of shipwrecks: 29 March 1929
Ship	State	Description
Cambrian Empress	United Kingdom	The cargo ship ran aground in the Paraná River, Argentina. She was refloated on 17 April.
Selje	Norway	The cargo ship collided with Kaituna (United Kingdom) in the Pacific Ocean 120 nautical miles (220 km) west of Port Phillip, Victoria, Australia and sank. Her crew were rescued by Kaituna.

=== 30 March ===
List of shipwrecks: 30 March 1929
Ship	State	Description
Moyalla	United Kingdom	The coaster ran aground at Enniscrone, County Sligo, Ireland. She was refloated on 6 April.

=== 31 March ===
List of shipwrecks: 31 March 1929
Ship	State	Description
Tung-Ting	United Kingdom	The cargo ship struck rocks in the Yangtze 80 nautical miles (150 km) downstream of Hangkow, China and sank.

=== Unknown date ===
List of shipwrecks: Unknown date March 1929
Ship	State	Description
Alice B	United States	The halibut schooner was wrecked in "West Bay" — presumably a reference to West Bay Cove (60°54′N 146°47′W) — on the south-central coast of the Territory of Alaska.

== April ==
=== 5 April ===
List of shipwrecks: 5 April 1929
Ship	State	Description
Discoverer	United States	The motor vessel was stranded on the south-central coast of the Territory of Alaska 12 nautical miles (22 km; 14 mi) southwest of Gore Point (59°12′00″N 150°57′30″W).

=== 6 April ===
List of shipwrecks: 6 April 1929
Ship	State	Description
A. Ernest Mills	United States	The four-masted schooner collided with USS Childs (United States Navy) in the Atlantic Ocean off North Carolina and sank.
Ioannis	Greece	The cargo ship was abandoned in the Mediterranean Sea (41°15′N 3°50′E).

=== 7 April ===
List of shipwrecks: 7 April 1929
Ship	State	Description
St Patrick	United Kingdom	The passenger ship caught fire at Fishguard, Pembrokeshire and was declared a constructive total loss and was scrapped in 1930.
Paris	France	The ocean liner ran aground in New York Harbor, United States. She was refloated 36 hours later.

=== 8 April ===
List of shipwrecks: 8 April 1929
Ship	State	Description
Western Knight	United States	The cargo ship ran aground at Chelsea Point, South Africa. She was declared a constructive total loss on 12 April. She broke in two on 1 June.

=== 11 April ===
List of shipwrecks: 11 April 1929
Ship	State	Description
Wilhelmina	Sweden	The cargo ship ran aground on Gisseloresand and was wrecked.

=== 12 April ===
List of shipwrecks: 12 April 1929
Ship	State	Description
Southern Sky	United Kingdom	The whaler foundered off South Georgia with the loss of all hands.
Wahratea	United Kingdom	The cargo ship sank at Launceston, Tasmania, Australia.

=== 13 April ===
List of shipwrecks: 13 April 1929
Ship	State	Description
Pfeil	Germany	The schooner collided with Jarl (Sweden) off the Kiel Lightship (Germany) and sank.
Sylvana	France	The cargo ship caught fire in the Atlantic Ocean (42°37′N 48°34′W) and was abandoned.

=== 14 April ===
List of shipwrecks: 14 April 1929
Ship	State	Description
Norvic	United Kingdom	The cargo ship foundered in the North Sea ran aground on the Haisborough Sands, Norfolk and sank.
Robrix	United Kingdom	The coaster collided with Andelle (United Kingdom) in the North Sea off Great Yarmouth, Norfolk and sank with the loss of one of her eight crew. Survivors were rescued by Andelle.

=== 17 April ===
List of shipwrecks: 17 April 1929
Ship	State	Description
Belridge	Norway	The cargo ship ran aground on the Alligator Reef, in the Caribbean Sea 51 nautical miles (94 km) west south west of Kingston, Jamaica. She was refloated on 23 April.
James E. Coburn	United States	The schooner sank in the Atlantic Ocean 25 nautical miles (46 km) north of Bermuda. Eight crew were rescued by the yacht Amida (United States) off the coast of Florida (24°25′N 64°35′W) on 25 April, a ninth crew member had died the previous day.

=== 18 April ===
List of shipwrecks: 18 April 1929
Ship	State	Description
Paris	France	The ocean liner ran aground on the Eddystone Rocks, Cornwall, United Kingdom. She was refloated two hours later. She was anchored off Penlee, Cornwall where 157 of her passengers were taken off by a tender and landed at Plymouth, Devon.
Suez 3	Netherlands	The dredger came ashore at Cádiz, Spain and sank.

=== 20 April ===
List of shipwrecks: 20 April 1929
Ship	State	Description
Nellie and Mary	United Kingdom	The schooner came ashore at Channel, Newfoundland and was a total loss.
Johanne	Germany	The auxiliary sailing vessel collided with Westpool (United States) at Hamburg and sank with the loss of a crew member.

=== 22 April ===
List of shipwrecks: 22 April 1929
Ship	State	Description
Shamrock	United States	The 13-gross register ton, 38.5-foot (11.7 m) motor vessel was wrecked in rough weather on the south-central coast of the Territory of Alaska about 2 nautical miles (3.7 km; 2.3 mi) south of Ninilchik.
Toyokuni Maru	Japan	The cargo liner struck rocks and sank off Cape Erimo, Hokkaidō with heavy loss of life.

=== 25 April ===
List of shipwrecks: 25 April 1929
Ship	State	Description
Thalatta	Norway	The cargo ship caught fire in the North Sea and was beached at Egersund, Norway.

=== 27 April ===
List of shipwrecks: 27 April 1929
Ship	State	Description
Duchess of Richmond	United Kingdom	The ocean liner ran aground at Saint John, New Brunswick, Canada. Her passengers were taken off. She was refloated the next day.

=== 29 April ===
List of shipwrecks: 29 April 1929
Ship	State	Description
Bahia de Fondo	Argentina	The cargo ship ran aground on Tova Island. She refloated but subsequently foundered.
Kajsa	Sweden	The cargo ship collided with Douro (Denmark) off Dragør, Denmark and sank. Her crew were rescued by Douro.
Francis L. Taussig	United States	While at anchor in fog in Vineyard Sound off the coast of Massachusetts, 1 nautical mile (1.9 km; 1.2 mi) north of East Chop Light on Martha's Vineyard, with a cargo of coal on board, the 194-foot (59 m) four-masted schooner sank with no loss of life in 60 feet (18 m) of water at 42°29.14′N 070°33.88′W after another ship accidentally rammed her.
Senita	Norway	The cargo ship ran aground on the Alacran Reef, Mexico and was a total loss.
Viking	United Kingdom	The cargo ship caught fire and sank in the Philippine Sea (approximately 11°N 123°E) with the loss of seventeen crew.

=== Unknown date ===
List of shipwrecks: Unknown date April 1929
Ship	State	Description
Franconia	United Kingdom	The ocean liner collided in Shanghai harbour with an Italian gunboat and a Japanese cargo steamer.

== May ==
=== 2 May ===
List of shipwrecks: 2 May 1929
Ship	State	Description
River Orontes	United Kingdom	The cargo ship collided with Cristóbal Colón (Spain) at New York, United States and was beached. Her crew were rescued by the fireboat Zophar Mills (United States) and a tug. She was refloated on 10 May.

=== 3 May ===
List of shipwrecks: 3 May 1929
Ship	State	Description
Hedgehope	United Kingdom	The cargo ship collided with Lalande (United Kingdom) at Montevideo, Uruguay and was beached near the Recalada a Bahía Blanca Lighthouse, Argentina.
O. E. Parks	United States	During a voyage from Sault Ste. Marie, Michigan, to Alpena, Michigan, with a cargo of pulpwood, the wooden steam barge began taking on water in a snowstorm with heavy seas and sank in 62 feet (19 m) of water in Lake Huron off the coast of Michigan at 45.0519°N 83.17545°W.

=== 4 May ===
List of shipwrecks: 4 May 1929
Ship	State	Description
Margaret Olsen	United States	The tug sank off Hamilton Avenue, Brooklyn, New York, five minutes after colliding with the ferry Joseph A. Guider (United States). All six people on board Margaret Olsen survived.

=== 5 May ===
List of shipwrecks: 5 May 1929
Ship	State	Description
Roald Amundson	United States	The 30-gross register ton, 49.5-foot (15.1 m) fishing vessel was destroyed by a fire that broke out in her engine room and sank in Principe Canal on the coast of British Columbia, Canada. Her crew abandoned ship in a lifeboat and poled it by hand for 40 nautical miles (74 km; 46 mi) before the lighthouse tender Newington (Canada) rescued them.
Winnipeg	United Kingdom	The Thames barge sank off Southend Pier, Essex.

=== 10 May ===
List of shipwrecks: 10 May 1929
Ship	State	Description
September	United Kingdom	The Thames barge was struck by Prahsu (United Kingdom) and sank in the River Thames at West Thurrock, Essex.

=== 12 May ===
List of shipwrecks: 12 May 1929
Ship	State	Description
Boobyalla	United States	The cargo ship caught fire at Victoria, British Columbia, Canada and was a total loss.

=== 15 May ===
List of shipwrecks: 15 May 1929
Ship	State	Description
Ralph Budd	United States	The cargo ship ran aground at Eagle River, Michigan and was abandoned.

=== 26 May ===
List of shipwrecks: 26 May 1929
Ship	State	Description
Aleutian	United States	The 5,708-gross register ton passenger steamer sank with the loss of one crewman seven minutes after striking a pinnacle rock off the south end of Amook Island (57°25′30″N 153°50′30″W) in Uyak Bay (57.8000°N 154.0667°W) on the coast of Kodiak Island in the Territory of Alaska. Everyone else on board – 39 passengers and 114 crewmen – was rescued by a small motorboat and a cannery tender.

=== 27 May ===
List of shipwrecks: 27 May 1929
Ship	State	Description
Marden	United Kingdom	The cargo ship collided with The Sultan (United Kingdom) in the North Sea off Cromer, Norfolk and sank. Her crew were rescued by The Sultan.

=== 28 May ===
List of shipwrecks: 28 May 1929
Ship	State	Description
Michalis Prios	Greece	The cargo ship ran aground 2 nautical miles (3.7 km) off Staithes, Yorkshire, United Kingdom. Her crew were rescued.
Sea Bird	United States	The 12-gross register ton, 35.5-foot (10.8 m) fishing vessel was destroyed in Cape Strait (56°59′55″N 133°05′30″W) in Southeast Alaska by a fire that started when her carburetor backfired. The only person on board abandoned ship and was rescued from the water by the motor vessel Betty (United States).
Wugo Maru	Japan	The passenger ship caught fire in the Pacific Ocean off Sakhalin, Soviet Union and sank with the loss of all on board.

== June ==
=== 3 June ===
List of shipwrecks: 3 June 1929
Ship	State	Description
Edgehill	United States	The cargo ship ran aground in the Neches River, Texas. She was refloated on 15 June.
Glencregagh	United Kingdom	The coaster ran aground on the west coast of Guernsey, Channel Islands. She broke in tow and sank. All eleven crew survived.
Swainby	United Kingdom	The cargo ship came ashore at Atwood Cay, Bahamas. She was refloated on 10 June.
Valvadere	United States	The 10-gross register ton 40-foot (12 m) gasoline-powered wooden fishing vessel burned near the Copper River in the Territory of Alaska. Her crew of two survived. She later was salvaged, repaired, and returned to service.

=== 4 June ===
List of shipwrecks: 4 June 1929
Ship	State	Description
Ella	Germany	The auxiliary motor fishing vessel was damaged in a collision with Beka (Netherlands) 22 miles (35 km) north northwest of the Norderney Lightship, later sinking.
Jane	United Kingdom	The schooner foundered in the Irish Sea 6 nautical miles (11 km) east of Annalong, County Down.
Scottish American	United Kingdom	The tanker caught fire in the Atlantic Ocean off Rio Grande and was severely damaged.

=== 7 June ===
List of shipwrecks: 7 June 1929
Ship	State	Description
Le Norvégien	Norway	The cargo ship ran aground east of Astove Island, Seychelles. Her crew were rescued.

=== 8 June ===
List of shipwrecks: 8 June 1929
Ship	State	Description
Atlantus	United States	The out of service concrete hulled cargo ship broke free of her moorings and ran aground 150 feet (46 m) off the coast of Sunset Beach, Cape May, New Jersey. She started breaking up in the 1950s.

=== 10 June ===
List of shipwrecks: 10 June 1929
Ship	State	Description
Baikal Maru	Japan	The passenger-cargo ship ran aground on a reef on Daiton Island in dense fog. The rescue ship Kaigen Maru (Japan) arrived on 13 June, removed passengers and refloated her.
Bolton Castle	United Kingdom	The cargo ship ran aground off the San Carlos Lighthouse, Philippines. She was refloated on 14 June.
Mary Sears	United States	The auxiliary schooner caught fire in the Atlantic Ocean and was abandoned (44°03′N 58°50′W).

=== 11 June ===
List of shipwrecks: 11 June 1929
Ship	State	Description
Albania	Greece	The cargo ship sprang a leak in the Sea of Marmara and was beached at Injeh Burnu, Turkey. She was refloated later that day.
Amalfi	Italy	The cargo ship ran aground in the Paraná River, Argentina.
Cutty Sark	United Kingdom	The schooner lost her rudder and was abandoned in the Atlantic Ocean (37°28′N 67°26′W). She was set afire by her crew, who were rescued by Nevisian (United Kingdom).
Munalbro	United States	The cargo ship ran aground on the Mucaras Reef, Bahamas. She was refloated some days later and arrived at Key West, Florida on 22 June.

=== 14 June ===
List of shipwrecks: 14 June 1929
Ship	State	Description
Blairesk	United Kingdom	The cargo ship ran aground in the Bay of Rocks and was beached on White Island, Northwest Territories, Canada. She was refloated on 9 July.
Dionyssios	Greece	The cargo ship ran aground on the Grundkallegrund, Baltic Sea. She was refloated on 17 June.

=== 16 June ===
List of shipwrecks: 16 June 1929
Ship	State	Description
Invicta	United Kingdom	The tug sank in the River Thames at North Woolwich, London. She was raised on 18 June.

=== 17 June ===
List of shipwrecks: 17 June 1929
Ship	State	Description
Laurel	United States	The cargo ship ran aground in the Columbia River and broke in two with the loss of a crew member.

=== 21 June ===
List of shipwrecks: 21 June 1929
Ship	State	Description
Jonarnes	Norway	The cargo ship ran aground at Storbaaen Stadt and sank. Her crew were rescued.

=== 24 June ===
List of shipwrecks: 24 June 1929
Ship	State	Description
Kopoola	United Kingdom	The cargo ship ran aground at American River, South Australia. She was refloated on 27 June.

=== 25 June ===
List of shipwrecks: 25 June 1929
Ship	State	Description
Ida II	Norway	The coaster sprang a leak in the Kattegat off Lyngør, Norway and sank with the loss of a crew member.
Passat	Germany	The barque collided with the British Governor (United Kingdom) in the North Sea off the Royal Sovereign Lightship (United Kingdom) and was severely damaged. She was towed into Rotterdam, Netherlands by British Governor.

=== 27 June ===
List of shipwrecks: 27 June 1929
Ship	State	Description
Istar	United Kingdom	The cargo ship came ashore on the west coast of Madagascar.
Marden	United Kingdom	The cargo ship sank after colliding with The Sultan (United Kingdom) off Cromer Knoll.

== July ==
=== 1 July ===
List of shipwrecks: 1 July 1929
Ship	State	Description
Ixia	United Kingdom	The cargo ship came ashore at Cape Cornwall. Her crew were rescued, but she broke in two on 5 July and was a total loss.

=== 2 July ===
List of shipwrecks: 2 July 1929
Ship	State	Description
Ann Hanify	United States	The cargo ship came ashore at Point Conception, California. She was refloated on 11 July.

=== 5 July ===
List of shipwrecks: 5 July 1929
Ship	State	Description
Yomei Maru	Japan	The cargo ship ran aground at Kamaishi. She was declared a total loss on 6 August.

=== 7 July ===
List of shipwrecks: 7 July 1929
Ship	State	Description
Evgenia	Greece	The cargo ship ran aground on Le Lion de mer, Var, France. Her crew abandoned ship. She was declared a total loss on 17 July.
Romaine	United Kingdom	The schooner foundered at North West River, Labrador. Her crew survived.

=== 8 July ===
List of shipwrecks: 8 July 1929
Ship	State	Description
Botte	Sweden	The cargo ship ran aground in the North Sea off Great Yarmouth, Norfolk, United Kingdom and sank. All eighteen crew were rescued by Anneberg (Netherlands).
Cambrian Idylle	United Kingdom	The cargo ship ran aground in the Paraná River, Argentina. She was refloated on 11 July.
Resource	United States	The salvage vessel sank in the Suur Sound. All crew were rescued.
Scheldejol	Belgium	The cargo ship foundered in the harbour at Zeebrugge after her cargo shifted.
Solent	United Kingdom	The Thames barge sank at Zeebrugge, West Flanders, Belgium.
Tenkai Maru	Japan	The cargo ship collided with Aso Maru (Japan) at Shimonoseki and was beached. She was refloated on 11 July.

=== 9 July ===
List of shipwrecks: 9 July 1929
Ship	State	Description
HMS H47	Royal Navy	The H-class submarine collided with HMS L12 (Royal Navy) in the Bristol Channel off Milford Haven, Pembrokeshire and sank with the loss of 21 of her 24 crew.
Tay	United Kingdom	The auxiliary sailing ship was wrecked at Sunderland, Co. Durham.

=== 10 July ===
List of shipwrecks: 10 July 1929
Ship	State	Description
Hayamoto Maru	Japan	The passenger ship came ashore at Tokuyama. All on board were rescued. She was refloated on 20 July.
King Cadwallon	United Kingdom	The collier caught fire in the Indian Ocean off Durban, South Africa (32°01′S 40°41′E). She was abandoned on 12 July, with her crew being rescued by Ardenhall (United Kingdom). On 31 July, she was reported by Ripley Castle (United Kingdom) to be still afloat and was again reported on 14 August as being 50 nautical miles (93 km) north of Durban. The minesweepers HMSAS Immortelle and HMSAS Sonnebloem (both South African Navy) were despatched to locate her. She was anchored of East London on 20 August. She was driven ashore on 12 September and was a total loss.
Junyo Maru	Japan	The cargo ship collided with Taisei Maru (Japan) at Isizu and was beached. She was refloated on 14 July.

=== 11 July ===
List of shipwrecks: 11 July 1929
Ship	State	Description
Margarethe	Germany	The auxiliary sailing ship collided with Smut (Finland) in the North Sea off Cuxhaven, Germany and sank with the loss of two crew.

=== 12 July ===
List of shipwrecks: 12 July 1929
Ship	State	Description
Marslew	United Kingdom	The cargo ship ran aground in the Paraná River, Argentina. She was refloated on 15 July.
Seaforth	United Kingdom	The cargo ship collided with Cristina (Spain) in the Bristol Channel (50°42′N 5°07′W) and sank. Her crew were rescued by Cristina.
Tamatsu Maru	Japan	The cargo ship ran aground at Cape Soni, Sakhalin, Soviet Union. She was refloated on 17 July.

=== 13 July ===
List of shipwrecks: 13 July 1929
Ship	State	Description
Rose Marie	United States	The 22-gross register ton, 41.7-foot (12.7 m) fishing vessel burned and sank off the Porcupine Islands (57°48′N 136°23′W) in Southeast Alaska. Her crew of two was rescued by the troller T860 and the vessel Virginia III (both United States).

=== 15 July ===
List of shipwrecks: 15 July 1929
Ship	State	Description
Afon Dulais	United Kingdom	The cargo ship ran aground at Llanelli, Carmarthenshire. She was refloated on 19 July.

=== 16 July ===
List of shipwrecks: 16 July 1929
Ship	State	Description
Abtao	Chilean Navy	The transport ship foundered in the Pacific Ocean off San Antonio with the loss of 42 of her 43 crew.
Annie E. Conrad	United Kingdom	The schooner can aground at Ireland's Eye, Newfoundland and was a total loss.

=== 17 July ===
List of shipwrecks: 17 July 1929
Ship	State	Description
Derfflinger	Germany	The cargo liner ran aground at Siau Kung Tau, China. Her passengers were taken off by USS Paul Jones and some of the crew were taken off by USS Black Hawk (both United States Navy). She was refloated on 20 July and beached off Qingdao. She had to be beached again on 22 August but was refloated later that day.
USS General Alava	United States Navy	The General Alava-class cargo ship was sunk as a target off the coast of China.

=== 19 July ===
List of shipwrecks: 19 July 1929
Ship	State	Description
Nubian	United Kingdom	The cargo ship ran aground on Anticosti Island, Quebec, Canada. She was refloated on 24 July.
Sumatra	Italy	The cargo ship ran aground on Mascali Island, Djibouti, French Somaliland. She was refloated on 23 July.

=== 21 July ===
List of shipwrecks: 21 July 1929
Ship	State	Description
Frauenfels	Germany	The cargo ship ran aground at Djibouti, French Somaliland whilst assisting in the refloating of Sumatra (Italy). She was refloated on 23 July.
Hsin Kong	Japan	The ship collided with Tatsuno Maru (Japan) 3 nautical miles (5.6 km) off the Shantung Promontory and sank with the loss of 60 lives.

=== 22 July ===
List of shipwrecks: 22 July 1929
Ship	State	Description
Avarua	United Kingdom	The schooner was destroyed by fire and sank at Raiatea, French Polynesia.
Kong Helge	Norway	The passenger ship was sunk off the Tvistein Lighthouse, Norway. All on board survived.
Penmarch	France	The coaster collided with Palermo (Germany) in the English Channel and sank. Her crew were rescued by Palermo.
Pep	United States	The 10-gross register ton 31.7-foot (9.7 m) fishing vessel sank in Sheep Bay (60°38′N 146°04′W) on the south-central coast of the Territory of Alaska. Her crew of three survived.

=== 23 July ===
List of shipwrecks: 23 July 1929
Ship	State	Description
Artemis	Greece	The cargo ship ran aground on Martín García Island, Uruguay. She was refloated on 29 July.

=== 24 July ===
List of shipwrecks: 24 July 1929
Ship	State	Description
Levenbridge	United Kingdom	The cargo ship ran aground on the Mucarus Reef off the coast of Florida, United States. She was refloated on 30 July.
Vale of Pickering	United Kingdom	The cargo ship collided with Rotha (United Kingdom) in the English Channel 30 nautical miles (56 km) off Point d'Ailly, Dieppe, Seine-Inférieure, France and capsized and sank.

=== 26 July ===
List of shipwrecks: 26 July 1929
Ship	State	Description
Golden Forest	United States	The cargo ship ran aground on one of the Aleutian Islands, Alaska and was beached in Lost Bay. She was refloated on 4 September. but went aground again on 7 September in the Shelik Strait. She was abandoned as a total loss on 13 September.
Hermes	Greece	The cargo ship ran aground at Aden. She broke her back and was a total loss.
Unuk	United States	With a crew of four aboard, the 12-gross register ton, 35.8-foot (10.9 m) fishing vessel collided with the vessel Confidence (United States) about 1 nautical mile (1.9 km; 1.2 mi) north of Channel Island Light near Ketchikan, Territory of Alaska. There was no loss of life. Confidence towed the wrecked Unuk into Wards Cove, where she was declared a total loss.

=== 29 July ===
List of shipwrecks: 29 July 1929
Ship	State	Description
Wabana	United Kingdom	The cargo ship collided with C. H. Houson (United Kingdom) off the Moria Shoal, Quebec, Canada and was beached. She was refloated on 31 July.

=== 30 July ===
List of shipwrecks: 30 July 1929
Ship	State	Description
Tautil	Chile	The tug was wrecked in the Chiloe Channel.

=== 31 July ===
List of shipwrecks: 31 July 1929
Ship	State	Description
Elizabeth Worthington	United Kingdom	The schooner sprang a leak in the Bristol Channel and was beached at Margam, Glamorgan, Wales.
Neponset	United States	The tug lost her propeller in the Pacific Ocean 1,500 nautical miles (2,800 km) south of San Pedro, California. She was abandoned and sank.
Norman A	United States	The 10-net register ton motor vessel ran aground, burned, and sank on the northeast coast of Kelp Island (54°52′N 131°16′W) in Southeast Alaska. Her entire crew of three survived.

== August ==
=== 1 August ===
List of shipwrecks: 1 August 1929
Ship	State	Description
Asakaze	Imperial Japanese Navy	The decommissioned minesweeper, a former destroyer, was sunk as a gunnery target by the battlecruisers Haruna and Hiei (both Imperial Japanese Navy).

=== 3 August ===
List of shipwrecks: 3 August 1929
Ship	State	Description
Aurora	Sweden	The cargo ship foundered in the Baltic Sea (approximately 59°N 19°E).
Hartford	United States	The ship suffered a breakage of her steering gear and ran aground in the Connecticut River. Her passengers were taken off and she was later refloated after discharging her cargo.
Medway Queen	United Kingdom	The paddle steamer collided with Southend Pier, Essex and was extensively damaged at the bows.

=== 4 August ===
List of shipwrecks: 4 August 1929
Ship	State	Description
Adonis	Netherlands	The cargo ship capsized and sank in the Mediterranean Sea 8 nautical miles (15 km) off Cape Ferrat, Alpes-Maritimes, France. All crew survived.

=== 5 August ===
List of shipwrecks: 5 August 1929
Ship	State	Description
Stephen R. Jones	United States	The cargo ship ran aground off Providence, Rhode Island. She was refloated on 10 August.

=== 6 August ===
List of shipwrecks: 6 August 1929
Ship	State	Description
Maindy Manor	United Kingdom	The cargo ship ran aground in the Paraná River at Paso, Paraguayo, Argentina. She was refloated on 12 August.

=== 8 August ===
List of shipwrecks: 8 August 1929
Ship	State	Description
Mina Brae	United Kingdom	The tanker caught fire off Canso, Nova Scotia, Canada and was abandoned.

=== 9 August ===
List of shipwrecks: 9 August 1929
Ship	State	Description
Eastgate	United Kingdom	The cargo ship ran aground in the Paraná River at Paso, Paraguayo, Argentina. She was refloated on 12 August but then ran aground again.
Olanda	Italy	The tug was in collision with Viceroy of India (United Kingdom) at Venice and was beached.

=== 11 August ===
List of shipwrecks: 11 August 1929
Ship	State	Description
San Luis	Honduras	The four-masted schooner caught fire in the Atlantic Ocean off Uruguay (34°00′S 52°27′W) and was abandoned.

=== 14 August ===
List of shipwrecks: 14 August 1929
Ship	State	Description
Portugal	Portugal	The auxiliary schooner was destroyed by fire at Beira, Portuguese East Africa.

=== 16 August ===
List of shipwrecks: 16 August 1929
Ship	State	Description
Theodora	United Kingdom	The cargo ship sank off the Minquiers Rocks, Jersey, Channel Islands. Her crew were rescued.

=== 17 August ===
List of shipwrecks: 17 August 1929
Ship	State	Description
Roar	Norway	The cargo ship ran aground on Valsörarna, Finland. She was refloated on 20 August but foundered later that day. She was refloated again on 1 September.

=== 18 August ===
List of shipwrecks: 18 August 1929
Ship	State	Description
Ogono	Spain	The cargo ship collided with King's Cross (United Kingdom) in the North Sea off the Dowsing Lightship (United Kingdom) and sank with the loss of fifteen of her 25 crew. Survivors were rescued by King's Cross.
Zuiyo Maru	Japan	The cargo ship ran aground on Okojiri Island. She was refloated on 10 September.

=== 19 August ===
List of shipwrecks: 19 August 1929
Ship	State	Description
Deutschland	Germany	The cargo ship collided with Alexandra (Germany) at Stettin, West Pomerania and sank.
Luchana	United Kingdom	The cargo ship ran aground at Oneglia, Liguria, Italy. She was refloated on 24 August.
Quimistan	Germany	The cargo ship caught fire and was abandoned in the Atlantic Ocean 1,100 miles (1,800 km) east of Norfolk, Virginia. The crew were rescued by Wolverine State (United States) on 21 August. Apparently scuttled by the United States Coast Guard later as a hazard to navigation.

=== 20 August ===
List of shipwrecks: 20 August 1929
Ship	State	Description
Paris	France	The ocean liner was severely damaged by fire at Le Havre, Seine-Inférieure. She was refloated on 11 September.

=== 22 August ===
List of shipwrecks: 22 August 1929
Ship	State	Description
Cereal	United Kingdom	The Thames barge ran aground, capsized and sank at Whitstable, Kent. She was refloated on 25 August.
James Holly	United Kingdom	The tug capsized and sank at Yarmouth, Nova Scotia, Canada.
Tresness	United Kingdom	The auxiliary sailing vessel sank in the River Barrow at New Ross, County Wexford, Ireland.

=== 25 August ===
List of shipwrecks: 25 August 1929
Ship	State	Description
Koyasan Maru	Japan	The cargo ship collided with Glenapp (United Kingdom) at Shimonoseki and was beached.

=== 26 August ===
List of shipwrecks: 26 August 1929
Ship	State	Description
Corona	United States	The 36-gross register ton motor schooner was destroyed by a fire and a series of explosions while fishing for halibut 15 nautical miles (28 km; 17 mi) west-southwest of Noyes Island in the Alexander Archipelago in Southeast Alaska. Her crew of 11 survived and was rescued by the motor vessel Tordenskold (United States).
Hauxley	United Kingdom	The cargo ship collided with the steamer Morta (United Kingdom) off the mouth of the Tyne in England and was beached.

=== 27 August ===
List of shipwrecks: 27 August 1929
Ship	State	Description
Aurora	United States	The 10-gross register ton fishing vessel was destroyed in Southeast Alaska near Sanitarium (now Goddard 56°50′05″N 135°22′20″W), 16 nautical miles (30 km; 18 mi) from Sitka, by a fire that began when her gasoline engine backfired. Her crew survived.
Bizkargi Mendi	Spain	The cargo ship ran aground on Brisant Rock, off Salvara Island. She was refloated on 2 September.
Centenary	United Kingdom	The schooner came ashore at Codroy Harbour, Newfoundland and was a total loss.
Heinrich	Germany	The cargo ship ran aground at Lessoe, Denmark. Her crew were rescued.

=== 29 August ===
List of shipwrecks: 29 August 1929
Ship	State	Description
San Juan	United States	The passenger ship collided with S. C. T. Dodd (United States) in the Pacific Ocean 15 miles (24 km) south east of Pigeon Point, California in dense fog and sank with the loss of 20 crew, including her captain, and 55 passengers of the 100 people on board.

=== 31 August ===
List of shipwrecks: 31 August 1929
Ship	State	Description
Eagle	United Kingdom	The tug collided with Alice (United Kingdom) at Cardiff, Glamorgan and sank. She was refloated on 3 September.

=== Unknown date ===
List of shipwrecks: Unknown date 1929
Ship	State	Description
Elisif	Norway	The auxiliary schooner was lost in ice off the coast of Siberia while on an Arctic trading voyage. Her captain and crew of 20 reached Little Diomede Island in the Bering Strait in two launches, and the cutter USCGC Northland ( United States Coast Guard) picked them up there.

== September ==
=== 1 September ===
List of shipwrecks: 1 September 1929
Ship	State	Description
Ole Aarvold	Norway	The cargo ship was driven ashore at Cape Pine, Newfoundland and was a total loss. Her crew were rescued.

=== 2 September ===
List of shipwrecks: 2 September 1929
Ship	State	Description
Carridi	Italy	The cargo ship ran aground in the Paraná River, Argentina. She was refloated on 5 September.
Clytie	United Kingdom	The sloop collided with Weltondale (United Kingdom) in the River Ouse at Blacktoft, Yorkshire and sank with the loss of both crew.
Dorothy	United States	The cargo ship collided with Eurana (United States) in Chesapeake Bay and sank with the loss of a crew member.

=== 3 September ===
List of shipwrecks: 3 September 1929
Ship	State	Description
Dominion Coaster	United Kingdom	The auxiliary sailing ship ran aground on Gammons Rocks, off White Head Island, New Brunswick, Canada and was a total loss.
Fighting Cock	United Kingdom	The tug collided with the dredged G. B. Crow in the River Mersey at Liverpool, Lancashire and sank.
Førdefjord	Norway	The cargo ship ran aground at La Plata, Argentina. She was refloated on 9 September.
H I C #4	United States	While under tow from Yakutat to the Dangerous River (59°20′55″N 139°18′00″W) in the Territory of Alaska with no crew or cargo aboard, the 27-ton scow's towline parted during a gale, and she drifted onto the Dangerous River Bar, where the surf pounded her to pieces.

=== 4 September ===
List of shipwrecks: 4 September 1929
Ship	State	Description
Bluff	United States	The 25-ton scow was broken up by surf during a gale while moored on the beach at Egavik (64°02′N 160°55′W) on the west-central coast of the Territory of Alaska. Her lone crewman survived.
Kardamila	Greece	The cargo ship ran aground in the Paraná River, Argentina. She was refloated on 24 September.
Mary Mildred	United Kingdom	The schooner was destroyed by fire at St. Mary's Bay, Newfoundland.

=== 5 September ===
List of shipwrecks: 5 September 1929
Ship	State	Description
Golden Forest	United States	Badly damaged on 24 July when she struck a rock off Avatak Island when she diverted during a voyage from San Francisco, California, to Yokohama, Japan, to transfer a sick crew member to the cutter USCGC Haida ( United States Coast Guard) in Unimak Pass in the Aleutian Islands, the 5,658-gross register ton steamer, with a crew of 34 and a 6,413 tons of cargo aboard, was wrecked in fog at Cape Ilktugitak (58°01′15″N 154°34′45″W) in the Shelikof Strait on the south coast of the Alaska Peninsula in the Territory of Alaska while steaming from Akutan in the Aleutians to Victoria, British Columbia, Canada, for repairs. The steamer Salvage King (United Kingdom), which had been escorting Golden Forest, and an unidentified motor vessel rescued her crew.
Johannes	Germany	The auxiliary schooner collided with Carl (Denmark) in the Kaiser Wilhelm Canal and sank.
Nordnes	Norway	The cargo ship ran at Florø, Norway. She was refloated on 11 September.
Zuiho Maru	Japan	The cargo ship came ashore on Sesokojima.

=== 7 September ===
List of shipwrecks: 7 September 1929
Ship	State	Description
Dan	Denmark	The cargo ship foundered in the Baltic Sea with the loss of all but one of her crew.
Kuru	Finland	The passenger ship capsized and sank in Näsijärvi lake, near Tampere with the loss of 136 of the 162 people on board. She was later raised, repaired and returned to service.
Libby, McNeill & Libby No. 1	United States	While under tow by the tug North Star (United States) with no people or cargo on board, the 11-ton scow sank in bad weather in Dixon Entrance in Southeast Alaska.
Santa Quiteria	United Kingdom	The schooner was abandoned in the Atlantic Ocean off Cape Race, Newfoundland (44°23′N 50°09′W). Her crew were rescued by Gil Eannes (Portuguese Navy).

=== 8 September ===
List of shipwrecks: 8 September 1929
Ship	State	Description
Elanchove	Spain	The cargo ship ran aground in the Mediterranean Sea on the Quoyrios Bank. She was refloated on 11 September.
Heimdall	Sweden	The passenger ship ran aground on Vaxholm. All 70 people on board survived.
N. P. Petersen	Denmark	The sailing ship ran aground in the River Parret at Bridgwater, Somerset, United Kingdom. She was refloated on 17 September.

=== 9 September ===
List of shipwrecks: 9 September 1929
Ship	State	Description
Andaste	United States	The cargo ship sank in Lake Michigan between Grand Haven, Michigan and Chicago. Lost with all 25 crew.
Highland Pride	United Kingdom	The cargo liner ran aground on the Carillones Rocks, Bayona, Pontevedra, Spain. All on board were rescued. She broke in two and sank on 10 September.
Rassay	United Kingdom	The cargo ship collided with Olivebank (United Kingdom) in the Paraná River, Argentina and was beached. She was refloated on 19 September.
The Emperor	United Kingdom	The cargo ship ran aground at Shoreham-by-Sea, Sussex. She was refloated on 15 September.
Zmaj	Reichsmarine	The tanker caught fire in the North Sea 7 nautical miles (13 km) off the Sandettie Lightship (United Kingdom) and was abandoned by her crew. She was towed into Vlissingen, Netherlands by Hermes (Netherlands).

=== 10 September ===
List of shipwrecks: 10 September 1929
Ship	State	Description
Kurt Georg	Germany	The auxiliary sailing vessel sprang a leak and sank at Rostock, Mecklenburg-Vorpommern. Her crew survived.
Pacific Spruce	United States	The cargo ship ran aground in the Morant Cays, Jamaica. She was refloated on 21 September.

=== 11 September ===
List of shipwrecks: 11 September 1929
Ship	State	Description
Acielle	Australia	The ketch was driven ashore and wrecked 15 nautical miles (28 km) south of the Smoky Cap Lighthouse, New South Wales.
Estella	Belgium	The cargo ship collided with Indra (Germany) in the Scheldt and sank with the loss of fourteen of her sixteen crew. Survivors were rescued by Kruisschans (Belgium).
Fuki Maru	Japan	The cargo ship was driven ashore on the Saratoga Spit during a typhoon. She was refloated on 16 September.

=== 12 September ===
For the loss of the British collier King Cadwallon on this day, see the entry for 10 July 1929.

List of shipwrecks: 12 September 1929
Ship	State	Description
Baucis	France	The cargo ship ran aground at Point Amour, Labrador, Canada. Salvage efforts were abandoned on 19 September.
Estonaval	Estonia	The sailing vessel capsized in Kunda Bay and drifted ashore with the loss of all hands.
Francesco P	Italy	The cargo ship was driven ashore at Sète, Hérault, France. She broke up and was a total loss. Her crew survived.

=== 14 September ===
For the loss of the American cargo ship Golden Forest on this day, see the entry for 26 July 1929.

=== 17 September ===
List of shipwrecks: 17 September 1929
Ship	State	Description
Urayaru Maru	Japan	The cargo ship ran aground at Mokpo, Korea. She was refloated on 24 September.

=== 20 September ===
List of shipwrecks: 20 September 1929
Ship	State	Description
Adamitos J. Pithis	Greece	The cargo ship ran aground at Pahalueto, Sweden. She was refloated on 26 September.
Disciplina	Spain	The cargo ship ran aground off Hook of Holland, Netherlands. She was refloated on 28 September.
Erpel	Germany	The cargo ship ran aground off Viborg, Denmark. She was refloated but was consequently beached.
Defender	Norway	The cargo ship sank in the Norwegian Sea of the east coast of Iceland. Her crew were rescued.

=== 21 September ===
List of shipwrecks: 21 September 1929
Ship	State	Description
Glitne	Norway	The auxiliary schooner sprang a leak in the North Sea (56°48′N 6°46′E) and was abandoned. Her crew were rescued by the trawler Gebruder Bracke (Germany).
Höchst	Germany	The cargo ship ran aground on Minicoy, Maldive Islands. She was destroyed by an explosion and fire on 13 October. All 28 crew were rescued by Mathura (United Kingdom).
Yesaki Maru	Japan	The cargo ship came ashore on the west coast of Sakhalin, Soviet Union. She was refloated on 27 September.

=== 23 September ===
List of shipwrecks: 23 September 1929
Ship	State	Description
Carl Gerhard	Sweden	The cargo ship came ashore at Norfolk, Virginia, United States. She broke in two and was a total loss.

=== 24 September ===
List of shipwrecks: 24 September 1929
Ship	State	Description
Westerdale	United Kingdom	The coaster foundered in the North Sea (56°32′N 7°03′E). All fourteen crew were rescued, eleven of them by Stargard (Norway) and three by another vessel.

=== 25 September ===
List of shipwrecks: 25 September 1929
Ship	State	Description
Domira	United Kingdom	1929 Bahamas hurricane: The cargo ship was driven ashore at Abaco Island, Bahamas. She was declared a total loss on 2 October.
Nyland	Norway	The coaster was in collision with Santiago (Norway) off Haugesund, Norway and sank with the loss of all but her captain.

=== 26 September ===
List of shipwrecks: 26 September 1929
Ship	State	Description
Autorenault	France	The cargo ship collided with P.L.M. 17 in the River Seine at Rouen, Seine Maritime and sank.

=== 27 September ===
List of shipwrecks: 27 September 1929
Ship	State	Description
Gronant Rose	United Kingdom	The collier foundered in the Bay of Biscay south of Ouessant, Finistère, France. Her crew survived.

=== 28 September ===
List of shipwrecks: 28 September 1929
Ship	State	Description
Albia	Spain	The cargo ship ran aground on the Allen Rock, off the coast of Wigtownshire, United Kingdom and was abandoned by her crew. She was a total loss.
Domira	United Kingdom	1929 Bahamas hurricane: The cargo ship sank at Nassau, Bahamas during a hurricane.
Firebird	(United Kingdom) The Bahamas	1929 Bahamas hurricane: The cargo ship foundered at Nassau during a hurricane.
Linnet	United States	The fishing vessel was lost in Chatham Strait in the Alexander Archipelago in Southeast Alaska.
Potomac	United Kingdom	1929 Bahamas hurricane: The tanker was driven ashore on Andros, Bahamas. She broke in two and was a total loss.
Princess Montagu	United States	1929 Bahamas hurricane: The cargo ship foundered at Nassau during a hurricane.
Wisconsin Bridge	United States	1929 Bahamas hurricane: The cargo ship was driven ashore in the Abaco Islands. She was declared a constructive total loss on 5 October.

=== 30 September ===
List of shipwrecks: 30 September 1929
Ship	State	Description
Fifetown	United Kingdom	The cargo ship ran aground at Öregrund, Uppsala County, Sweden and was abandoned.
Kotoshira Maru	Japan	The passenger ship ran aground at Miyekeijima and sank with the loss of all on board.
Shinko Maru	Japan	The cargo ship collided with a pod of whales 14 nautical miles (26 km) off Etorofu Island and foundered.

=== Unknown date ===
List of shipwrecks: Unknown date 1929
Ship	State	Description
Third International	Soviet Union	The ship foundered in the White Sea off the Solovetsky Islands.

== October ==
=== 2 October ===
List of shipwrecks: 2 October 1929
Ship	State	Description
Commandant Bultinck	Belgium	The 117-foot (36 m), 220-ton steam trawler ran aground off Fleetwood, Lancashire, United Kingdom, in a sleet storm with 80-mile-per-hour (130 km/h) winds with the loss of three lives. She was scrapped on site after attempts to refloat her failed.
Enterpriser	United Kingdom	The cargo ship struck the Tamise Bridge, Antwerp, Belgium and sank in the Scheldt. She was refloated on 7 October.
Favor	Venezuela	The auxiliary sailing vessel was destroyed by fire in the Caribbean Sea off the coast of Venezuela.
Wans Fell	United Kingdom	The ship collided with the drifter Girl Patricia (United Kingdom) in the North Sea off Hartlepool, County Durham and was consequently beached. Subsequently sold for scrap.

=== 3 October ===
List of shipwrecks: 3 October 1929
Ship	State	Description
Frank J. Brinton	United Kingdom	The schooner sank in the Strait of Belle Isle off Batteau, Labrador, Canada.
Koningin Elisabeth	Belgium	The cargo ship ran aground on Kuphonisi, Greece and was severely damaged. She was refloated on 10 October.

=== 5 October ===
List of shipwrecks: 5 October 1929
Ship	State	Description
NRP Adamastor	Portuguese Navy	The cruiser ran aground at Bolama, Portuguese Guinea. She was refloated on 7 October.
Belfri	Norway	The cargo ship ran aground in Bras d'Or Lake, Nova Scotia, Canada. She was refloated on 9 October.
Bretagne	France	The auxiliary sailing ship sprang a leak and was abandoned in the Pacific Ocean south off Cape Flattery, Washington, United States. The crew were rescued by Whitney Olsen (United States).

=== 6 October ===
List of shipwrecks: 6 October 1929
Ship	State	Description
Despina Glypti	Greece	The cargo ship ran aground at Constanţa, Romania. She was refloated on 11 October.

=== 7 October ===
List of shipwrecks: 7 October 1929
Ship	State	Description
Excelia	United States	During a voyage from Golovin to Elim, Territory of Alaska, with two passengers, a crew of two, a cargo of 5 tons of merchandise, and $2,300 of United States Mail aboard, the 9-gross register ton motor vessel was wrecked without loss of life on a shoal 7 nautical miles (13 km; 8.1 mi) south of the mouth of the Koyuk River.
Haakon VII	Norway	The passenger ship ran aground in Stavfjorden at Florø, Norway and sank with the loss of a number of lives.
Lauterfels	Germany	The cargo ship ran aground on Minicoy, Maldive Islands whilst going to the assistance of Höchst (Germany). She was refloated on 18 October.

=== 8 October ===
List of shipwrecks: 8 October 1929
Ship	State	Description
Chomedy	United Kingdom	The cargo ship ran aground at Tobago. She was refloated on 26 October.
Nyhavn	Norway	The cargo ship ran aground at Bajos Azagua, Niquero, Cuba. She was refloated on 10 October.

=== 10 October ===
List of shipwrecks: 10 October 1929
Ship	State	Description
Ada Tower	United Kingdom	The schooner sank in the Atlantic Ocean off Jacksonville, Florida, United States.
Cape La Have	United Kingdom	The schooner was driven ashore at Drum Point, Caicos and was a total loss. Her crew survived.
Consul Olsson	Sweden	The cargo ship ran aground at Florø, Norway. She was refloated but subsequently beached and was refloated again the next day.
Diamantis	Greece	The cargo ship ran aground east of Norraher Island, Sweden. She was declared a total loss on 18 October.

=== 11 October ===
List of shipwrecks: 11 October 1929
Ship	State	Description
Nicolaos Pateras	Greece	The cargo ship came ashore on the Norwegian coast (69°15′N 18°00′E). She was refloated on 14 October.

=== 12 October ===
List of shipwrecks: 12 October 1929
Ship	State	Description
Bednota	Soviet Navy	Sino-Soviet conflict of 1929: Battle of Sanjiangkou: The gunboat ran aground during the battle.
Dyan Nai	Republic of China Navy	Sino-Soviet conflict of 1929: Battle of Sanjiangkou: The gunboat was shelled and sunk by Sun Yat Sen (Soviet Navy).
Dyan Pai	Republic of China Navy	Sino-Soviet conflict of 1929: Battle of Sanjiangkou: The gunboat was shelled and sunk by Sun Yat Sen (Soviet Navy).
Lee Ju	Republic of China Navy	Sino-Soviet conflict of 1929: Battle of Sanjiangkou: The gunboat was shelled by Krasnyi Vostock (Soviet Navy) and run aground. The ship was later shelled and destroyed by Krasnyi Vostock.
Marta	(Denmark) Faroe Islands	The three-masted schooner caught fire in the North Sea off Fair Isle, United Kingdom. Her crew were rescued by the trawler Strathugie (United Kingdom).
USFS Widgeon	United States Bureau of Fisheries	The fishery patrol vessel ran aground without loss of life on Russian Reef off the Territory of Alaska's Whitewater Bay, suffering propeller and rudder damage. The rising tide refloated her, and she proceeded to port for repairs under her own power.
Zhang Ping	Republic of China Navy	Sino-Soviet conflict of 1929: Battle of Sanjiangkou: The gunboat was shelled and sunk by Krasnyi Vostock (Soviet Navy).

=== 13 October ===
List of shipwrecks: 13 October 1929
Ship	State	Description
Empress of Canada	United Kingdom	The ocean liner ran aground off Vancouver Island, British Columbia, Canada. Ninety-six passengers were taken off by tender and landed at Victoria. She was refloated on 15 October and towed to Esquimalt for drydocking.

=== 14 October ===
List of shipwrecks: 14 October 1929
Ship	State	Description
Hellen A	United States	With no one on board, the 10-gross register ton, 33-foot (10.1 m) motor vessel dragged her anchor during a gale and was wrecked in Pyramid Harbor (57°10′50″N 135°28′30″W) in Southeast Alaska, 4 nautical miles (7.4 km; 4.6 mi) southwest of Haines, Territory of Alaska.
Ruth May	United States	The 19-gross register ton, 41-foot (12.5 m) fishing vessel sank after striking a floating or submerged object approximately 2 nautical miles (3.7 km; 2.3 mi) north of Ryus Bay (58°04′40″N 152°45′50″W) in Southeast Alaska. Both people on board survived.
San Dunstano	United Kingdom	The tanker ran aground at Tampico, Mexico. She was declared a total loss on 16 October.

=== 15 October ===
List of shipwrecks: 15 October 1929
Ship	State	Description
Oklahoma	France	The cargo ship caught fire at Liverpool, Lancashire, United Kingdom. She broke her back and sank following and explosion.
Trebezy	France	The cargo ship ran aground at Cape Villano, Algeria. and was abandoned by her crew.

=== 16 October ===
List of shipwrecks: 16 October 1929
Ship	State	Description
Ferngarth	United Kingdom	The cargo ship collided with Hedrun (Sweden) in the English Channel off Le Havre, Seine Maritime, France and sank. Her crew were rescued by Hedrun. She was refloated on 5 November.
Pappinbarra	United Kingdom	The ship was a total loss at Sydney, New South Wales, Australia.

=== 17 October ===
List of shipwrecks: 17 October 1929
Ship	State	Description
Simson	Sweden	The dredger collided with Fernlane (Norway) at Luleå, Sweden and sank.

=== 19 October ===
List of shipwrecks: 19 October 1929
Ship	State	Description
Bowes Castle	United Kingdom	The cargo ship came ashore 26 nautical miles (48 km) north of Macassar, Dutch East Indies. She was refloated on 29 October.

=== 20 October ===
List of shipwrecks: 20 October 1929
Ship	State	Description
Dogue	France	The tug was in collision with Liberty (United States) at Le Havre, Seine Maritime and sank with the loss of two crew.
Lola	Belgium	The coaster capsized and sank in the English Channel off the Owers Lightship (United Kingdom) with the loss of nine of her twelve crew. Survivors were rescued by Scandinavia (Sweden).

=== 21 October ===
List of shipwrecks: 21 October 1929
Ship	State	Description
Yuen Lee	China	The cargo ship collided with Taian Maru (Japan) in the Yangtze at Shanghai and sank with the loss of a crew member.

=== 22 October ===
List of shipwrecks: 22 October 1929
Ship	State	Description
Milwaukee	United States	The train ferry foundered in Lake Michigan off Fox Point, Wisconsin in a gale in 115 feet (35 m) of water with the loss of all 52 hands. Wreck located 1972.
Veda M. McKown	United Kingdom	The schooner sank off Point Maurier, Quebec, Canada.

=== 25 October ===
List of shipwrecks: 25 October 1929
Ship	State	Description
Spray	United States	The 13-gross register ton, 50-foot (15 m) motor towing vessel was destroyed off Tatoosh Point (55°31′50″N 131°49′30″W) in Behm Canal in the Alexander Archipelago in Southeast Alaska by a fire that began when a clogged carburetor stopped her gasoline engine and the engine backfired during preparations to restart it, emitting a flame that set the entire engine room ablaze. Both members of her crew abandoned ship in a lifeboat and were rescued by the vessel T587 (United States).

=== 28 October ===
List of shipwrecks: 28 October 1929
Ship	State	Description
Zaire	Portugal	The cargo ship was driven ashore on São Tomé and was a total loss.

=== 29 October ===
List of shipwrecks: 29 October 1929
Ship	State	Description
Wisconsin	United States	The cargo ship foundered in Lake Michigan 4 nautical miles (7.4 km) off Kenosha, Wisconsin. Most of her crew was rescued.

=== 30 October ===
List of shipwrecks: 30 October 1929
Ship	State	Description
Eleni Stathatou	Greece	The cargo ship ran aground at Santo António, Principé. Salvage efforts were abandoned on 21 November.
Maremma	Italy	The cargo ship ran aground at Cala Honda, Grenada, Spain. She was refloated on 6 November.
Pattersonian	United Kingdom	The cargo ship ran aground at Ipswich, Suffolk. She was refloated on 3 November.
Senator	United States	The cargo ship collided with Marquette (United States) in Lake Michigan and sank with the loss of 24 of her 27 crew. Survivors were rescued by Marquette.

=== 31 October ===
List of shipwrecks: 31 October 1929
Ship	State	Description
Carew Castle	United Kingdom	The trawler, laid down as a Castle-class trawler, was wrecked on rocks in fog in the Bristol Channel near Culver Hole, west of Port Eynon Point, Gower Peninsula, 18 miles (29 km) west of Swansea, Wales. The crew walked to shore. Attempts to refloat the vessel in November failed and she was abandoned.
Dyan Tai	Republic of China Navy	Sino-Soviet conflict (1929): Battle of Fujin: The auxiliary gunboat was scuttled at Fugdin.
Dyan Tun	Republic of China Navy	Sino-Soviet conflict (1929): Battle of Fujin: The auxiliary gunboat was scuttled at Fugdin.
Dyan Un	Republic of China Navy	Sino-Soviet conflict (1929): Battle of Fujin: The auxiliary gunboat was scuttled at Fugdin.
Kiang Heng	Republic of China Navy	Sino-Soviet conflict (1929): Battle of Fujin: The Kian Yuan-class gunboat was bombed and sunk by Polikarpov MR-1 aircraft from Amur (Soviet Navy). Salvaged by the Chinese, captured by the Japanese but not repaired. Broken up in 1935.
Lee Chuan	Republic of China Navy	Sino-Soviet conflict (1929): Battle of Fujin: The armed transport was bombed and sunk by Polikarpov MR-1 aircraft from Amur (Soviet Navy).
Malrix	United Kingdom	The cargo ship collided with another vessel in the River Thames. She subsequently sank in the docks at Poplar.
Senator	United States	The bulk carrier, modified to transport automobiles and carrying a cargo of 268 new Nash automobiles from Milwaukee, Wisconsin, to Detroit, Michigan, sank with the loss of between seven and ten of her 28-member crew in Lake Michigan 20 miles (32 km) east of Port Washington, Wisconsin, eight minutes after the bulk carrier Marquette (United States) accidentally rammed her in dense fog. Marquette did not attempt to rescue survivors. The wreck lies in 460 feet (140 m) of water at 43°20′08″N 087°34′11″W in the Wisconsin Shipwreck Coast National Marine Sanctuary.

=== Unknown ===
List of shipwrecks: Unknown October 1929
Ship	State	Description
Chung Shan	Republic of China Navy	The Yung Feng-class gunboat was sunk at Canton, China by an ammunition explosion. Raised, repaired, returned to service.

== November ==
=== 1 November ===
List of shipwrecks: 1 November 1929
Ship	State	Description
Kontzesi	Spain	The cargo ship sank in the Bay of Biscay 7 nautical miles (13 km) off Ondarroa, Biscay when her boilers exploded. All hands were lost.
Sagoland	Sweden	The cargo ship was rammed and sunk by Gouverneur Général Tirman (France) at Port-Vendres, Pyrénées-Orientales, France.

=== 3 November ===
List of shipwrecks: 3 November 1929
Ship	State	Description
Henri Gerlinger	Belgium	The cargo ship collided with Kronos (Germany) in the Scheldt and was beached. She was refloated later that day.

=== 4 November ===
List of shipwrecks: 4 November 1929
Ship	State	Description
Gilbert San	Australia	The fishing boat was wrecked at Cape Howe, on the New South Wales/Victoria border.
Linda Pardy	United Kingdom	The schooner sprang a leak and sank off Cape Mabon, Nova Scotia, Canada.

=== 5 November ===
List of shipwrecks: 5 November 1929
Ship	State	Description
Explora	United States	The 10-gross register ton motor vessel was destroyed by fire at "Herring Creek" – probably a reference to Herring Cove (55.3250°N 131.5222°W) – on the east coast of Wrangell Island in the Alexander Archipelago in Southeast Alaska. Her crew of two survived.

=== 5 November ===
List of shipwrecks: 5 November 1929
Ship	State	Description
Snarø	Norway	The cargo ship ran aground north of Åland, Finland and was abandoned as a total loss.

=== 6 November ===
List of shipwrecks: 6 November 1929
Ship	State	Description
Atlantide	Italy	The cargo ship collided with Barbana G (Italy) in the Nieuwe Waterweg at Rotterdam, Netherlands and was beached. She was refloated on 13 November.

=== 7 November ===
List of shipwrecks: 7 November 1929
Ship	State	Description
Concordia	Italy	The cargo ship ran aground 15 nautical miles (28 km) east of Father Point, Quebec, Canada. She was refloated on 14 November.
Conehatta	United States	The cargo ship ran aground in the Gulf of Bothnia near Storbaden, Sweden. She caught fire and was abandoned. She sank the next day.

=== 8 November ===
List of shipwrecks: 8 November 1929
Ship	State	Description
Arethusa	United Kingdom	The schooner came ashore at Halifax, Nova Scotia, Canada and was a total loss.
Bossuet	France	The barque came ashore 2 nautical miles (3.7 km) south of Cap Gris Nez, Pas-de-Calais and was wrecked. Her crew were rescued.
Galathea	Denmark	The schooner passed Spithead bound for Bideford, Devon, United Kingdom. No further trace, presumed foundered with the loss of all hands.
Maria Victoria	Spain	The cargo ship ran aground at Cape Villano, Algeria. She broke in two and was a total loss. One crew member was killed.
Planet	Germany	The cargo ship ran aground at Sarco, Chile. She was refloated on 19 December.

=== 9 November ===
List of shipwrecks: 9 November 1929
Ship	State	Description
Alaska	United States	After her wooden hull had rotted and her owner had decided she had lost all her value, the 53-gross register ton steamer was towed into Zimovia Strait in the Alexander Archipelago in Southeast Alaska 3 nautical miles (5.6 km; 3.5 mi) south of Wrangell, Territory of Alaska, and abandoned.

=== 10 November ===
List of shipwrecks: 10 November 1929
Ship	State	Description
Grace	United Kingdom	The schooner was abandoned 15 nautical miles (28 km) west north west of Cabot Island, Nova Scotia, Canada. She drifted ashore on Silver Fox Island and was a total loss.

=== 11 November ===
List of shipwrecks: 11 November 1929
Ship	State	Description
Garthpool	United Kingdom	The four-masted ship ran aground on Boa Vista, Cape Verde Islands, Portugal. She was a total loss.
Nimbo	Italy	The cargo ship was driven ashore at Brighton, Sussex, United Kingdom. All crew were rescued.
Kanatak	United States	The 43-gross register ton, 62-foot (18.9 m) halibut-fishing vessel was seen for the last time, 30 nautical miles (56 km; 35 mi) northeast of Cape Saint Elias on Kayak Island on the south-central coast of Alaska. She subsequently disappeared in a storm with the loss of her entire crew of nine.
Onward	United Kingdom	The Thames barge was driven ashore at Warden Point, Isle of Sheppey, Kent. Both crew were rescued by the Southend Lifeboat. She was refloated the next day.

=== 12 November ===
List of shipwrecks: 12 November 1929
Ship	State	Description
Hillside II	United States	The 34-gross register ton motor vessel sank in the Gulf of Alaska 65 nautical miles (120 km; 75 mi) west of Ocean Cape (59°32′30″N 139°51′30″W) on the south-central coast of the Territory of Alaska after losing her rudder. The motor vessel Middleton (United States) rescued her crew of seven.
Nixe	Germany	The cargo ship lost her tow and was driven ashore on Skagen, Denmark. Her crew survived.

=== 13 November ===
List of shipwrecks: 13 November 1929
Ship	State	Description
Fylla	Denmark	The schooner ran aground near Gothenburg, Sweden and was abandoned. She was later refloated and towed to Lysekil. Fylla was declared a constructive total loss.

=== 14 November ===
List of shipwrecks: 14 November 1929
Ship	State	Description
Osric	United Kingdom	The cargo ship collided with Hannah Jolliffe (United Kingdom) in Swansea Bay and was beached.
Thordoc	United Kingdom	The cargo ship came ashore at Porphyry Point, Lake Superior. Although declared a total loss, She was refloated on 5 December.

=== 15 November ===
List of shipwrecks: 15 November 1929
Ship	State	Description
Depere	United States	The 3,475-ton, 320-foot (97.5 m) cargo ship struck rocks at Cape Decision, Territory of Alaska, and was beached in a sinking condition near Port McArthur an hour later. Her crew of 35 survived, and she later was salvaged and returned to service.

=== 17 November ===
List of shipwrecks: 17 November 1929
Ship	State	Description
Helen Vair	United Kingdom	The schooner was driven out to sea in a gale at Halifax, Nova Scotia, Canada. Her crew were rescued on 19 November by Terne (Norway) and she was left in a sinking condition.
Inger	Denmark	The motor schooner collided with another vessel at Dragør and sank. She was refloated on 21 November.

=== 18 November ===
List of shipwrecks: 18 November 1929
Ship	State	Description
Christine	Netherlands	The cargo ship collided with Maria P. Xila (Greece) at Sulina, Romania and was beached.
Tours	France	The cargo ship ran aground at Assinie, Côte d'Ivoire. She was refloated on 22 November.

=== 19 November ===
List of shipwrecks: 19 November 1929
Ship	State	Description
Briton	United States	The cargo ship ran aground at Buffalo, New York. She was declared a total loss on 4 December.

=== 20 November ===
List of shipwrecks: 20 November 1929
Ship	State	Description
Alda	Germany	The cargo ship collided with Pioneer (Belgium) in the Paraná River at Buenos Aires, Argentina and was beached.
Quebec Trader	United Kingdom	The auxiliary schooner was driven ashore at Sainte-Anne-des-Monts, Quebec, Canada and was a total loss. Her crew were rescued.
Sea Bird	United States	At anchor off Wingham Island in Prince William Sound in the Territory of Alaska since 14 November after suffering severe damage during a gale in the Gulf of Alaska off Cape Saint Elias on 11 November that carried away her pilot house, other deck structures, and two members of her seven-man crew, the 41-gross register ton, 51.6-foot (15.7 m) halibut-fishing schooner was driven ashore and wrecked on Wingham Island without further loss of life by another gale. The cutter USCGC Unalga ( United States Coast Guard) picked up her five surviving crewmen from Wingham Island on 27 November.

=== 22 November ===
List of shipwrecks: 22 November 1929
Ship	State	Description
Parizhskaya Kommuna	Soviet Navy	The Gangut-class battleship was severely damaged at the bow in a storm in the Bay of Biscay. She put in to Brest, Finistère, France for repairs.
P. G. Halvorsen	Norway	The cargo ship ran aground at Suances, Cantabria, Spain. She was refloated on 17 March 1930.

=== 23 November ===
List of shipwrecks: 23 November 1929
Ship	State	Description
Gladstone	United States	The 35-gross register ton motor vessel was destroyed by fire while moored for her winter layup in Hood Bay (57°23′N 134°24′W) on the west coast of Admiralty Island in the Alexander Archipelago in Southeast Alaska. Her crew of five survived

=== 25 November ===
List of shipwrecks: 25 November 1929
Ship	State	Description
British Chemist	United Kingdom	The tanker exploded at Grangemouth, Cumberland and was severely damaged.
Molesey	United Kingdom	The cargo ship was driven ashore on Skomer, Pembrokeshire and was wrecked with the loss of seven of her 33 crew.

=== 28 November ===
List of shipwrecks: 28 November 1929
Ship	State	Description}
Betty Alden	United States	While tied up for the winter at Steamboat Wharf in Hull, Massachusetts, the paddle steamer was destroyed by fire.
Goleta	United Kingdom	The cargo ship ran aground at Greenore, County Louth, Ireland. She was refloated on 12 December.
Mars	United States	The tug ran aground at the edge of the channel at Hull, Massachusetts, while attempting to assist burning paddle steamers at Steamboat Wharf.
Mary Chilton	United States	While tied up for the winter at Steamboat Wharf in Hull, Massachusetts, the paddle steamer was destroyed by fire.
Mayflower	United States	While tied up for the winter at Steamboat Wharf in Hull, Massachusetts, the paddle steamer was damaged by fire. She was pulled free, repaired, and returned to service.
Nantasket	United States	While tied up for the winter at Steamboat Wharf in Hull, Massachusetts, the paddle steamer was destroyed by fire.
Old Colony	United States	While tied up for the winter at Steamboat Wharf in Hull, Massachusetts, the paddle steamer was destroyed by fire.
Rose Standish	United States	While tied up for the winter at Steamboat Wharf in Hull, Massachusetts, the paddle steamer was destroyed by fire.

=== 29 November ===
List of shipwrecks: 29 November 1929
Ship	State	Description
Alicante	United Kingdom	The schooner was driven ashore at Boxey Point, Newfoundland and was a total loss. Her crew survived.
Bujun Maru	Japan	The cargo ship ran aground at Sanshokaku, Keelung, Formosa. She broke in tow and sank on 4 December.
Norwich City	United Kingdom	The cargo ship ran aground on Nikumaroro Island in the Phoenix Islands and was wrecked with the loss of eleven of her 35 crew.

=== 30 November ===
List of shipwrecks: 30 November 1929
Ship	State	Description
Kiowa	United States	The cargo ship was wrecked on Point Au Sable, Lake Superior in a Gale, a total loss. 5 crewmen killed, 18 rescued by the United States Coast Guard.

== December ==
=== 1 December ===
List of shipwrecks: 1 December 1929
Ship	State	Description
Catherine B	United Kingdom	The schooner was abandoned in the Atlantic Ocean (47°47′N 51°22′W). Her crew were rescued.

=== 2 December ===
List of shipwrecks: 2 December 1929
Ship	State	Description
Kiowa	United States	The cargo ship came ashore in Lake Michigan at Amble Point, Michigan with the loss of six crew.
Panaghiotis	Greece	The cargo ship ran aground on Hovens Rock, Axim, Gold Coast and was wrecked.

=== 3 December ===
List of shipwrecks: 3 December 1929
Ship	State	Description
Bärenfels	Germany	The cargo ship ran aground in the Persian Gulf 24 nautical miles (44 km) south of Bahrein. She was refloated on 11 December.
Lily Melling	United Kingdom	The 125.6-foot (38.3 m), 246-ton steam trawler ran aground in Islay Sound and abandoned as a total loss. She was salvaged, repaired and returned to service in 1930.

=== 4 December ===
List of shipwrecks: 4 December 1929
Ship	State	Description
Werra	Germany	The cargo ship collided with Hanau (Germany) in the Scheldt and was beached at Terneuzen, Netherlands. She was refloated later that day and towed to Antwerp, Belgium.

=== 5 December ===
List of shipwrecks: 5 December 1929
Ship	State	Description
Erema H	United Kingdom	The schooner was driven ashore at Cat Harbour, Newfoundland and was a total loss.
Eva June	United Kingdom	The schooner was driven ashore at Seldom-Little Seldom, Newfoundland and was a total loss.
Fairland	United Kingdom	The cargo ship was driven ashore at Ard na Caithne, County Kerry, Ireland. Her crew were rescued.
Francis Duncan	United Kingdom	The cargo ship foundered in the Atlantic Ocean off Land's End, Cornwall with the loss of sixteen of her 21 crew. Survivors were rescued by Alice Marie (United Kingdom).

=== 6 December ===
List of shipwrecks: 6 December 1929
Ship	State	Description
Ägir	Germany	The freighter, a converted former Odin-class coastal defense ship, ran aground on Stora Karlsö, Sweden in fog and high winds, and was wrecked beyond repair in a storm on 8 December while waiting for tugs. One crewman died.
Merwede	Netherlands	The coaster was driven ashore 2 nautical miles (3.7 km) east of Newhaven, Sussex, United Kingdom. All ten crew were rescued by breeches buoy. She was refloated on 20 December.
Merry Widow	United Kingdom	The schooner foundered in the Atlantic (47°48′N 51°45′W). Her crew were rescued.
Northern Light	United Kingdom	The schooner sprang a leak in the Atlantic Ocean (45°54′N 43°32′W) and was abandoned with the loss of one of her six crew. Survivors were rescued by Baltic (United Kingdom).

=== 7 December ===
List of shipwrecks: 7 December 1929
Ship	State	Description
Casmona	Italy	The cargo ship was abandoned in the English Channel (49°35′N 3°14′W). Her crew were rescued by RMS Arlanza (United Kingdom) and Hansi (Norway).
Chieri	Italy	The cargo ship foundered in the Bay of Biscay 80 nautical miles (150 km) off Ouessant, Finistère, France (approximately 47°N 6°W) with the loss of 35 of her 41 crew. Survivors were rescued by the trawler Gascoyne (France).
Don	Norway	The cargo ship was driven ashore at Aberavon, Glamorgan. She was refloated on 17 December.
Helene	Denmark	The cargo ship was abandoned in the Bay of Biscay after her tow broke. She came ashore in the Raz de Sein, Finistère and was wrecked with the loss of a crew member.
John Charlton	United Kingdom	The cargo ship was driven ashore at Quayhaven, Dorset.
Mogens Koch	Denmark	The four-masted schooner was driven ashore at Cuckmere, Sussex, United Kingdom. Her crew were rescued. She was refloated on 17 December.
Ornais II	France	The collier was driven ashore at Perranuthnoe, Cornwall, United Kingdom and wrecked. All crew survived.
Radyr	United Kingdom	The cargo ship foundered in the Bristol Channel off the coast of Devon with the loss of all 25 crew.
Volumna	United Kingdom	The cargo ship was abandoned in the Atlantic Ocean (51°16′N 27°43′W) and sank. Her crew were rescued by Manchester Regiment (United Kingdom).

=== 8 December ===
List of shipwrecks: 8 December 1929
Ship	State	Description
Isla de Panay	Spain	The passenger ship was driven ashore between San Carlos and Santa Isabel. All on board were rescued.
Kostantis Lemos	Greece	The cargo ship ran aground off Garding, Schleswig-Holstein, Germany.

=== 9 December ===
List of shipwrecks: 9 December 1929
Ship	State	Description
Benwyvis	United Kingdom	The cargo ship was driven ashore on Terschelling, Netherlands. She was refloated on 16 January 1930.
Kenkyu Maru	Japan	The cargo ship ran aground and sank. Her crew were rescued by Fathomer ( United States Coast and Geodetic Survey) and landed at Sandakan, Borneo.
Marie Llewellyn	United Kingdom	The cargo ship was hit by Mamilus (United Kingdom) at Falmouth, Cornwall and was beached.
Miepah	United Kingdom	The tug sank at North Woolwich, London.
Notre Dame de Bonne Nouvelle	France	The sailing ship foundered in the Bay of Biscay. Her crew were rescued.

=== 10 December ===
List of shipwrecks: 10 December 1929
Ship	State	Description
Makalla	United Kingdom	The four-masted schooner came ashore north of Gothenburg, Sweden and was wrecked. Her crew were rescued.
Saint Louis	France	The brigantine foundered in the Atlantic Ocean (49°00′N 8°45′W). Her crew were rescued by Erik Frisell (Sweden).

=== 12 December ===
List of shipwrecks: 12 December 1929
Ship	State	Description
Janie E. Blackwood	United Kingdom	The schooner was abandoned in the Atlantic Ocean (47°40′N 50°08′W). Her crew were rescued by Nova Scotia (United Kingdom).

=== 13 December ===
List of shipwrecks: 13 December 1929
Ship	State	Description
Antonio Garcia	Spain	The cargo ship collided with Hydra (Greece) in the Atlantic Ocean off Vigo, Galicia, Spain and sank with the loss of four crew. Survivors were rescued by Hydra.
Hawkinge	United Kingdom	The cargo ship ran aground at Cape Finisterre, Spain and was wrecked. All crew were rescued.
Lingfield	United Kingdom	The Thames barge collided with Steadfast (United States) in the River Thames at Greenwich, London and sank. Both crew were rescued.
HMS Tormentor	Royal Navy	The R-class destroyer foundered in the Irish Sea off Manorbier, Pembrokeshire with the loss of all four crew. She was under tow to be scrapped at Troon, Ayrshire.

=== 14 December ===
List of shipwrecks: 14 December 1929
Ship	State	Description
Brazos	United States	The cargo ship ran aground at Galveston, Texas. She was refloated on 18 December.
Cabo Espichel	Portugal	The sailing ship ran aground at Portimao and was wrecked.
Southern Sea	United Kingdom	The whaler struck an icefloe in the Ross Sea and sank. Her crew were rescued by Southern Princess (United Kingdom).

=== 15 December ===
List of shipwrecks: 15 December 1929
Ship	State	Description
Cabo Oropesa	Spain	The cargo ship collided with Ciss (Norway) off Ons Island, Spain, and sank. Her crew were rescued by Ciss.
Marigo	Greece	The sailing ship sank at Chania, Crete.
Skagway	United States	The 1,838-ton steamer burned at the Tatoosh Islands (58°57′N 152°15′W) in Southeast Alaska. All 27 people on board survived.

=== 17 December ===
List of shipwrecks: 17 December 1929
Ship	State	Description
Manuka	United Kingdom	The cargo liner ran aground on Long Point, Dunedin, New Zealand and was wrecked. All on board were rescued.
Ornen	Sweden	The schooner was abandoned in the Baltic Sea north of Gotska Sandön. Her crew were rescued.
Skagway	United States	The cargo ship ran aground on Tatoosh Island, Washington and was wrecked. Her crew were rescued by USCGC Snohomish (United States Coast Guard).

=== 18 December ===
List of shipwrecks: 18 December 1929
Ship	State	Description
Fort Victoria	United Kingdom	Bound for Bermuda from New York City, the 7,784-gross register ton cruise ship collided with the ocean liner Algonquin (United States) in the Ambrose Channel off New York City, United States, and sank in 50 feet (15 m) of water at 40°28.907′N 073°54.398′W. All 371 passengers and crew on board were rescued.
R. L. Borden	United Kingdom	The schooner was driven ashore at Harbour Breton, Newfoundland, and was wrecked.

=== 20 December ===
List of shipwrecks: 20 December 1929
Ship	State	Description
Onderneming	Netherlands	The tug suffered an onboard explosion and sank at Groningen, the Netherlands with loss of life.
Venator	United States	The cargo ship ran aground 5 nautical miles (9.3 km) west of Puerto México, Veracruz, Mexico. She was refloated on 13 May 1930.

=== 21 December ===
List of shipwrecks: 21 December 1929
Ship	State	Description
Georg	Norway	The cargo ship was anchored off Blyth, Northumberland (56°10′N 1°30′W) and abandoned.
HDMS Thor	Royal Danish Navy	The patrol vessel was wrecked in Húnaflói. Her crew were rescued.

=== 22 December ===
List of shipwrecks: 22 December 1929
Ship	State	Description
Lairdselm	United Kingdom	The cargo ship capsized and sank in the North Channel. All eighteen crew survived.

=== 23 December ===
List of shipwrecks: 23 December 1929
Ship	State	Description
Marialuisa	Italy	The cargo ship sprang a leak in the Mediterranean Sea (30°25′N 30°50′E) and was abandoned. Her 26 crew were rescued by Viceroy of India (United Kingdom).
Somme	United Kingdom	The cargo ship ran aground in the Guaíba River, Brazil. She was refloated on 27 December.

=== 24 December ===
List of shipwrecks: 24 December 1929
Ship	State	Description
Aslaug	Norway	The coaster ran aground at Bayona, Galicia, Spain and sank with the loss of all 22 crew.
Junior	Norway	The coaster sprung a leak and foundered in a gale in the North Sea 40 nautical miles (74 km) off Rattray Head, Aberdeenshire, United Kingdom. All ten crew were rescued by the trawler Embassy (United Kingdom).
Kingwo	United Kingdom	The cargo ship ran aground in the Yangtze 30 nautical miles (56 km) upstream of Ichang, China. She was refloated on 28 December.
Lee Cheong	China	The passenger ship foundered in the South China Sea with the loss of about 220 lives.
Silveray	United Kingdom	The cargo ship ran aground at Riff Denbril, 65 nautical miles (120 km) south of Makassar, Dutch East Indies. She was refloated on 30 December.

=== 25 December ===
List of shipwrecks: 25 December 1929
Ship	State	Description
Varna	Bulgaria	The cargo liner collided with Chrissi (Greece) in the Mediterranean Sea (approximately 40°N 28°E) and sank with the loss of 27 of the 32 people on board. Survivors were rescued by Chrissi.

=== 26 December ===
List of shipwrecks: 26 December 1929
Ship	State	Description
Baltabor	United Kingdom	The cargo ship ran aground on Naissar, Estonia. She was refloated on 28 March 1930.
Cannakale	Italy	The hydroplane foundered in the Mediterranean Sea south of Strati Island with the loss of nine lives.
Ustetind	Norway	The cargo ship ran aground at Silwick, Shetland Islands and was wrecked. Her crew were rescued.

=== 27 December ===
List of shipwrecks: 27 December 1929
Ship	State	Description
O.B.S.	France	The three-masted schooner caught fire in the North Sea off the Maas Lightship (Netherlands) and was a total loss. Her crew were rescued.
Shuho	China	The auxiliary sailing ship caught fire in the Yangtze downstream of Ichang and was a total loss.

=== 28 December ===
List of shipwrecks: 28 December 1929
Ship	State	Description
Yorkminster	United Kingdom	The cargo ship ran aground on the Cabzos Shoals and was beached at Gibraltar.

=== 29 December ===
List of shipwrecks: 29 December 1929
Ship	State	Description
Abeille No.1	France	The tug was sunk at Le Havre, Seine Maritime when a dockside crane was blown down in a gale. Three crew were lost.
Hermine	Germany	The coaster ran aground at Margate, Kent and was abandoned, All twelve people on board were rescued by a pilot boat. She later refloated and drifted into the North Sea.

=== 30 December ===
List of shipwrecks: 30 December 1929
Ship	State	Description
George A. Wood	United Kingdom	The three-masted schooner was driven ashore on Sable Island, Nova Scotia, Canada and was wrecked. Her crew were rescued.
Maroc	Belgium	The cargo ship ran aground at Ras el Amar, Tunisia. She was refloated on 10 January 1930.
Wards Cove	United States	During a voyage from Ketchikan to Neets Bay, Territory of Alaska, the 34-gross register ton, 58.1-foot (17.7 m) fishing vessel was destroyed in Clover Pass opposite Hump Island by a fire that began when her engine backfired while her captain was draining its carburetor, igniting gasoline. Both people on board survived.

=== 31 December ===
List of shipwrecks: 31 December 1929
Ship	State	Description
George Watts	United Kingdom	The cargo ship ran aground at Calabar, Nigeria.
Mercedes	France	The schooner was driven ashore at Wyk auf Föhr, Schleswig-Holstein, Germany and was a total loss.
Theofano	Greece	The cargo ship ran aground on Socorro Island, Mexico. She broke up on 2 January 1930 and was a total loss.

== Unknown date ==
List of shipwrecks: Unknown date 1929
Ship	State	Description
Albatros	Soviet Union	The barque foundered in the White Sea. She was refloated 1932 and then scrapped.
Gloria	United Kingdom	The Thames barge capsized and sank with the loss of two crew.
Marjorie M	United States	With no one on board, the 14-gross register ton, 40-foot (12.2 m) fishing vessel was destroyed by fire at Haines, Territory of Alaska.
San Antonio	Germany	The sailing ship capsized near Copenhagen, Denmark. She was salvaged and returned to service.
Unidentified derrick barge	United States	The "Haltiner barge" The unidentified wooden derrick barge sank in Lake Huron off the coast of Michigan probably circa 1929. Known as the "Haltiner barge," its wreck lies in 13 feet (4 m) of water at 45.03485°N 83.326583°W.
