= Stan Hugill =

British folk musician, artist and sea music historian

- Hugill c. 1979

Background information
- Born: Stanley James Hugill; 19 November 1906; Hoylake, Cheshire, England
- Died: 13 May 1992 (aged 85) Aberystwyth, Ceredigion, Wales
- Genres: Folk music
- Occupations: Merchant seaman, shanty-man, historian
- Instrument: Vocals
- Years active: 1950–1992
- Formerly of: Stormalong John

Stanley James Hugill (/ˈhjuːɡɪl/) (19 November 1906 – 13 May 1992) was a British folk music performer, artist and sea music historian, known as the "Last Working Shantyman" and described as the "20th century guardian of the tradition".

== Biography ==
He was born in Hoylake, Cheshire, England, to Henry James Hugill and Florence Mary Hugill (née Southwood). His sailing career started in 1922, and he retired to dry land in 1945. He notably served as the shantyman on the Garthpool, the last British commercial sailing ship (a "Limejuice Cape Horner"), on her last voyage which ended when she was wrecked on 11 November 1929 off the Cape Verde Islands.

Hugill was helmsman on the SS Automedon on November 11, 1940 when she was sunk by the German auxiliary cruiser Atlantis. The British steamer was carrying secret mail for the Far East Command, including papers on the strength of British forces in the Far East and detail on Singapore's defences.

After four and a half years as a German prisoner of war during World War II, Hugill was an instructor at the Outward Bound Sea School in Aberdyfi from 1950 to 1975. In the 1950s he also taught sailing skills (and sang sea shanties) on the sail-training ship Pamir but was not on its ill-fated last voyage. Fluent in Japanese and Spanish (as well as speaking Maori, Malay, and Chinese and various Polynesian dialects), he also worked as a Japanese translator from 1951 to 1959.

He married Bronwen Irene Benbow in 1952; they had two children, Philip and Martin. He anchored the BBC programme Dance and Skylark from 1965 to 1966, and wrote monthly the column "Bosun's Locker" for Spin (a Liverpool folksong magazine).

When laid up with a broken leg in the 1950s, he began to write down the shanties that he had learned at sea, eventually authoring several books and releasing several LPs of performances later in coordination with a Merseyside folk group called Stormalong John. Although "shanty" is also spelled "chantey", Hugill used the former exclusively in his books.

=== Stan Hugill Memorial Trophy ===
As of 1993, the Stan Hugill Memorial Trophy is awarded to the winner of the Tall Ships' Crews Shanty Competition. The competition became international in scope in 2000 when it was held in Douarnenez, France. The jury for this inaugural international competition, awarded First Prize to Tom Lewis; an Irish/Canadian performer and songwriter.

== Recordings and publications ==
=== Books ===
- The Bosun's Locker, Collected Articles 1962-1973 (Heron Publishing, 2006)
- Shanties from the Seven Seas (1961; abridged edition 1984)
- Sailortown (1967)
- Shanties and Sailor Songs (1969)
- Sea Shanties (1977)
- Songs of the Sea (1977)

=== Recordings ===
- Shanties from the Seven Seas (1962, HMV)
- Aboard the Cutty Sark
- A Salty Fore Topman
- Chants des Marins Anglais
- Sailing Days
- Stan Hugill Reminisces
- Stan Hugill
- Men and the Sea Men
- Sea Songs: Newport, Rhode Island - Songs from the Age of Sail (with The X Seamen's Institute and David Jones)
- Sea Songs: Louis Killen, Stan Hugill and The X Seamen's Institute sing of Cape Horn sailing at the Seattle Chantey Festival (with Louis Killen and The X Seamen's Institute).
- When the Wind Blows
- Pusser's Rum Sailing Songs (1990)

=== Video ===
- Stan Hugill, The Last Shantyman
- All I Ask is a Tall Ship ("The World About Us" BBC TV)
- The Last Voyage of the Garthpool ("Yesterday's Witness" BBC TV)

== Other sources ==
- "The old man of the sea shanty," Stan Hugill obituary. The Guardian, September 11, 1992, Features section.
- The Last Windjammer Boy
- Gale Literary Database of Contemporary Authors.
