= Garthpool =

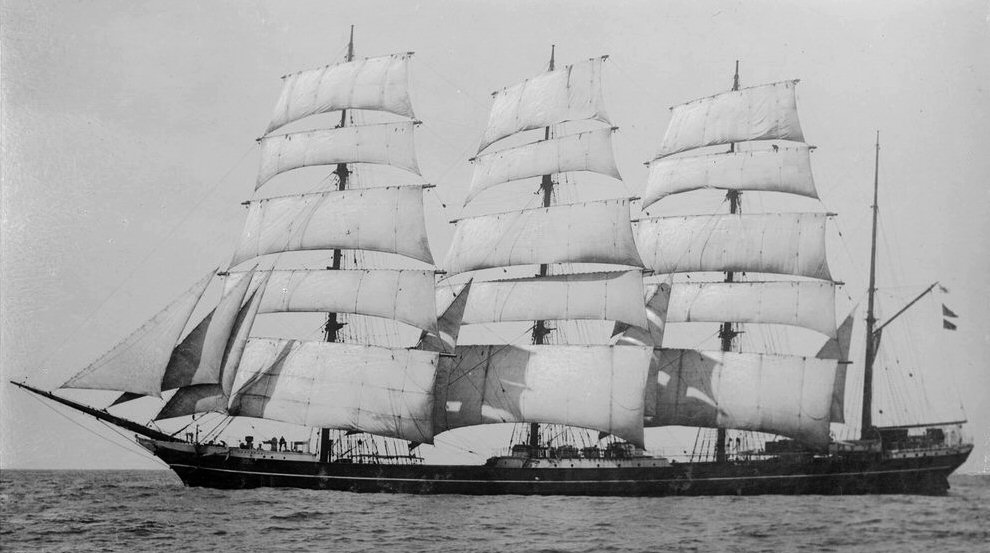
- Garthpool

History

United Kingdom
- Name: Juteopolis
- Ordered: 1891
- Launched: 3 December 1891

Canada
- Name: Garthpool
- Port of registry: Montreal
- Acquired: 1917
- Fate: ran aground (wrecked), 11 November 1929

General characteristics
- Type: Barque
- Tonnage: 2,842 GRT
- Length: 94.5 m (310 ft 0 in)
- Beam: 13.7 m (44 ft 11 in)
- Complement: 34 crew, 7 passengers
- Notes: Rigging: four-masted steel barque rigged with double topgallant sails over double topsails and no royal sails, as a very special feature the topgallant masts attached aft of the topmast

Garthpool was a steel-hulled four-masted barque rigged in "jubilee" or "baldheaded" fashion, i.e. without royal sails over the top-gallant sails, active in the early part of the 20th century. She was said to have been the last commercial square-rigged sailing ship under a British flag.

== Construction ==
The vessel was built at the Caledon Shipbuilding & Engineering Company yard of W. B. Thompson in Dundee, Scotland, for Captain Charles Barrie, and launched on 3 December 1891. It was built specifically for the jute trade, but only made a few voyages carrying jute before the business became unprofitable, and shifted to other cargoes.

== Service ==
Its first owner was the Den Line of Dundee. On 31 August 1899 the Juteopolis, together with her sister ship, Lawhill, was sold to the Lawhill Sailing Ship Co. Ltd. (F. E. Bliss, manager), London. In June 1900 the barque was transferred to the Anglo-American Oil Company. Between 1900 and 1911 Juteopolis operated in the Pacific under the Anglo-American Oil Company, carrying case oil. In 1911 both vessels were acquired (Juteopolis for an estimated £6,500) by Liverpool shipowner George Windram and Co. and used for general cargoes.

In 1917, ownership switched to the Marine Navigation Company of Canada, owned by Sir William Garthwaite, and three years later the vessel was renamed Garthpool. Its port of registry from 1924 was Montreal – still technically under a British flag.

The ship was mothballed for two years from 1921 after a slump in freight prices then resumed general cargo duties. Her final role was in the grain trade, plying between Adelaide, Australia, and Kingston-upon-Hull, UK.

The Royal Museums Greenwich notes: "She was not fast, her passages often exceeding 120 days."

In mid 1929 Garthpool was photographed mid-Atlantic by William Frank Bramhill, a 16-year-old seaman making his first ocean-going trip, with Garthpool making its last complete journey.

The vessel docked at Hull then weeks later set out in ballast. On 11 November, Garthpool ran aground and was wrecked at Boavista, Cape Verde. There were no casualties.

One notable crew member was the folk singer Stan Hugill, who sailed on Garthpool's final trip.

== Legacy ==
Garthpool was painted in oils by marine artist Derek Gardner in 1967. The work is in the care of the British National Maritime Museum.
