= Stormalong John =

British sea shanty group

Stormalong John were a British maritime folk group based in Liverpool, England, specialising in sea shanties and sailor songs. Founded in 1984, they performed for thirty years at concerts, festivals and maritime events throughout Britain and Europe before disbanding in 2014.

== History ==
The group came together in 1984 when Tony Davis of The Spinners (English band) organised a series of open-air performances at the International Garden Festival in Liverpool, gathering a group of Merseyside folksingers and instrumentalists to perform as a group. Shortly afterwards they were invited to sing at local venues, then folk festivals, and eventually at shanty events abroad. Their membership changed over thirty years; confirmed members included Arthur Garnett, Tony Molyneux (born Tony Wilson; died 2004), Charlie Scott, Harry Lowrey, Jack Coutts, Keith Price, Frank McCall (died 2006), Shay Black, Dave MacLurg, Dai Jones, Bill Jones and Mark Garnett.

The group became regular performers at major maritime festivals across Britain and Europe, including concerts in Berlin, Hamburg, Venice, Rotterdam, Brest and Krakow, and at numerous festivals in Holland, Scandinavia and Brittany. They were closely associated with Stan Hugill, the last English shantyman; first asked to accompany him on stage at a festival in the late 1980s, the collaboration spanned numerous live performances and two albums. The group disbanded in 2014.

Name

The group took their name from Alfred Bulltop Stormalong — also known as Old Stormy — a mythical figure in sailors' lore representing the idealised deepwater captain who treated his crew with decency.

=== Albums ===
Year	Title	Format	Label	Cat. No.	Notes
1987	Bound Out of Liverpool	Cassette	Not on label	RTS 1548	
1989	A Salty Fore Topman	Cassette (UK); CD (US)	Not on label	SH001 (cassette); SHCD02 (CD)	With Stan Hugill
1989	The Shantyman	Cassette	Kliper spółka z o.o.	—	With Stan Hugill
1990	Any Port in a Storm	Cassette	Not on label	RTS 3334	
1992	Chants des Marins Anglais	CD	Le Chasse-Marée	SCM 021	With Stan Hugill
1993	Sailing Days	CD	Not on label	SHCD003	With Stan Hugill

=== Compilations ===
Year	Title	Format	Label	Cat. No.
1991	Liverpool	CD	Not on label	STJ 5495, B7409
Unknown	A Liverpool Packet		Not on label	STJ 4495
