= Lawhill =

Steel-hulled barque active 1892-1949

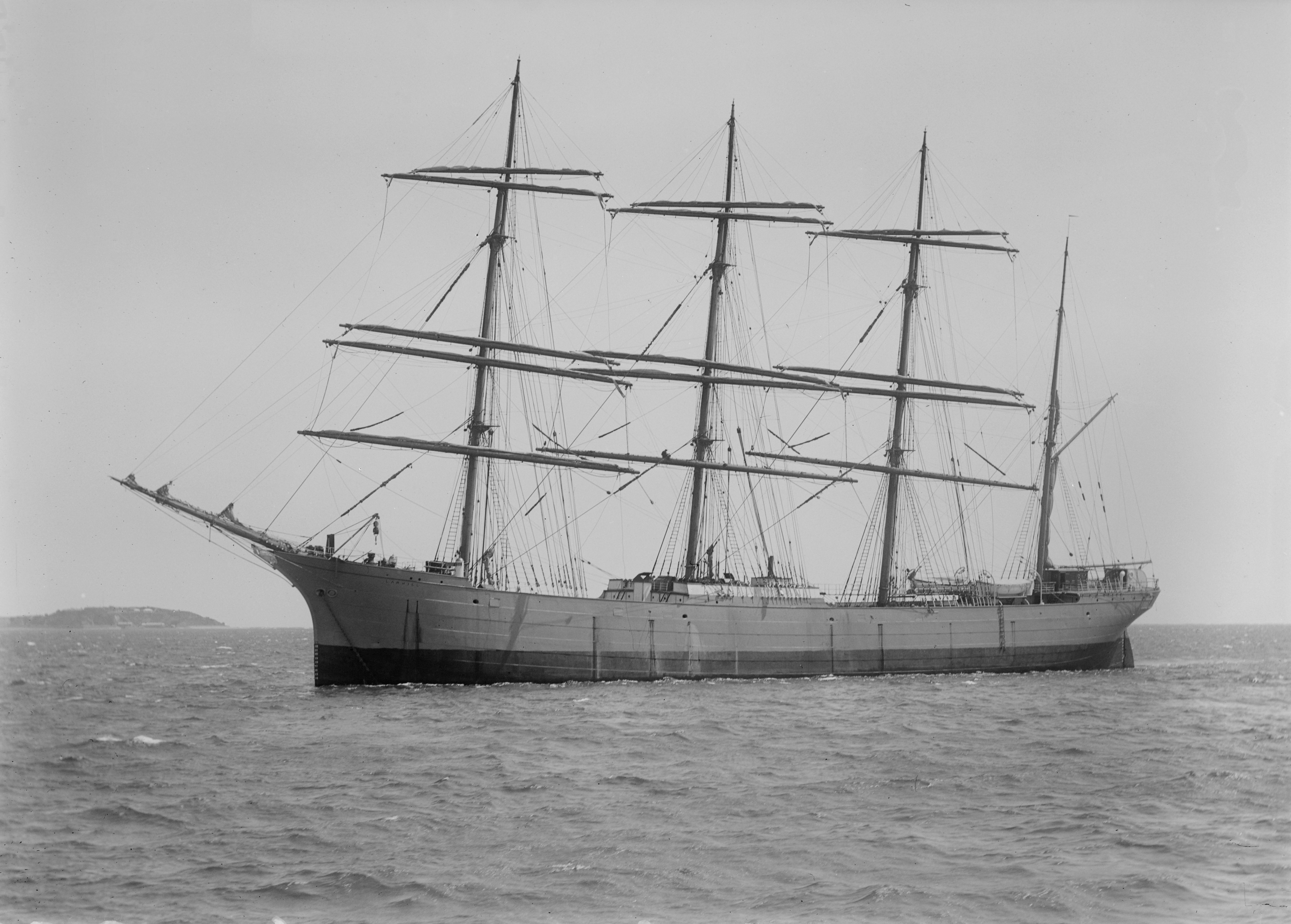

History
- Name: Lawhill
- Ordered: 1891
- Laid down: January 1892
- Launched: 24 August 1892
- Captured: by South Africa on August 21, 1941
- Fate: Broken up 1959

General characteristics
- Displacement: 6.400 ts
- Length: Total: 382 ft (116 m); Hull: 347 ft (106 m); On deck: 334 feet (102 m); Bp: 317.4 feet (96.7 m)
- Beam: 45 ft (14 m)
- Draught: 24.4 ft (7.4 m)
- Propulsion: Sail
- Sail plan: 27 (30) sails - 15 square sails, 1 spanker sail and 1 spanker topsail, 6 (9) stay sails and 4 foresails; Area: 43,060 square feet (4,000 m^{2})
- Speed: 17 knots (31 km/h)
- Complement: 25–30
- Notes: Rigging: four-masted steel barque rigged with double topgallant sails over double topsails and no royal sails, as a very special feature the topgallant masts attached aft of the topmast

Lawhill was a steel-hulled four-masted barque rigged in "jubilee" or "baldheaded" fashion, i.e. without royal sails over the top-gallant sails, active in the early part of the 20th century. Although her career was not especially remarkable, save perhaps for being consistently profitable as a cargo carrier, in the 1930s Richard Cookson went on board and extensively documented Lawhill's internals and construction, which was later published in the Anatomy of the Ship series.

== Construction ==
Lawhill was built at the Caledon Shipbuilding & Engineering Company yard of W. B. Thompson in Dundee, Scotland, and launched on 24 August 1892. And it was named after the Law, a hill in the middle of Dundee, Lawhill had been ordered by shipowner Charles Barrie for the jute trade, but only made two voyages carrying jute before the business became unprofitable, and shifted to other cargoes.

== Service ==
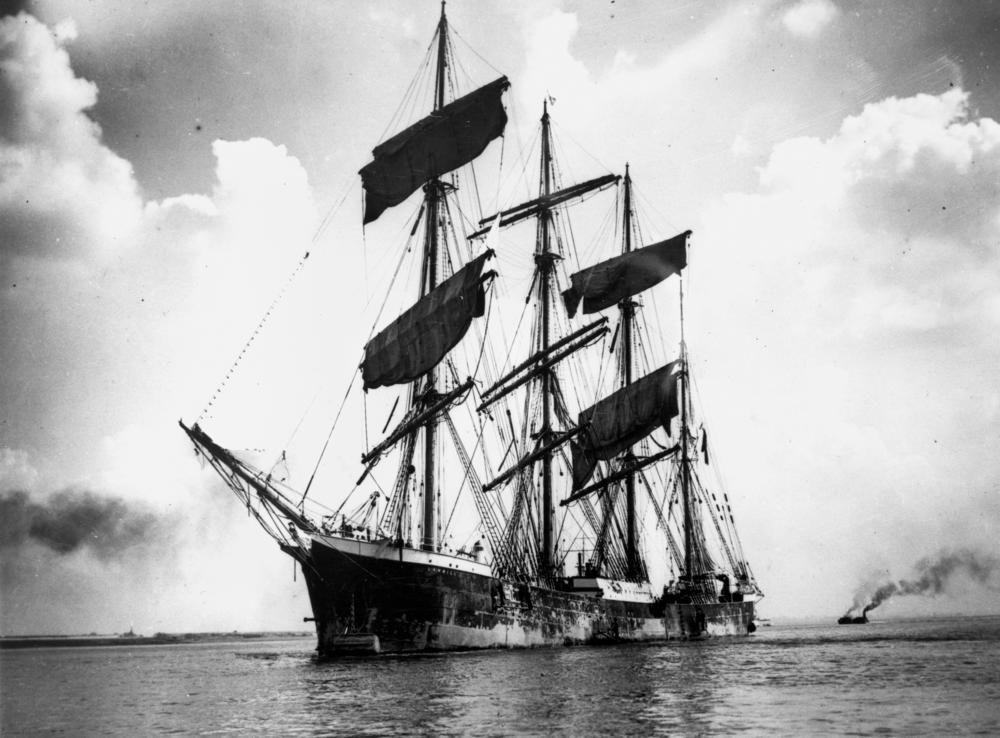
Lawhill at Gravesend in 1934

During the 1890s, a demand was developing for kerosene in the Far East, which could be more efficiently carried by sail at the time (the Falls of Clyde would take up this unusual trade several years later), and on August 31. 1899 Lawhill was sold to the Lawhill Sailing Ship Co. Ltd. (F. E. Bliss, manager), London, together with her sistership Juteopolis. Captain John C. B. Jarvis of Dundee, inventor of the eponymous brace winch, was given command of the ship (September 1, 1899 - January 21, 1911). In June 1900 the barque was transferred to the Anglo-American Oil Company. She made nine voyages carrying oil and other cargoes, then the development of storage tank capacity reduced demand, and Lawhill went, again together with her sistership Juteopolis, to Geo. Windram & Co. of Liverpool in 1911. Captain J. A. Sanders became her new master.

In the year 1914, she was sold to Finnish owner August Troberg under the command of Captain Edward August Jansson, and Lawhill became Finland's largest sailing ship. Despite the hazards of World War I, Lawhill continued to sail, managing to elude U-boats and arrive unescorted into Brest in May 1917, carrying wheat from Australia. However, French authorities refused to let Lawhill leave, citing the risks, and used her as a store ship. While in port, Lawhill was purchased by another Finn, Gustaf Erikson, but before she could get to sea, Finland became an ally of Germany, and in June 1918, the French government officially requisitioned Lawhill. The French started to convert Lawhill to a motor ship, but after much protest, Erikson finally got her back in January 1919, and, under the command of Captain Karl Reuben de Cloux, she resumed carrying wheat, first from Argentina, then from Australia again, as well as timber and other cargoes. The author Alan Villiers served on Lawhill, until injured off Port Lincoln in a fall from the yardarm in 1922.

On 1 October 1932, she rammed and sank Polish steamer SS Niemen (3.107 BRT) in Kattegat. As for the trial of Captain Arthur. A. Söderlund, the Lawhill master, he was found not guilty.

Richard Brinsley Sheridan graphically described his 10-months in the ship during her 1933-34 voyage to Australia, when he published his book Heavenly Hell: The Experiences of an Apprentice in a Four-Mast Barque.

After twenty years of steady service as a grain carrier, Lawhill was arrested on August 21, 1941, while in East London after a return from Australia and officially confiscated finally by the South African government in April 1942 (or September 22, 1942) as a prize of war, Finland having sided with the Axis. The ship was used by the South African Railways & Harbour Administration for cargo during the war, then sold to private citizens of South Africa (in 1946 to Lawhill (Pty) Ltd., East London and in 1947 to Thomas Worker and Herman Olthaver, Johannesburg, for the sum of £9,000), who used Lawhill on several voyages to Argentina with coal and returning with a cargo of wheat. In November 1947 she sailed from Lourenço Marques under the command of Captain Madry A. Lindholm to Port Victoria in ballast and returned to Beira, Mozambique, with a cargo of wheat. This was in fact her last long voyage at sea. Showing signs of deterioration, she was sold to Marcio da Silva Jr of Lourenço Marques and arrived there, after a short voyage of 500 nautical miles (930 km) from Beira, with great ceremony in September 1948. However, the necessary repairs were beyond the means of her new owners, and she was laid up in the Tembe River where she rotted at anchor for many years. After a last transfer to Joaquim Fernandes Coelho, the old ship was finally broken up for scrap sometime in the late 1950s.

Between 1940 and 1944, the donkeyman on the Lawhill was B.V. Linderman of Finland. During his time abroad the Lawhill under Captain Söderlund, Lindeman rounded Cape Horn three times under sail.

== See also ==
- Garthpool (barque)
