= Acielle =

Sailing ship wrecked in 1929 in Australia

Coordinates: 31.104078°S 153.024988°E

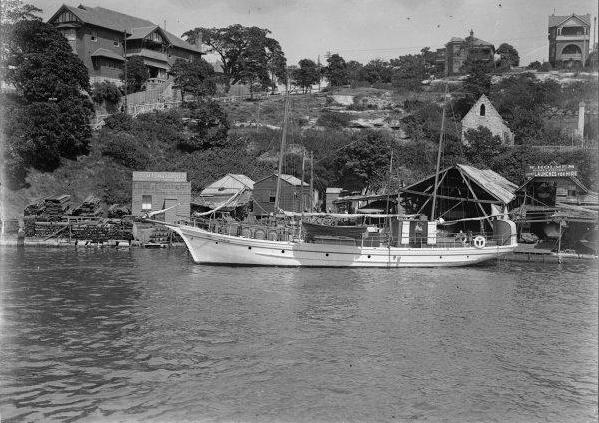
- The sailing ship Acielle at mooring in Sydney Harbour while owned by Mr. Lebbeus Hordern

History
- Name: Acielle
- Owner: Australian Iron & Steel Co
- Builder: Tasmania, Australia
- Completed: 1908
- Fate: Wrecked 11 September 1929

General characteristics
- Type: Wooden ketch
- Tonnage: 40 GRT
- Crew: 4

The Acielle was a 70-foot (21 m) wooden ketch that was wrecked 15 miles (24 km) south of Smoky Cape, New South Wales on 11 September 1929.

== Service history ==
The Acielle was launched in Tasmania, and sold to Mr Lebbeus Hordern of Sydney, who is credited with first having brought seaplanes to Australian waters. Hordern used the Acielle as a parent ship for his seaplane, and named her after his survey company, ACL (Aerial Company Limited). In 1921, Hordern purchased another four seaplanes, two Curtiss three-seater 'Seagull' flying boats, a ten-seater Short twin engined craft, and a Short sporting seaplane. With no expense spared, he equipped the Acielle and set out to complete the first aerial navigation of the entire Australian coastline, covering around 150 miles per day.

Eventually the Acielle was sold on again, and was next used as a pleasure yacht, then refitted by the Australian Iron and Steel Company for a trip to investigate iron ore deposits on the northwest coast of Australia.

=== Shipwreck event ===
It was during this expedition, two days out from Sydney en route to Derby, Western Australia, on 11 September 1929, that the Acielle foundered in a strong southeasterly gale. Her captain, Smith, and the crew of four endeavored to reach the shelter of Trial Bay, New South Wales, but the vessel was overwhelmed by the violent seas, and ran ashore 15 miles (24 km) south of Smoky Cape Lighthouse.

The vessel was valued at £2500 and was insured.

== Wreck site and wreckage ==
The Kempsey Heritage Inventory states that the ship's anchor at the Heritage Hotel of Gladstone, Kempsey, is believed to have come from the Acielle. The anchor is believed to have lain under the sand but was frequently exposed by sea movement. The anchor was dragged from the sand by a member of the Jordan family who is a fisherman at Hat Head. In 1974, it was transported to Gladstone Hotel (now renamed to the Heritage Hotel) and accepted by Jim Tedd, the then publican of Gladstone Hotel. It was placed in the garden of the hotel and remains there.
