= Tatoosh Islands (Alaska) =

The Tatoosh Islands are a small group of islands north of Ketchikan in Southeast Alaska. They are located at 55.521°N, 131.8429°W. They were named in 1886 by the US Coast and Geodetic Survey.
