= SS West Hika =

Cargo Ship

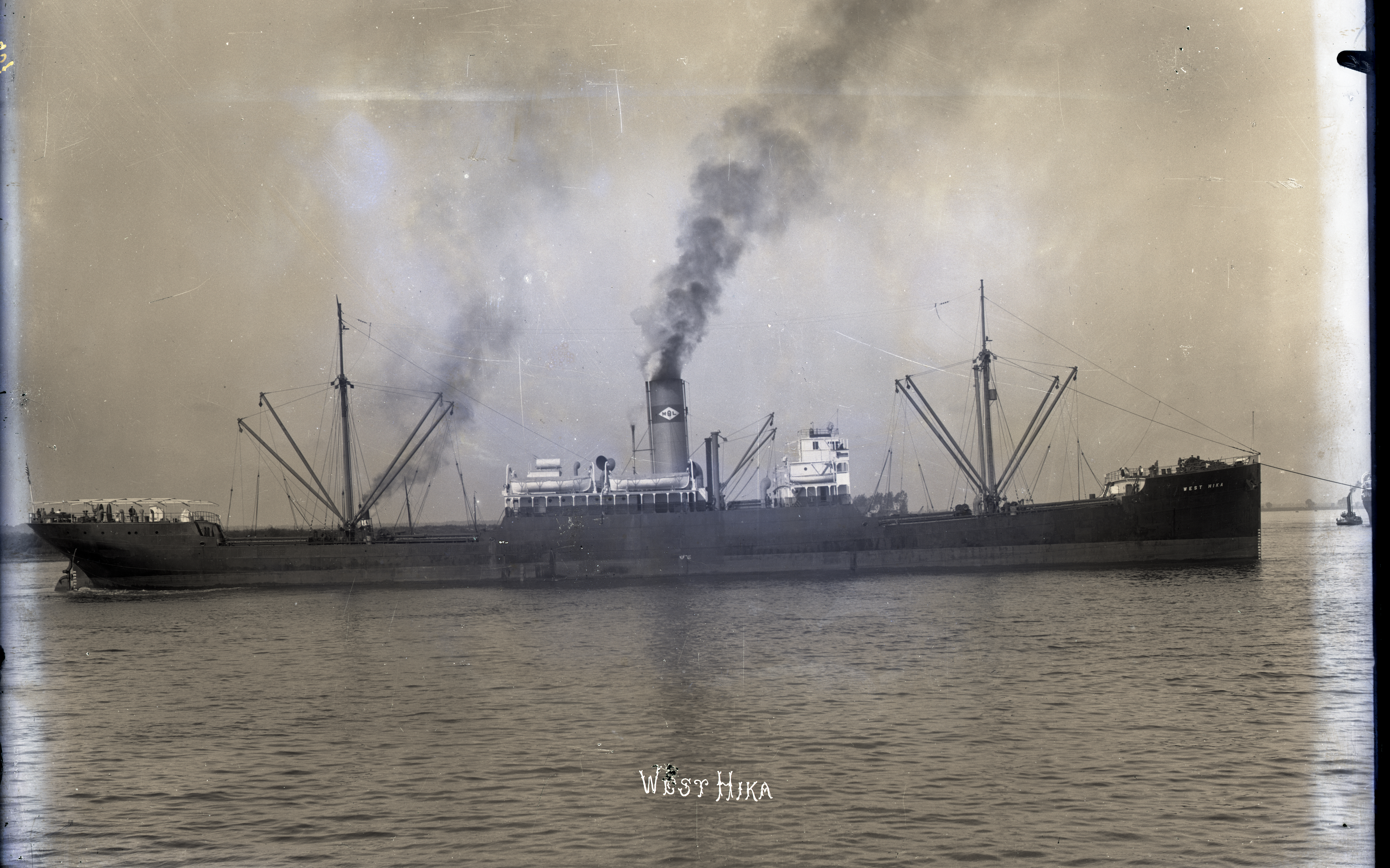
- West Hika

History

United States
- Name: West Hika
- Owner: USSB (1920-September 1931); Waterman Steamship Corporation (September 1931- February 1937)
- Operator: Los Angeles Pacific Navigation Company (1920-May 1921); North Atlantic and Western Steamship Company (June 1921-August 1922); Waterman Steamship Corporation (1925-1936)
- Builder: Los Angeles Shipbuilding & Dry Dock Co
- Yard number: 19
- Laid down: 4 November 1918
- Launched: 12 May 1919
- Sponsored by: Miss Susanne Valentine
- Commissioned: 20 February 1920
- Homeport: Los Angeles (1920-1931); Mobile (1932-1936)
- Identification: US official number 219523; code letters LVKS (1920–33); Call sign KOZK (1933–36)
- Fate: Wrecked, 14 January 1936

General characteristics
- Type: Design 1013 ship
- Tonnage: 5,372 GRT (1920-1931); 5,275 GRT (1932-1936); 3,351 NRT (1920-1931); 3,286 NRT (1920-1931); 8,374 DWT
- Length: 410 ft 0 in (124.97 m)
- Beam: 54 ft 4 in (16.56 m)
- Depth: 27 ft 2 in (8.28 m)
- Installed power: 3500 Ihp, 422 Nhp
- Propulsion: Los Angeles Shipbuilding & Dry Dock Co 3-cylinder triple expansion
- Speed: 10.5 knots
- Crew: 40

West Hika was a Design 1013 cargo ship built in 1919 by the Los Angeles Shipbuilding & Dry Dock Co of Los Angeles. She was one of many ships built by the company for the United States Shipping Board.

== Design and construction ==
The West ships were cargo ships of similar size and design built by several shipyards on the West Coast of the United States for the United States Shipping Board (USSB) for emergency use during World War I. Most were given names that began with the word West. The ship was laid down at Los Angeles Shipbuilding & Dry Dock Co shipyard (yard number 19, USSB hull number 1402), and launched at 20:40 on 12 May 1919. Miss Susanne Valentine, daughter of W. L. Valentine was sponsor for the ship. As built, the ship was 410 feet 0 inches (124.97 m) long (between perpendiculars) and 54 feet 0 inches (16.46 m) abeam, a mean draft of 23 feet 11 1/4 inches (7.296 m). West Hika was assessed at 5,940 GRT, 3,429 NRT and 8,374 DWT. The vessel had a steel hull, and a single 422 nhp triple-expansion steam engine that drove a single screw propeller, and moved the ship at up to 10.5 knots (12.1 mph; 19.4 km/h).

== Operational history ==
West Hika was launched on May 12, 1919, and delivered to the United States Shipping Board in January, 1920. Upon delivery, the vessel was allocated to Los Angeles Pacific Navigation Company, who along with four other ships put it on her routes to the Orient. The voyages were profitable initially, for example a February 1920 trip by West Hika netted $110,500, while in June 1920 the ship brought from Sumatra 7,576 cases of rubber for the Goodyear plant in Los Angeles worth about $750,000.

However, by early 1921 it became clear that with the tariffs imposed by the Shipping Board, it was impossible for American merchants to compete with the foreign companies. West Hika was the last ship of Los Angeles Pacific Navigation Company to sail to the Orient on February 21, 1921, with the cargo of cotton for Japan, livestock for Hawaii, and general merchandise for China. Following the discontinuation of Los Angeles-Orient routes, the ships of Los Angeles Pacific Navigation Company were turned over to the North Atlantic and Western Steamship Company of New York to operate on East coast-West coast routes. West Hika was the last one transferred due to her arrival from the Orient on June 6.

At the hearing on August 17, 1922, before the USSB the president of the North Atlantic and Western Steamship Company disclosed operational revenue for the company. From the numbers it appears, West Hika was used only on one trip eastbound, bringing in very modest revenue of $22,540.42. On August 15, 1922 West Hika was towed from Boston Harbor and sent to Norfolk. She arrived in Hampton Roads on August 18 to be laid up.

She was reactivated in 1925 and allocated to Waterman Steamship Corporation of Mobile, operating on Gulf to Europe routes. In 1925 she was operating between Gulf ports of Mobile, Biloxi, Tampa, Pensacola and London. In 1926 the service was expanded to include ports in the Netherlands and Germany.

West Hika was involved in several accidents and dangerous encounters. On February 25, 1929, she collided with German steamer Ida Blumenthal in the Scheldt. The German ship had to be beached at Walsoorden and was refloated the next day. On April 16, 1929, she was stuck with a broken rudder off the coast of Nantucket during a heavy gale storm, but managed to get through. She lost her rudder again on March 10, 1934, while on her way from Le Havre to Mobile, she sailed into a strong storm about 125 miles east-northeast of Ponta Delgada in Azores. She was saved by a steamer SS City of Omaha who towed her for almost 4,000 miles to New Orleans

On September 14, 1931 Waterman Steamship Corporation acquired several vessels that it was already operating including West Hika. She was bought for $75,366.00. On December 22, 1931, Waterman got approved for reconditioning loans from USSB for remodeling, improving and equipping four steamships that it acquired. All ships were assigned to Mobile Oceanic Line.

After completing the updates, the ship had been assessed 5,275 GRT and 3,286 NRT.

=== Sinking ===
On December 16, 1935 West Hika departed from Panama City and after a stopover in Mobile, she continued on to London and Newcastle with a load of general cargo and a deck load of timber. After reaching London and unloading some of her cargo, she continued to Newcastle on the evening of January 14, 1936. During her trip, she ran into fog and around 19:00 ran aground about 3 miles south of Seaham. Several attempts were made to refloat her, but they all failed. Some cargo was removed from the ship including the deck load and was taken to Newcastle in an attempt to lighten the ship. The bad weather arrived and several more attempts were made to refloat, but they all failed as well. At the end of February West Hika was sold to the South Stockton Shipbreaking Company. The cargo unloading and salvage work continued through the spring and summer of 1936, and finally on September 4, 1936, she was refloated and towed to Tees. In December 1936 West Hika was sold to Moller Line of Shanghai for about £11,000. In March 1937 she was sold again to Hughes, Bolckow, Blyth for breaking up for about £14,500. Finally, on 25 May 1937 West Hika was towed to Blyth where she was broken up on the same day.
