= SS Selje (1920) =

Norwegian cargo vessel

SS Selje was a Norwegian cargo ship on passage from Melbourne, Australia, to the United Kingdom with a cargo of grain when she collided with the steamship SS Kaituna soon after 11:00 pm on 29 March 1929. Kaituna hit her amidships and she sank 25 minutes later, 25 nautical miles (46 km; 29 mi) southwest of Cape Otway, Victoria, Australia. Kaituna had her bow badly battered.
