= East Carolina University Graduate School =

Graduate school in Greenville, North Carolina, U.S.

- Type: Public
- Established: 1929
- Dean: Kathleen Cox, Ph.D (interim)
- Students: 5,558
- Location: Greenville, North Carolina, U.S.
- Campus: Urban
- Colors: Purple and Gold
- Website: gradschool.ecu.edu

The East Carolina University Graduate School is the graduate school of East Carolina University in Greenville, North Carolina, United States. It coordinates the graduate offerings of all departments in the seven colleges, the Brody School of Medicine, and Integrated Coastal Sciences. The school offers Master of Arts (MA), Master of Science (MS), and Doctor of Philosophy (PhD) degrees in over 89 different fields.

== History ==
East Carolina University Board of Trustees first authorized a master's degree program on August 22, 1929. The degrees' were first awarded in 1933. From 1929 to 1941, the school focused on education degrees, and first offered a non-teaching master's of science degree in 1941.

In 1941, it was one of six accredited Graduate Schools in North Carolina and now offers over 69 master's degrees, 18 doctoral programs, and 89 certificates. The School oversees the graduate programs of the College of Allied Sciences, the Thomas Harriot College of Arts and Sciences, the College of Business, the College of Education, the College of Engineering & Technology, the College of Fine Arts & Communication, the College of Health and Human Performance, the College of Nursing, the Integrated Coastal Program, and runs the non-professional degrees of the Brody School of Medicine.

== Academic Programs ==
The Graduate School of East Carolina University offers more than 100 graduate programs through its colleges and programs, including:

- Accounting
- Anthropology
- Audiology
- Art
- Biology
- Biomedical Physics
- Business Administration
- Chemistry
- Communication
- Computer Science
- Criminal Justice
- English
- History
- Kinesiology
- Mathematics
- Music
- Nutrition
- Occupational Therapy
- Physical Therapy
- Physics
- Public Health
- Sociology

The Graduate School also runs the PhD program of the Integrated Coastal Program and most certificates for the University. Certain programs are offered through online learning, while others are only offered on-campus. The Graduate School offers over 89 certificates across all 7 colleges and the Brody School of Medicine. Most graduate certificates are entirely online, with only 13 offered entirely in person.

The Graduate School also offers advanced and professional degrees in education including in Educational Leadership (Ed.D.) and Educational Administration and Supervision (Ed. S.). It also oversees the Doctor of Physical Therapy (DPT), the Doctor of Audiology (AuD), the Master of Science in Nursing (MSN), the Doctor of Nursing Practice (DNP), and the Doctor of Philosophy in Nursing (PhD) programs.

== Student body ==
As of Fall 2021, there were 5,558 graduate students, of which 550 were in the medical and dental schools. 66% of graduate's were female, 26.6% belong to underrepresented minority groups, and 1.3% are international students. Of all graduate students, 24% of students pursue degrees in healthcare, 21% in business, and 15% in education. In the 2019-2020 academic year, 65.3% of graduates took all classes online, 20.3% took no classes online, and 14.4% took classes in a hybrid setting.

== Accreditation ==
East Carolina University Graduate School is accredited by the Southern Association of Colleges and Schools to award Baccalaureate, Master's, and Doctoral degrees.
