= List of chancellors of East Carolina University =

Twelve men have been the president or chancellor at East Carolina University. In 1972, ECU joined the UNC system, which changed the name of the chief administrator at East Carolina. The chancellor is chosen by the UNC board of governors on the recommendation of the UNC BOG president. Above the chancellor is the board of trustees. Four of the twelve trustees are picked by the governor of North Carolina. The student body president sits on the board ex officio.

== Presidents of East Carolina University ==
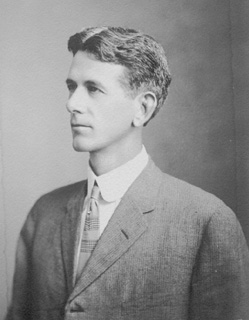
Robert Herring Wright

#	Name	Term begin	Term end	Notes	References
1	Robert Herring Wright	1909	1934		
2	Leon Renfroe Meadows	1934	1944		
3	Howard Justus McGinnis	1944	1946	Interim	
4	Dennis Hargrove Cooke	1946	1947		
5	John Decatur Messick	1947	1959		
6	Leo Warren Jenkins	1960	1972		

== Chancellors of East Carolina University ==
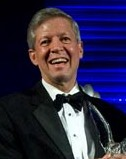
Steven Ballard

#	Name	Term begin	Term end	Notes	References
1	Leo Warren Jenkins	1972	1978		
2	Thomas Bowman Brewer	1978	1981		
3	John McDade Howell	1982	1988		
4	Richard R. Eakin	1988	2001		
5	William Muse	2001	2003		
6	William E. Shelton	2003	2004	Interim	
7	Steven Ballard	2004	2016		
8	Cecil Staton	2016	2019		
9	Daniel Gerlach	2019	2019	Interim	
10	Ron Mitchelson	2019	2021	Interim	
11	Philip Rogers	2021	-		

== Timeline ==
Presidents and chancellors of East Carolina University
