= List of East Carolina University buildings =

== Main campus ==
=== Academic buildings ===
Building	Image	Constructed	Notes	Reference
A. J. Fletcher Music Center		1966	School of Music and Music Library	
Harold H. Bate Building		1988	College of Business, Thomas Harriot College of Arts and Sciences, Department of Business Education, BB&T Center for Leadership Development, and the Honors Program	
Brewster Building		1970	Departments of History, Geography, Political Science, Sociology, and Economics	
Austin Building		1964	Department of Mathematics	
Carol Belk Building		1972	College of Health and Human Performance	
Belk Annex 1			Department of Recreation and Leisure Studies	
Christenbury Memorial Gymnasium		1952	Department of Health Education and Promotion	
Eller House		1925	Graduate Program in Maritime History and Nautical Archaeology	
Erwin Building		1952	College of Fine Arts and Communication	
Family Therapy Clinic				
Flanagan Building		1939	Departments of Anthropology, Geology and Science and Math Education, and the Institute for Coastal and Marine Resources	
Graham Building		1929	Department of Geological Sciences	
Howell Science Complex		1969	Departments of Physics and Biology	
Jenkins Fine Arts Center		1973-1977	School of Art and Design and the Wellington B. Gray Art Gallery	
Joyner East			Department of Library Science and Instructional Technology, School of Communications	
J.Y. Joyner Library		1954		
Mamie E. Jenkins Building		1909	Academic offices	
Maritime Conservation Lab				
McGinnis Theatre		1951	School of Theater and Dance	
Minges Coliseum		1966	College of Health and Human Performance	
Mendenhall Student Center		1974	Student Activities Center	
Messick Theatre Arts Centre		1927	Department of Theatre Arts	
Old Cafeteria Complex		1909	Volunteer and Service-Learning Center, 1 Card, Academic Advising and Support Center, and the Office of Student Financial Aid	
Ragsdale Hall		1923	Graduate School	
Rawl Building		1959	Departments of Construction Management, Military Affairs, Psychology	
Rawl Annex		1960	College of Technology and Computer Science Advising Center	
Rivers Building		1968	College of Human Ecology	
Science and Technology Building		2009	College of Technology and Computer Science and the Department of Chemistry	
Speight Building		1965	College of Education	
Whichard Building		1923	College of Fine Arts and Communication	
Whichard Building Annex		1959		
Wright Auditorium		1925		

=== Administrative buildings ===
Building	Image	Constructed	Notes	Reference
Administrative Support Annex		1952	Payroll department	
Blount House		1945	ECU Police department	
Bloxton House		1952	Ledonia Wright African-American Culture Center	
Building 43			Mail Services	
Building 123		1969	Children's Development Services Agency	
Building 127		1970	Human Resources	
Building 141		1970	Materials Management	
Building 158		1940	University Advancement's Special Events office	
Building 159		1973	College of Education Center for Science, Math, and Technology Education	
Building 165		1955		
Building 172		1967	Moving Services	
Building 189			Fitness, Instruction, Testing, and Training Facility	
Building 198 - Blair Building		1977	University Marketing and University Publications	
Building 215c		1998	Central Stores and Receiving	
Career Services		1935		
The Center for Professional Development		1964		
Chancellor's Residence		1920		
Cotanche Building		1955	Information Technology and Computing Services	
Environmental Health and Safety Building		1985	Office of Environmental Health and Safety	
Facilities Administration		1951		
Facilities Administration Annex		1957		
Facilities Grounds Services				
Facilities Services - Eppes Complex			Facilities Services Center	
Facilities Services Steam Plant		1967		
Facilities Warehouse		2001		
Financial Services Building		1977		
Greenville Centre		1991	Division of University Advancement	
Harris Building		1997	University Printing and Graphics	
Howard House		1923	News and Communication Services	
International House			Office of International Affairs	
Malene G. Irons Building		1969-1970	Family Support Network of ENC, the Developmental Evaluation Clinic (DEC), and Revolving Education Around Partnerships (REAP)	
Parking and Transportation Services		1977		
Self-Help Building		1910	Student Media	
Slay Hall		1949	Disability Support Services	
Spilman Building		1930	Chancellor's Office, and the Divisions of Academic and Student Affairs	
Student Health Building		1930	Student Health Center	
Taylor-Slaughter Alumni Center		1942	Alumni Relations & Institutional Advancement	
Ward Guest House		1931		
Whichard Building		1923	Office of Undergraduate Admissions and the Office of the Registrar	
Whichard Building Annex		1923	Office of Undergraduate Admissions and the Office of the Registrar	
Willis Building		1974	Regional Development Institute	

=== Athletic buildings ===
Building	Image	Constructed	Notes	Reference
Athletic Grounds Storage				
Blount Recreational Sports Complex		1998		
Clark-LeClair Stadium		2004		
Dowdy–Ficklen Stadium		1962-1963		
Student Recreation Center		1994		
Minges Coliseum		1966		
Murphy Center		2002	A 52,475-square-foot (4,875.1 m^{2}) building that houses the strength and conditioning facilities, banquet rooms, sport memorabilia, and an academic enhancement center	
NRC Field House		2008	A 5,384-square-foot (500.2 m^{2}) building that houses equipment storage, restrooms, and has a covered seating area	
Pirate Club Building		1965	Athletic Ticket Office	
Scales Field House		1966	Coaches offices	
Ward Sports Medicine Building		1989	Administrative offices for ECU athletics	

=== Dining Halls ===
Building	Image	Constructed	Notes	Reference
Center Court		1994	Located within Student Recreation Center	
Todd Dining Hall		1994		
West End Dining Hall		2005		

=== Residence Hall ===
Building	Image	Constructed	Notes	Reference
Belk Residence Hall (demolished in 2013)		1966		
Clement Residence Hall		1969		
College Hill Suites		2006		
Cotten Residence Hall		1925		
Fleming Residence Hall		1922-1923		
Fletcher Residence Hall		1963		
Garrett Residence Hall		1956		
Gateway East and West		2015		
Greene Residence Hall		1966		
Jarvis Residence Hall		1908-1909		
Jones Residence Hall		1959		
Legacy Residence Hall		1960		
Scott Residence Hall		1962		
Tyler Residence Hall		1969		
Umstead Residence Hall		1955		
White Residence Hall		1968		

== Health sciences campus buildings ==
Building	Image	Constructed	Notes	Reference
Biotechnology Building		1988	Pediatric Outpatient Center	
Brody Medical Sciences Building		1979 - 1981	Brody School of Medicine, Brody Outpatient Center and Brody Auditorium	
Doctors Park			Psychiatric Services, Adult and Pediatric Health Care, Infectious Diseases/International Travelers Clinic	
ECU Gastroenterology				
ECU Pediatric Specialty Care			Pediatric cardiology, diabetes and endorcrinology, nephrology, pulmonary care, weight management and nutrition, and the Center for Children with Chronic and Complex Conditions.	
ECU Plastic and Reconstructive Surgery		1999		
ECU Women's Physicians			Department of Obstetrics and Gynecology	
East Carolina Heart Institute at East Carolina University		2009 - 2008	The outpatient center and primary teaching and research location for cardiovascular care	
Eastern Carolina Family Medicine Center				
Facilities Services Utility Plant				
Health Sciences Building		2004-2006	Houses the College of Nursing, College of Allied Health Sciences and Laupus Health Sciences Library	
Lakeside Annex Modular 1—Administrative Support			Office and laboratory space for the Health Science Campus	
Lakeside Annex Modular 3—News and Information			Health Sciences News and Information offices	
Lakeside Annex Modular 4—Diabetes Research				
Lakeside Annex Modular 5—Family Medicine Research				
Lakeside Annex Modular 7—Clinical Skills Assessment/Education				
Leo W. Jenkins Cancer Center				
Hardy Building			Department of Public Health	
Magnetic Resonance Imaging and Gamma Knife		2005		
Health Sciences Alumni and Development			Medical and Health Sciences Foundation	
Medical Pavilion		1961	Health Information Services; Personal Counseling Center; Department of Medicine	
Monroe Center/EAHEC/Venture Tower			Eastern Carolina Injury Prevention Program	
Moye Medical Center		2007	ECU Physicians building housing Cardiology, General Internal Medicine and Pulmonary and Critical Care	
Nephrology/Dialysis Center			Dialysis Center; Departments of Nephrology and Hypertension	
Physicians Quadrangle - ECU Geriatric Center		1966	Geriatric Center	
Physicians Quadrangle - EMS Division, Building M		1993		
Physicians Quadrangle—Health Services Research and Development		1973		
Rehabilitation Physicians Clinic				
Edward N. Warren Life Sciences Building		1999	Named for Greenville State Senator, Edward Nelson Warren, in October 1999	

== West Research campus buildings ==
Building	Image	Constructed	Notes	Reference
Coastal Studies Annex		1961		
West Academic Building		1961	Houses the NC Agromedicine Institute and the Queen Anne's Revenge conservation project	

== Razed buildings ==
Building	Image	Constructed	Razed	Notes	Reference
Original Austin Building		1908-1909	1968		
College Stadium		1949	1962	Home of the original football stadium	
Old Croatan		1970	2009	Replaced by the current Croatan	
Flanagan Sylvan Theatre		1956	2004	An open-air amphitheater located formerly where the current West End Dining Hall	
Garrett House		late 1940s	1996		
Model School		1914	1927		
Wilson Pergola		1926	1968		
Y-Hut		1925	1952		

== Ledyard E. Ross Hall ==
Ledyard E. Ross Hall is a building on the East Carolina University campus at MacGregor Downs Road in Greenville, North Carolina in the United States, adjacent to the ECU Health Sciences Building. The facility was named after Ledyard E. Ross, a class of 1951 ECU graduate and notable Greenville orthodontist. The 188,000 square feet (17,500 m^{2}) building officially opened October 12, 2012, and is home to East Carolina University School of Dental Medicine. Until its opening, the School of Dental Medicine’s students shared their learning space at the Brody Medical Sciences Building. In 2016, East Carolina opened the ECU School of Dental Medicine Research Center on the fourth floor of Ross Hall, adding almost 15,000 square feet (1,400 m^{2}) of laboratory and laboratory support space.

=== Research and education ===
While Ross Hall primarily serves as an educational institution, it also aims to provide reduced-fee dental care to low-income patients. The school houses specialty suite for orthodontics, pediatric dentistry, a clinical research area, and arrangements for patients with special needs. In June 2012, Ross Hall opened its first of ten planned community service learning centers with the intentions of reaching rural or under served communities. As of 2016, Ross Hall has opened eight of these centers focused on research on health disparities, with the future goals of broadening its research into the concentrations of biomaterials, bioengineering, and the oral impacts of chronic diseases like diabetes and obesity.

=== Technology ===
East Carolina University’s School of Dental Medicine at Ross Hall was named an Apple Distinguished Program by Apple Inc. for its implementation of advanced technologies for student education and teledentistry. Ross Hall possesses 133 operatories, or "smart classroom" learning halls, seminar rooms, faculty offices, and a simulation suite, in which attending dental students can gain hands-on practice in dentistry.

== Under construction buildings ==
Building	Image	Constructed	Notes	Reference
East Endzone		2010	A 7,000 addition to Dowdy–Ficklen Stadium	
Family Medicine Center		2010	A 117,185 square feet (10,886.8 m^{2}) building to house the Department of Family Medicine and Geriatrics Center	
Croatan		2011	LEED certified that will contain a Chick-fil-A and Chili's Too	
Moye Medical II		2010		
Olympic Sports Support Building		2010	20,000 square feet for coaches offices, meeting, locker, equipment rooms and sports medicine	
Soccer Stadium		2010	1,000-seat facility with pressbox	
Softball Stadium		2010	1,000-seat facility with pressbox	
Track & Field Facility		2010	Stand alone eight-lane polyurethane track with field event competition area	
