= John McDade Howell =

American university chancellor

John McDade Howell (January 28, 1922 – January 3, 2016) was the seventh chancellor of East Carolina University. He was born in Five Points, Alabama. In 1942, he joined the US Army Air Corps and served for three years in the European Theater, which he received a Bronze Star. After he was honorably discharged he enrolled at the University of Alabama, earning a bachelor's degree in journalism in 1948 and a master's degree in political science the following year. He graduated Phi Beta Kappa. In 1954 Howell earned his doctorate in political science from Duke University. He then joined the faculty as an associate professor of political science at Memphis State University. He then moved to Greenville, North Carolina, and joined ECU faculty in 1957 and was promoted to full professor in 1961. He then assumed many roles, including founder and first chair of the political science department. Then he was the dean of the College of Arts and Sciences and then the dean of the Graduate School. He became vice chancellor for academic affairs in 1973 and served in that position until 1979. Returning to the classroom for a three-year period (1979–1982), he assumed the position of chancellor in 1982. Mr. and Mrs. Howell both served until his retirement from the chancellorship in 1987 when he was named chancellor emeritus. Howell died on January 3, 2016.
