= History of East Carolina University =

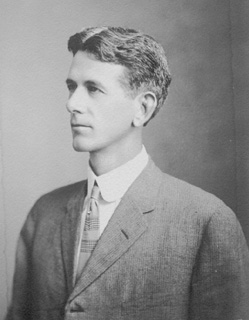
1st President of what is now ECU, Robert Herring Wright

East Carolina University can trace its roots to 1901 when City of Wilson citizens went to Raleigh to petition the N.C. General Assembly for an Eastern North Carolina Normal College. The delegation wanted the Normal College in Wilson. The request was denied because the politicians did not want to take money away from the State Normal College.

In February 1905, Elizabeth City sent 11 citizens to persuade the General Assembly to charter a State Normal School for Eastern North Carolina. That delegation failed as well. Finally on March 8, 1907, at the urging of State Senator James Leonidas Fleming, the General Assembly passed an act titled: "AN ACT TO STIMULATE HIGH SCHOOL INSTRUCTION IN THE PUBLIC SCHOOLS OF THE STATE AND TEACHER TRAINING". In this act it said, "That there shall be established and maintained at some suitable point in eastern North Carolina a teachers' training school for the training of young white men and women under the corporate name of the East Carolina Teachers' Training School." $15,000 was appropriated to the fund to build the school, and $5,000 annually to fund the school. The Board of Trustees was selected on March 15, 1907 and Thomas Jordan Jarvis was chosen as the Chairman.

== Location ==
Eight eastern North Carolina towns and cities placed bids on the location of the school. The towns and cities and what they offered is as follows:

- Washington — $75,000 and the choice of two sites, 200 acres (0.81 km^{2}) or 133 acres (0.54 km^{2});
- Elizabeth City — $62,500 and 25 acres (100,000 m^{2});
- Kinston — $25,000 in secured bonds, free water and electricity for 10 years, 87 acres (350,000 m^{2}) and the Rhodes Military School;
- New Bern — $25,000 and 25 acres (100,000 m^{2});
- Rocky Mount — $25,000 and 40 acres (160,000 m^{2});
- Tarboro — $30,000, free utilities for 10 years and choice of two sites, 40 acres (160,000 m^{2}) or 25 acres (100,000 m^{2});
- Edenton — $25,000 and 35 acres (140,000 m^{2})
- Greenville — $100,000 less the cost of land and bond election expenses.

When Greenville put a bond to the city and County of Pitt, Haywood Dail promised Thomas Jarvis that Greenville would pass the bond. Dail wanted the ballots to be small and have only "For Bond Issue" and "Against Bond Issue" written on them. Dail then went on to chew the "Against Bond Issue" to ensure that the bond will pass. The vote passed by 352. The State Board of Education toured all eight cities in the month of June. On June 10, 1907 the SBE voted on the location of the school. On the first vote, Kinston received three votes, Rocky Mount received two votes and Greenville received one vote. On the second vote, all three locations received two votes. On the last and final vote, Greenville received four votes to Kinston two votes. One of the jobs the Board of Trustees did was to choose the President of the School. Robert Herring Wright was selected on June 11, 1907. He immediately set out to recruit faculty. ECTTS had 10 faculty members when the school opened its doors. On October 5, 1909, Pattie Simmons Dowell was the first student to enroll to the Training School.

== 1909-1921 ==
Aerial View of East Carolina Teachers Training School (ECTTS)

When classes started in 1909, ECTTS has six buildings. These buildings included two dormitories: Jarvis and Wilson, Administration Building, Power Plant, Infirmary, and Refectory (Dining Hall). Tuition was free for all students who pledged to teach for two years, and $45.00 for all other students. In total, 104 women and 19 men accompanied the 11

ECTTS Logo

faculty on the first day of classes. The School became a two-year Teacher Training School. The first vote by the students was to choose the school colors; Old Gold and Royal Purple won. June 11, 1911, 16 students became the first graduating class as East Carolina. In 1912, the Athletic League was formed. The three sports played were basketball, tennis and cross-country walking. This was the beginning of the Athletic Department. A Constitution was written for the first Student Self-Government Association. After growing expediently the School decided to change its name and mission. Mattie Virginia Cox Thornton was the very first student in line at East Carolina University in 1908. She rode a wagon pulled by a mule down dirt roads from Kinston to Greenville to be the first to enroll. Mrs. Thornton went on to become a teacher for many years.

== East Carolina Teacher's College ==
In December 1921, East Carolina Teachers Training School changed their name to "East Carolina Teachers College." This name change was to reflect how East Carolina had become a four-year degree-granting college, devoted to teacher education.
