= Dowdy–Ficklen Stadium =

On-campus football facility at East Carolina University

Bagwell Field at Dowdy–Ficklen Stadium
- "Rowdy Dowdy"
- Dowdy-Ficklen Stadium in 2009

- Location in North Carolina Location in the United States
- Full name: Dowdy–Ficklen Stadium
- Former names: Ficklen Memorial Stadium (1963–1994)
- Location: 100 Ficklen Dr, Greenville, North Carolina 27858
- Coordinates: 35°35′47″N 77°21′55″W
- Owner: East Carolina University
- Operator: East Carolina University
- Capacity: 51,000
- Surface: Tifton 419 Hybrid Bermuda

Construction
- Groundbreaking: 1962
- Built: 1962-1963
- Opened: September 21, 1963
- Renovated: 1991 - $1.6 million in repairs and renovations, 2002, 2009-2010, 2018-2019 ($60MM)
- Expanded: 1967–1968 - increased seating capacity to 20,000; 1977–1978 - increased seating capacity to 35,000; 1996–1998 - increased seating capacity to 43,000; 2010 - increased seating capacity to 50,000; 2019 - increased seating capacity to 51,000
- Cost: $283,387 ($2,234,553.41 in 2016 dollars)
- Architects: Dudley & Shoe Walter, Robbs, Callahan & Pierce, 1996-1998 expansion Corley, Redfoot, Zack, Inc.,(now CRA Associates, Inc.), 2010 expansion LS3P Associates, Ltd., 2019 expansion

Tenant
- East Carolina Pirates (NCAA) (1963–present)

Dowdy–Ficklen Stadium is the on-campus football facility at East Carolina University for the East Carolina Pirates in Greenville, North Carolina. The official capacity of the stadium is 51,000. The record attendance for the stadium was on September 3, 2022, against North Carolina State University with 51,711 in attendance. The stadium is also the site of Spring Commencement exercises for the university. The field itself was commemorated as Bagwell Field in 1997.

== History ==
=== Original construction ===
The initiative to build a new stadium was announced on October 7, 1961. On that day, President Leo Jenkins announced to a meeting of boosters, that a new stadium will be built to replace College Stadium. By 1962, over $280,000 was raised and Ficklen Memorial Stadium was built. The stadium was named for James Skinner Ficklen, the owner of Greenville's E.B. Skinner Tobacco Company. Skinner was a booster of the college, and established a scholarship fund in his name. The original stadium included permanent stands on the south side, a press box, and a lighting system. Ficklen Memorial Stadium opened on September 21, 1963 with a win against Wake Forest. The original seating capacity was 10,000.

=== Early expansions ===
The north side permanent seating was constructed in 1967 and 1968, increasing the capacity of the stadium to 20,000. The seats were designed by W.M. Freeman Associates from High Point. The exterior of the stadium was painted in 1970 by F.A. Miller Company. The lighting system was the next item that changed. The original lighting system was replaced with six towers outside of the stadium in 1975. The cost of the new lighting system was $450,000. L.E. Wooten company built the lighting system.

The next addition occurred two years later. The university added seats to the four corners increased the seating capacity to 35,000. This addition made Ficklen Memorial Stadium the third largest stadium in North Carolina. The expansion was funded by a $2.5 million drive in the spring of 1977. A three-story press box was built as part of this expansion. The press box, which had space for 92 writers and an entire floor for electronic media, was in use until 2018 when it was replaced by the much larger Townbank Tower. Lastly, scoreboard with a lightbank message center was placed on the east end of the stadium. The playing surface was redone in 1983. A new drainage system, new base of gravel and sand, new treated topsoil, and a new grass—Tifton 419 Hybrid Bermuda were all installed. A new sound system was built in 1988.

=== 1990s expansions ===
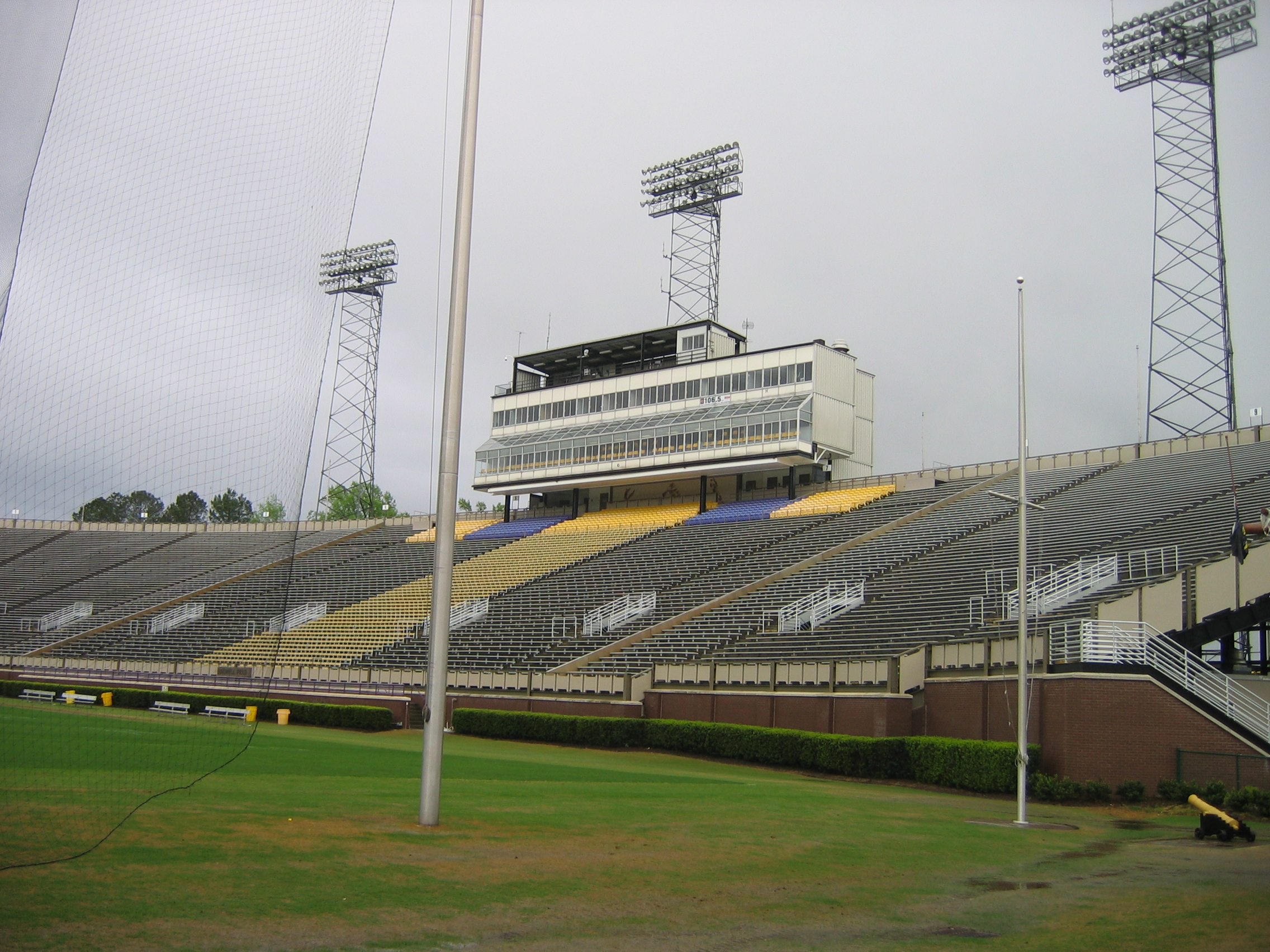
Dowdy–Ficklen press box side in 2008

In 1991, $1.6 million in renovations and repairs were accomplished on the stadium.

Ronald and Mary Ellen Dowdy of Orlando, Florida, donated $1 million during a fund-raising drive in 1994. Because of this donation, Ficklen Memorial Stadium was renamed Dowdy–Ficklen Stadium. Also that year the roads were improved around the stadium. Three years later, Al and Debbie Bagwell of Lake Gaston, Virginia donated to the East Carolina Educational Foundation. Because of this donation, the field inside the stadium was named Bagwell Field.

The upper deck on the north side was completed in 1998. It increased the capacity to 40,000. This was the first seating capacity increase since 1977. A year later the club level on the north side was completed. It added 3,000 seats to the total capacity. During the expansion of the upper deck and club level, the press box received improvements. In 1999, a $2 million scoreboard was built in the east endzone. Also that year a Pirate sculpture was dedicated in the southeast area of the stadium. The three-ton bronze sculpture is over 20 feet (6.1 m) tall. Irwin Belk gave the sculpture to the school. Jodi Hollnagel, a faculty member of the School of Art created the sculpture.

=== Murphy Center construction ===
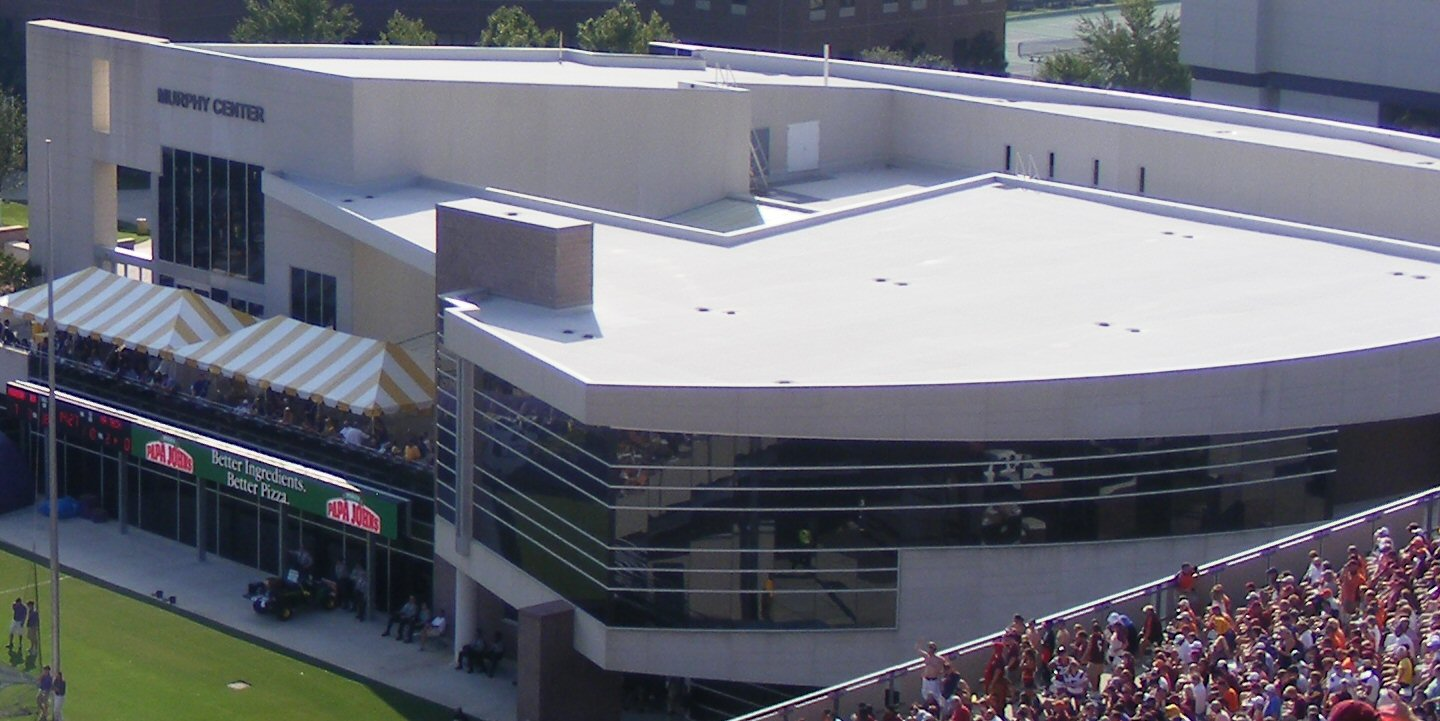
The Murphy Center in the west endzone.

The $13 million Murphy Center was dedicated on September 13, 2002. It was built in the west endzone of the stadium. It connects the stadium to Williams Arena at Minges Coliseum. The 52,475-square-foot (4,875.1 m^{2}) strength and conditioning, banquet rooms, sport memorabilia, and an academic enhancement center building was named for Pete and Lynn Murphy of Rose Hill.

=== 2009–2010 expansion ===
The next expansion began in December 2009. The expansion included removing the scoreboard located in the east end zone. 7,000 seats were built in its place. The seats connect the north and south sides in a horseshoe pattern. Those seats increased the capacity to 50,000. Restroom and concession stands were built under the new section. Above the east end zone, a new scoreboard was built. The HD scoreboard is 88 feet (27 m) wide and a little over 28 feet (8.5 m) tall. The LED portion is 84 feet (26 m) wide. This makes the new scoreboard the 22nd largest scoreboard in NCAA Football Bowl Subdivision. On the north and south sides of the stadium, 10,200 chair-back seats were installed. Lastly, another scoreboard was built on the west end zone in front of the Murphy Center. The total cost of the expansion was $20 million.

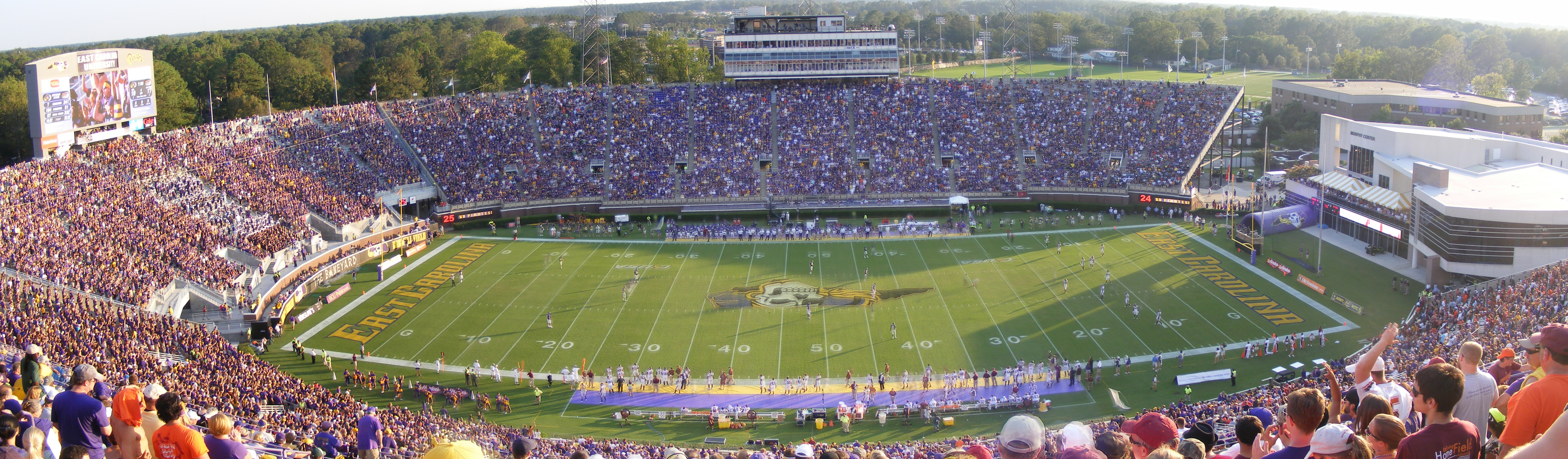
Dowdy–Ficklen in 2011

=== 2018–2019 renovation project ===
In May 2016, East Carolina revealed a $60 million renovation project for Dowdy–Ficklen Stadium, which is a portion of its athletic facilities master plan.

The project, which is slated to begin construction after the 2017 football season and was to be completed in time for the 2018 football season, has been extended to a 16-18 month construction period. In April 2019, TowneBank donated $3 million toward the renovation for naming rights. The renovation includes:

- A four-story tower above the south general admission seats which will add than 1,000 premium seats through the addition of a new Club Level, Loge Boxes, and Suites.
- A new field-level Club Section at the Murphy Center
- A modern press box with additional space for media, including amended radio and television broadcast and production locations.
- Improvements to the Ward Sports Medicine Building and Scales Field House to provide needed functional space for student-athletes.

TowneBank Tower officially opened in August 2019 and includes 19 skyboxes, four founder suites, 22 loge boxes, 530 club seats, and more than 100 media seats. The expansion led to a total capacity of 51,000 due to the large Pirate Club area behind the club seating.

== Marshall University plane crash ==
On November 14, 1970, the visiting Marshall University Thundering Herd lost a game 17-14 to the Pirates at Ficklen Stadium, which ended with Marshall quarterback Ted Shoebridge controversially being called for intentional grounding on the last play of the game. Later that evening, while on approach to Huntington Tri-State Airport, the Marshall football team's plane, which had been chartered to transport the Thundering Herd to and from Greenville, crashed, killing all 75 people on board.

On December 11, 2006, a plaque was erected at the visitors' entrance to Dowdy–Ficklen Stadium. It depicts the memorial fountain on the Marshall University campus.

== Attendance ==
=== List of average attendance ===
Year	Total attendance	Average attendance	Rank	Reference
2025	222,581	37,097	61	
2024	224,415	37,403	62	
2023	210,690	35,115	51	
2022	289,606	41,372	54	
2021	216,355	36,059	58	
2020	10,805	2,701	NA	
2019	198,717	33,119	70	
2018	230,356	32,908	65	
2017	257,090	36,727	61	
2016	264,680	44,113	55	
2015	259,645	43,274	60	
2014	268,713	44,786	58	
2013	263,910	43,985	54	
2012	282,076	47,013	45	
2011	300,069	50,012	40	
2010	297,987	49,665	44	
2009	292,191	41,742	57	
2008	210,080	42,016	56	
2007	249,219	41,537	56	
2006	223,006	37,168	63	
2005	165,230	33,046	70	
2004	153,418	30,684	71	
2003	198,073	33,012	68	
2002	148,144	29,629	67	
2001	186,875	37,375	58	
2000	217,742	36,290	61	
1999	294,255	42,036	49	
1998	158,716	31,743	64	
1997	164,375	32,875	-	
1996	146,324	29,265	-	
1995	151,889	30,378	-	
1994	159,805	31,961	-	
1993	134,482	26,896	-	
1992	164,068	32,814	-	
1991	160,108	32,022	-	
1990	143,285	28,657	-	

=== Top 15 attended games ===
	Attendance	Opponent	Date	Score	Reference
1	51,711	NC State	September 3, 2022	L, 21-20	
2	51,082	North Carolina	September 20, 2014	W, 70-41	
3	50,719	NC State	September 10, 2016	W, 33-30	
4	50,610	North Carolina	October 1, 2011	L, 20-35	
5	50,514	Virginia Tech	September 26, 2015	W, 35–28	
6	50,410	NC State	October 16, 2010	W, 33-27^{OT}	
7	50,345	Southern Miss	November 5, 2011	L, 28-48	
8	50,277	UCF	November 19, 2011	W, 38-31	
9	50,191	Navy	November 6, 2010	L, 35-76	
10	50,145	Marshall	October 23, 2010	W, 37-10	
11	50,096	Virginia Tech	September 14, 2013	L, 15-10	
12	50,092^{†}	NC State	November 20, 1999	W, 23-6	
13	50,023	UAB	September 24, 2011	W, 28-23	
14	50,010	Tulsa	September 5, 2010	W, 51-49	
15	49,410	Tulane	October 29, 2011	W 34-13	

== Photographs of Dowdy–Ficklen Stadium ==
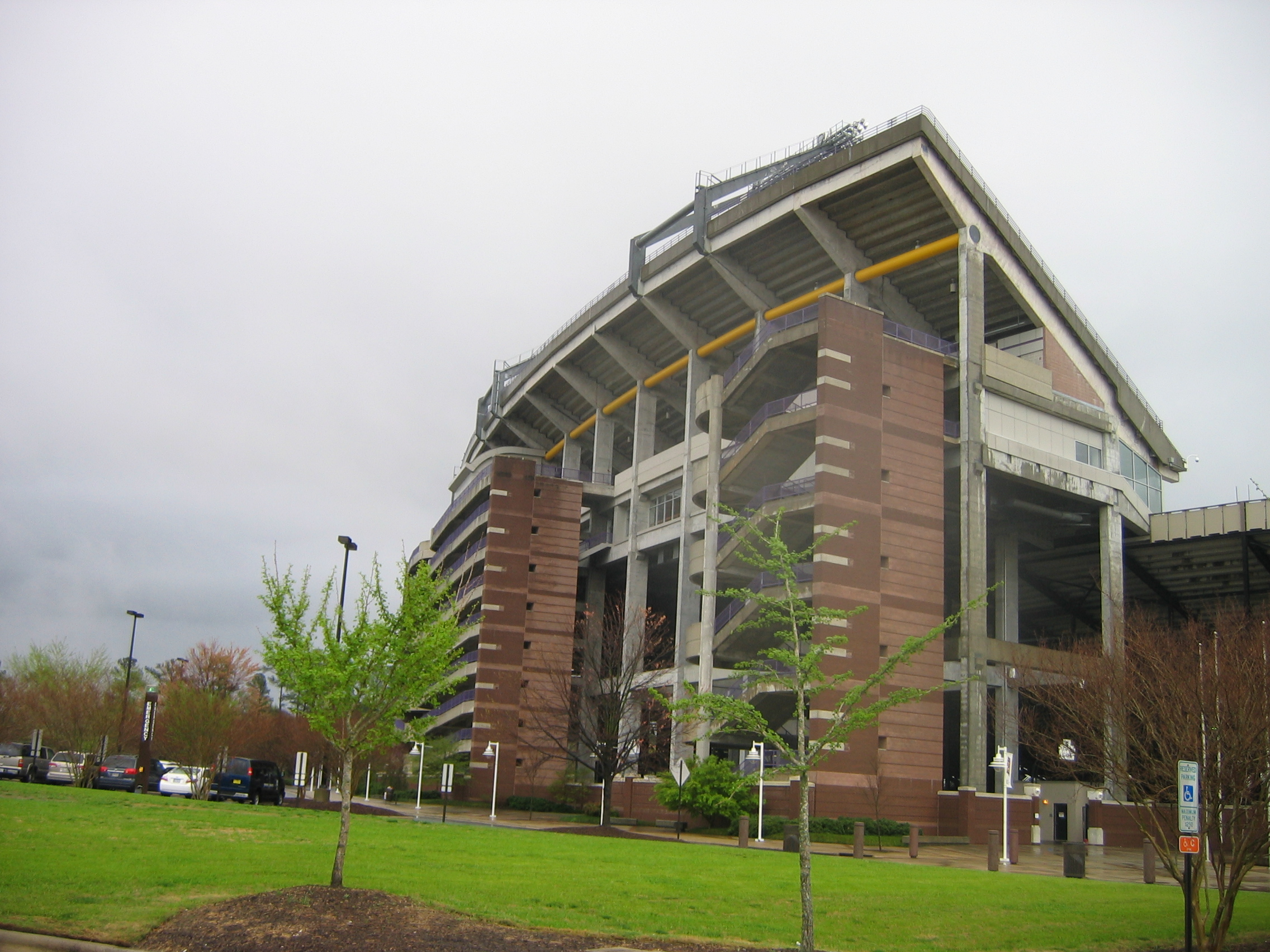

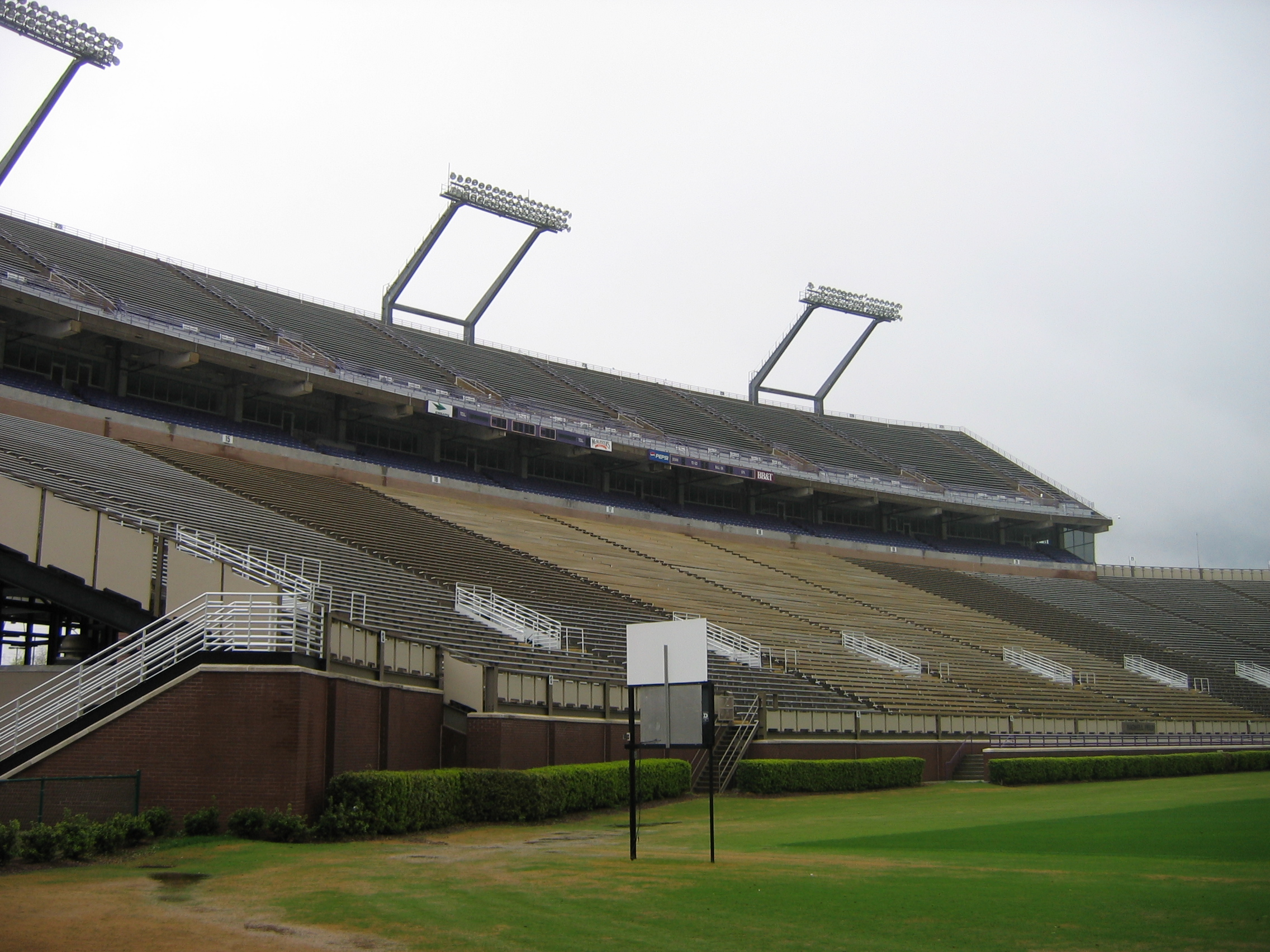
North Stands

== See also ==
- List of NCAA Division I FBS football stadiums
