= Cecil Staton =

American politician and academic administrator

11th Chancellor of East Carolina University
- In office July 1, 2016 – May 3, 2019
- Preceded by: Steven Ballard
- Succeeded by: Dan Gerlach

Member of the Georgia State Senate from the 18th district
- In office January 10, 2005 – January 12, 2015
- Preceded by: Ross Tolleson
- Succeeded by: John F. Kennedy

Personal details
- Born: Cecil Pope Staton Jr. January 26, 1958 (age 68) Greenville, South Carolina, U.S.
- Party: Republican
- Education: Furman University; Southeastern Baptist Theological Seminary; University of Oxford
- Profession: Businessman/educator
- Website: cecilstaton.com

Cecil Pope Staton Jr. (born January 26, 1958) is an American politician and academic administrator. He served as the Chancellor of East Carolina University from 2016 to 2019. Previously, Staton served as Interim President of Valdosta State University (2015–2016) and as Vice Chancellor for Extended Education with the University System of Georgia (2014–2016).

Staton served five terms as an elected official in the U.S. state of Georgia. He was a member of the Republican Party and served in the Georgia State Senate representing the 18th district, which includes portions of Bibb, Houston, Monroe, Jones, and Crawford counties. In the newly drawn maps approved by the United States Justice Department on December 23, 2011, the 18th District added Peach and Upson counties, but no longer included Jones County. The new map was in use for the 2012 and 2014 elections.

== Early life and education ==
Born in Greenville, South Carolina to Cecil Pope Staton, Sr. (1935–1999) and Shirley Hughes Staton, Staton graduated from Carolina High School in 1976, where he served as President of the student body. He graduated from Furman University in Greenville, South Carolina in 1980, winning the Baggott Award as the outstanding religion major of the graduating class. He earned Master of Divinity with Languages (1982) and Master of Theology (1985) degrees from Southeastern Baptist Theological Seminary in Wake Forest, North Carolina focusing on Hebrew, the Old Testament, and ancient near eastern studies. He earned a DPhil from University of Oxford (Regent's Park College, Oxford) in 1988, focusing on Hebrew, the Old Testament, and Ancient Near Eastern Studies. In 2014, Staton was awarded the honorary Doctor of Humanities degree by Mercer University for service and leadership in higher education and medical education for the State of Georgia.

In 2000, he received the inaugural Richard B. Furman Award from his alma mater, Furman University.

== Georgia State Senate ==
During his tenure as Senator, Staton also served as a businessman having founded two publishing companies and a broadcasting company based in Macon and Warner Robins, Georgia. The broadcasting company owned and operated 15 radio stations, an online community newspaper in Warner Robins, Georgia, and a television station in Warner Robins, serving the Macon and Warner Robins region. One of Staton's companies, Stroud & Hall Publishers, published two New York Times bestsellers by former Georgia Governor and U.S. Senator Zell Miller as well as books by 2011 presidential candidates Rick Perry and Herman Cain.

Staton was first elected in 2004, facing both primary and general election opposition. He was re-elected without opposition in 2006, 2008, and 2010. In 2012, Staton defeated a primary opponent and with no general election opponent was elected to a fifth term. He served as vice-chair of the Republican Caucus before being elected Majority Whip in November 2010, and as such served on the Committee on Assignments, which appoints committee chairs and members. in his final term, Staton also served on the Rules, Appropriations, Finance, Higher Education, Banking, and Reapportionment committees. He also served as chair of the subcommittee of Appropriations on Higher Education, responsible for the state's nearly $2 billion annual investment in higher education, and as vice-chair of the subcommittee on Community Health. For five years he served as chair of the Senate Science and Technology Committee. He was involved with higher education and health-care issues including trauma care, and sponsored elections bills including Georgia's requirement for a photo identification for elections.

During his legislative career, Staton worked in the areas of health care and higher education. In 2007, he was awarded the Star of Life award by the Georgia Association of Emergency Medical Services. In 2010, Staton was named Legislator of the Year by the Georgia Rural Health Care Association as well as Legislator of the Year by the Georgia Technology Association. In 2011, Staton was named legislator of the year by the Georgia Hospital Association. And in 2012, Georgia Bio recognized Staton as their legislator of the year at awards ceremonies held in Atlanta on January 26. In 2014, Staton received the Miller-Deal Award from the Georgia Independent College Association.

During the 2014 session, Staton announced that he would not seek re-election. In May 2014, it was announced that Staton would join the University System of Georgia as Vice-Chancellor for Extended Education. The University System of Georgia comprises 28 colleges and universities including the University of Georgia and Georgia Tech. Staton served as the Chief International Officer for the system and was responsible for the system-wide priorities of international education, continuing and professional education, entrepreneurial education, and military affairs.

== Academic career ==
=== Brewton-Parker College ===
Staton served as professor at Brewton-Parker College in Mt. Vernon, Georgia from 1989 through 1991. He served as a member of the Promotions and Tenure Committee and as an editor for the institutional self-study for renewal of accreditation (1990—1991). Staton taught New Testament, Old Testament, and Hebrew courses and was active in public relations for the college through service to area churches and speaking opportunities throughout the region.

=== Mercer University ===
He worked for Mercer University for more than eleven years (1991–2003), as Associate Provost and Associate Professor. Staton led Mercer's academic publishing efforts through Mercer University Press, with responsibility for encouraging and assisting faculty in their research and publishing endeavors. He taught courses for the Roberts Department of Religion in the College of Liberal Arts and undertook special administrative assignments as directed by the President or Provost of the University. He served on the study committee that led to the establishment of the McAfee School of Theology and as a presidential fellow in 2002, traveling to 15 comprehensive universities around the country leading to the publication of A Sturdy American Hybrid (Mercer University Press, 2003). Staton led University Advancement activities that secured more than $4,500,000 in endowment for the Mercer University Press.

=== University System of Georgia ===
Following his business career and decade as a Georgia politician, in June 2015, University System of Georgia Chancellor Hank Huckaby announced the appointment of Staton as Vice-Chancellor for Extended Education for the University System of Georgia (USG). Staton was responsible for International Education, Professional and Continuing Education, Entrepreneurship Education, and Military Affairs for the University System of Georgia, comprising 28 colleges and universities including four R-1 institutions: University of Georgia, Georgia Tech, Georgia State, and Augusta University. He served as the Chief International Officer for the USG. He worked with the Board of Regent's economic development office to identify expansion opportunities with the private sector, government, and USG supporters. Staton led efforts (2014–2015) to create the Georgia Film Academy, to support the workforce needs of Georgia's film and digital entertainment industry.

=== Valdosta State University ===
In April 2014, University System of Georgia Chancellor Hank Huckaby announced the appointment of Staton as interim President of Valdosta State University. During the interim year, Staton led efforts to balance the 2016—2017 budget by reducing expenditures by $4.4 million. He developed a $2 million marketing, branding, and imaging campaign aimed at increasing enrollment and established the VSU $1 Million Innovation Fund for proposals leading to an increase in enrollment, credit hour production, and improved graduation rates.

=== East Carolina University ===
On April 27, 2016, Staton was named Chancellor of East Carolina University, replacing outgoing chancellor Steve Ballard. Initiatives at ECU included: launching a new branding and marketing campaign increasing awareness of the institution nationally and internationally; launching initiatives to increasing research activity by 50% over five years; launching initiatives to increase internationalization including doubling the number of students participating in study abroad over five years; doubling the enrollment of the Honors College beginning fall 2017; launching initiative to increase enrollment at the Brody School of Medicine by 50% over the next five years; launching a new university enterprise partnering with SAS focusing upon rural prosperity concentrating on healthcare, education, and economic development disparities in rural North Carolina; leading ECU's Strategic Plan Extension for 2017—2022: Capture Your Horizon; launching a $500 million capital campaign, the largest in the institution's history; and leading preparations for creating ECU's 13th college, the College of Public Health, in 2021.

As Chancellor, Staton oversaw numerous capital projects including $70 million in dormitory renovations, a $60 million southside stadium renovation, opening a new $37 million student center on the health sciences campus in 2017, opening a new $122 million student union on the main campus in January 2019, and preparing for the construction of a new $8 million innovation hub and collision space for the Miller School of Entrepreneurship and a $95 million life sciences building, due to be completed in 2021. He led searches for Chief Communications Officer, Vice Chancellor of Business and Finance, Vice Chancellor of Research, Economic Development, and Engagement, and Vice Chancellor for Health Sciences and Dean of the Brody School of Medicine, as well as searches for a new Athletic Director, Head Men's Basketball Coach, and Head Football Coach.

At ECU, Staton held the rank of Professor with Tenure in Philosophy and Religious Studies.

On Monday, March 18, 2019, Staton announced that he would step down as chancellor of East Carolina University, at the conclusion of the academic year. Staton's announcement followed the departures of System President Margaret Spellings and UNC Chapel Hill Chancellor Carol Folt several weeks earlier leading many in North Carolina to express concerns about the state of the UNC system and its Board of Governors.

The ECU Board of Trustees elected Staton Chancellor Emeritus at their April 2019 meeting.

== Personal life ==
Staton is the author of several books and articles. He is married to the former Catherine Lynn Davidson of Woodruff, South Carolina. They have two children: Cecil P. Staton, III (Trey) born in 1991 and William Davidson Staton born in 1995. They reside in Macon, Georgia.
