= East Carolina University School of Dental Medicine =

Dental school in Greenville, North Carolina, US

- Type: Public dental school
- Established: 2006
- Dean: Dr. Gregory Chadwick, DDS, MS
- Students: 208
- Location: Greenville, North Carolina, U.S.
- Campus: Urban
- Colors: Royal Purple and Old Gold
- Website: dental.ecu.edu

East Carolina University School of Dental Medicine is the dental school at East Carolina University, in Greenville, North Carolina, United States, and the second dental school in North Carolina. It admitted its first cohort in fall 2011 and was created to help reduce the shortage of dentists in the state’s rural communities. It serves North Carolina statewide by educating more dentists, with the primary focus of student recruitment being students who desire to return to rural and underserved areas to provide oral health care. The SoDM built 8 community service learning centers located in rural and underserved areas throughout the state. The students will complete nine-week rotations at the service learning centers during their final year of study.

== History ==
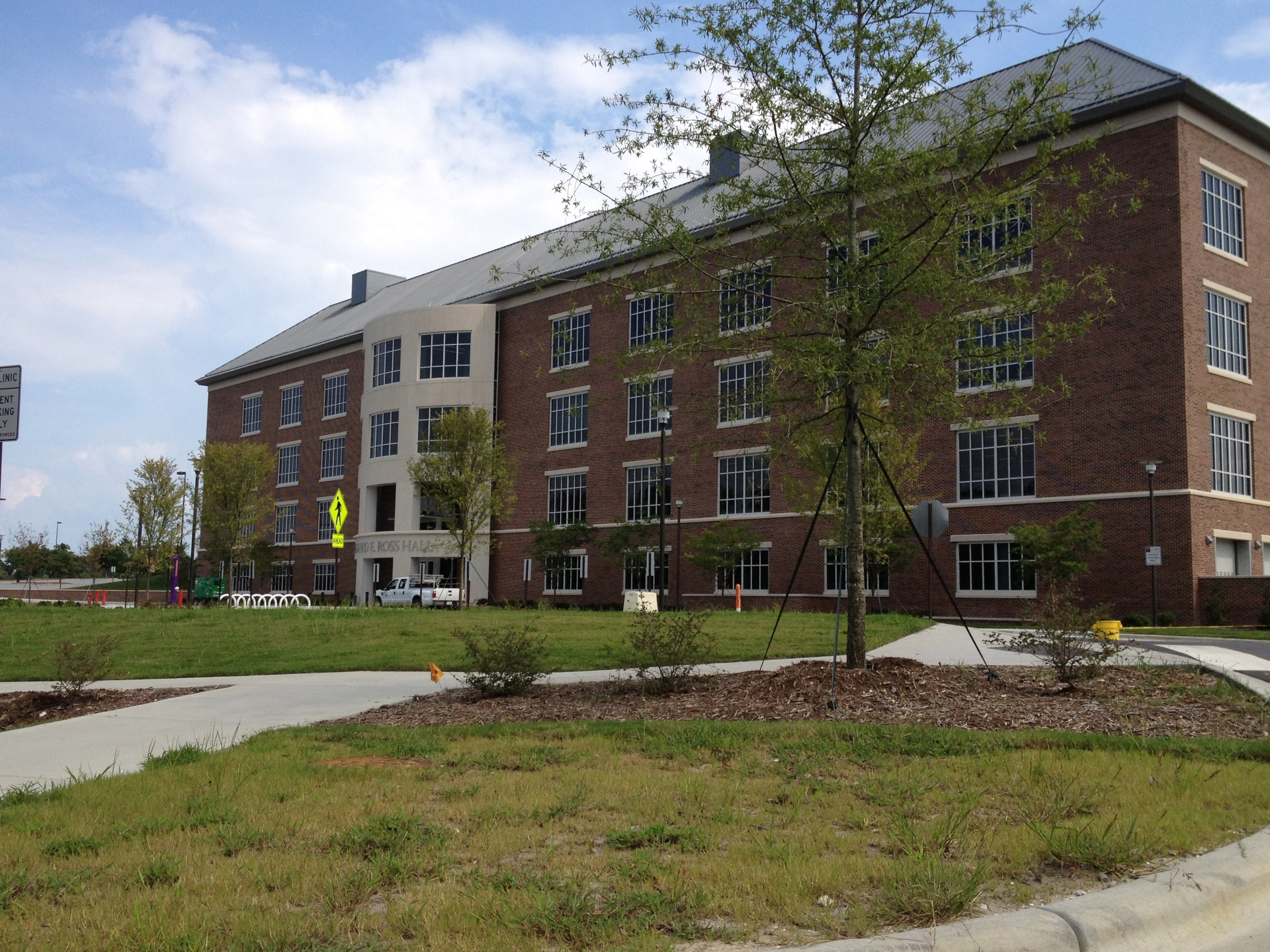
Ledyard E. Ross Hall; The main clinical facility of East Carolina University School of Dental Medicine.

The first mention of a School of Dental Medicine came from Phyllis Horns, then Interim Vice Chancellor for Health Sciences. On March 19, 2002, Vice Chancellor Horns announced at the Faculty Senate that ECU was looking into pursuing a Dental School.

On July 12, 2002 a feasibility study was reported at The University of North Carolina Board of Governors (UNC BOG) meeting at the request of Governor Mike Easley who noted fewer dentists in North Carolina were accepting Medicaid patients. It recommended the establishment of an academic dental department to support the expanded residency program, and a residency program in pediatric dentistry at East Carolina University. However, consultants cited cost as an obstacle of pursuing the school at the current time.

North Carolina is 47th in the nation in terms of dentists per capita and is especially lacking in dentists in the eastern part of the state. There are four counties, Tyrrell, Jones, Hyde and Camden without any primary practicing dentists. To remedy this situation, East Carolina and UNC-Chapel Hill have jointly developed a plan to increase the number of dentists in the state and established the ECU School of Dental Medicine.

On February 24, 2006 the East Carolina University Board of Trustees unanimously passes a resolution in supporting a Dental School. On May 11, 2006, the Committee on Educational Planning, Policies, and Programs of the UNC BOG approved the proposal to establish a dental school at East Carolina. On November 10, 2006, the UNC BOG unanimously passed the proposal. The UNC BOG requested $43.5 million each of the next two years to build the school.

In 2008 James Hupp, DMD, MD, JD was appointed as the Founding Dean. The inaugural class of 2015 began classes on August 22, 2011, with Ross Hall opening in October 2012. Ross Hall clinics welcomed their first patients in April 2013.

== Admissions ==
- For the 2016–2017 cycle, a total of 536 applications were received for the 52 seats available in the class of 2021. The Academic Average for the DAT was a 19, along with a PAT Average of 19. The average cumulative GPA of the Class of 2021 enrollees was a 3.44, and an average science GPA of 3.34
- Only North Carolina residents are considered for admission to ECU SoDM, due to the primary focus of student recruitment to be students who desire to stay and practice in underserved and rural regions of North Carolina. Therefore, Out-of-State applicants are not considered for admission into the D.M.D. Program.

== Academics ==
The East Carolina University School of Dental Medicine awards the Doctor of Dental Medicine D.M.D. Degree.The curriculum of the ECU School of Dental Medicine will offer a distinctive mix of course work that in many ways resembles the model that was developed for The Brody School of Medicine at East Carolina University, which focuses on training family doctors to serve rural counties.

- First year—Students study the cardiovascular, nervous, endocrine and reproductive systems of the body. They will learn normal, abnormal and clinical medicine. Some work will be done with dental models, known as simulators, to learn fillings, crowns and other "hand skills."
- Second year—Students learn how the human systems apply to dental health, especially how a dysfunction in another part of the body can affect the head, neck and oral cavity. They will do more advanced practice with models, as well as some time working with patients doing basic procedures such as fillings.
- Third year—Most of the students' time will be spent taking care of patients under the supervision of faculty members in the Ross Hall dental school clinics.
- Fourth year— The fourth year is divided into 5 clinical rotations, two of which take place at the Ross Hall clinics in Greenville, and three of which take place at CSLC (Community Service Learning Centers) around the state. "ECU believes that the best way to encourage practice in underserved areas is to physically train dental students in these communities," says Dr. Todd Watkins, assistant dean of dental education informatics.

The school also offers the following postdoctoral programs:

- Advanced Education in General Dentistry (AEGD)
- General Practice Residency (GPR)
- Residency in Pediatric Dentistry

== Accreditation ==
East Carolina University School of Dental Medicine recently granted accreditation by the Commission on Dental Accreditation of the American Dental Association. It was approved for initial accreditation in February 2011 and enrolled its first class in Fall 2011.

== Lack of dentists in Eastern North Carolina ==
The lack of dentists in Eastern North Carolina has been the primary motivation for East Carolina University to pursue the foundation of a dental school. North Carolina ranks 47th in dentist per 10,000 residents. Four counties, all in Eastern North Carolina have no dentist (Tyrrell County, Jones County, Hyde County, Camden County). Only eight counties have dentist to patient ratio which exceeds the national average (Wake County, Durham County, Orange County, Alamance County, Guilford County, Forsyth County, Mecklenburg County, New Hanover County). Twenty-eight counties have fewer than two dentists. Seventy-nine counties are recognized as federally designated dental shortage areas.

== Community Service Learning Centers ==
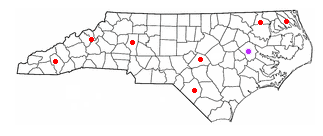
Location of the Community Dental Centers (in red) and Greenville (in purple)

East Carolina built eight Community Dental Centers located in rural and underserved areas throughout the state. Fourth-year students will complete nine-week rotations at three of the 8 clinics. Each center will accommodate four to five students. Those students will be taught by dental school faculty members based in the centers, along with advanced dental residents. The students and faculty will offer much-needed dental care to citizens in the areas surrounding the centers. Each clinic will have an office with 14 operatories, X-ray equipment, educational spaces, among other things.

As of February 1, 2017, the SoDM all 8 locations of the Community Service Learning Centers are operative:

- Ahoskie
- Elizabeth City
- Sylva
- Spruce Pine
- Lillington
- Thomasville
- Lumberton
- Bolivia

On October 20, 2009, the first three locations were announced: Ahoskie, Elizabeth City and Sylva. The Ahoskie clinic is located beside Roanoke-Chowan Hospital. The Elizabeth City clinic is built on a parcel of land across from Albemarle Hospital and College of The Albemarle. The Sylva clinic is located on a site at Southwestern Community College in Jackson County.

The first groundbreaking occurred at the Ahoskie clinic on August 23, 2011. The $3 million building is located on 113 Hertford County High Road. The dental clinic shares the building with Roanoke Chowan Community Health Center, which is a Federally Qualified Health Center. The 8,000sq ft, two-story building will be home to the corporate office of RCCHC as well. This dental clinic serves the residents of Hertford, Bertie, Northampton, Gates and other surrounding counties.

On January 19, 2011 the fourth community dental center was announced. The center is located in Lillington in Harnett County. It is located beside First Choice Community Health Center, a primary care facility. The 7,700-square-foot (720 m^{2}) facility houses 16 treatment rooms, X-ray equipment, educational space and more.

On August 2, 2011 the fifth community dental center was announced. The center is located in Spruce Pine near Mount Mitchell in Mitchell County. This dental center helps people who live in the Mayland area, which comprises Mitchell County, Avery County and Yancey County. Blue Ridge Community Hospital, also located in Spruce Pine, partners with this center.

On May 7, 2012, Robeson County commissioners voted to appropriate 2.5 acres of land to the SoDM for construction of a community service learning center in Lumberton.

On June 1, 2012 the sixth community dental center was announced. The center is located in Thomasville in Davidson County, North Carolina.

The Davidson clinic was built on the campus of Davidson County Community College. Construction was paid for with funds appropriated by the state to ECU.

== See also ==
- American Student Dental Association
