= GSMC =

GSMC may refer to:

- the Galileo Security Monitoring Centre, of the European satellite positioning and navigation system Galileo
- the Georgia Society for Managed Care, a member organization part of the Georgia Hospital Association, United States
- Global Short Message Communication service of BeiDou Navigation Satellite System
