= HHP =

HHP may refer to:

- East Carolina University College of Health and Human Performance
- Hand Held Products, a manufacturer of linear and 2D handheld barcode scanners
- Happy Home Paradise, downloadable content for the 2020 video game Animal Crossing: New Horizons
- Henry Hudson Parkway, a parkway in New York City.
- High hydrostatic pressure processing, of food
- Hilton Head Preparatory School, in South Carolina, United States
- Hip Hop Pantsula (born 1980), South African hip-hop artist
- Philippine Air Force
- Shun Tak Heliport, in Hong Kong
- University of Florida College of Health and Human Performance
