= Leo Warren Jenkins =

- Jenkins pictured in The Buccaneer 1948, East Carolina yearbook

President/Chancellor of East Carolina University
- In office 1960–1978
- Preceded by: John Decatur Messick
- Succeeded by: Thomas Bowman Brewer

Personal details
- Born: May 28, 1913 Succasunna, New Jersey, US
- Died: January 14, 1989 (aged 75) Greenville, North Carolina, US

Leo Warren Jenkins (May 28, 1913 – January 14, 1989) was the sixth president and chancellor of what is now East Carolina University in Greenville, North Carolina, United States.

He was born in the Succasunna section of Roxbury, New Jersey and raised in Elizabeth, New Jersey. He attended Rutgers University, majoring in political science, also receiving a masters from Columbia University and a doctorate from New York University. He enlisted in World War II as a marine, serving during the battle of Guam. Jenkins joined the faculty of East Carolina Teachers College in 1947 and served as Dean of the school until his election to the presidency in 1960. Under his watch, East Carolina gained university status in 1967. When ECU became part of the University of North Carolina System in 1972, Jenkins stayed on as chancellor, retiring in 1978. The Leo W. Jenkins Cancer Center at the Brody School of Medicine and the Leo W. Jenkins Fine Arts Center on main campus were named for him.
