= Dennis Hargrove Cooke =

American university executive (1904–1982)

- Cooke pictured in The Tecoan 1947, East Carolina yearbook

President of the East Carolina Teachers College
- In office 1946–1947
- Preceded by: Howard Justus McGinnis
- Succeeded by: John Decatur Messick

Personal details
- Born: February 23, 1904 Maiden, North Carolina, U.S.
- Died: March 1982 (aged 78) High Point, North Carolina, U.S.

Dennis Hargrove Cooke (February 23, 1904 – March 1982) was the fourth president of what is now East Carolina University. He was born on February 23, 1904, in Maiden, North Carolina. Dr. Cooke received the A.B. degree from Duke University in 1925. He also earned an M.A. degree from Duke in 1928. He was a teaching fellow at Duke University in 1928–29, and a teaching fellow at Peabody College in 1929–30. He then received a doctorate in 1930 from Peabody College.

Before becoming president, Cooke served as an elementary school principal, high school principal, associate professor, and chairman of the Department of Educational Administration. Cooke assumed his duties at East Carolina Teachers College on August 1, 1946, and announced his resignation in May 1947.
