= John Decatur Messick =

- Messick pictured in The Buccaneer 1948, East Carolina yearbook

President of the East Carolina Teachers College
- In office 1947–1959
- Preceded by: Dennis Hargrove Cooke
- Succeeded by: Leo Warren Jenkins

Personal details
- Born: November 9, 1897 near Aurora, North Carolina, U.S.
- Died: October 3, 1993 (aged 95) Wilmington, North Carolina, U.S.

John Decatur Messick (November 9, 1897 – October 3, 1993) was the fifth president of what is now East Carolina University. He was born on November 9, 1897, near Aurora, North Carolina. He graduated from Elon College in 1922. He then went to summer school to complete graduate work at the University of North Carolina at Chapel Hill. In 1934, he earned a Ph.D. from New York University.

In 1947, Messick became the fifth President of East Carolina Teachers College, a position he held until resigning in 1959.

From 1965 to 1968, Messick was the Executive Vice President and Dean of Academic Affairs for Oral Roberts University.
