= Thomas Bowman Brewer =

American academic administrator (1932–2018)

Thomas Bowman Brewer (July 22, 1932 – November 17, 2018) was an American academic administrator who was the second chancellor of East Carolina University, serving in that position from 1978 to 1982.

== Biography ==
Brewer was born in Fort Worth, Texas on July 22, 1932. He went to the University of Texas at Austin and received his B.A. and M.A. Brewer earned his Ph.D. from the University of Pennsylvania concentrating on American history. Before assuming the position of chancellor of ECU on July 1, 1978, Brewer was a Dean at Texas Christian University and a department chairman at the University of Toledo.

Brewer was general editor of the MacMillan Company's "Railroads of America" series. He died on November 17, 2018, at the age of 86.
