= Steven Ballard =

American academic

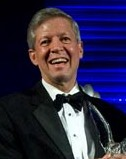
- Ballard accepting the 2010 Secretary of Defense Employer Support Freedom Award

10th Chancellor of East Carolina University
- In office June 1, 2004 – July 1, 2016
- Preceded by: Dr. William E. Shelton
- Succeeded by: Cecil Staton

Personal details
- Born: c. 1948 (age 77–78) Galesburg, Illinois
- Spouse: Nancy Adams Ballard
- Children: Nathan and Laine
- Education: Arizona '70 - B.A. with Distinction, History; Ohio State '76 - Ph.D. Political Science; Oklahoma '76-'78 - Post-Doctoral Fellow
- Profession: Academia
- Salary: $325,000
- Website: Office of the Chancellor

Steve Ballard is a former chancellor at East Carolina University. On June 1, 2004, Chancellor Ballard began his new job, becoming the tenth chief administrator at ECU.

== Early life and college ==
Ballard spent his childhood in Galesburg, Illinois, then attended the University of Arizona, where he graduated with distinction in 1970 with a bachelor's degree in history. As shortstop and captain of the Arizona Wildcats baseball team, he earned three varsity letters and played in the College World Series during his senior year.

After earning his doctorate in political science from Ohio State University in 1976, he spent the next two years as a postdoctoral fellow at the University of Oklahoma.

== Academic career ==
In 1978, he was named associate director of the science and public policy program at the University of Oklahoma. Nine years later, he was promoted to director of the program and professor of political science. In 1989, he moved to the University of Maine as founding director of the Margaret Chase Smith Center for Public Policy, a post he held until 1998. While at the University of Maine, he also served as director of the University of Maine System/State Government Partnership Program from 1990 to 1992 and as chair of the Department of Public Administration from 1991 to 1994.

He was recruited to Ohio in 1998 as vice-provost for research and dean of the Graduate School at Bowling Green State University. Three years later, he was named provost and vice chancellor for academic affairs at the University of Missouri–Kansas City.

His teaching and research have centered on leadership in the public sector, research and development and the innovation process, public policy, and the utilization of scientific and technical knowledge. He has authored five books and more than one hundred professional articles and manuscripts on such topics as environmental regulation, the evaluation of systems for child mental health, and public reactions to strategic defense initiatives and arms control policies.

On July 1, 2015, Dr. Ballard announced that he would be leaving his position as Chancellor of East Carolina University effective July 1, 2016.

== Positions held ==
- Provost, academic affairs, University of Missouri-Kansas City
- Vice provost for research and dean of the Graduate College, Bowling Green State University, 1998-June 2001.
- Founding director, Margaret Chase Smith Center for Public Policy, University of Maine, 1989-1998.
- Director, University of Maine System/State Government Partnership Program, 1990-1992.
- Chair, Department of Public Administration, University of Maine, 1991-1994.
- Director, Science and Public Policy Program and professor of political science, University of Oklahoma, 1987-1989.
- Associate director, Science and Public Policy Program, University of Oklahoma, 1978-1987.
