= Howard Justus McGinnis =

American university administrator

- Meadows pictured in The Tecoan 1945, East Carolina yearbook

President of the East Carolina Teachers College
- In office 1944–1946
- Preceded by: Leon Renfroe Meadows
- Succeeded by: Dennis Hargrove Cooke

Personal details
- Born: April 4, 1882 Glenville, West Virginia
- Died: August 26, 1971 (aged 89) North Carolina

Howard Justus McGinnis (April 4, 1882 – August 26, 1971) was an interim president of East Carolina Teachers College, now called East Carolina University. The McGinnis Theater at East Carolina University is named in his honor.

== Early life ==
Howard Justus McHinnis was born on April 4, 1882, in Kanawha River (Gilmer County), West Virginia . He attended the Glenville State College and the West Virginia University, where he majored in science. In 1927, McGinnis obtained a Ph.D. from George Peabody College.

== Career ==
He was hired as a psychology professor at East Carolina Teachers College. He was named acting president in 1944 upon the retirement of Leon Renfroe Meadows and served until August 1946.
