= University of North Carolina - Coastal Studies Institute =

US research institute

Coordinates: 35.8734°N 75.6610°W

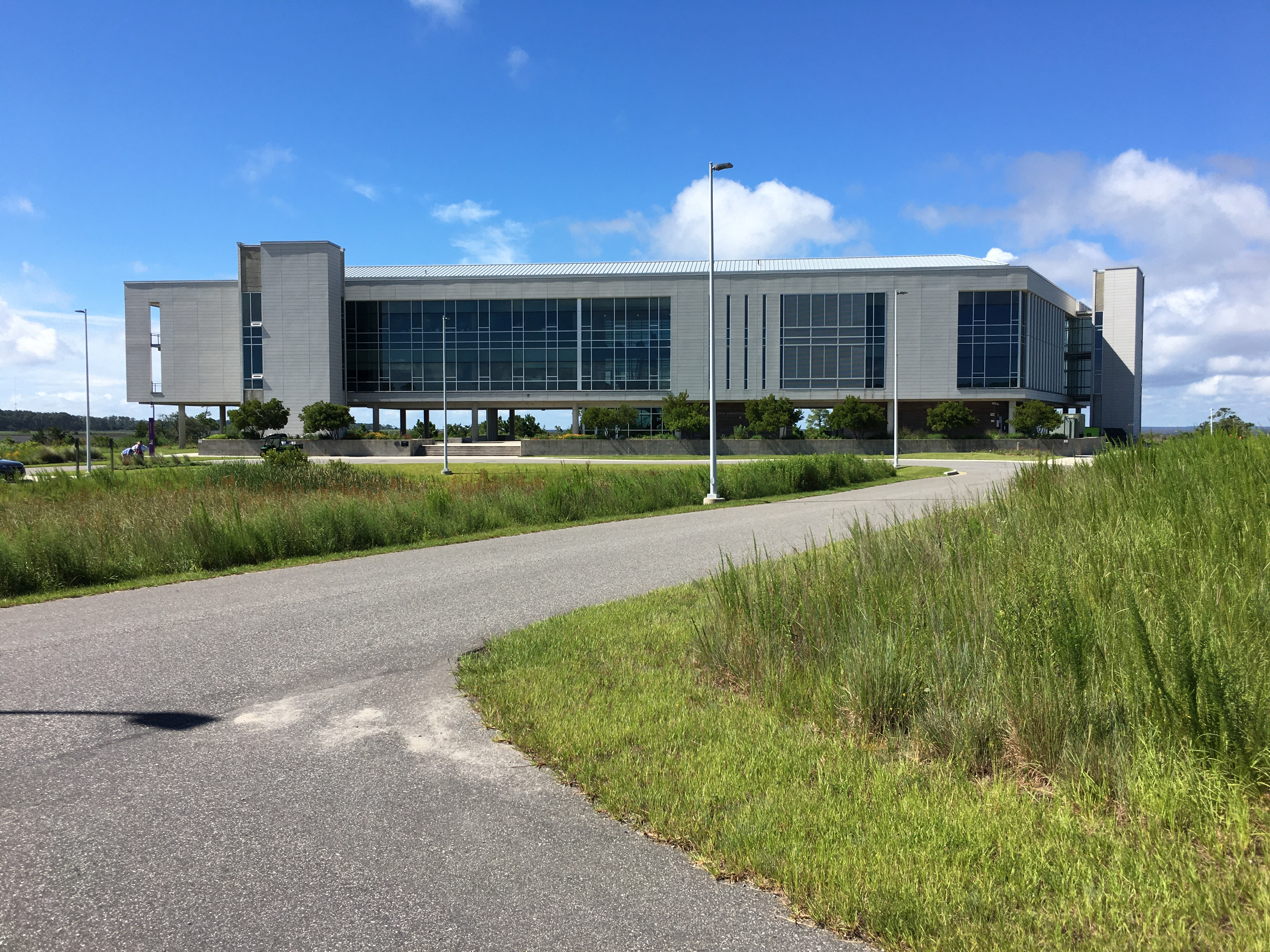
UNC Coastal Studies Institute

The UNC Coastal Studies Institute (or UNC-CSI) is a campus used for research of the coastal environments and eco-systems, at 850 NC-345, Wanchese, in the Outer Banks of North Carolina, United States. The campus serves East Carolina University, UNC Chapel Hill, North Carolina State University, UNC Wilmington and Elizabeth City State University.

UNC-CSI is a 52,000-square-foot (4,800 m^{2}) research facility, on a 200-acre (81-hectare) site along the Croatan Sound on the Outer Banks near the town of Manteo. The facility includes research labs for marine archaeology, coastal processes, estuarine ecology, public policy and engineering. The building also houses classrooms and laboratories, along with marine operations, administration and research offices.

== Design ==
The building plans for the UNC-CSI campus were designed considering guidelines set forth by the LEED program. Designers focused heavily on low energy use and water conservation. The campus contains sustainable features, including the building itself and the landscape design throughout the campus. The UNC-CSI building is LEED Gold certified (the second highest certification possible). LEED scores on a point system, from 40 (standard certification) to 80+ points for a Platinum certification. UNC-CSI was awarded 64 points and a Gold certification in 2014. The designers achieved this by integrating sustainable building materials and sustainable technologies. There are six categories in which LEED scores on, UNC-CSI's campus scored in all categories, the first being alternative transportation. This includes bicycle storage and preferred parking for low emission and carpool vehicles. On storm-water management and landscape design, 71% of the site is open space. The energy consumption is reduced by 37% and portable water consumption is reduced by 75%. 24% of the building materials are recycled and 75% of on-site waste was also recycled. The UNC Coastal Studies Institute was also designed for 95% of occupiable space to be exposed to daylight.
