= East Carolina University College of Business =

Business school of East Carolina University

Coordinates: 35.6061°N 77.3652°W

College of Business
- Type: Public Business School
- Established: 1936
- Affiliations: AACSB
- Dean: Dr. Paul Schwager
- Faculty: 117
- Students: 4,566
- Undergraduates: 3,746
- Postgraduates: 820
- Location: Greenville, North Carolina, United States
- Website: business.ecu.edu

The College of Business is the business school at East Carolina University. Founded in 1936, and claiming distinction as the second oldest business school in North Carolina, the College houses both undergraduate and graduate students. The College's undergraduate programs were accredited by the Association to Advance Collegiate Schools of Business (AACSB) in 1967, and the College's graduate programs were accredited by the AACSB in 1976. Out of North Carolina's 23 business schools, ten, including ECU, are accredited by the AACSB. It is a part of the GMAC governing body.

The College grants two undergraduate degrees, the Bachelor of Science in Business Administration and the Bachelor of Science in Hospitality Management. The College grants two graduate degrees, the Master of Business Administration and the Master of Science in Accounting, as well as opportunities for a dual degree with the Brody School of Medicine. The College places a heavy emphasis on its tight-knit and residential character, and has a student population that hovers over 3,000 students and a full-time faculty of 117.

In 2004, East Carolina became one of the first universities in the United States to offer the MBA completely online. In 2012, East Carolina's online MBA ranked third nationally and first in North Carolina for quality and affordability.

== History ==
The College of Business was founded in 1936 as the Department of Commerce, with Dr. Elmer Browning was the founding Dean. The department was renamed the School of Business in 1960. In 1967, the College was accredited by the Association to Advance Collegiate Schools of Business (AACSB). Dr. James Bearden became the School's second Dean in 1968. Under his guidance, the school started the Master of Business Administration (MBA) program, which was accredited by the AACSB in 1976. Dr. Bearden also helped to establish the BB&T Center for Leadership Development after BB&T donated over $3 million to the College. Dr. Ernie Uhr became the third Dean in 1983, and under Dr. Uhr's leadership, the School moved from the Rawl Building to the Harold H. Bate Building. Further, during Dr. Uhr's tenure, additional MBA concentrations and the dual MD/MBA program began, while East Carolina became one of the first universities to offer online MBA courses during his term. In 2002, school changed its name from the Business School to the College of Business. Dr. Rick Niswander became the fourth Dean in 2004, and the new Leadership and Professional Development program came to fruition in 2009. In December 2010, Dr. Stanley G. Eakins became the interim Dean of the College. In 2019, Dr. Paul Schwager was named the College's sixth dean. Dr. Schwager left ECU in 2022 and Dr. Michael Harris was announced as the Interim Dean for the college.

== Undergraduate ==
Degree	Students
Accounting	386
Finance	542
Hospitality Management	318
Management	1,351
Management Information Systems	280
Marketing and Supply Chain; Management	869
Total	3,746

The college offers five undergraduate degrees with many concentrations in addition to a general business minor. The degree in Finance has two concentrations: Financial services, Managerial finance, Risk management & insurance. The degree in Management has three concentrations: Entrepreneurship/Small Business, International Business and Management. The degree in Marketing and Supply Chain Management has three concentrations: Electronic Commerce, Marketing and Operations/Supply Chain Management. The degree in Management Information Systems doesn't have a concentration.

Of the undergraduate students, 86% are Full-time, while 14% are Part-time. The majority of students, 69%, live on campus, while 15% are entirely online, and 16% are on campus and online. The student body is made up of 62% males and 38% females. The declared business majors average GPA is 3.03.

== Graduate ==
The Graduate Program in the College of Business offers two degrees; Masters of Business Administration and Master of Science in Accounting. The MBA program is delivered both online and on campus in Greenville. The College of Business, along with the Brody School of Medicine offer a joint M.D./M.B.A. Degree. The M.B.A. program offers ten optional certificates such as Finance and Sport Management.

The M.S.A. program is a fast paced program designed for either Accounting or Non-Accounting Majors. Additionally, the College offers an intensive five-year program, which, upon completing all requirements, grants students both a B.S.B.A. in Accounting and an M.S.A.
