= Leon Renfroe Meadows =

American academic administrator

Leon R. Meadows
- Meadows pictured in The Tecoan 1935, East Carolina yearbook

President of the East Carolina Teachers College
- In office 1934–1944
- Preceded by: Robert Herring Wright
- Succeeded by: Howard Justus McGinnis

Personal details
- Born: April 14, 1884; Lafayette, Alabama
- Died: March 6, 1953 (aged 68); Gallipolis, Ohio

Leon Renfroe Meadows (April 14, 1884 – March 6, 1953) was the second president at East Carolina Teachers College. On October 5, 1934, he moved from the summer school director to the president, succeeding Robert Herring Wright.
