= East Carolina University College of Health and Human Performance =

East Carolina University College of Health and Human Performance (founded in 1907) is an American college of Health and Human Performance. It has five departments and nine laboratories. It offers degrees in Bachelor of Science, Bachelor of Arts, Master of Arts, Master of Arts in Education, Master of Science and Ph.D.

== History ==
The College of Health and Human Performance might be a relatively new college in its reconfigured form, but it has roots in the founding of ECU in 1907. The original department, in 1907 was called the Department of Physical Education. By the time East Carolina gained University status the little department grew into the Department of Health, Physical Education, Recreation and Safety, which was housed under the College of Arts and Sciences. In 1982, the Human Performance Laboratory was instituted and immediately established itself as an important campus-wide facility for research and clinical programs dealing with an array of scientific and health-related issues. In 1993, the Department of Health, Physical Education, Recreation and Safety became the eleventh professional school on the East Carolina University campus. In 2003 the School of Health & Human Performance became the College of Health & Human Performance.

== Departments ==
There are eight academic units under the College of Health and Human Performance umbrella. The Department of Kinesiology works to promote well-being through academic and research leadership in human movement and sport. The Department of Health Education and Promotion seeks to advance knowledge and understanding of the factors affecting health, and prepare students for professional and leadership roles in athletic training, environmental health, and health education and promotion. The Department of Recreation and Leisure Studies works to prepare future leaders in recreation, parks, tourism, and recreational therapy to enhance the quality of life for all in a variety of settings. The Department of Aerospace Studies (Air Force ROTC) commissions pilots, navigators, and a majority of ECU cadets into non-flying Air Force Officers positions. The Department of Military Science (Army ROTC) recruits, retains, develops and graduates leaders who are mentally, physically, emotionally, and morally ready to serve the Nation as commissioned officers in the US Army.

== Laboratories and centers ==
The College of Health and Human Performance has nine laboratories. The Activity Promotion Lab is a lab to research projects on physical activity, fitness, and obesity in children. The Biomechanics Lab was built to discover, disseminate, and use knowledge concerning the biomechanics of human movement. The Biofeedback Lab is an accredited training lab where students work with biofeedback and video gaming to assist with stress and anxiety reduction, childhood obesity, and posttraumatic stress disorder (particularly with returning Armed Forces service members). The Human Performance Lab is to discover and disseminate knowledge in the area of exercise physiology through research, service and education. The Developmental Motor Lab has been preparing adapted physical education specialists to meet the activity needs of children and adults with disabilities since 1978. The Regional Training Center is a substance abuse prevention/education program targeting adult populations within the state who have contact with high risk youth and young adults. The Visual Motor Lab engages in projects that examine visual attention, arousal, mental workload and attentional bias. The Sensory Lab provides the equipment and space to research various projects involving sensory stimulation as well as observation, sound and listening based research. Multiple computer labs are also housed in the College of HHP.

== Undergraduate ==
The college offers many Bachelor of Science and Bachelor of Arts degrees.

The Department of Kinesiology offers four Bachelor of Science programs and two minors (Exercise and Sport Science, Sports Studies):

- Exercise Physiology
- Health Fitness Specialist
- Physical Education
- BS Sports Studies

The Department of Health Education and Promotion offers four Bachelor of Science Programs:

- Athletic Training
- BS Environmental Health
- BS Public Health Studies
- BS School Health Education

The Department of Recreation and Leisure Studies offers two Bachelor of Science degrees, and two certificates.

=== Certificate ===
- Aquatics Management
- Biofeedback

== Graduate and doctoral ==
The college offers a Master of Arts, Master of Arts in Education, Master of Science and Ph.D. degrees.

The Department of Kinesiology offers MS degrees, an MAT, MAEd and Ph.D. degrees and one certificate program.

- MS Exercise and Sport Science.
- Physical Education
- Bioenergetics and Exercise Science

=== Certificate ===
Sport Management

The Department of Health Education and Promotion offers three graduate degrees.

- Health Education and Promotion
- MAEd School Health Education
- Environmental Health

The Department of Recreation and Leisure Studies offers two Master of Science degrees and two certificates.

- MS in Recreation and Park Administration
- MS in Recreational Therapy Administration

Certificates

- Aquatic Therapy
- Biofeedback Certificate
