= East Carolina University College of Education =

The East Carolina University College of Education is the oldest college at East Carolina University. The original mission of ECU was as a teacher training school.

The college has ten undergraduate programs, eight graduate programs, a doctoral program, and an Educational Specialist/Certificate of Advanced Study.

== History ==
East Carolina Teachers Training School (ECTTS), a two-year teacher training school, was chartered in 1907 . ECTTS began classes in 1909.

The college is preparing retiring military personnel to transition into the teaching profession through the Troops to Teachers Program with an advising office located at Fort Bragg.

On August 13 East Carolina University alumnus Henry Pryce was inducted into the Educators Hall of Fame.

== Undergraduate degrees ==
The college offers seven Bachelor of Science (BS) and four Bachelor of Science in Business Education (BSBE). The BS degree in Family and Consumer Sciences Education is offered from the college of Human Ecology.

== Doctoral degrees ==
The doctoral program is a Doctor of Educational Leadership. The degree also offers a concentration in Higher Education Administration that is designed for individuals who seek administrative positions in higher education.
