= East Carolina University College of Nursing =

Public nursing school in Greenville, North Carolina, US

The College of Nursing is a college located within East Carolina University in Greenville, North Carolina, United States. It offers one undergraduate degree, nursing. The college offers a Masters of Science in Nursing with eight concentrations. The college also offers a PhD program. This program is to advance nursing practice and nursing education.

On October 12, 2007, the University of North Carolina Board of Governors permitted the re-designation of the School of Nursing to the College of Nursing.
