= College of Fine Arts and Communication at East Carolina University =

The College of Fine Arts & Communication at East Carolina University is composed of four schools. The college was created on July 1, 2003, but has its roots to the beginning of ECU in 1907. The School of Theatre and Dance runs productions by the East Carolina Playhouse (student theatre) and the East Carolina Summer Theatre (professional company). In 2022, Linda Kean was appointed dean of the College of Fine Arts and Communication.
