= Georgia Hospital Association =

The Georgia Hospital Association (GHA) is a non-profit trade association of more than 150 hospital and health system members. GHA was established in 1929 and provides education, research and risk management services to its members. It also represents and advocates health policy issues benefiting Georgia's citizens before the state legislature and U.S. Congress as well as before regulatory bodies. GHA is headquartered in Atlanta, Georgia and is an allied member of the American Hospital Association.

== Affiliated societies ==
The Georgia Hospital Association sponsors the following a professional membership societies:

- Georgia Academy of Healthcare Attorneys (GAHA)
- Georgia Association for Development Professionals (GADP)
- Georgia Organization of Nurse Leaders (GONL)
- Georgia Society of Volunteer and Retail Professionals (GSVRP)
- Georgia Society for Healthcare Chaplains (GSHC)
- Georgia Society for Healthcare Human Resources Administration (GSHHRA)
- Georgia Society for Healthcare Marketing and Public Relations (GSHMPR)
- Georgia Society for Healthcare Materials Management (GSHMM)
- Georgia Society for Healthcare Physician Services and Recruitment (GSHPSR)
- Georgia Association for Healthcare Facility Managers (GAHFM)
- Georgia Society for Managed Care (GSMC)

== Georgia Society for Healthcare Materials Management ==
The Georgia Society for Healthcare Materials Management (GSHMM) is a professional membership society of the Georgia Hospital Association. The society's membership includes directors of materials management, chief purchasing officers and other healthcare supply chain executives from Georgia hospitals and health systems. GSHMM is an affiliated chapter of the Association of Healthcare Resource and Materials Management (AHRMM).

On March 2, 2009, the GSHMM issued a press release becoming the first state society or association to publicly announce its endorsement of GS1 Healthcare US supply chain standards.

In 2021, AHRMM designated GSHMM as a Gold Chapter.
