= East Carolina University College of Allied Health Sciences =

Coordinates: 35.612581°N 77.405914°W

The College of Allied Health Sciences is a constituent college of East Carolina University. Established in 1967, it was recognized as North Carolina's first allied health college.
