= Robert Herring Wright =

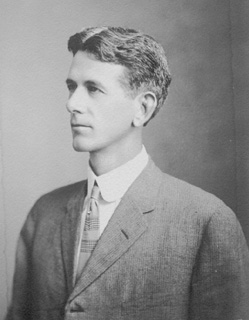

President of the East Carolina Teachers Training School
- In office 1909–1934
- Succeeded by: Leon Renfroe Meadows

Personal details
- Born: May 21, 1870 Sampson County, North Carolina, United States
- Died: April 25, 1934 (aged 63) Greenville, North Carolina, United States

Robert Herring Wright (May 21, 1870 – April 25, 1934) was the first president of East Carolina Teachers Training School.

Wright received his Bachelor of Arts degree in 1897 from the University of North Carolina. He completed further education at Johns Hopkins University and Columbia University. He held many teaching posts until he was asked by Thomas Jordan Jarvis to serve as the first president in 1909. By 1920, Wright successfully lobbied the North Carolina state legislature to approve a four-year curriculum, which forced a re-charter and name change to East Carolina Teachers College. The Wright Building on the main campus at ECU is named for him. He died of a heart attack in 1934.
