= Thomas Harriot College of Arts and Sciences =

College of East Carolina University

The Thomas Harriot College of Arts and Sciences is the liberal arts college at East Carolina University. Its Departments comprise courses of study in mathematics, the natural sciences, the social sciences, and the humanities.

In 1941, the Board of Trustees approved an undergraduate degree program in liberal arts disciplines for students wanting to pursue a non-teaching degree. When East Carolina College was elevated to university status in 1967, the School of Arts and Sciences became the College of Arts and Sciences, the home of the liberal arts. The school is named for Thomas Harriot, a cartographer, historian, and surveyor who took part in Sir Walter Raleigh's second expedition to Virginia.

== Organization ==
The Departments of the College are:

- Anthropology
- Biology
- Chemistry
- Criminal Justice and Criminology
- Earth, Environment and Planning
- Economics
- English
- Foreign Languages and Literatures
- History
- Mathematics
- Philosophy
- Religious Studies
- Physics
- Political Science
- Psychology
- Sociology

There are interdisciplinary programs in:

- Asian studies
- African and African-American studies
- Coastal and marine studies
- Ethnic Studies
- International Studies
- Leadership
- Medieval and Renaissance studies
- Multidisciplinary Studies
- Religious studies
- Russian studies
- Transformative Texts and Ideas
- University Studies
