= East Carolina University =

Public university in Greenville, North Carolina, US

- Former names: East Carolina Teachers Training School (1907–1920); East Carolina Teachers College (1920–1951); East Carolina College (1951–1967)
- Motto: Servire (Latin)
- Motto in English: "To serve"
- Type: Public research university
- Established: March 8, 1907; 119 years ago
- Founder: Thomas J. Jarvis
- Parent institution: University of North Carolina
- Accreditation: SACS
- Academic affiliations: ORAU; Sea-grant
- Endowment: $360 million (2025)
- Chancellor: Philip Rogers
- Faculty: 1,997
- Administrative staff: 3,603
- Students: 28,021
- Undergraduates: 22,463
- Postgraduates: 5,558
- Location: Greenville, North Carolina, United States; 35°36′27″N 77°22′12″W
- Campus: 1,386 acres (6 km^{2}) (total) 530 acres (2 km^{2}) (Main campus); 206 acres (1 km^{2}) (Health Sciences Campus); 650 acres (3 km^{2}) (West Research Campus); Small city
- Other campuses: Wanchese
- Newspaper: The East Carolinian
- Colors: Purple and gold
- Nickname: Pirates
- Sporting affiliations: NCAA Division I FBS – The American
- Mascot: PeeDee the Pirate
- Website: ecu.edu

East Carolina University (ECU) is a public research university in Greenville, North Carolina, United States. It is the fourth largest university in North Carolina. It is unique in North Carolina in that it hosts schools of medicine, dentistry, and engineering at the same university.

Founded on March 8, 1907, as a teacher training school, East Carolina has grown from its original 43 acres (17 ha) to almost 1,600 acres (647 ha) today. The university's academic facilities are located on six properties: Main Campus; Health Sciences Campus; West Research Campus; the Field Station for Coastal Studies in New Holland, North Carolina; the Millennial Research Innovation Campus in Greenville's warehouse district; and an overseas campus in Certaldo Alto, Italy. ECU also operates the Coastal Studies Institute.

The university has nine undergraduate colleges, graduate school, and four professional schools. All of the non-health sciences majors are located on the main campus. The College of Nursing, College of Allied Health Sciences, The Brody School of Medicine, and School of Dental Medicine are located on the health science campus. ECU is classified among "R1: Doctoral Universities – Very High research activity".

There are 11 social sororities, 16 social fraternities, four historically black sororities, five historically black fraternities, one Native American fraternity, and one Native American sorority. There are over 400 registered clubs on campus including fraternities and sororities.

== History ==
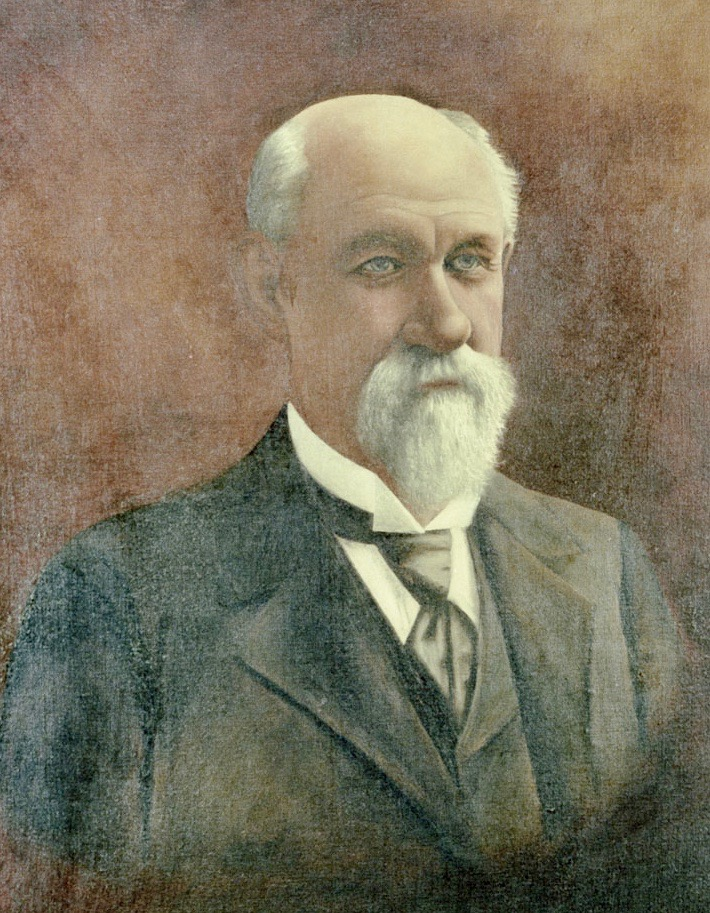
Father of East Carolina University, Thomas Jordan Jarvis

On March 8, 1907, East Carolina Teachers Training School (ECTTS) was officially chartered by the North Carolina General Assembly through the passing of legislation Public Laws of North Carolina, 1907, Chapter 820 titled An Act to Stimulate High School Instruction in the Public Schools of the State and Teacher Training. The chairman of its original Board of Trustees, Thomas Jordan Jarvis, a former Governor of North Carolina now known as the "Father of ECU", participated in groundbreaking ceremonies for the first buildings on July 2, 1908, in Greenville, North Carolina, and ECTTS opened its doors on October 5, 1909. Although its purpose was to train "young white men and women", there were no male graduates until 1932. In 1920, ECTTS became a four–year institution and renamed East Carolina Teachers College; its first bachelor's degrees were awarded the following year in education. A master's degree program was authorized in 1929; the first such degree granted by the college was in 1933. Progress toward full college status was made in 1948 with the designation of the Bachelor of Arts as a liberal arts degree, and the Bachelor of Science as a teaching degree. A change of name to East Carolina College in 1951 reflected this expanded mission. Over the objections of Governor Dan K. Moore, who opposed the creation of a university system separate from the Consolidated University of North Carolina, ECC was made a regional university effective July 1, 1967, and assumed its present name, East Carolina University. The university did not remain independent for long; on July 1, 1972, it was incorporated into the University of North Carolina System, the successor to the Consolidated University. Today, ECU is the fourth–largest university in North Carolina with 22,463 undergraduate and 5,558 graduate students, including the 344 medicine and 206 dental students.

== Campus ==
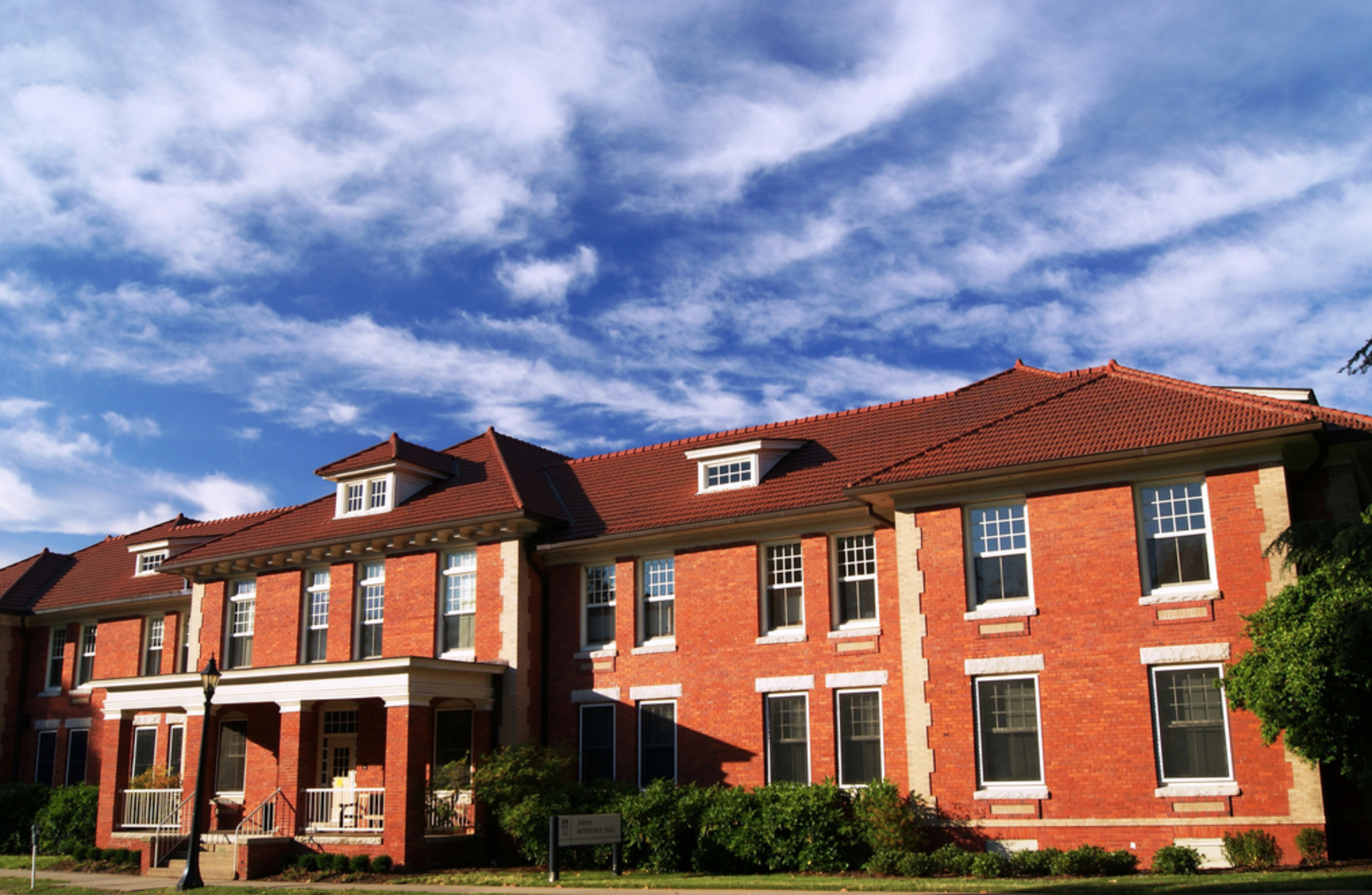
Jarvis Residence Hall on central campus at ECU

East Carolina is separated into three distinct campuses: Main Campus, Health Sciences Campus, and West Research Campus. It owns two sports complexes: Blount Recreational Sports Complex and North Recreational Complex. It owns a field station in New Holland, North Carolina.

=== Main ===
The main campus, also known as the east campus, is about 530 acres (2 km^{2}) in an urban residential area of downtown Greenville. The 158 buildings on main campus comprise more than 4.6 million square feet (430,000 m^{2}) of academic, research, and residential space. Many of the Main Campus buildings feature the Spanish–Mission style architecture; inspiration drawn from Thomas Jarvis' time as an ambassador to Brazil. He wanted to bring the unique architecture to eastern North Carolina. On the main campus, there are five districts: Campus Core, Downtown District, Warehouse District, Athletic fields and the South Academic District. On the Campus Core, there are 15 residence halls which are divided into three separate neighborhoods. In the middle of the mall is the replica of the cupola on the original Austin building.

==== Athletic fields ====
The varsity athletics fields are located south of the College Hill residential neighborhood. Fourteenth Street divides College Hill to the north, with the athletic fields to the south. Charles Boulevard borders the fields to the west and Greenville Boulevard borders it to the south. A residential neighborhood and Elmhurst Elementary School are the eastern borders. The northern portion of the area sits Dowdy–Ficklen Stadium, Minges Coliseum, and Minges Natatorium, along with parking. The Murphy Center, which is the primary strength and conditioning, and banquet building, is located between Dowdy-Ficklen and Minges Coliseum. The Ward Sports Medicine Building, Scales Field House, and the Pirate Club Building also surround Dowdy-Ficklen. The Ward Sports Medicine Building houses offices for football, Pirate Club, and athletic administration. The Scales Field House provides locker rooms, additional athletic department offices for marketing and event operations, and classroom space for ECU's athletic training program. South of those facilities is the Cliff Moore Practice Facility which has a pair of natural grass fields and one FieldTurf field designed exclusively for the football team. On the southern border of the practice facility is Clark-LeClair Stadium, which is the men's baseball stadium. It opened in 2005 and seats 3,000 in permanent seating with another 2,000 located in the outfield. At the southern end of the fields is the Olympic Sports Complex, which include women's soccer stadium, softball stadium, track and field facility, and Olympic Sports Team building. The Olympic Sports Complex was completed in 2011 with a price of $23.4 million. The Smith-Williams Center is a $17 million basketball development and practice facility, opened in 2013. The football stadium is planning for a $40 million upgrade. The upgrades will include a new press, club, and suite areas, and upper deck, all located on the south side. This addition will increase the capacity from 50,000 to 60,000.

East Carolina has spent $92 million on athletic projects from 1998 to 2011. Including the proposed projects, this is increased to $145 million.

=== Health Sciences ===
The Health Sciences campus prepares health care practitioners across a full range of professions, including nurses, dentists, physical therapists, speech therapists, physicians, and more. Many graduates of ECU health sciences remain in the underserved East Carolina region to provide care in the area. It is situated beside ECU Health Medical Center. ECU Health Medical Center was originally Pitt County Memorial Hospital and Vidant Medical Center (VMC). After becoming a private non-profit hospital, the renaming occurred. ECU Health Medical Center, an 861–bed flagship Level I Trauma Center, serves as the academic medical center for The Brody School of Medicine. ECU Health owns ECU Health Medical Center, leases or owns six and manages one. The area is about 2 miles (3.2 km) west of Main Campus on 206 acres (0.8 km^{2}) with nearly 1,300,000 square feet (121,000 m^{2}) of academic and research space in 62 buildings. Other buildings besides VMC include Brody Medicine Science Building, the East Carolina Heart Institute, Leo Jenkins Cancer Center, and the Allied Health building composed of the College of Nursing, Laupus Medical Library and College of Allied Health Sciences. The 117,000 square feet (11,000 m^{2}) Family Medicine Center opened in the fall of 2011. Ross Hall, which houses the School of Dental Medicine, is just under 200,000 square feet.

=== West Research ===
West Research Campus lies on approximately 600 acres (2.4 km^{2}) 4 miles (6.4 km) west of the Health Sciences Campus. It consists of four buildings with 36,000-square-foot (3,300 m^{2}) on the former Voice of America site. Approximately 367 acres (1.49 km^{2}) are designated wetlands and large areas of biology, botany and other sciences field study sites. It has an environmental health onsite wastewater demonstration facility which is open to the public and all educators. It is also the home of the North Carolina Institute for Health and Safety in Agriculture, Forestry, and Fisheries with an administrative and several support buildings.

==== Institutes and centers ====
- The Brody School of Medicine at East Carolina University
- East Carolina University School of Dental Medicine
- East Carolina Heart Institute
- Leo W. Jenkins Cancer Center
- Innovation Design Lab
- Family Medicine Center
- Coastal Studies Institute
- Center for Epidemiology and Outcomes Research
- Small Business Institute
- Institute for Coastal Science and Policy
- Pediatric Healthy Weight Research and Treatment Center
- Center for Sustainable Tourism
- Center for Sustainability
- Center for Natural Hazards
- Center for Geographic Information Science
- Center for GIScience
- Center for Applied Computational Studies
- Center for Science, Technology, Engineering and Mathematics Education
- Center for Survey Research
- Lost Colony Center for Science & Research
- East Carolina Diabetes and Obesity Institute
- Pocosin Arts Riverside Lodge
- NC Agromedicine Institute
- Golden LEAF Educational Consortium
- NC Statewide Telepsychiatry Program
- Center for Telepsychiatry and e-Behavioral Health

=== Community Service Learning Centers ===
The School of Dental Medicine built 8 community service learning centers located in rural and underserved areas throughout the state of North Carolina. The fourth-year students learn and provide care for the community for one year in these community centers. All 8 community centers are currently active. They are located in Ahoskie, Elizabeth City, Lillington, Spruce Pine, Bolivia, Thomasville, Lumberton, and Sylva.

=== Field Station for Coastal Studies ===
The field station is located in New Holland, North Carolina. The area serves as a field station for the coastal studies, coastal resource management, and biology programs. The main goal of the field station is economic development into the region through both environmental education and eco–tourism. It also serves as a facility for small retreats and as a base for research on coastal issues. It was listed on the National Register of Historic Places in 1980. It is adjacent to the 49,925-acre (202 km^{2}) Mattamuskeet Wildlife Refuge.

=== North Recreational Complex ===
North Recreational Complex (NRC) is an athletic complex located on a 129-acre (522,044.5 m^{2}) parcel of land north of East Carolina University's main campus. The NRC is one of the USA's largest recreational complexes.

=== UNC Coastal Studies Institute ===
ECU houses and manages the UNC Coastal Studies Institute (UNC-CSI) which is an inter-university, marine research institute located on Roanoke Island in Manteo along the Croatan Sound on the Outer Banks, established in 2003 focusing on Estuarine Ecology and Human Health, Coastal Processes and Engineering, Public Policy and Coastal Sustainability, and Maritime Heritage.

== Administration ==
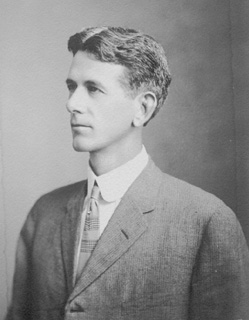
First President of what is now ECU, Robert Herring Wright

There have been six presidents and seven Chancellors in the university's history. Robert Herring Wright was inaugurated as the first president of ECTTS on November 13, 1909. The chief administrator changed names after ECU joined the UNC System in 1972. The chancellor is chosen by the University of North Carolina Board of Governors on the recommendation of the board's president, and he reports to the 12–member Board of Trustees at ECU. Four of the twelve trustees are picked by the Governor of North Carolina, while the other eight are picked by the Board of Governors. The ECU student body president is an ex officio member of the board of trustees.

Cecil Staton became chancellor in 2016, replacing Steve Ballard. After Staton resigned in 2019, the UNC System named Dan Gerlach as the interim chancellor. In late September 2019, Gerlach was placed on administrative leave after photos and video emerged, showing his interaction with students at a popular bar in the downtown area. UNC System Interim President Bill Roper announced that ECU Provost and Senior Vice Chancellor Ronald Mitchelson will serve as the university's acting chancellor, and Philip Rogers was named the 12th Chancellor in December 2020.

== Academics ==
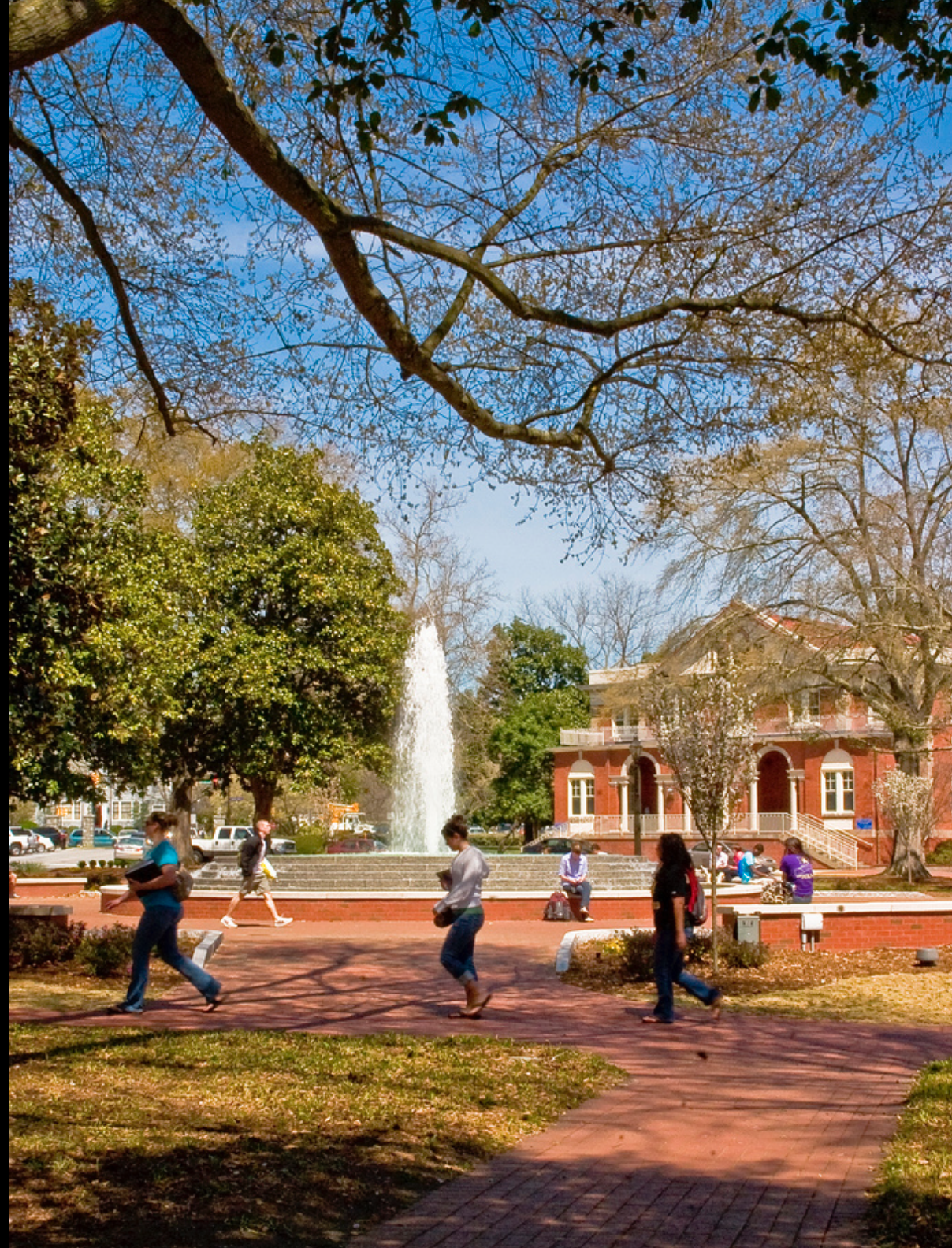
The Trustees Fountain at Wright Circle on the main campus at East Carolina University

ECU is home to nine undergraduate colleges, a graduate school, and four professional schools. The oldest school is the modern day College of Education. The university offers 16 doctoral degree programs, 4 first professional degree programs, 76 master's degree programs, and 102 bachelor's degree programs.

ECU's liberal arts college is the Thomas Harriot College of Arts and Sciences. It consists of 16 departments, making it the third largest College. The liberal arts college has its roots in the beginning of the university.

The College of Business is a professional school consisting of six departments with undergraduate concentrations in each, plus the Miller School of Entrepreneurship and a Master of Business Administration and Master of Science in Accounting program. The college's beginnings came in 1936 when the Department of Commerce was organized. It later changed to the Department of Business Education, and then to the Department of Business. Finally, in 1960, the School of Business was formed. The college undergraduate program was accredited in 1967, and the graduate program was accredited in 1976 by The Association to Advance Collegiate Schools of Business. The college is a governing school of the Graduate Management Admission Council. The college runs a Small Business Institute to advise small business owners on how to succeed.

The College of Education is the oldest and largest college at ECU. It houses and administers all of the education majors and an international open access journal, the Journal of Curriculum and Instruction. There are 17 undergraduate degree programs, 22 graduate degree programs, six advanced certifications, and the Doctor of Education program. The college prepares more professionals for North Carolina schools than any other university in the state. The college scored higher than other North Carolina universities when the state board evaluated teacher education programs in 2006. In addition, the Institution of Higher Education Performance Report showed ECU was first in the number of graduates who were employed in public schools across the state. The college is considered one of the exemplary professional preparation programs according to the North Carolina State Board of Education's Higher Education Performance Report.

The College of Fine Arts and Communication comprises four schools that range from dance to design and broadcast journalism. The college officially opened on July 1, 2003, but can trace its roots to ECU founding; the school hired art and music professionals in 1907 to train teachers.

The College of Health and Human Performance is made up of eight academic units and handles all of the recreational and exercise degrees at East Carolina University. It took on its name in 2003, but traces its legacy to the Department of Physical Education in 1930. It was the 1930 East Carolina Teachers College Planning Document number two priority. In 1938, the Department of Physical Education was established and Physical education became a specialty area for high school teachers.

The College of Engineering and Technology comprises four departments. The college offers nine degrees including engineering, computer science, construction management, design, distribution and logistics, industrial engineering technology, information and computer technology, and industrial technology.

The College of Allied Health Sciences offers 25 degree and certificate programs in health science disciplines primarily associated with health maintenance and rehabilitative services. The college comprises eight departments: Addictions and Rehabilitation Studies (addiction, clinical, and mental health counseling), Clinical Laboratory Sciences, Communication Sciences and Disorders (Audiology and Speech-Language Pathology), Health Services and Information Management, Nutrition Science, Occupational Therapy, Physical Therapy, and Physician Assistant Studies. Bachelor of Science, Master of Science, Doctor of Audiology (AuD), Doctor of Occupational Therapy (OTD) Doctor of Physical Therapy (DPT), and PhD degrees are offered. Established in the 1967–68 school year as the School of Allied Health and Social Professions, the College of Allied Health Sciences is now located in the Allied Health Sciences building on the Health Sciences Campus and is the largest allied health college in the state.

The College of Nursing is a professional school that offers one undergraduate degree, Bachelor of Science in Nursing. The school was created in 1959 and now offers Bachelor of Science, Masters, and Ph.D programs. The college has over 100 faculty teaching the students everything about the nursing field while practicing in the under-served Eastern North Carolina. There are three departments within this school: Department of Undergraduate Nursing Science Junior Division, Department of Undergraduate Nursing Science Senior Division, and the Department of Graduate Nursing Science. On October 12, 2007, the University of North Carolina Board of Governors permitted the re–designation of the School of Nursing to the College of Nursing. The National League for Nursing named the college a Center of Excellence. The college produces more nurses than any other school in the Mid-Atlantic region.

The Graduate School consist of 85 master's degree, 21 doctoral programs and 62 certificates. It coordinates the graduate offerings of all departments in the nine colleges. The School also runs the non–professional degree programs of the professional School of Medicine. The school offers 17 master's degree in Accounting, Arts, Business Administration, Construction Management, Education, Environmental Health, Fine Arts, Library Science, Music, Nursing, Occupational Therapy, Public Administration, Public Health, School AdministrationScience, Social Work and Teaching. It also offers four doctoral degrees in Audiology, Education, Philosophy, and Physical Therapy.

The School of Dental Medicine is a professional school at the university. The school graduates one degree, Doctor of Dental Medicine. It also has three residencies in Advanced Education in General Dentistry and Dental General Practice. The school also offers a specialty program in Pedodontics. It was founded on February 24, 2006, at the East Carolina Board of Trustees meeting. The dental school was unanimously approved by the UNC System Board of Governors as well.

=== Rankings ===
Academic rankings

National
- Forbes: 519
- U.S. News & World Report: 194
- Washington Monthly: 70
- WSJ/College Pulse: 500

Global
- THE: 801–1000
- U.S. News & World Report: 1023

Chancellor Ballard accepting the 2010 Secretary of Defense Employer Support Freedom Award

In 2016, East Carolina was classified by U.S. News & World Report as a National University in its Top-tier rankings. In 2010, Forbes ranked the school 36th in its America's Best College Buys story.

In the 2012 edition of U.S. News & World Report, The Brody School of Medicine is ranked 10th in the country for primary care physician preparation, 13th in the rural medicine specialty and 14th in family medicine. In 2010, Brody was ranked seventh on the social mission scale.

In 2009, the university was awarded the Patriot Award. The Patriot Award recognizes employers who go above and beyond what the law requires in supporting their employees who serve in the National Guard or reserves. In 2010, the university was awarded the Secretary of Defense Employer Support Freedom Award. It is the highest recognition given by the U.S. Government to employers for their outstanding support of their employees who serve in the Guard and Reserve.

In 2024, Washington Monthly ranked East Carolina 70th among 438 national universities in the U.S. based on East Carolina's contribution to the public good, as measured by social mobility, research, and promoting public service.

== Research ==
Randolph Chitwood, a cardiothoracic surgeon with East Carolina, performed the first minimally invasive robotic-assisted mitral-valve heart surgery in the United States. East Carolina researchers also developed an electronic fluency device called SpeechEasy; the device is designed to improve the fluency of a person who stutters by changing the sound of the user's voice in his or her ear. Walter Pories, a faculty member at The Brody School of Medicine developed the standard procedure for gastric bypass surgery. Researchers here also first discovered that 80% of obese/type 2 diabetic patients who underwent this surgical procedure had a reversal of the disease. The Biofeedback Lab is currently developing techniques to help service members recover from posttraumatic stress disorders and traumatic brain injuries they received in Afghanistan and Iraq. The in vitro fertilization program is ranked first in North Carolina and fourth overall in the United States. Jason Bond, a former scientist in the Department of Biology, discovered many new species of spiders, including Myrmekiaphila neilyoungi and Aptostichus stephencolberti.

During an archaeological dig on Hatteras Island in 1998, archaeologists discovered a 10-carat gold English signet ring from the 16th century, among other artifacts. The discovered ring was the first material connection between The Lost Colony on Roanoke Island and the Algonquian peoples on Croatan Island. In 2011, underwater archaeologists raised the anchors of the Queen Anne's Revenge, the flagship vessel of Blackbeard, near Beaufort.

=== Libraries ===
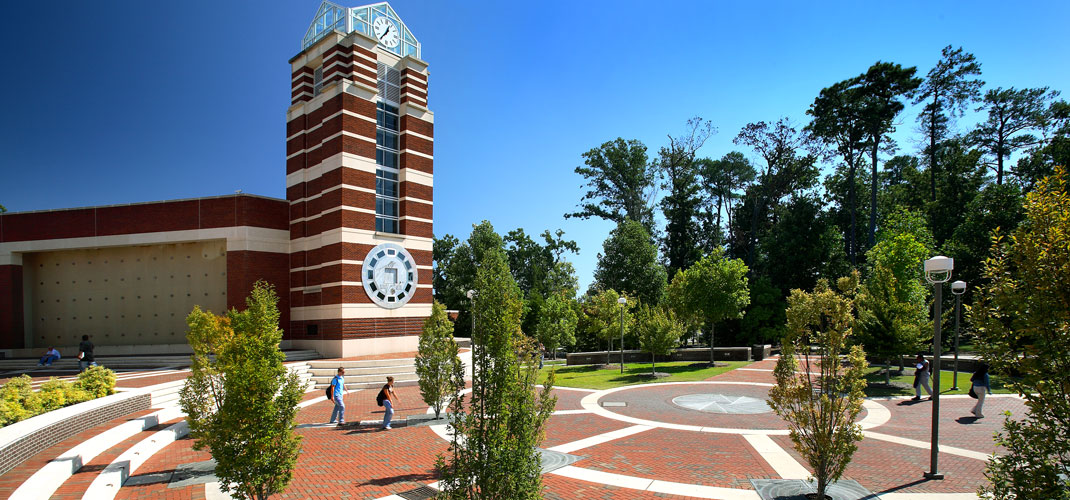
Joyner Library clock tower

J.Y. Joyner Library is the main library located beside the Mall on the main campus. It holds nearly 1.9 million bound volumes, 2.1 million pieces of microform, 532,000 government documents, and more than 24,000 journal subscriptions. The library, which houses the East Carolina manuscript collection, is the largest library east of Raleigh. It is one of the leading repositories in the nation for modern naval and maritime history. It also holds materials related to North Carolina, the tobacco industry, worldwide missionary activities, and American military history. The library is the official repository of the records of the United States Coast Guard Auxiliary. The J. Edgar Hoover Collection on International Communism contains many items dealing with communism worldwide. The Rare Book Collections has items dating from 1589, including a 1733 Edward Moseley map, the first to comprehensively map the colony of North Carolina and the only original copy in the United States.

The Music Library is a branch of Joyner Library located on the first floor of A.J. Fletcher Music Center. It houses approximately 93,000 items, including the entire audio recording collection. It is the largest music collection east of Raleigh. The primary users of the library are faculty and students within the School of Music and the School of Theatre and Dance, but anyone can use its resources. It began in the 1958–59 academic year when a small library was created. Today a staff of five oversee the library duties.

The William E. Laupus Library is the medical and health library for East Carolina. It is the primary library for the Brody School of Medicine, the College of Nursing, the College of Allied Health Sciences, and the School of Dental Medicine. It holds approximately 160,000 volumes (print and non–print) and 10,000 current print, non–print, and electronic serial titles. In 2006, it moved to the Health Sciences Building on the Health Sciences campus. The library is named for Dr. Laupus, a former Dean of Brody School of Medicine.

== Student life ==
Undergraduate demographics as of Fall 2023
Race and ethnicity	Total
White	63%
Black	16%
Hispanic	10%
Two or more races	4%
Asian	3%
Unknown	3%
International student	1%
Economic diversity
Low-income (Note: The percentage of students who received an income-based federal Pell grant intended for low-income students.)	33%
Affluent (Note: The percentage of students who are a part of the American middle class at the bare minimum.)	67%

=== Diversity ===
The EDC Mini-grant Project-The Office of Equity, Diversity, and Community Relations developed this project to improve East Carolina University's number of diversity studies, programs, and groups. This project intends to supply resources and funds towards diversity proposals offered by students, campus organizations, faculty, and staff. These programs include monitoring cultural awareness educational seminars, to improve departmental climate, to recruit diverse students, for research for curriculum improvement, among others. ECU is also home to many diversity initiatives. Under this umbrella is the Center for Leadership and Civic Engagement, the Dr. Jesse R. Peel LGBTQ Center, the Ledonia Wright Cultural Center, Student Veteran Services, and the Women and Gender Office.

=== Student government ===
The Student Government Association at East Carolina University serves the student voice and represents student concerns to a variety of sources including campus administration and other departments.

=== Greek life ===
There are roughly ten social sororities and twice as many fraternities at the East Carolina Campus. Among them are historically African American sororities and fraternities.

=== Athletics ===
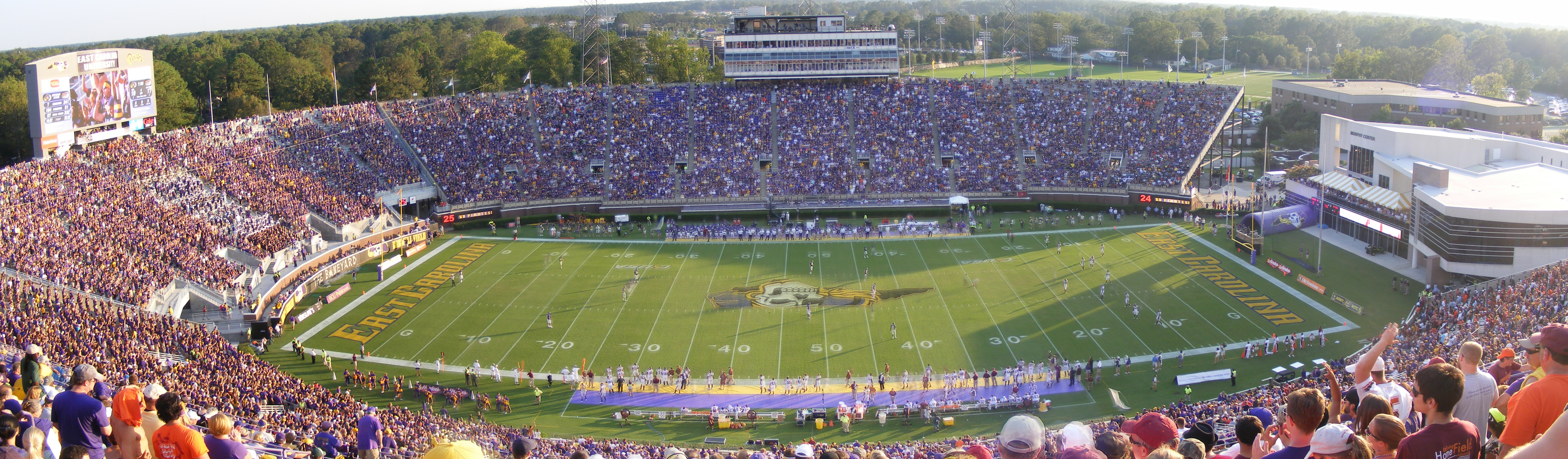
Dowdy-Ficklen Stadium

ECU's sports teams, nicknamed the Pirates, compete in NCAA Division FBS as a full–member of the American Conference (The American). The Pirates joined The American on July 1, 2014. Jon Gilbert is the current athletic director. The football team is supported by world-class spirit groups, such as the East Carolina University Marching Pirates, National Award-winning Cheerleading squads, and spirit teams. Facilities include the 50,000-seat Dowdy–Ficklen Stadium for football, the 8,000-seat Williams Arena at Minges Coliseum for men's and women's basketball, and Clark-LeClair Stadium, with a seating capacity of 3,000 (max capacity of 6,000+ when including outfield "Jungle" areas) for baseball. The Ward Sports Medicine building comprises 82,095-square-foot (7,600 m^{2}) and houses the athletic department, Pirate Club offices and the Human Performance Laboratory. Athletes train in the Murphy Center a 52,475-square-foot (4,875 m^{2}) edifice, housing the strength and conditioning facilities, along with banquet rooms, sport memorabilia, and an academic enhancement center. The Murphy Center was built for approximately $13 million and opened its doors to ECU student–athletes in June 2002.

=== Student newspaper ===
The East Carolinian is the school's student newspaper and dates back to 1925. The ECU Student Media Board "provides oversight and direction to the student newspaper." It started as a weekly but went semi-weekly (Tuesdays and Fridays) in 1953.

== Songs ==
"Hail to Thy Name So Fair" is the alma mater at East Carolina University. It first appeared in the 1940–41 East Carolina Teachers College Student Handbook. It was written by Harold A. McDougle ('44) who became a part-time instructor in the Music Department from 1946 to 1947. The Marching Pirates perform the song during all home football and basketball games. At every home football game, after the national anthem is played by the band, the Alma Mater is played followed by the E.C. Victory song. At the end of football games, the football team walks to the student section to sing the Alma Mater and E.C. Victory song in unison.

== Notable alumni ==
Pirate graduates have been influential in teaching, business, and the arts. Nia Imani Franklin, American composer and beauty pageant titleholder, who graduated in 2015, was crowned Miss New York and Miss America 2019. Actresses Sandra Bullock, Emily Procter, Beth Grant, and screenwriter Kevin Williamson, creator of Scream and Dawson's Creek, graduated from East Carolina. Marcus Crandell (born June 1, 1974, in Charlotte, North Carolina) is a former quarterback and current coach in professional Canadian football. Other graduates include journalists Rick Atkinson and Dan Neil; both received Pulitzer Prizes. Ron Clark, a teacher, author, and founder of the Ron Clark Academy in Atlanta, Georgia. James Maynard graduated with a degree in psychology and founded the Golden Corral restaurant chain. Kelly King is the current chief executive officer for BB&T and graduated with an undergraduate degree in business accounting and a master's of business administration. Former Jacksonville Jaguars quarterback David Garrard attended where he majored in Construction Management. Chris Johnson was drafted by the Tennessee Titans in the first round of the 2008 NFL draft. WWE Chairman and CEO Vince McMahon and his wife Linda McMahon both graduated with a degree in business administration as well. Scott Avett of the folk-rock band The Avett Brothers earned degrees in 1999 and 2000. Henry "Gizmo" Williams, Canadian Football League inductee, graduated from East Carolina University. Les Strayhorn went on to play for the Dallas Cowboys and the Canadian Football League. Cleveland Guardians pitcher, Gavin Williams also attended the university.
