= USS Sutton =

Destroyer escort ship name

USS Sutton has been the name of more than one United States Navy ship, and may refer to:

- USS Sutton (DE-286), a destroyer escort cancelled in 1944
- USS Sutton (DE-771), a destroyer escort in commission from 1944 to 1947
