= U234 =

U234 or U-234 may refer to:

- German submarine U-234, a German Type X submarine used in World War II
- Uranium-234 (U-234 or ^{234}U), an isotope of uranium
