= SS Bärenfels =

SS Bärenfels is the name of the following ships built for DDG Hansa:

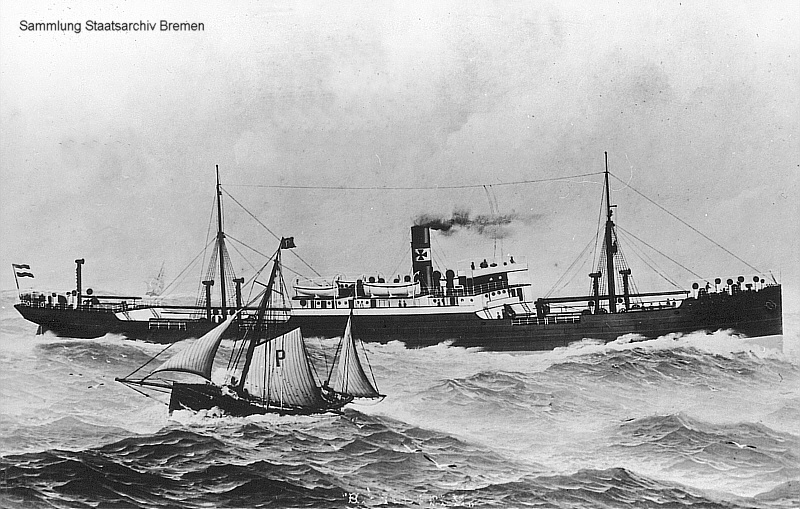
SS Bärenfels (1898)

- SS Bärenfels (1898), captured by the British and sunk in 1916 by SM UB-43
- SS Bärenfels (1921), sunk several times during WWII
