= Ulrich Mohr =

German naval officer

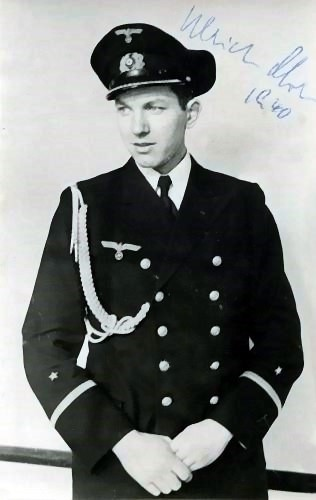
- Ulrich Mohr in 1940
- Occupation: Kriegsmarine officer
- Known for: Service on the German auxiliary cruiser Atlantis during the Second World War; Joint author of Atlantis: The story of the German surface raider (1955)

Ulrich Mohr was a German naval officer and the adjutant (first officer) on the Kriegsmarine auxiliary cruiser Atlantis during the Second World War, where one of his functions was to board captured ships and search for secret papers that might be of use to the German war effort.

In November 1940, Atlantis captured the merchant ship Automedon, and Mohr led the search party that found a secret British report that revealed that they would not be able to hold Hong Kong, Singapore and Malaya if they were attacked by the Japanese. The captain of Atlantis, Bernhard Rogge, sent the documents to his superiors who gave a summary to the Japanese. Historians have speculated that the knowledge of the weak British defences in Asia may have emboldened the Japanese to invade Singapore and played a part in the development of the war in the Pacific.

In 1944, Mohr published an account of the raiding career of Atlantis titled Die Kriegsfahrt Des Hilfskreuzers Atlantis, and in 1955 he published Atlantis: The story of the German surface raider in conjunction with Arthur Sellwood.

== Early life ==
Ulrich Mohr's father was an officer in the German navy. In his early life, Ulrich travelled to Japan, China, and the United States, so that he spoke English with an American accent. He earned the degree of Doctor of Philosophy.

== Military career ==
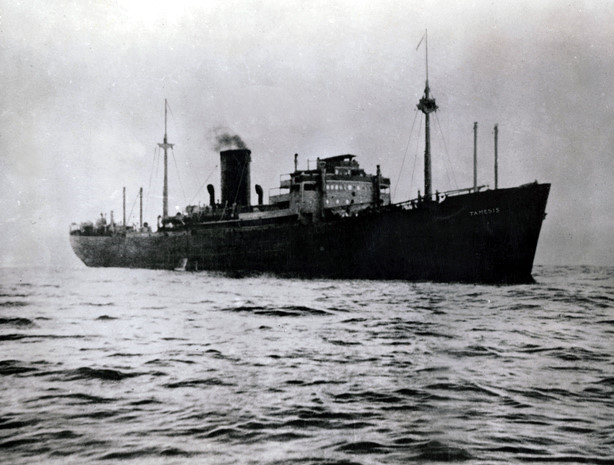
Atlantis disguised as Tamesis, 1940.

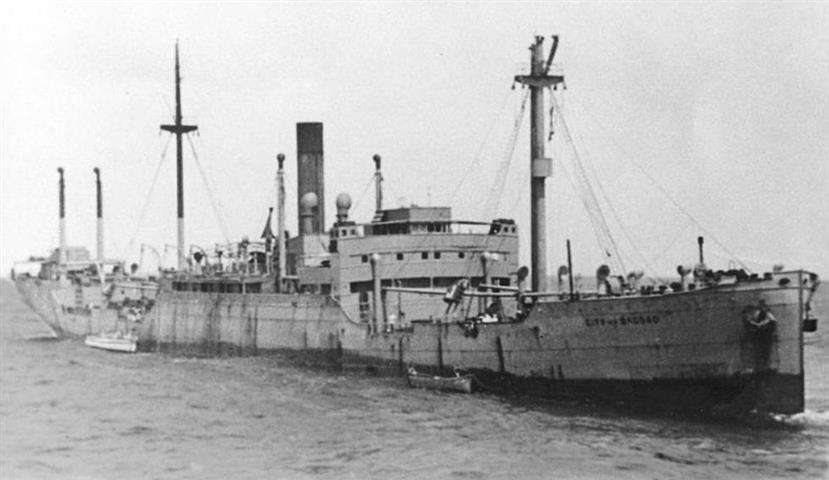
City of Bagdad

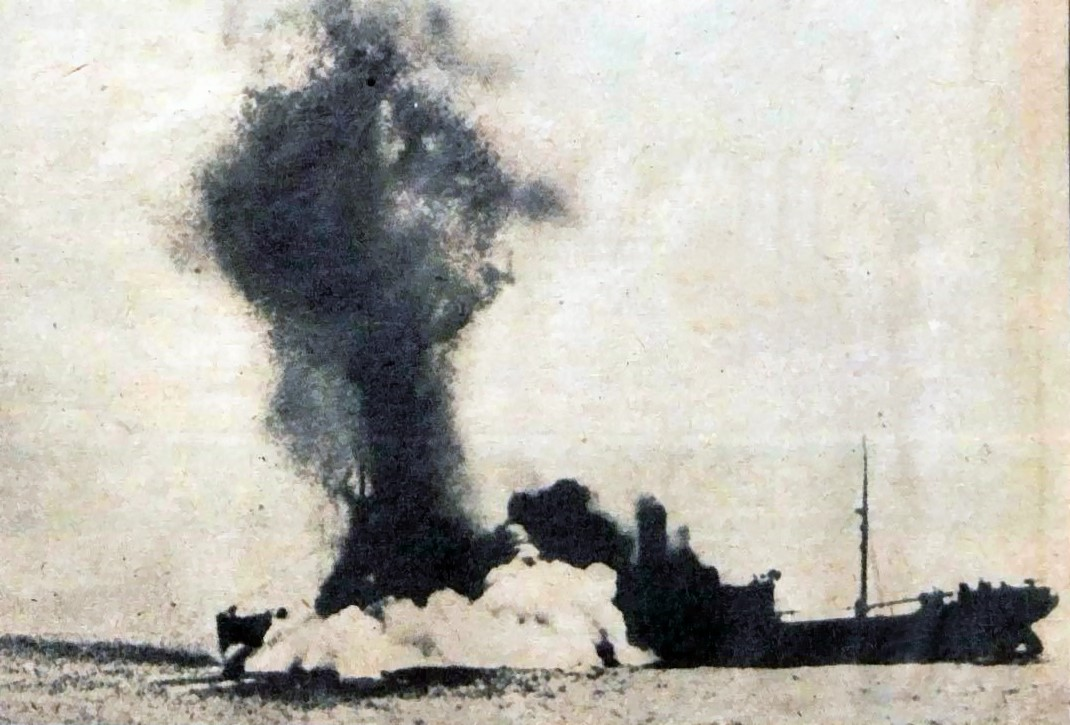
The destruction of the British ship Kemmendine by Atlantis, July 1940.

Mohr's early military career was in minesweeping, but he used his father's connections to get a transfer to something more adventurous. That was the German auxiliary cruiser Atlantis (Ship 16), a merchant raider captained by Bernhard Rogge, on which Mohr took up the position of adjutant (first officer) to replace a professor of the history of art whom Rogge thought better suited to duties on dry land.

Mohr served on Atlantis for the whole of her time at sea since leaving Germany in March 1940 until she was sunk in November 1941, during which time she sank or captured 22 Allied ships and travelled 112,500 miles (181,100 km) without putting into port. It was part of Mohr's duties to board captured vessels and recover documents such as dispatches and code books that might assist the German war effort.

Among the ships he boarded were Scientist; City of Bagdad, where he found Captain White in his cabin attempting to destroy documents; and Ole Jakob, which he approached on Atlantis's boat disguised in a British navy uniform. In November 1940, he boarded the merchant ship Automedon on which he was met by the first mate, all the officers having been killed or injured on the bridge by a shell from Atlantis before they could destroy confidential documents. The survivors were unable to throw the documents overboard as the key to the strong room had been lost in the shelling. The documents were eventually found by the Germans and included a secret British report stating that Britain would not be able to hold Hong Kong, Singapore, Malaya, and other interests in Asia if Japan were to attack them. Captain Rogge forwarded the documents to the German embassy in Tokyo who sent them to Berlin where a summary was communicated to the Japanese. Historians have speculated that the revelation to the Japanese of the weak state of British military power in Asia may have emboldened them to invade Singapore and played a part in the development of the war in the Pacific.

In November 1941, Atlantis was attacked by the British ship HMS Devonshire in the Atlantic and scuttled by her crew after she caught fire. Devonshire did not stop to pick up survivors due to the threat of U-boats in the area. Mohr and the crew eventually made it home after two rescues were launched from Germany using U-boats and surface craft.

In 1944, Mohr published an account of the raiding career of Atlantis titled Die Kriegsfahrt Des Hilfskreuzers Atlantis. Towards the end of the war, he helped to arrange the surrender of Kiel and was a liaison officer between the British and German navies during the disarmament period.

== Post-war life ==
In 1955, Mohr published Atlantis: The story of the German surface raider in conjunction with Arthur Sellwood. The book was published in the United States in 1956 under the title Ship 16: The story of the secret German raider Atlantis and reprinted with that title in the United Kingdom by Amberley Publishing in 2008.

== Publications ==
- Die Kriegsfahrt Des Hilfskreuzers Atlantis. Verlag die Heimbücherei John Jahr, Berlin, 1944.
- Atlantis: The story of the German surface raider. Werner Laurie, London, 1955. (With A. V. Sellwood)
- Ship 16: The story of the secret German raider Atlantis. John Day, New York, 1956. (Reprinted by Amberley Publishing, Stroud, 2008. ISBN 9781848681156)

== See also ==
- Cruiser rules
