= Segal Al Rikabi =

Iraqi poet

- Born: 1950 (age 75–76); Karbala, Iraq
- Education: Baghdad University, University of Reading
- Occupations: Poet, cell biologist, and academic

Segal Abdulwahab Rikabi (Note: Rikabi's name has a variety of translations from Arabic to English, for example Sijal al-Rikabe.) an Iraqi poet, was born in Karbala and grew up in Baghdad. She graduated from University of Baghdad in 1980 and got her PhD in the field of Microbiology and Cytology from the University of Reading. Rikabi studied in the Universities of Basra, Mostanseria, and Baghdad for years. Then, she started publishing her poems in 2013 and had anthologies of poems, which impressed authors and critics inside and outside her country as a prominent poet.

== Biography ==
Sejal Abdulwahab Rikabi was born in Karbala where she finished primary and preparatory schools and grew up in Baghdad. She got her PhD in the field of sciences from Britain in 1980. After that, she returned to her homeland, taught and did research at the university. At the University of Reading, she studied Microbiology and Cytology, and her major was in the field of Cellular biology. Afterwards, she worked at the University of Baghdad, and she was chosen as the assisting cultural consultant in Australia from 1981 until 1986 then at the University of Mostanseria in Basra from 2007 to 2010, she worked as an emeritus professor at the University of Southern Queensland.

== Literature career ==
Rikabi is a member of many scientific associations, as well as, the international writers union. During her educational years, she met many great Arab and non- Arab poets. She started publishing in 2013, and throughout the decade of 2010, she published her anthologies of poems “An Iraqi woman’s enchants”, that included over 77 poetic enchants, “Towards the Palm Orchard” that included over 91 prose texts, “The Moon never came out”. Furthermore, she participated with Arab poets in two anthologies of poems. Due to the influence of nature upon her, she wrote some English glimpses, similarly some of her poems were translated in English and Kurdi. In addition, she had certain interest in nature and the beauty of its symbolism that let it a path towards the nature of passion about existence. According to the critic, Ismaiel Ibraheem Abdou, she managed to set herself among the list of the major keys of writing that exceeds beyond her skies, lands and dreams. Since both individual and collective, alongside her passion about her poetic creations, the poet attracted our thoughts with her poems aiming at making a special impact throughout her artwork production, especially her pursuit after it^{7}. Further, she was described as “Creation, the universe, the awareness, being overwhelmed by the upcoming, restoring situations of yesterday and today and what might be attached thereto towards tomorrow, and she mixed the reality with the romanticism”.

Rikabi recited one of her poems for City of Bagdad, a UNESCO city of literature, for World Poetry Day 2019.

== Publications ==
=== Scientific ===
- The Ultra structural studies of Oogonial walls in Saprolegniadeae, 1979.
- The Biology of the cell, a university textbook, 1986.

=== Poetry ===
- The Moon never came out. 2004. ISBN 9786140112445. OCLC 962141090.
- Towards the Palm Orchard. 2013. ISBN 9786140208827.
- An Iraqi woman's enchants. 2013. ISBN 9786140241282.
- Roses Cry and Gunpowder Smiles. 2016.
- Here are my wings. 2017.
- From the Clearance of Ashes. 2019.
