= Johann-Heinrich Fehler =

German military commander (1910–1993)

Johann Henrich Fehler
- Born: September 20, 1910; Berlin, German Empire
- Died: May 15, 1993 (aged 82)
- Allegiance: Germany
- Branch: Kriegsmarine
- Rank: Kapitanleutnant
- Commands: U-234
- Awards: German Cross in Gold; Iron Cross First Class

Johann-Heinrich Fehler (20 September 1910 – 15 May 1993) was the commander of German submarine U-234 in World War II. He was in-charge of U-234's first and only mission into enemy or contested territory, the attempted delivery of uranium oxide and German advanced weapons technology to the Empire of Japan. He previously served on the commerce raider Atlantis. In 1956 he published his memoirs in London with Arthur V. Sellwood, as Dynamite for Hire: The story of Hein Fehler. They were republished in 1972 as a Tandem paperback titled The Warring Seas.

== Decorations ==
- Iron Cross 2nd Class (1940)
- Iron Cross 1st Class (1940)
- Merchant Raider Badge (1941)
- German Cross in Gold (1942)
