= Auxiliary Cruiser Badge =

Auxiliary Cruiser War Badge Kriegsabzeichen für Hilfskreuzer
- design by Wilhelm Ernst Peekhaus
- Type: Badge
- Awarded for: active service in the Kriegsmarine and Merchant Navy
- Presented by: Nazi Germany
- Eligibility: Military personnel
- Campaign: World War II
- Status: Obsolete
- Established: 24 April 1941

The Auxiliary Cruiser War Badge (German: Kriegsabzeichen für Hilfskreuzer) was a World War II German military decoration awarded to officers and men of the Kriegsmarine for service on Auxiliary Cruisers or the supply ships that supported them for a successful large voyage. The award was instituted on 24 April 1941 by Grand Admiral Erich Raeder.

== Design ==
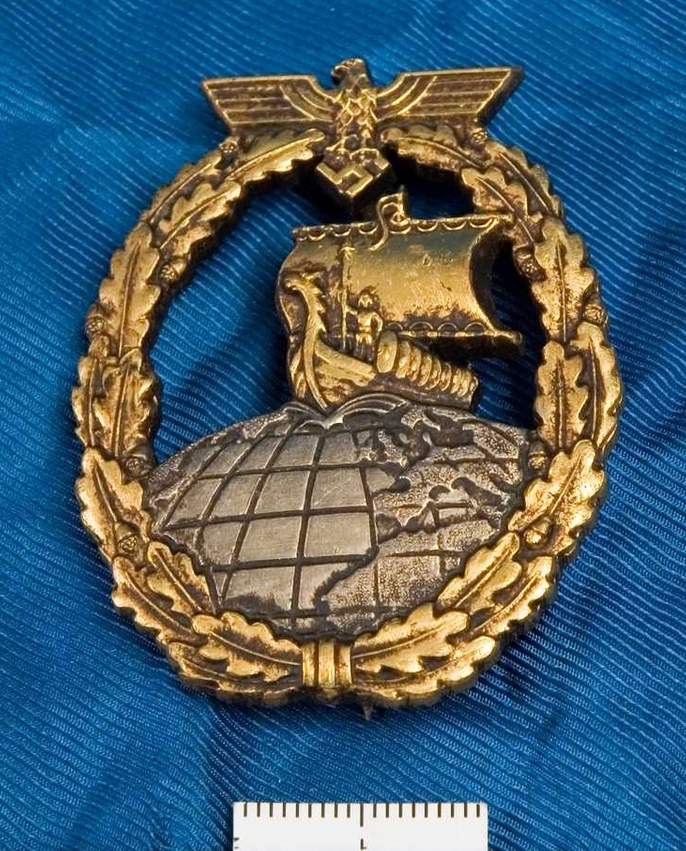
Reproduction of Auxiliary Cruiser Badge. Photo from the Swedish Army Museum

Designed by Wilhelm Ernst Peekhaus in Berlin, the award featured a Viking longship sailing over the northern hemisphere of the globe surrounded by a laurel wreath of oak leaves. At the apex of the badge was a German Eagle clutching a swastika. The wreath, eagle and ship were in gilt and the globe area gray coloured. Versions were produced in bronze and later in zinc.

A special presentation version, featuring 15 small diamonds inlaid on the swastika, was presented in January 1942 by Grand Admiral Raeder to Kapitän zur See Bernhard Rogge, commander of the successful German auxiliary cruiser Atlantis.
