= Arthur V. Sellwood =

British journalist and author

- Born: 16 April 1920; Kensington, London, England
- Died: 31 October 1987 (aged 67); Lewes, Sussex, England
- Occupations: Journalist & author
- Spouse: Mary Sellwood
- Writing career
- Language: English
- Genre: Popular history
- Notable work: Atlantis: The story of the German surface raider (1956)

Arthur Victor Sellwood (16 April 1920 – 31 October 1987) was a British journalist and author who specialised in twentieth century naval history, adapting the recollections of Second World War naval officers into popular history books. He co-authored the story of the German merchant raider Atlantis with that ship's adjutant Ulrich Mohr as well as "Hein" Fehler's account of the voyage of German submarine U-234 and T. J. Cain's story of service on H.M.S. Electra.

He wrote a number of other non-fiction works, some with his wife Mary, as well as the novelisation of the MGM film Children of the Damned. His last book, with Mary, was The Victorian Railway Murders for which the Sellwoods got the idea while Mary was working as a journalist soon after the end of the Second World War but which was not published until 1979.

== Early life and family ==
Arthur Sellwood was born in Kensington, London, on 16 April 1920. He married a fellow journalist, Mary, whom he met in court when they were both reporting on a crime story for competing newspapers.

== Career ==
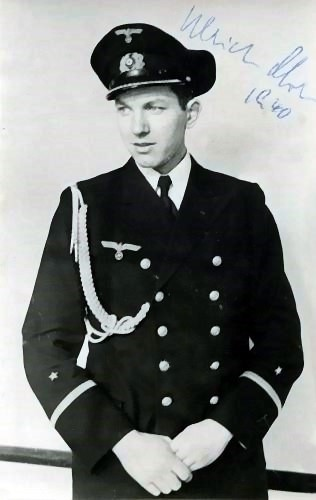
Ulrich Mohr in 1940 whose recollections of service on Atlantis formed Sellwood's first book.

In addition to working as a journalist, Sellwood produced a number of popular non-fiction books, specialising in adapting the recollections of twentieth century naval officers. His first book, published in 1955, was the story of captain Bernhard Rogge's "raider" Atlantis, based on the recollections of that ship's adjutant Ulrich Mohr.

Sellwood's interest in the story of the German "raiders" was kindled after he was asked to review a volume of memoirs of British merchant seamen of the Second World War that included the story of Captain A. Hill of Mandasor, one of the ships sunk by Atlantis. He began to research the history of Atlantis, but by late 1953 was on the point of giving up as the many aliases she used and the patchy nature of the sources made the task too time-consuming for a working journalist. He realised, however, that he could try to write the story from the German side if he could contact anyone who had served on the ship. Just weeks later he happened to meet Captain J. Armstrong White who had been a captive on Atlantis after she sank his ship City of Bagdad and who Sellwood discovered was in contact with Mohr and Rogge. He was thus able to meet Mohr and co-authored the book on Atlantis with him while Rogge published his memoirs separately.

In 1956 he continued the theme with Dynamite for Hire, the story of "Hein" Fehler who also served on Atlantis and as commander of the German submarine U-234, and in 1959 he produced Lt. Commander T. J. Cain's memoir of his service on HMS Electra. In 1973 he published The Damned Don't Drown, an account of the sinking by a Soviet submarine in 1945 of the MV Wilhelm Gustloff. Other military titles were Stand by to Die! (1961) about HMS Li Wo and The Saturday Night Soldiers (1966), a history of the Territorial Army in which Sellwood had served as a rifleman, and of which his father and son had also been members.

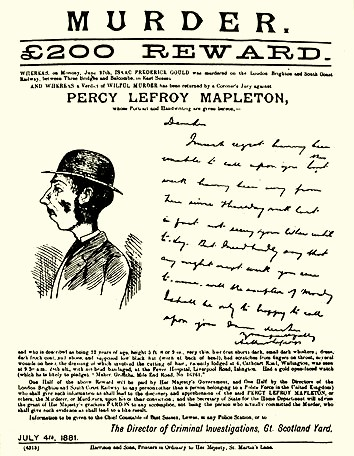
The wanted poster for Percy Lefroy Mapleton who murdered Isaac Gold in 1881 as described in the Sellwood's Victorian Railway Murders (1979)

His other non-fiction works included Black Avalanche (1960) (with Mary), the story of the Knockshinnoch pit disaster, The Red-Gold Flame (1966) about the Irish 1916 Easter Rising, and Police Strike, 1919 (1978). His only fiction book was the novelisation of the MGM film Children of the Damned (1964) for New English Library (NEL)'s Four Square Books, published the same year as the cross-genre Devil Worship in Britain which he wrote with the anthologist and editor at NEL, Peter Haining.

His last book, with Mary, was The Victorian Railway Murders (1979) which told of eight murders with railway connections. Set during the era when trains had sealed compartments without communicating corridors, meaning that murderers and their victims might be confined together between stations, it has been placed by Michael Cook within the genre of "locked room" crime literature. It was conceived just after the end of the Second World War when Mary was sent to interview a Miss Pill, a relative of Isaac Gold who had been murdered on the Brighton line in 1881 by Percy Lefroy Mapleton, but the decision to finally write the book only came after a "violent incident on a night train" in the 1970s. It was republished in 2009 as Death Ride from Fenchurch Street and Other Victorian Railway Murders.

== Death and legacy ==
Sellwood died in Lewes, Sussex, on 31 October 1987. He left an estate not exceeding £70,000. Several of his books remain in print or have received new editions since his death.

== Selected publications ==
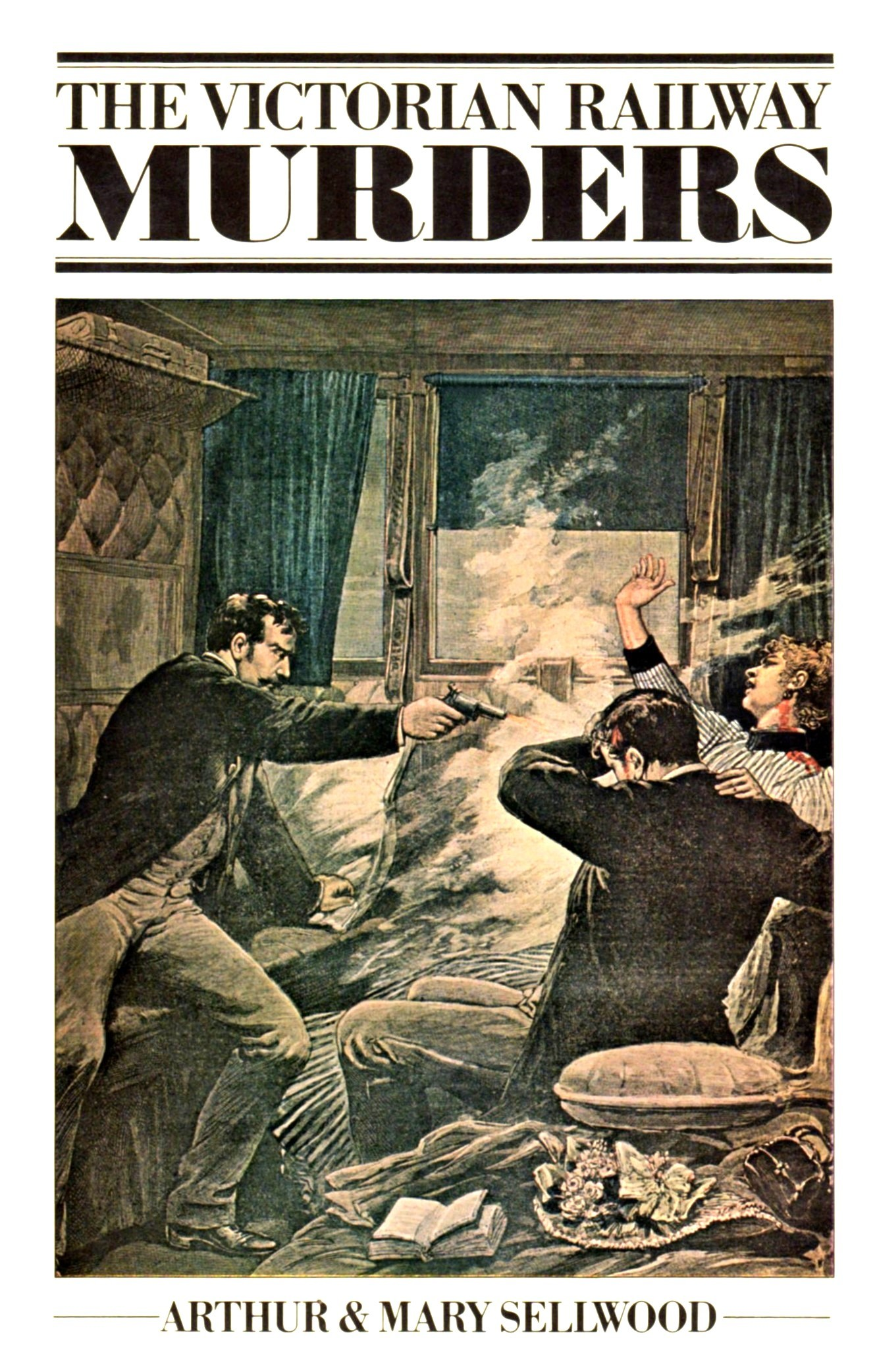
The Victorian Railway Murders (1979)

- Atlantis: The Story of the German Surface Raider. Werner Laurie, 1955. (With Ulrich Mohr) (Published in the United States as Ship 16: The Story of the Secret German Raider Atlantis by John Day, New York, 1956.)
- Dynamite for Hire: The Story of Hein Fehler. Werner Laurie, London, 1956. (Also published as The Warring Seas, 1975)
- H.M.S. Electra. Frederick Muller, London, 1959. (With T. J. Cain)
- Black Avalanche: The Knockshinnoch Pit Disaster. Frederick Muller, London, 1960. (With Mary Sellwood)
- Stand by to Die! Four Square, London, 1961. (Republished as Her Majesty's Ship Li Wo and HMS Li Wo: The most decorated small ship in the navy)
- Children of the Damned. Four Square, London, 1964.
- Devil Worship in Britain. Corgi, London, 1964. (With Peter Haining)
- The Red-Gold Flame. Corgi, London, 1966.
- The Saturday Night Soldiers: The Stirring Story of the Territorial Army. Wolfe Publishing, London, 1966.
- The Damned Don't Drown: The Sinking of the Wilhelm Gustloff. A. Wingate, London, 1973. ISBN 0855230282
- Police Strike, 1919. W.H. Allen, London, 1978. ISBN 0491021534
- The Victorian Railway Murders. David and Charles, Newton Abbot, 1979. (With Mary Sellwood) ISBN 0715376500 (Republished as Death Ride from Fenchurch Street and Other Victorian Railway Murders, Amberley, 2009.)
