= USS Sutton (DE-771) =

Cannon-class destroyer escort

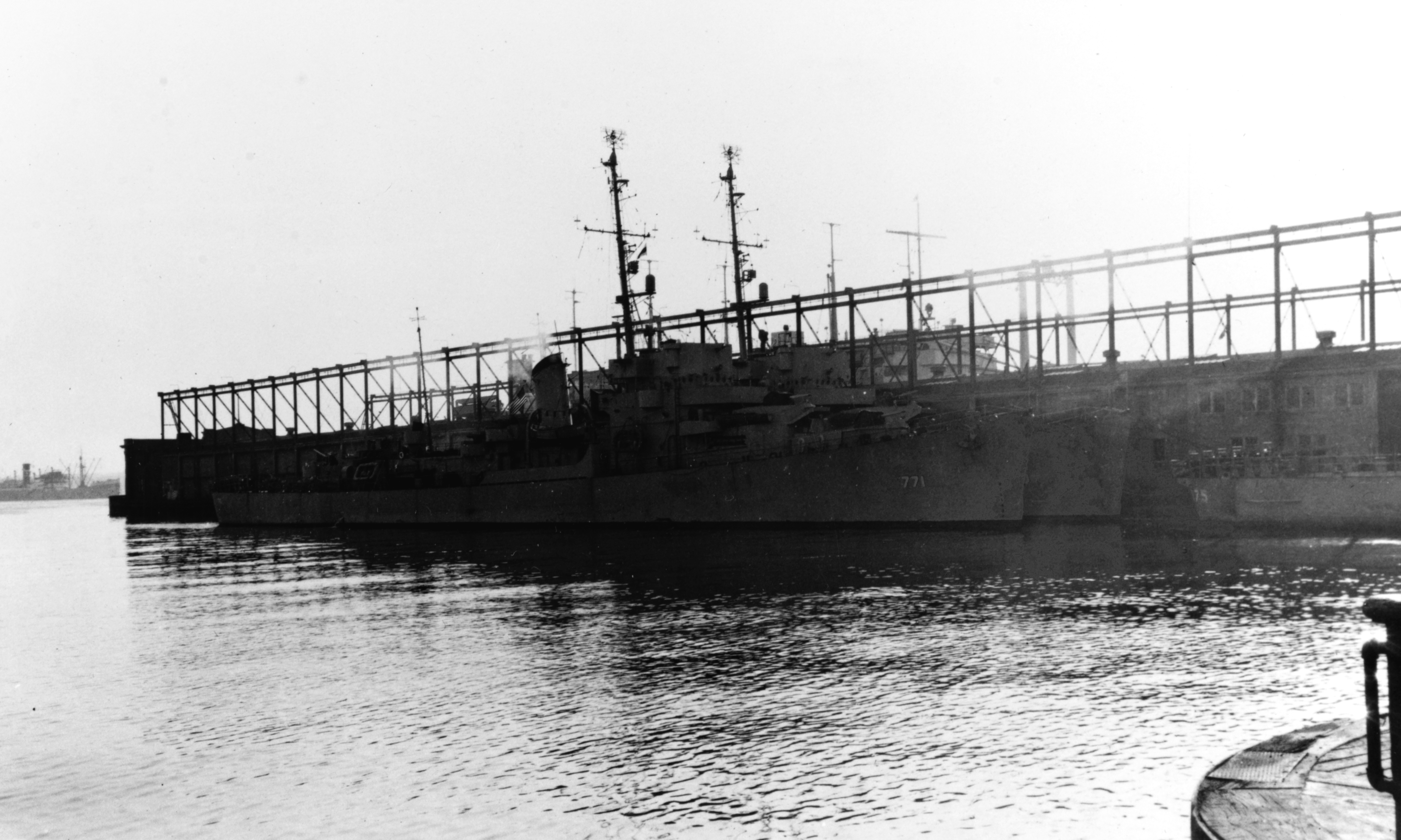

History

United States
- Name: USS Sutton
- Namesake: Shelton B. Sutton, Jr.
- Builder: Tampa Shipbuilding Company, Tampa, Florida
- Laid down: 23 August 1943
- Launched: 6 August 1944
- Commissioned: 22 December 1944
- Decommissioned: 19 March 1948
- Stricken: 15 November 1974
- Fate: Loaned to South Korea, 2 February 1956

South Korea
- Name: ROKS Gangwon
- Acquired: 2 February 1956
- Stricken: 28 December 1977
- Identification: F-72
- Fate: Sent to the Philippines to be cannibalized for spare parts

General characteristics
- Class & type: Cannon-class destroyer escort
- Displacement: 1,240 long tons (1,260 t) standard; 1,620 long tons (1,646 t) full
- Length: 306 ft (93 m) o/a; 300 ft (91 m) w/l
- Beam: 36 ft 10 in (11.23 m)
- Draft: 11 ft 8 in (3.56 m)
- Propulsion: 4 × GM Mod. 16-278A diesel engines with electric drive, 6,000 shp (4,474 kW), 2 screws
- Speed: 21 knots (39 km/h; 24 mph)
- Range: 10,800 nmi (20,000 km) at 12 kn (22 km/h; 14 mph)
- Complement: 15 officers and 201 enlisted
- Armament: 3 × single Mk.22 3"/50 caliber guns; 1 × twin 40 mm Mk.1 AA gun; 8 × 20 mm Mk.4 AA guns; 3 × 21-inch (533 mm) torpedo tubes; 1 × Hedgehog Mk.10 anti-submarine mortar (144 rounds); 8 × Mk.6 depth charge projectors; 2 × Mk.9 depth charge tracks

USS Sutton (DE-771) was a Cannon-class destroyer escort in service with the United States Navy from 1943 to 1948. In 1956, she was transferred to South Korea, where she served as Kang Won (F-72) until 1977. The ship was then cannibalized for spare parts in the Philippines.

== Namesake ==
Shelton B. Sutton Jr. was born on 21 August 1919 in Brewton, Georgia. He was appointed ensign in United States Naval Reserve on 21 April 1941. On 12 February 1942, he was ordered to the 3rd Naval District to await transportation to light cruiser USS Juneau. He reported for duty in the cruiser on 2 March 1942. He was killed in action on 13 November 1942 when Juneau was torpedoed and sunk by an Imperial Japanese Navy submarine during the Naval Battle of Guadalcanal.

The destroyer escort USS Sutton (DE-286) was named for him but its construction was cancelled in 1944.

== History ==
USS Sutton was laid down on 23 August 1943 by the Tampa Shipbuilding Co., Tampa, Florida; launched on 6 August 1944, sponsored by Mrs. Shelton B. Sutton, Sr.; and commissioned on 22 December 1944.

=== United States Navy (1944–1956) ===
After fitting out, Sutton sailed on 12 January 1945 for the Bermuda operating area and held her shakedown there until she headed for Boston, Massachusetts, on 14 February. After yard work at the Boston Navy Yard and training at Casco Bay, Maine, she was assigned to Escort Division (CortDiv) 79 which was attached to Task Group (TG) 22.13 and sailed for Argentia, Newfoundland, on 1 March. The group conducted anti-submarine patrols off Newfoundland from 4 to 22 March when it returned to Casco Bay. Sutton stood out of Casco Bay, on 3 April, with her task group which took station on the north–south antisubmarine barrier patrol.

Sutton and USS Neal A. Scott were relieved of patrol duty on 9 May to intercept the German submarine U-1228 which wished to surrender. They contacted the submarine the next day, and the two ships began escorting it to Casco Bay. However, Sutton was soon detached to accept the surrender of U-234. Sutton met the latter U-boat two days later, and she escorted it towards the United States. On 15 May, she put a 15-man boarding party on the submarine and embarked 37 prisoners. Sutton's destination was changed to Portsmouth, New Hampshire, where she arrived with U-234 on the 19th. The submarine and the prisoners were delivered to a representative of the 1st Naval District. U-234 had left Germany with a cargo bound for Japan of a disassembled Messerschmitt Me 262 jet plane, two Japanese scientists (who both committed suicide upon hearing they would surrender and were buried at sea), and two high ranking German officers, including General der Flieger Ulrich Kessler of the Luftwaffe. While this was enough to create a media sensation, it was decades later before the U.S. government revealed that the submarine also carried a load of uranium oxide produced by the German atomic weapons program bound for a last-ditch Japanese effort. The approximately 550 kg of uranium dioxide was transferred to the Manhattan Project. Sutton steamed on to New York two days later and remained there until early June.

Sutton and CortDiv 79 departed New York for Jacksonville, Florida, on 10 June and arrived on the 14th. Sutton operated out of Mayport, Florida, until 29 August when she sailed for Charleston, South Carolina, and a yard overhaul which lasted all of September. She moved up the coast to Norfolk, Virginia, from 5 to 18 October when she sailed for the Gulf of Mexico. Sutton was at New Orleans, Louisiana, from 23 October to 6 November when she got underway for Norfolk. The escort operated from there until the fall of 1947 when she moved to New York to be inactivated. She was placed in reserve, out of commission, in September 1947 and assigned to the Atlantic Reserve Fleet. In 1948, the destroyer escort was moved to Florida and joined the mothball fleet at Green Cove Springs, Florida.

=== Republic of Korea Navy (1956–1977) ===
Sutton was loaned to the Republic of Korea on 2 February 1956 under the Grant Aid Program and served that government as ROKS Kang Won (F-72) until she was stricken on 28 December 1977 and sent to the Philippines for cannibalization of parts.
