= German submarine U-234 =

German World War II submarine

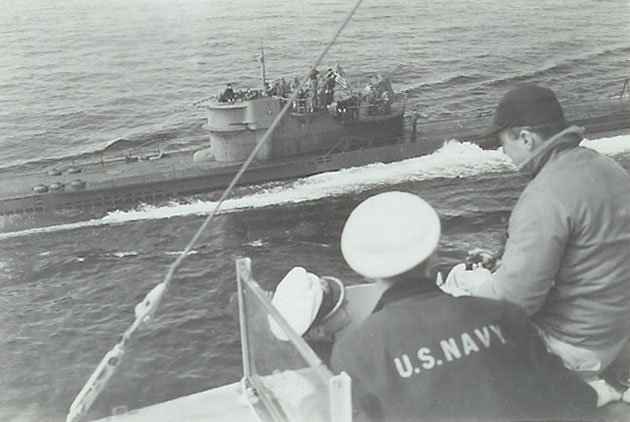
- U-234 surrendering. Crewmen of Sutton (DE-771) in foreground with Kapitänleutnant Johann-Heinrich Fehler (left-hand white cap)

History

Nazi Germany
- Name: U-234
- Ordered: 7 December 1940
- Builder: Germaniawerft, Kiel
- Yard number: 664
- Laid down: 1 October 1941
- Launched: 23 December 1943
- Commissioned: 2 March 1944
- Captured: Surrendered to USS Sutton, 14 May 1945
- Fate: Sunk by torpedo from USS Greenfish during trials, 20 November 1947

General characteristics
- Class & type: Type X submarine minelayer
- Displacement: 1,763 tonnes (1,735 long tons) surfaced; 2,177 tonnes (2,143 long tons) submerged
- Length: 89.80 m (294 ft 7 in) o/a; 70.90 m (232 ft 7 in) pressure hull
- Beam: 9.20 m (30 ft 2 in) o/a; 4.75 m (15 ft 7 in) pressure hull
- Height: 10.20 m (33 ft 6 in)
- Draught: 4.71 m (15 ft 5 in)
- Propulsion: 2 × supercharged GW F 46 a 9 pu 9 cylinder, four-stroke diesel engines, 4,800 PS (4,700 bhp; 3,500 kW); 2 × AEG GU 720/8-287 electric motors, 1,100 PS (1,100 bhp; 810 kW)
- Speed: 16.4–17 knots (30.4–31.5 km/h; 18.9–19.6 mph) surfaced; 7 knots (13 km/h; 8.1 mph) submerged
- Range: 18,450 nautical miles (34,170 km; 21,230 mi) at 10 knots (19 km/h; 12 mph) surfaced; 93 nmi (172 km; 107 mi) at 4 knots (7.4 km/h; 4.6 mph) submerged
- Test depth: Calculated crush depth: 220 m (720 ft)
- Complement: 5 officers, 47 enlisted
- Sensors & processing systems: FuMO-61 Hohentwiel U; FuMB-26 Tunis
- Armament: 2 × 53.3 cm (21 in) stern torpedo tubes; 15 × G7e torpedoes; 66 × SMA mines

Service record
- Part of: 5th U-boat Flotilla; 2 March 1944 - 28 February 1945; 33rd U-boat Flotilla; 1 March 1945 - 8 May 1945
- Identification codes: M 53 388
- Commanders: Kptlt. Johann-Heinrich Fehler; 2 March 1944 - 19 May 1945
- Operations: 1 patrol: 16 April - 19 May 1945
- Victories: None

German submarine U-234 was a Type XB U-boat of Nazi Germany's Kriegsmarine during World War II, she was commanded by Kapitänleutnant Johann-Heinrich Fehler. Her first and only mission into enemy or contested territory consisted of the attempted delivery of uranium oxide and German advanced weapons technology to the Empire of Japan. After receiving the order of Hitler's successor Admiral Dönitz to surface and surrender and of Germany's unconditional surrender, the submarine's crew surrendered to the United States on 14 May 1945.

== Construction ==
Originally built as a minelaying submarine, she was laid down at the Germaniawerft in Kiel on 1 October 1941; U-234 was damaged during construction, but launched on 23 December 1943. Following the loss of U-233 in July 1944, it was decided not to use U-234 as a minelayer; she was completed instead as a long-range cargo submarine with missions to Japan in mind.

== Sensors ==
=== Radar ===
U-234 was one of the few U-boats that was fitted with a FuMO-61 Hohentwiel U-Radar Transmitter. This equipment was installed on the starboard side of the conning tower.

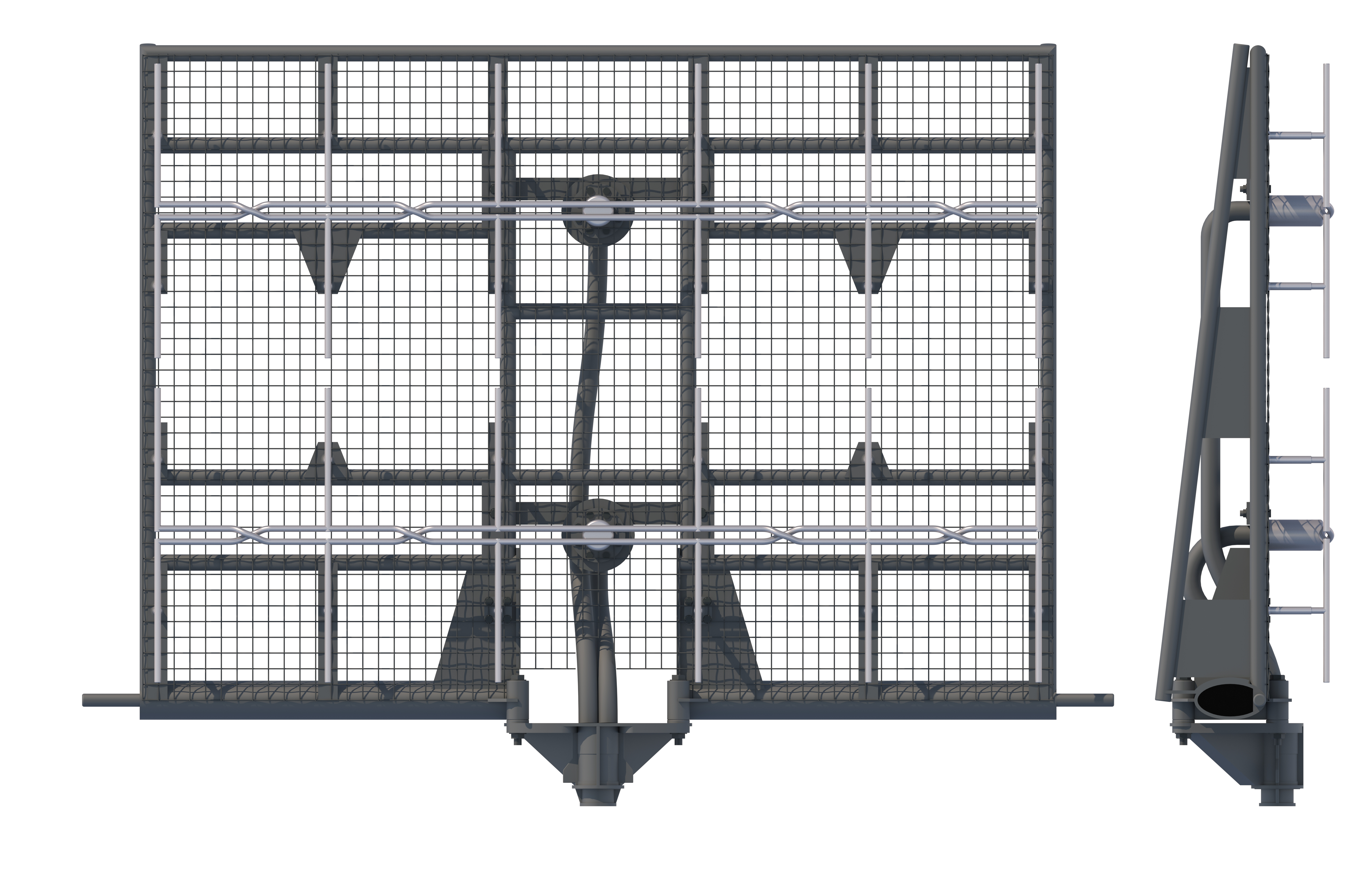
FuMO-61 Hohentwiel U-Radar Transmitter

=== Radar detection ===
U-234 was also fitted with the FuMB-26 Tunis antenna. The FuMB 26 Tunis combined the FuMB Ant. 24 Fliege and FuMB Ant. 25 Cuba II antennas. It could be mounted in either the Direction Finder Antenna Loop or separately on the bridge.

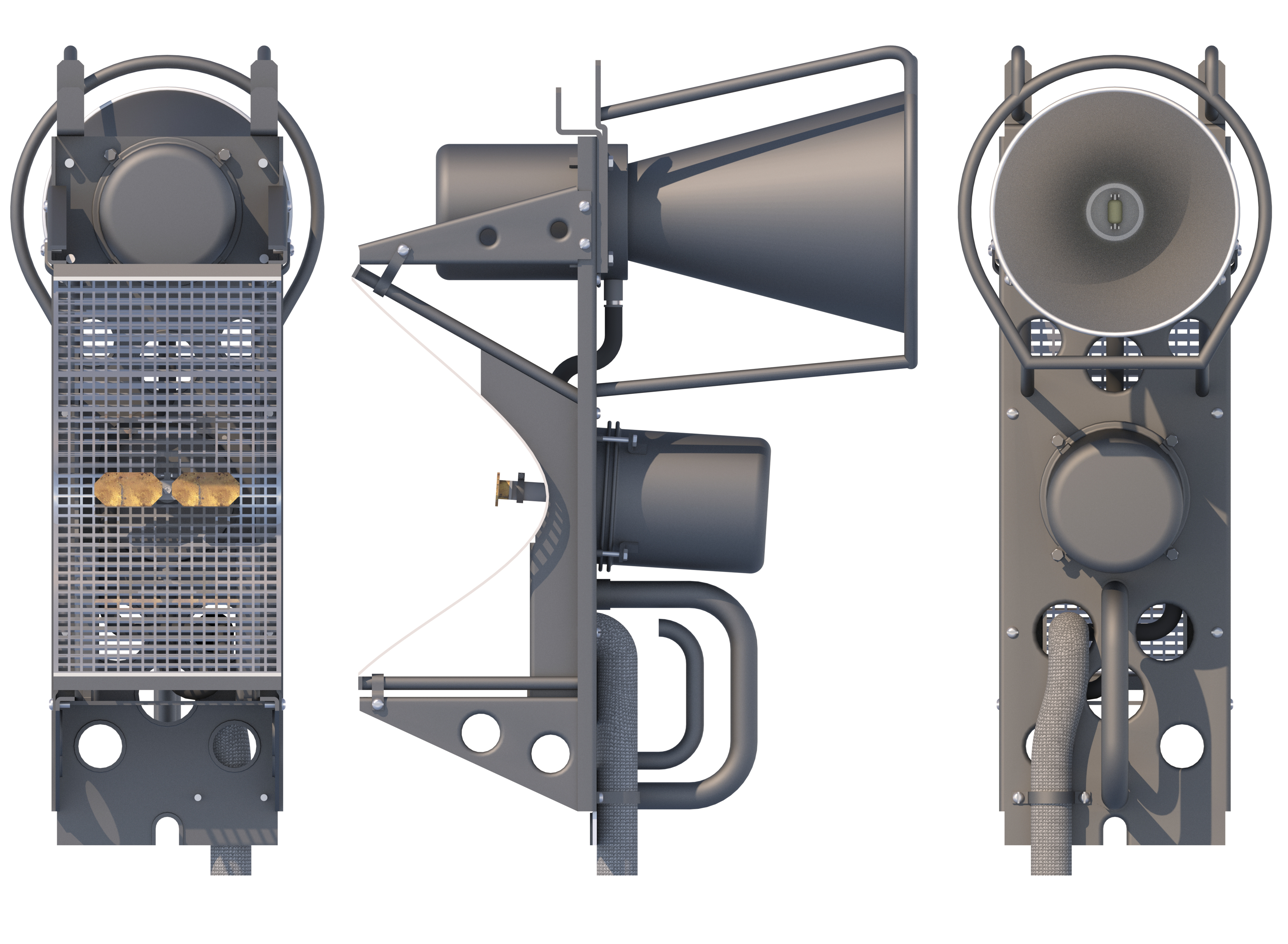
FuMB-26 Tunis Radar Detection

== Wartime service ==
U-234 returned to the Germaniawerft yard at Kiel on 5 September 1944, to be refitted as a transport. Apart from minor work, she had a snorkel added and 12 of her 30 mineshafts were fitted with special cargo containers the same diameter as the shafts and held in place by the mine release mechanisms. In addition, her keel was loaded with cargo, thought to be optical-grade glass and mercury, and her four upper-deck torpedo storage compartments (two on each side) were also occupied by cargo containers.

=== Cargo ===
The cargo to be carried was determined by a special commission, the Marine Sonderdienst Ausland, established towards the end of 1944, at which time the submarine's officers were informed that they were to make a special voyage to Japan. When loading was completed, the submarine's officers estimated that they were carrying 240 tons of cargo plus sufficient diesel fuel and provisions for a six- to nine-month voyage.

The cargo included technical drawings, examples of the newest electric torpedoes, one crated Me 262 jet aircraft, a Henschel Hs 293 glide bomb and what was later listed on the US Unloading Manifest as 550 kg (1,210 lb) of uranium oxide. In the 1997 book Hirschfeld, Wolfgang Hirschfeld reported that he saw about 10 lead cubes with 23 centimetres (9.1 in) sides, and "U-235" painted on each, loaded into the boat's cylindrical mine shafts. According to cable messages sent from the dockyard, these containers held "U-powder".

When the cargo was loaded, U-234 carried out additional trials near Kiel, then returned to the northern German city where her passengers came aboard.

=== Passengers ===
U-234 was carrying twelve passengers, including German general Ulrich Kessler, four German naval officers, civilian engineers and scientists and two Japanese naval officers. Luftwaffe General Ulrich Kessler was to take over Luftwaffe liaison duties in Tokyo; Kay Nieschling, a Naval Fleet Judge Advocate who was to rid the German diplomatic corps in Japan of the remnants of the Richard Sorge spy ring; Heinz Schlicke, a specialist in radar, infrared, and countermeasures and director of the Naval Test Fields in Kiel (later recruited by the US in Operation Paperclip); and August Bringewalde, who was in charge of Me 262 production at Messerschmitt.

The Japanese passengers were Lieutenant Commander Hideo Tomonaga of the Imperial Japanese Navy, a naval architect and submarine designer who had come to Germany in 1943 on the Japanese submarine I-29, and Lieutenant Commander Shoji Genzo, an aircraft specialist and former naval attaché.

=== Voyage ===
U-234 sailed from Kiel for Kristiansand in Norway on the evening of 25 March 1945, accompanied by escort vessels and three Type XXIII coastal U-boats, arriving in Horten Naval Base two days later. The submersible spent the next eight days carrying out trials on her snorkel, during which she accidentally collided with a Type VIIC U-boat performing similar trials. Damage to both submarines was minor, and despite a diving and fuel oil tank being holed, U-234 was able to complete her trials. She then proceeded to Kristiansand, arriving on about 5 April, where she underwent repairs and replenished her provisions and fuel.

U-234 departed Kristiansand for Japan on 15 April 1945, running submerged at snorkel depth for the first 16 days, and surfacing after that only because her commander, Kapitänleutnant Johann-Heinrich Fehler, considered he was safe from attack on the surface in the prevailing severe storm. From then on, she spent two hours running on the surface by night, and the remainder of the time submerged. The voyage proceeded without incident. The first sign that world affairs were overtaking the voyage was when the Kriegsmarine's Goliath transmitter stopped transmitting, soon followed by the Nauen station. Fehler did not know it, but Germany's naval HQ had fallen into Allied hands.

Then, on 4 May, U-234 received a fragment of a broadcast from British and American radio stations announcing that Admiral Karl Dönitz had become Germany's head of state following the death of Adolf Hitler. U-234 surfaced on 10 May for better radio reception and received Dönitz's last order to the submarine force, ordering all U-boats to surface, hoist white flags and surrender to Allied forces. Fehler suspected a trick and managed to contact U-873, whose captain convinced him that the message was authentic.

At this point, the U-boat was almost equidistant from British, Canadian, and U.S. ports. Fehler decided not to continue his journey, and instead headed for the east coast of the United States. Fehler thought it likely that if they surrendered to Canadian or British forces, they would be imprisoned and it could be years before they were returned to Germany; he believed that the United States would probably just send them home.

Fehler consequently decided that he would surrender to U.S. forces, but radioed on 12 May that he intended to sail to Halifax, Nova Scotia, to surrender to ensure Canadian units would not reach him first. U-234 then set course for Newport News, Virginia. During the passage Fehler disposed of his Tunis radar detector, the new Kurier radio communication system, and all Enigma machine-related documents and other classified papers. On learning that the U-boat was to surrender, the two Japanese passengers committed suicide by taking an overdose of Luminal, a barbiturate sedative and antiepileptic drug. They were buried at sea.

== Capture ==
The difference between Kptlt. Fehler's reported course to Halifax and his true course was soon realized by US authorities who dispatched two destroyers to intercept U-234. On 14 May 1945, she was encountered south of the Grand Banks, Newfoundland by USS Sutton. Members of Sutton's crew took command of the U-boat and sailed her to the Portsmouth Naval Shipyard, where U-805, U-873, and U-1228 had already surrendered. Velma Hunt, a retired Penn State University environmental health professor, has suggested U-234 may have put into two ports between her surrender and her arrival at the Portsmouth Navy Yard: once in Newfoundland, to land an American sailor who had been accidentally shot in the buttocks, and again at Casco Bay, Maine. News of U-234's surrender with her high-ranking German passengers made it a major news event. Reporters swarmed over the Navy Yard and went to sea in a small boat for a look at the submarine.

=== Secret cargo ===
Since its capture, the U-234 was treated with unusual secrecy, something noted in the press at the time and attributed to its high-ranking passengers. Even in 1945, rumors circulated that the submarine had contained uranium, but documents about the contents of the cargo, and its fate, remained classified for much of the Cold War.

Various sources, including contemporary documents and later memoirs, cite the uranium contents as being 560 kilograms (1,230 lb) of uranium oxide, separated into ten containers made out of lead and lined with gold. Many of the accounts, however, have inconsistencies and disagree on specifics, as historian Joseph Scalia has documented. Those onboard the boat appear to have been told that the contents were dangerous if opened; it is suspected that, if this was not simply a lie meant to keep them from inspecting them more closely, it may have been related to their potential pyrophoricity. Some have suggested that they did not contain uranium at all, but rather other pyrophoric alloys, or even biological or chemical weapons materials, although these suggestions would be contradicted by all of the other sources.

No serious historian believes that the uranium would have been anything other than un-enriched. While Germany did have a nuclear program during World War II, German, American, and Soviet sources all indicate clearly that Germany lacked the facilities to enrich uranium (or produce any other kinds of fissile material) in production-level quantities. Rather, Scalia documents that the Japanese asked the Germans for the uranium officially for the purpose of research into chemical catalysts for the production of aviation fuel. It may have actually been desired for part of the small Japanese nuclear weapons program, although Japan did not itself have the facilities necessary to weaponize it.

The ultimate disposition of the possible uranium cargo has never been confirmed. Scalia traced its movement after capture from Portsmouth Naval Shipyard to the Indian Head Naval Station, and that it was shipped from there to an unspecified destination in late June 1945. After that, there are conflicting accounts. Major John Lansdale, the former head of Manhattan Project security, said in 1995 that it was then directly sent to Clinton Engineer Works in Oak Ridge, Tennessee, where it was enriched as part of the weapons program. While it has been suggested that perhaps it was enriched and some of it made its way into the Little Boy atomic bomb that was dropped on Hiroshima, it does not appear that there was sufficient time for this to occur, and that, if enriched, it simply became part of the ever-growing postwar American uranium stockpile.

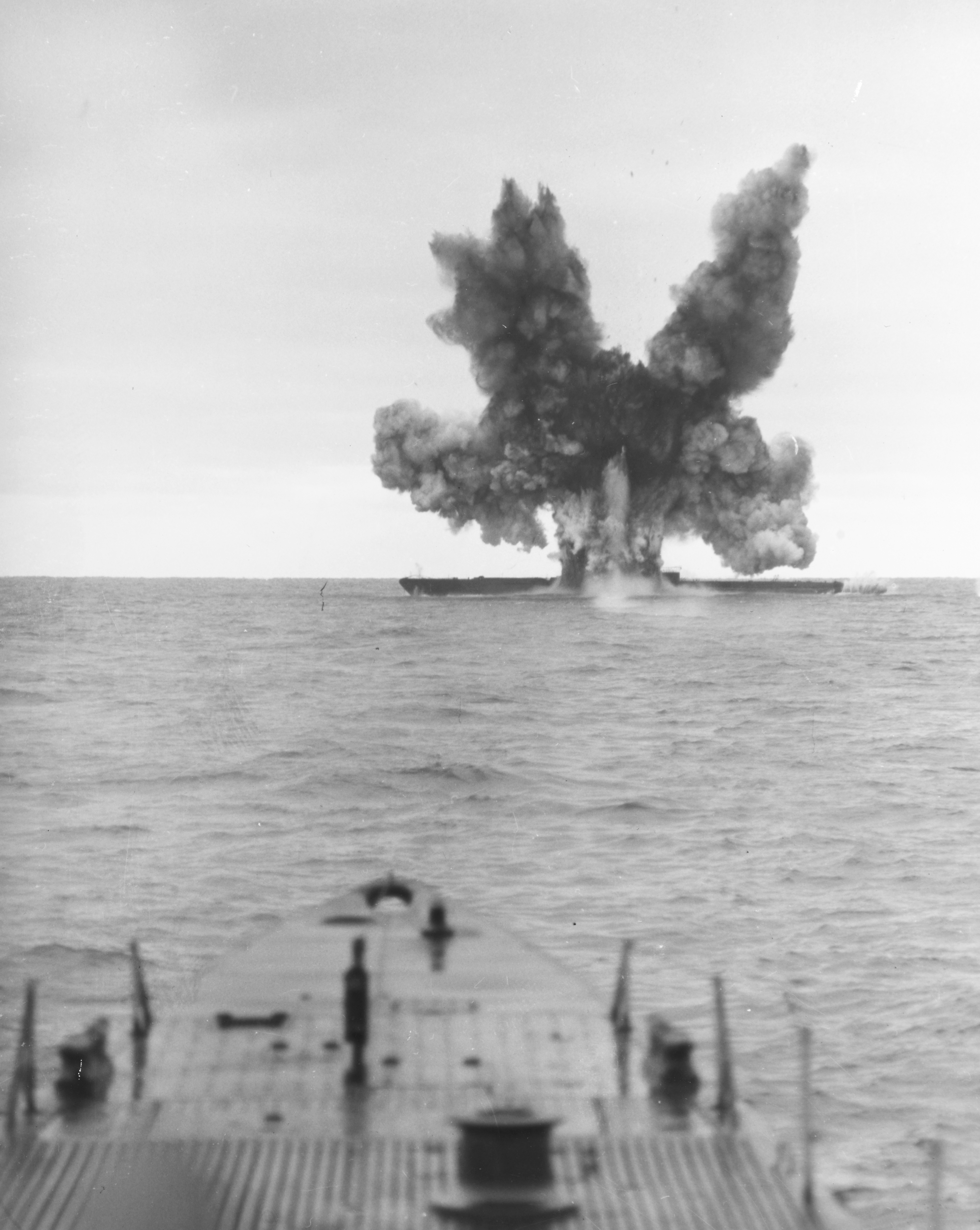
A torpedo from USS Greenfish sinks U-234 off Cape Cod, Massachusetts, in a 1947 training exercise.

== Disposition ==
As she was not needed by the US Navy, U-234 was sunk off 40 miles northeast of Provincetown, Cape Cod as a torpedo target by USS Greenfish on 20 November 1947 at 42°37′N 69°33′W.

== In popular culture ==
- The Last U-Boat, the 1992 film directed by Frank Beyer
- Documentary film, Hitler's Last U-Boat Directed by Andreas Gutzeit International Historical Films, Inc. (2001) ASIN B0000646UH
- Empire and Honor, the last published novel in W.E.B. Griffin's Honor Bound series, features U-234 carrying uranium oxide proceeding not to the United States as happened in real life, but going instead to Argentina, where escaped SS officers take control of the boat and plan to sell its uranium oxide to the Soviet Union.
- Black Lagoon, a currently serialized manga by Rei Hiroe. U-234 is present in chapters 5 through 8. Chapter 5 tells of a fictional sinking by the U.S. Navy near the Nicobar Islands in March of 1945, while heading to Batavia to deliver an incredibly valuable painting commissioned by a high-ranking Sicherheitsdienst officer. However, U-234 is depicted as a Type VIIC (Type IXC in the anime adaptation) instead of the Type XB that it actually was.

== See also ==
- Japanese-German military technology collaboration

== Bibliography ==
- Busch, Rainer; Röll, Hans-Joachim (1999). German U-boat commanders of World War II : a biographical dictionary. Translated by Brooks, Geoffrey. London, Annapolis, Md: Greenhill Books, Naval Institute Press. ISBN 1-55750-186-6.
- Geoffrey Brooks: Hitler's Terror Weapons, Pen & Sword (2002): ISBN 0-85052-896-8
- Gröner, Erich; Jung, Dieter; Maass, Martin (1991). U-boats and Mine Warfare Vessels. German Warships 1815–1945. Vol. 2. Translated by Thomas, Keith; Magowan, Rachel. London: Conway Maritime Press. ISBN 0-85177-593-4.
- Webber, Bert, (1985), "Silent Siege-II, Japanese Attacks On North America In WWII. Webber Research Group. ISBN 0-936738-26-X
- Wolfgang Hirschfeld; Geoffrey Brooks, The Story of a U-Boat NCO 1940-1946 Naval Institute Press (1996) ISBN 1-55750-372-9
- Arthur Naujoks, Lee Nelson "The Last Great Secret of the Third Reich", 2002. Council Press.
- Joseph Mark Scalia, Germany's Last Mission to Japan: The Failed Voyage of U-234 Naval Institute Press (2000) ISBN 1-55750-811-9
- A. V. Sellwood: The Warring Seas, 1955. A biography of the career of U-234 commander Johann Fehler.
- Richard Dean Starr, Tides of Justice, a short story featuring U-234 in The Avenger Chronicles edited by Joe Gentile Moonstone Books (June 2008)
