= City of Bagdad =

British-owned cargo ship sunk in World War II

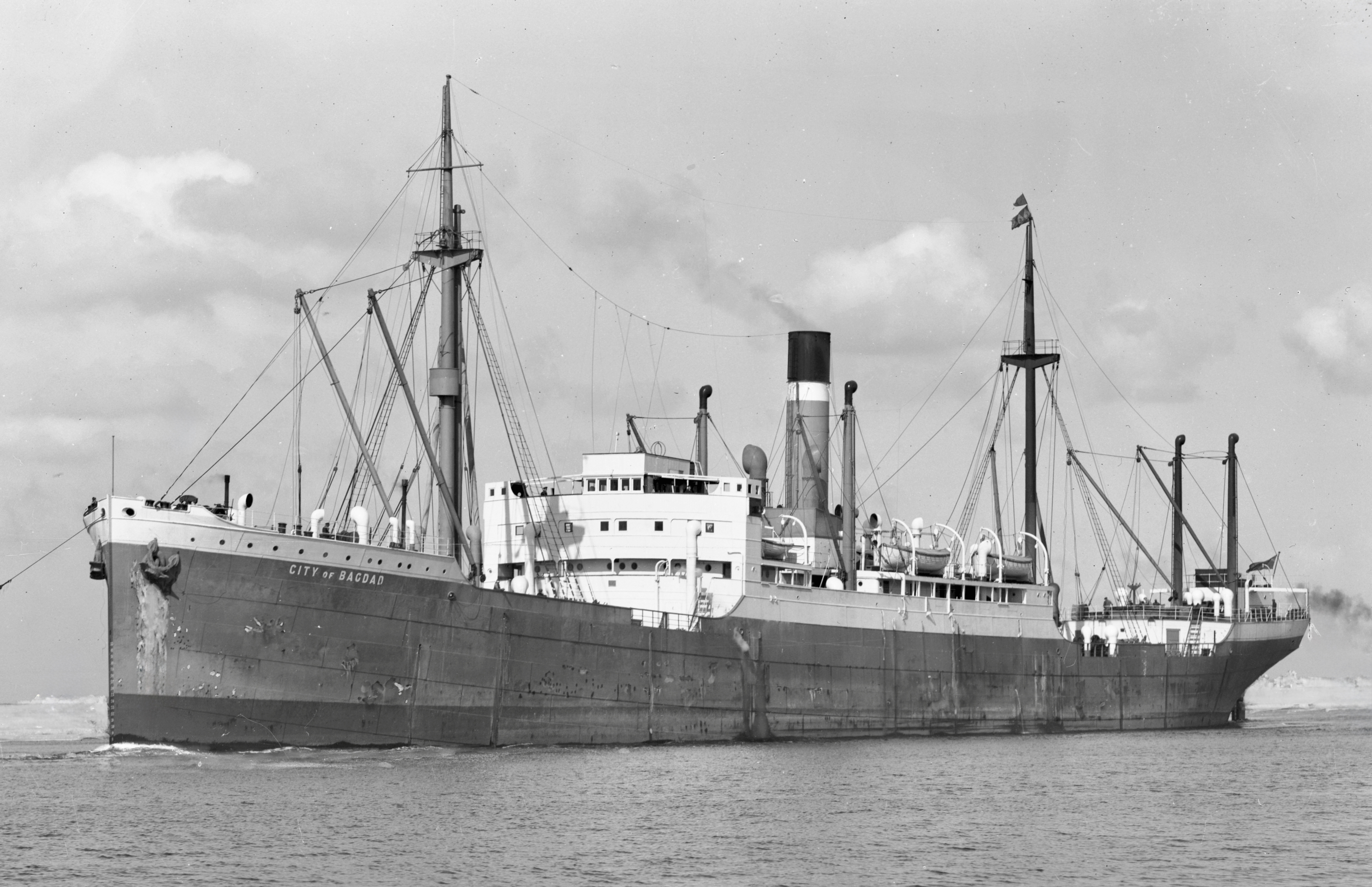
- City of Bagdad

History
- Name: 1919: Geierfels; 1921: City of Bagdad
- Namesake: 1921: Baghdad
- Owner: 1919: DDG Hansa; 1920: Shipping Controller; 1921: Montgomery & Workman; 1936: Ellerman Lines
- Operator: 1920: George Thompson & Co; 1921: Ellerman's City Line
- Port of registry: 1919: (German Empire) Bremen; 1920: (United Kingdom) London; 1921: (United Kingdom) Glasgow
- Builder: Joh. C. Tecklenborg, Geestemünde
- Yard number: 277
- Launched: 8 November 1918
- Completed: 29 April 1920
- Identification: 1919: code letters QLCS; 1920: UK official number 144643; 1920: code letters KGFC; by 1930: call sign GDKQ
- Fate: Sunk by Atlantis, 1940

General characteristics
- Type: cargo ship
- Tonnage: 7,490 GRT, 4,698 NRT, 11,400 DWT
- Length: 470.3 ft (143.3 m)
- Beam: 58.2 ft (17.7 m)
- Depth: 32.3 ft (9.8 m)
- Decks: 2
- Installed power: as built: triple-expansion engine: 3,600 ihp, 347 NHP; by 1930: as above, plus exhaust steam turbine: 4,800 ihp, 819 NHP
- Propulsion: single screw
- Speed: 12 knots (22 km/h)
- Crew: as built: 55; later: 81
- Sensors & processing systems: by 1935: wireless direction finding
- Notes: one of seven sister ships built 1915–21

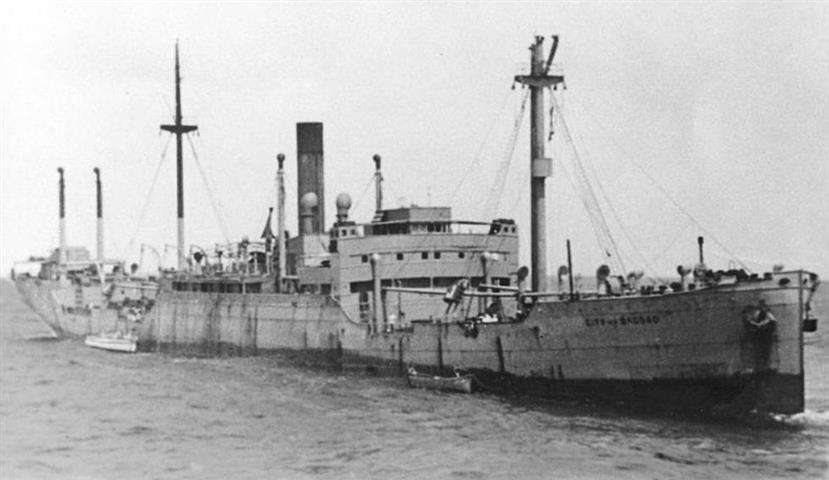
City of Bagdad shortly after capture by Atlantis

City of Bagdad was a cargo steamship. She was built in Germany, and launched in 1918 as Geierfels for DDG Hansa. However, the United Kingdom seized her as part of Germany's World War I reparations to the Allies under Article 231 of the Treaty of Versailles. In 1921 Ellerman Lines acquired her and renamed her City of Bagdad.

In 1940, the German merchant raider Atlantis shelled and captured her, took her crew prisoner, and scuttled her. The shelling killed at least two of City of Bagdad's crew, and wounded a number of others. The remainder were held as prisoners of war for at least eight months: three months aboard Atlantis, one month aboard the prize ship Durmitor, and four months in a PoW camp in Italian Somaliland. A number of City of Bagdad's crew died in captivity, either aboard Atlantis, or in Italian Somaliland. British or Empire troops liberated them in March or April 1941, when they invaded Italian Somaliland.

Geierfels was the third of a series of seven sister ships that Joh. C. Tecklenborg of Geestemünde in Bremerhaven built for DDG Hansa between 1915 and 1921. The others were Altenfels (later renamed Stolzenfels), launched in 1915; Treuenfels, launched in 1916; Frauenfels, launched in 1919; and Bärenfels, Marienfels, and Ockenfels, launched in 1921.

This was the first of two ships built for DDG Hansa that were named Geierfels. The second was a heavy-lift ship that was launched in 1930, completed in 1931, and sunk in 1940.

== Geierfels ==
Tecklenborg built the ship as yard number 277. She was launched on 8 November 1918 as Geierfels, and completed on 29 April 1920. Her registered length was 470.3 ft (143.3 m), her beam was 58.2 ft (17.7 m), and her depth was 32.3 ft (9.8 m). Her tonnages were 7,490 GRT, 4,698 NRT, and 11,400 DWT. She had a single screw, driven by a three-cylinder triple-expansion engine that was rated at 3,600 ihp or 347 NHP, and gave her a speed of 12 knots (22 km/h). She was designed for a crew of 55. DDG Hansa registered Geierfels at Bremen. Her code letters were QLCS.

On 2 July 1920, DDG Hansa surrendered the ship to the UK authorities at Leith on the Firth of Forth in Scotland. The Shipping Controller registered her in London. Her UK official number was 144643, and her code letters were KGFC. The Shipping Controller appointed George Thompson & Co to manage her.

== City of Bagdad ==
In 1921 Montgomery & Workman bought the ship, renamed her City of Bagdad, registered her in Glasgow, and appointed Ellerman's City Line to manage her. Ellerman's increased her complement to 81: 21 officers, and 60 ratings. Ellerman's, like DDG Hansa, employed European officers and lascar ratings.

By 1930 City of Bagdad had been fitted with a Bauer-Wach exhaust steam turbine, which was driven by steam from the low-pressure cylinder of her piston engine. The turbine drove the same shaft as the piston engine, via double-reduction gearing and a Föttinger fluid coupling. It increased her total power to 4,800 ihp, or 819 NHP. Also by 1930, her call sign was GDKQ, and by 1934 this had superseded her code letters. By 1935 she was equipped with wireless direction finding. By 1936, Ellerman Lines had become her owners, as Montgomerie and Workman had withdrawn from ship-owning.

== War service ==
City of Bagdad sailed unescorted for the first six months of the Second World War. On 10 September 1939, she left Baltimore. She called at New York and Philadelphia, and on 22 September left for India. She called at Cape Town, East London, and Durban in South Africa and Lourenço Marques (now Maputo) in Moçambique before reaching Bombay (now Mumbai) on 11 November. She called at Madras (now Chennai), and on 22 November reached Calcutta.

On 8 December 1939, City of Bagdad left Calcutta. She called at Colombo in Ceylon; Lourenço Marques; Cape Town; and Saint John, New Brunswick, and on 3 February 1940 reached Boston. She called at New York, Philadelphia, and Baltimore, and on 1 March reached Halifax, Nova Scotia, where she joined her first convoy, HX 26, which left Halifax on 9 March. HX 26 was bound for Liverpool, but City of Bagdad detached and continued to Portland, where she arrived on 26 March. From there she sailed via Southend, where she joined Convoy FN 123. This was a North Sea northbound convoy to Methil in Scotland, but City of Bagdad detached for Hull, where she arrived on 31 March.

On 28 April 1940, City of Bagdad left either Hull or Immingham, and by 20 May she was leaving Middlesbrough to join Convoy FS 174. This was a North Sea southbound convoy coming from the River Tyne, which she joined to reach Southend. There she transferred to outbound convoy OA 153GF, which left Southend on 22 May, and became Convoy OG 31F on 25 May. She called at Dakar in Senegal on 26 June and Lourenço Marques on 26–28 June 1940 and was bound for Hong Kong.

== Capture and sinking ==
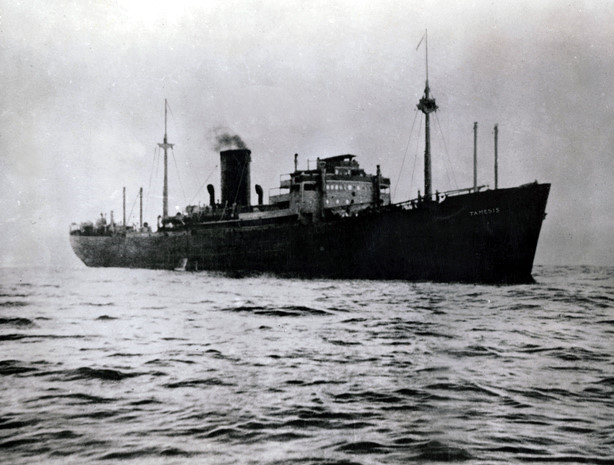
German auxiliary cruiser Atlantis

On the morning of 11 July, City of Bagdad was about 400 nautical miles (740 km) west of Addu Atoll when she sighted what appeared to be a Dutch cargo ship, at a range of about 3 1/2 nautical miles (6.5 km). It was Atlantis in disguise, which closed on City of Bagdad, and then raised the German war ensign, raised signal flags ordering City of Bagdad to stop, and fired two warning shots. The British ship's Master, Captain J Armstrong White, disregarded the instruction, and ordered his wireless telegraphist to transmit the distress signal "QQQQ", meaning "A Q-ship is attacking me".

Atlantis started transmitting with her more powerful radio, which jammed the latter part of City of Bagdad's distress signal. She also opened fire again. Her first salvo felled City of Bagdad's foremast, and with it her radio aerial. The second destroyed her radio room, wounding her wireless telegraphist. Two lascars were killed. Captain White gave the order to heave to and abandon ship. He also gathered City of Bagdad's confidential documents, to be destroyed or thrown overboard to prevent their capture. Atlantis ceased fire, and signalled City of Bagdad's crew to remain aboard their ship. In fear, the lascar crew disregarded the German order. Captain White interrupted dealing with the confidential documents in order to try to calm the crew, who continued to lower the lifeboats and abandon ship.

A US cargo ship, the Prudential Steamship Corporation's Eastern Guide, received City of Bagdad's incomplete signal. Her wireless telegraphist replied "Who shelled by?" Atlantis' wireless operator replied that all was well, but Eastern Guide's wireless telegraphist recognised that the reply was from a different transmitter. He told Atlantis to stop transmitting, and repeated the question. However, a shore-based radio station then interrupted, and ordered Eastern Guide to stop transmitting.

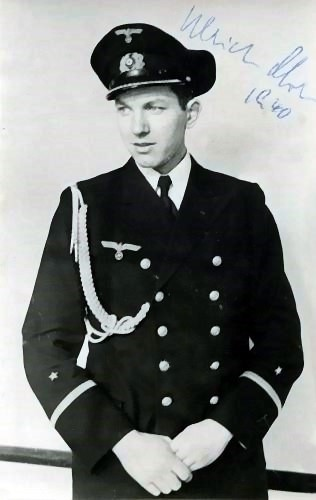
Ulrich Mohr in 1940

Atlantis' Captain, Bernhard Rogge, sent a boarding party by boat to City of Bagdad. It was commanded by his adjutant, Ulrich Mohr, who captured Captain White in his cabin, along with UK Merchant Navy fleet codes and Admiralty routeing instructions. The prisoners were transferred to Atlantis, and City of Bagdad was sunk at position 00°16′S 90°00′E. Ironically, Atlantis was another former DDG Hansa ship, having been launched in 1937 as Goldenfels.

== Crew imprisonment and liberation ==
City of Bagdad's crew were imprisoned aboard Atlantis for more than three months, and were joined by the crews and passengers of other ships that she captured and sank. City of Bagdad's cook died aboard Atlantis on 6 August. On 22 October, Atlantis captured the neutral Yugoslav cargo ship Durmitor, and kept her as a prize ship. Four days later, the Germans transferred 250 Allied prisoners of war to the prize ship. A prize crew of 12 German ratings, commanded by a Lieutenant Dehnel, sailed Durmitor to Italian Somaliland. She was low on coal, so it was not until 22 November that she reached Warsheikh.

The crews were held in a prisoner of war camp in Italian Somaliland, where the Fifth Engineer died on 31 December 1940, and the Fourth Engineer died on 1 January 1941. In March 1941, British, South African, and Somali troops invaded Italian Somaliland, liberated Allied prisoners of war held there, and evacuated them to Kenya.

== Bibliography ==
- Clarkson, John; Fenton, Roy (1993). Ellerman Lines. Ships in Focus. Preston: John and Marion Clarkson. ISBN 0-952-1179-6-7.
- Collard, Ian (2014). Ellerman Lines Remembering a Great British Company. Stroud: The History Press. ISBN 978-0-7524-8963-6.
- Duffy, James P (2005). Hitler's Secret Pirate Fleet: The Deadliest Ships of World War II. Lincoln, NE: University of Nebraska Press. ISBN 0-8032-6652-9 – via Google Books.
- Gray, Leonard (1967). Deutsche Dampfschifffahrts-Gesellschaft "Hansa": 85 Years of Shipping Under the Maltese Cross. Kendal: World Ship Society.
- Haws, Duncan (1989). Ellerman Lines. Merchant Fleets. Vol. 16. Hereford: Travel Creatours Ltd Publications. ISBN 0-946378-05-3.
- Lloyd's Register of Shipping (PDF). Vol. II.–Steamers and Motorships of 300 tons gross and over. London: Lloyd's Register of Shipping. 1930 – via Southampton City Council.
- Lloyd's Register of Shipping (PDF). Vol. II.–Steamers and Motorships over 300 tons. London: Lloyd's Register of Shipping. 1935 – via Southampton City Council.
- Lloyd's Register of Shipping (PDF). Vol. II.–Steamers and Motorships over 300 tons. London: Lloyd's Register of Shipping. 1936 – via Southampton City Council.
- Mercantile Navy List. London. 1921 – via Crew List Index Project.
- Mercantile Navy List. London. 1923 – via Crew List Index Project.
- Mercantile Navy List. London. 1930 – via Crew List Index Project.
- Mercantile Navy List. London. 1931 – via Crew List Index Project.
- Mercantile Navy List. London. 1937 – via Crew List Index Project.
- Mohr, Ulrich; Sellwood, Arthur V (2008). Ship 16: The Story of a German Surface Raider. Foreword by J Armstrong White. Stroud: Amberley Publishing. ISBN 978-1-84868-115-6 – via Google Books.
- Rohwer, Jürgen; Hümmelchen, Gerhard (1968). Chronik des Seekrieges 1939–1945 (in German). Oldenburg: Stalling – via Württembergische Landesbibliothek.
