= SS Bärenfels (1921) =

German cargo steamship

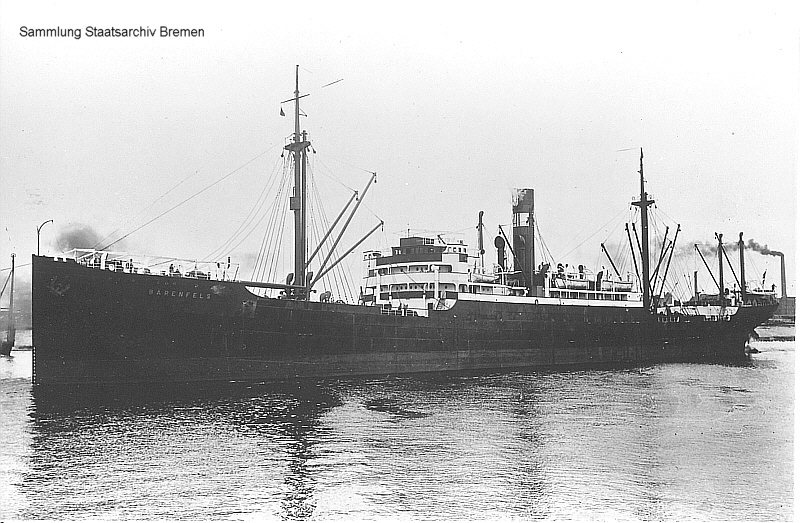
- Bärenfels in 1922

History

Germany
- Name: Bärenfels
- Owner: DDG Hansa
- Port of registry: Bremen
- Builder: Joh. C. Tecklenborg, Geestemünde
- Yard number: 285
- Launched: 5 February 1921
- Completed: 2 May 1921
- Identification: code letters QLHM (until 1933); call sign DOMI (by 1934)
- Fate: Sunk by air attack 14 April 1940; Sunk by midget sub 14 April 1944; Sank under tow 1947

General characteristics
- Type: cargo liner
- Tonnage: 7,569 GRT; 4,679 NRT; 11,000 DWT
- Length: 468.5 ft (142.8 m)
- Beam: 58.6 ft (17.9 m)
- Draught: 27.1 ft (8.27 m)
- Depth: 32.5 ft (9.9 m)
- Decks: 2
- Installed power: as built: triple-expansion engine; 3,600 IHP; 1928 onward: as above, plus exhaust steam turbine; total 4,100 IHP (692 NHP)
- Propulsion: single screw
- Speed: 12 knots (22 km/h)
- Capacity: 4 passengers
- Crew: 64
- Armament: (in WW2): 4 × 20mm anti-aircraft guns
- Notes: one of seven sister ships built 1915–21

SS Bärenfels was a German steam cargo liner that was launched in 1921 for DDG Hansa. In 1940, she took part in the German invasion of Norway and was sunk by Fleet Air Arm dive bombers. Her wreck was raised, and in 1941, she was returned to service. In 1944, a Royal Navy midget submarine sank her, killing 11 of her complement. In 1947, her wreck was raised to be scrapped, but while under tow she sank a third time. The wreck is now a recreational wreck diving site.

Bärenfels was the fifth of a series of seven sister ships built for DDG Hansa that started with Altenfels (later renamed Stolzenfels) launched in 1915. The others were Treuenfels launched in 1916; Geierfels launched in 1918; Frauenfels launched in 1919; and Marienfels and Ockenfels launched after Bärenfels in 1921.

This was the second of four DDG Hansa ships called Bärenfels. The first was a steamship built in 1898 that the United Kingdom captured in 1914. The third was a heavy-lift motor ship that was built in 1951 and which DDG Hansa sold in 1972. The fourth was a heavy-lift motor ship that was built in 1976 and sold when DDG Hansa went into receivership in 1980.

== Building ==
Joh. C. Tecklenborg built Bärenfels in Geestemünde, which is now part of Bremerhaven. She was launched on 5 February 1921 and completed on 2 May. Her registered length was 468.5 ft (142.8 m); her beam was 58.6 ft (17.9 m); her depth was 32.5 ft (9.9 m); and her draught was 27.1 ft (8.27 m). Her tonnages were 7,569 GRT; 4,679 NRT; and 11,000 DWT. She had one 30-ton derrick; two 20-ton derricks; 16 five-ton derricks; and berths for four passengers. She had a straight stem, and a fantail stern.

Bärenfels had a single screw, driven by a three-cylinder triple-expansion engine that was rated at 3,600 IHP. An exhaust steam turbine was added in 1928–29 (see below).

== Peacetime service ==
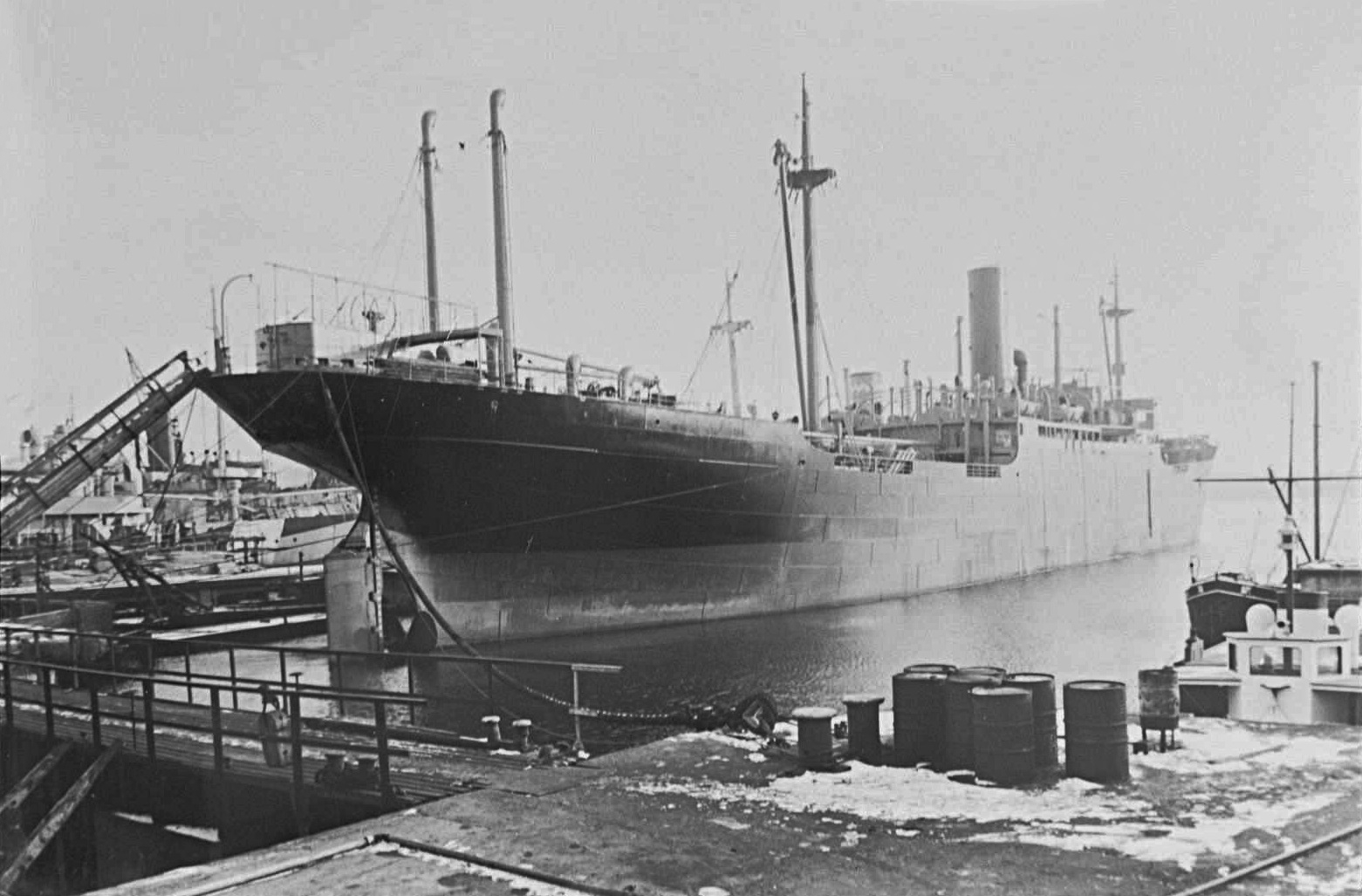
Bärenfels high in the water, showing her fantail stern

Bärenfels was registered in Bremen. She worked DDG Hansa's cargo liner route between Germany, the Persian Gulf, India and Burma.

On 7 May 1924, the Swedish steamship Yeddo collided with Bärenfels in the Scheldt. Yeddo was beached but later sank.

In 1926, JC Tecklenborg introduced the Bauer-Wach system in which a low-pressure steam turbine could be fitted beside a piston engine, driven by exhaust steam from the piston engine's low-pressure cylinder, and drive the same propeller shaft via double-reduction gearing and a Föttinger fluid coupling.

In May 1928, DDG Hansa returned Bärenfels to Geestemünde for a Bauer-Wach exhaust turbine to be added. For some reason the work seems to have taken 18 months. On 8 November 1929, JC Tecklenborg returned Bärenfels to DDG Hansa. The turbine increased her total power to 4,100 IHP and gave her a speed of 12 knots (22 km/h).

Bärenfels' code letters were QLHM until 1933. In 1934 they were superseded by the call sign DOMI.

== Norway ==
On 8 March 1940, Bärenfels was assigned to the Ausfuhrstaffel ("export squadron") of the German invasion of Norway. She was meant to reach Narvik in northern Norway, but got only as far as Bergen in southwest Norway, where she docked on 10 April.

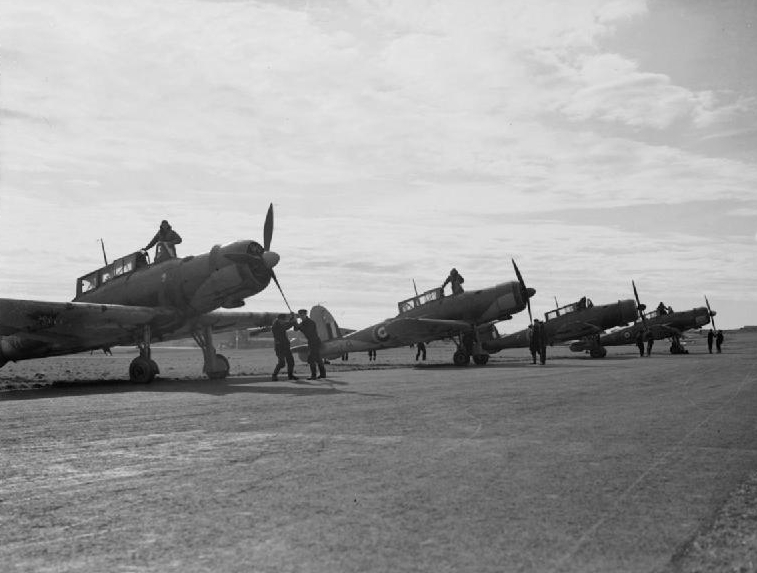
Blackburn Skuas at RNAS Hatston, the airbase from which they attacked Bergen and one sank Bärenfels

On 14 April 1940, Blackburn Skua aircraft of 800 and 803 squadrons from RNAS Hatston in Orkney attacked German targets in Bergen. Lieutenant William Lucy of 803 Squadron hit and damaged Bärenfels. German munitions on the quayside exploded destroying part of the quay. Bärenfels' hull was torn open on her port quarter and she sank at her moorings.

Norwegian salvage ships pumped out Bärenfels' engine room, she was raised and on 13 August, she was placed in a floating dock in Bergen. On 9 November, she was towed to Oslo, where Akers mekaniske Verksted repaired her. Work was completed on 29 October 1941 at a cost of 1.6 million ℛ︁ℳ︁. On 10 May 1942, the Kriegsmarine requisitioned Bärenfels as a transport ship.

By April 1944, Bärenfels was defensively armed with four 20mm anti-aircraft guns: one each on her forecastle and poop deck, and two amidships (one each port and starboard). She had between 20 and 25 gunners to crew the guns.

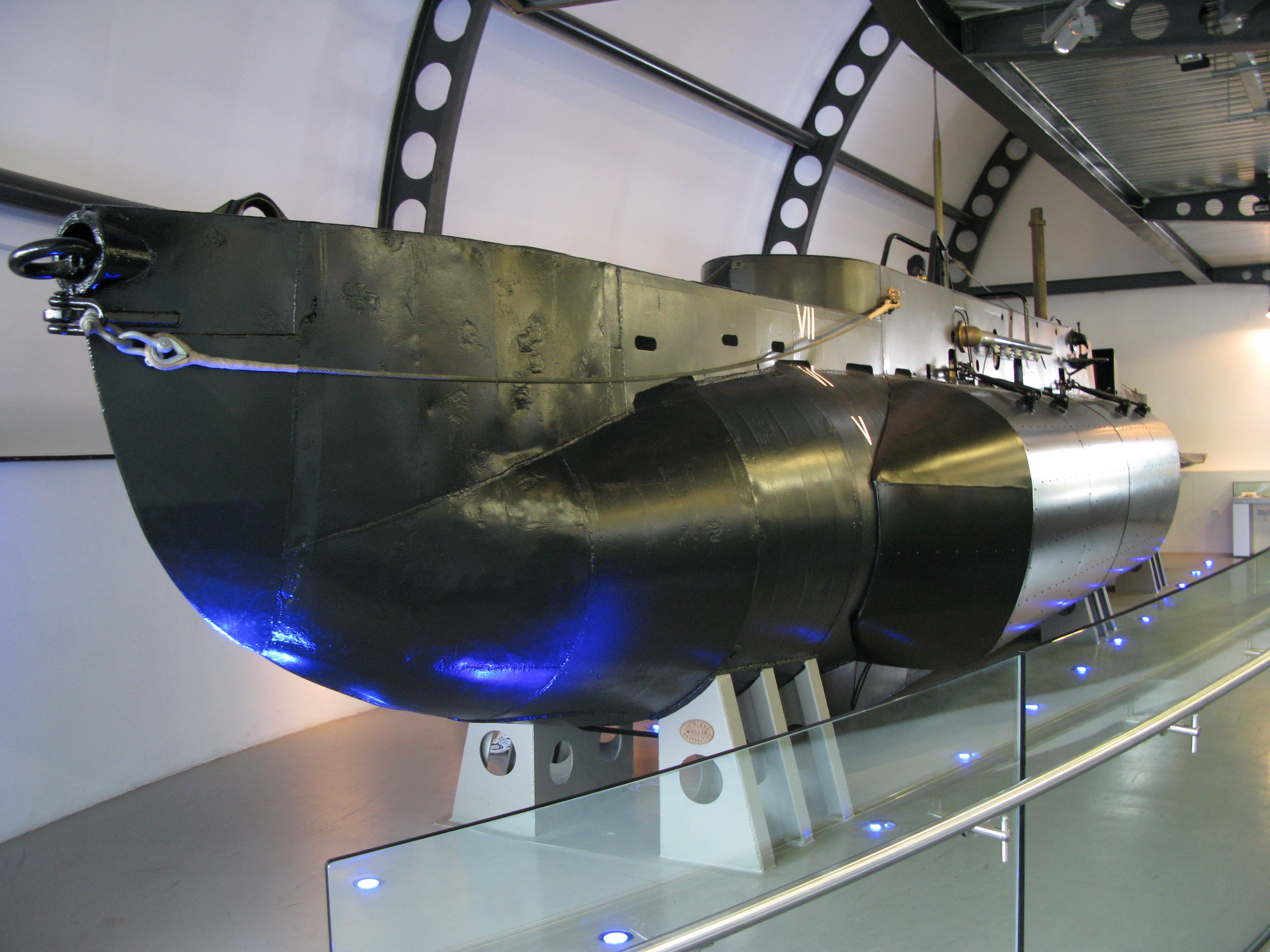
X-class submarine X-24, which sank Bärenfels, is preserved in the Submarine Museum in Gosport

On 14 April 1944, the Royal Navy X-class submarine X-24 penetrated Bergen harbour to sink the floating dock. Bärenfels was at the nearby coal wharf unloading about 8,000 tons of coal and coke. At 0848 hrs X-24's crew planted a limpet mine on the hull of Bärenfels instead of the floating dock. The mine blew a hole in Bärenfels' engine room and she sank at her moorings again. 11 of her gunners were trapped in the after part of the ship, and were killed when it sank.

On 11 September, X-24 returned and succeeded in sinking the floating dock.

In 1947, Bärenfels' wreck was raised again, this time with the intention of taking her to Askøy to be scrapped. Two barges were used to keep her afloat, but they could not hold her and she sank again. Her wreck is at 60.5202°N 5.075°E, in 24 to 35 m (79 to 115 ft) of water, and is now a destination for recreational divers.
