= USS Sutton (DE-286) =

History

United States
- Name: USS Sutton
- Namesake: Ensign Shelton B. Sutton, Jr., (1919-1942), a U.S. Navy officer killed in action during World War II
- Builder: Bethlehem-Hingham Shipyard, Hingham, Massachusetts or Charleston Navy Yard, Charleston, South Carolina (proposed)
- Laid down: Never
- Fate: Construction contract cancelled 12 March 1944

General characteristics
- Class & type: Rudderow destroyer escort
- Displacement: 1,450 tons (standard); 1,810 tons (full load)
- Length: 306 ft (93 m) overall; 300 ft (91 m) waterline
- Beam: 36 ft 10 in (11.23 m)
- Draft: 9 ft 8 in (2.95 m)
- Installed power: 12,000 shaft horsepower (16 megawatts)
- Propulsion: 2 CE boilers, General Electric turbines with electric drive, 2 screws
- Speed: 24 knots (44.5 kilometers per hour)
- Range: 5,050 nautical miles (9,353 kilometers) at 12 knots (22.25 kilometers per hour)
- Complement: 12 officers, 192 enlisted men
- Armament: 2 × 5-inch 38-cal (127-millimeter) (2x1); 4 × 40-mm (2x2); 10 × 20 mm (10x1); 3 × 21-inch torpedo tubes (1x3); 1 Hedgehog depth bomb thrower; 8 depth charge projectors (8x1); 2 depth charge racks

USS Sutton (DE-286) was a proposed United States Navy Rudderow-class destroyer escort that was never built.

Sources differ on Sutton's planned builder; plans called for either Bethlehem-Hingham Shipyard at Hingham, Massachusetts or the Charleston Navy Yard at Charleston, South Carolina to build her. The contract for her construction was cancelled on 12 March 1944 before construction could begin.

The name Sutton was transferred to the destroyer escort USS Sutton (DE-771).
