= Bernhard Rogge =

German naval officer

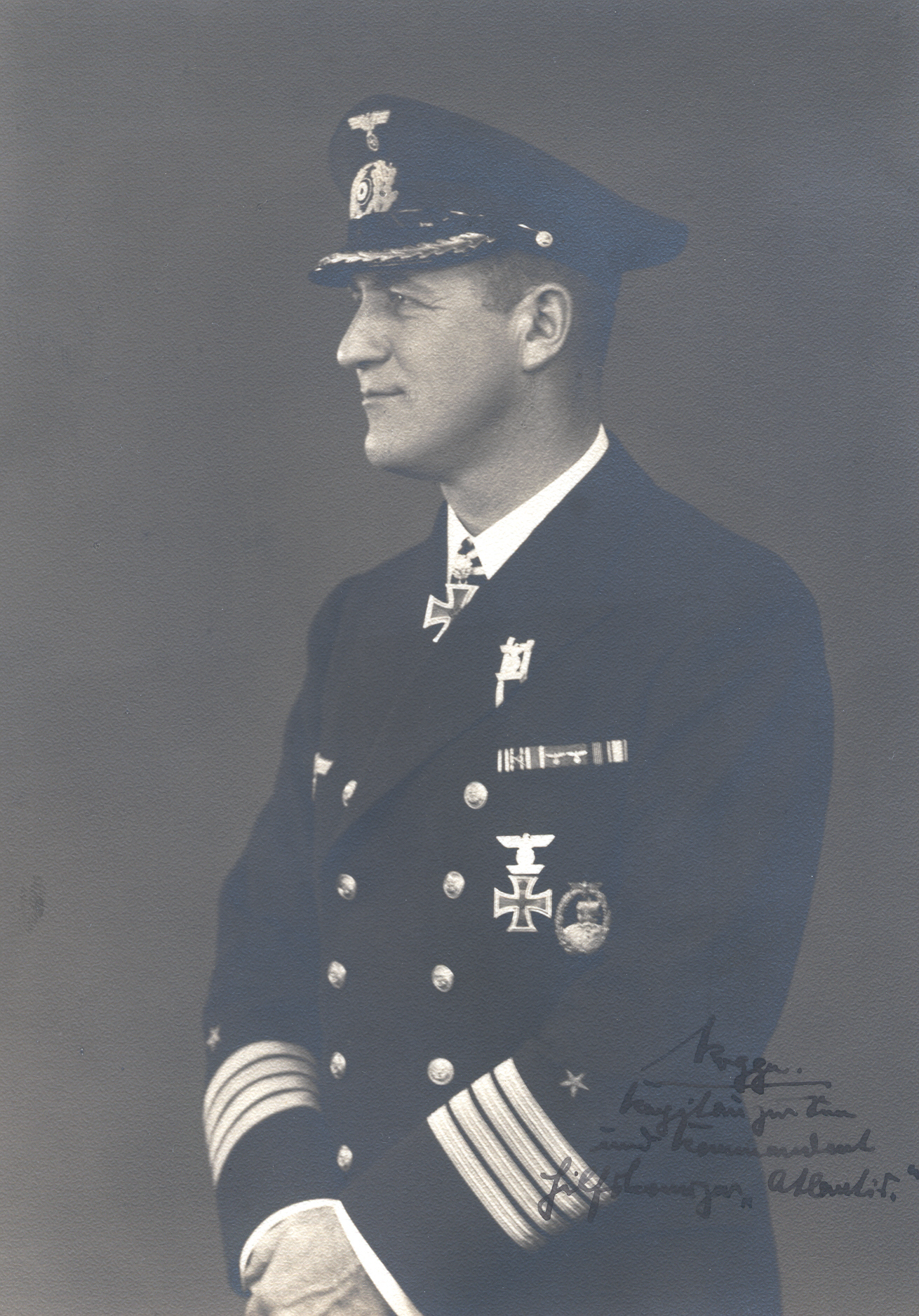
- Born: 4 November 1899; Schleswig, Prussia, German Empire
- Died: 29 June 1982 (aged 82); Reinbek, West Germany
- Military career
- Allegiance: German Empire (to 1918); Weimar Republic (to 1933); Nazi Germany (to 1945); West Germany
- Branch: Imperial German Navy; Reichsmarine; Kriegsmarine; West German Navy
- Service years: 1915–45; 1957–62
- Rank: Vizeadmiral (Kriegsmarine); Konteradmiral (West German Navy)
- Commands: SSS Niobe (in deputize); SSS Gorch Fock; SSS Albert Leo Schlageter; Auxiliary cruiser Atlantis
- Conflicts: World War I World War II
- Awards: Knight's Cross of the Iron Cross with Oak Leaves; Great Cross of Merit

Bernhard Rogge (4 November 1899 – 29 June 1982) was a German naval officer who, during World War II, commanded a merchant raider. Later, he became a Konteradmiral in West Germany's navy.

Rogge became a Vizeadmiral (vice-admiral) by the end of World War II, and, when the West German navy was established after the war, returned to service as a Konteradmiral (rear-admiral). He also was one of the few German officers of flag rank who was not arrested by the Allies after the war. This was due to the way he had exercised his command of Atlantis.

== Early life ==
Rogge was born in Schleswig, the son of a Lutheran minister, and was himself devoutly religious. His grandmother, on his mother's side, was Jewish.

== Military career ==
- 1915 — joins the Imperial German Navy as a volunteer
- After World War I — serves on various cruisers
- Mid-1930s to 1939 — commander of the sail training ship SSS Albert Leo Schlageter
- September 1939 — assigned to the German auxiliary cruiser Atlantis
  - Mid-December 1939 — Atlantis is formally commissioned
  - 31 March 1940 — Atlantis sets out to sea
  - 11 November 1940 — Atlantis scuttles British cargo ship SS Automedon near Sumatra after retrieving top secret documents for which the Japanese government would reward Rogge with an ornate katana in April 1943
  - 22 November 1941 — Atlantis is sunk by HMS Devonshire
  - 15 Apr 1942- Chief of Staff to Inspector of Training Affairs
  - 1 March 1943- promoted to Konteradmiral and Inspector of Training Affairs
  - 20 Sept 1944- Cdr Fleet Training Formations
  - 1 March 1945- promoted to Vizeadmiral
- After World War II — discharged
- 1 June 1957 — enters the post-World War II West German Bundesmarine with the rank of Konteradmiral
  - 1 June 1957 – 29 September 1957 — delegated with the Command of Military Area Command I

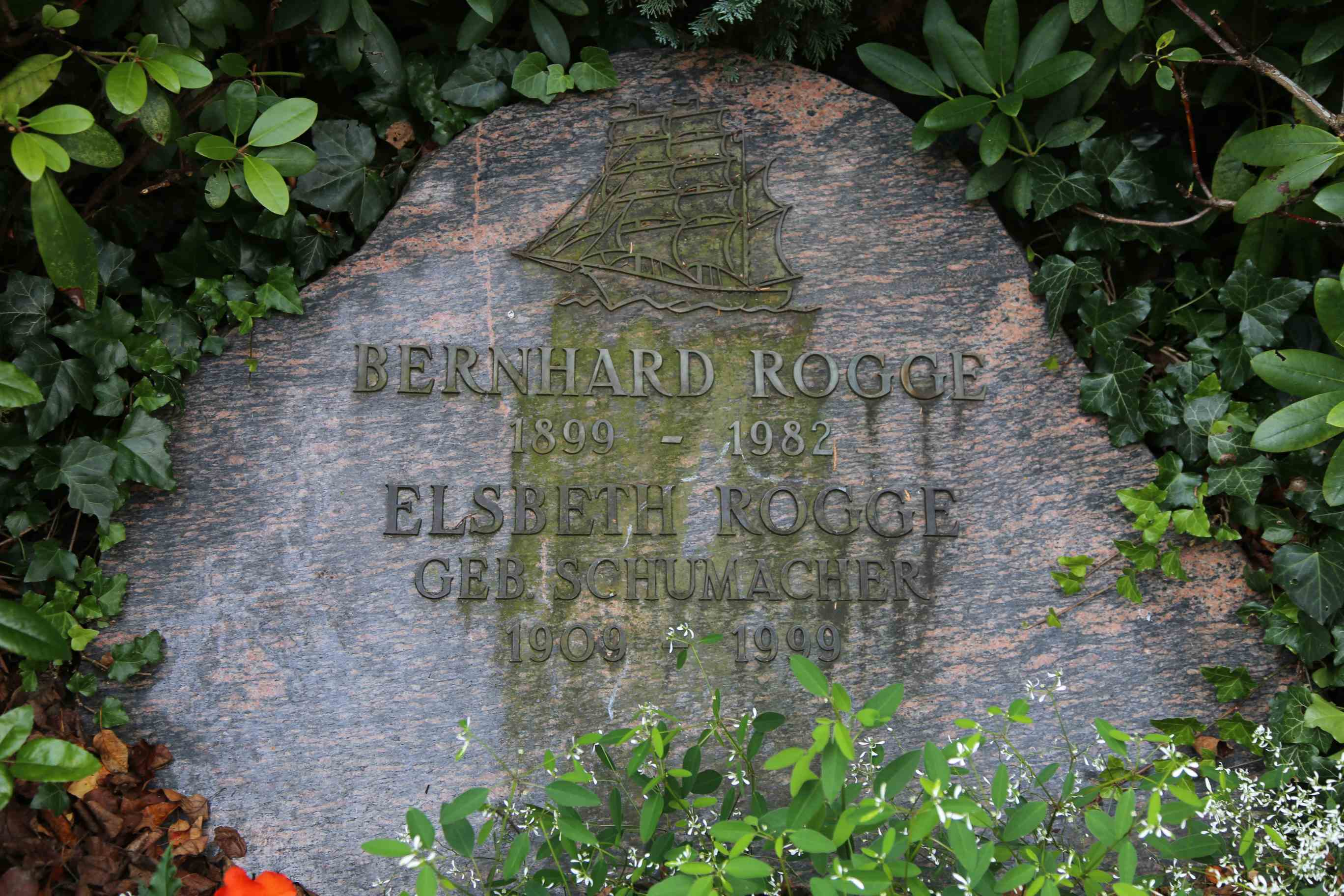
Grave of Bernhard Rogge

  - 30 September 1957 – 31 March 1962 — Commander of Military Area Command I
  - 15 April 1958 – 31 March 1962 — at the same time, NATO Commander of Land Forces in Schleswig-Holstein (COMLAND-SCHLESWIG)
- 31 March 1962 — retires from the German Bundesmarine as a Konteradmiral

== Assessment ==
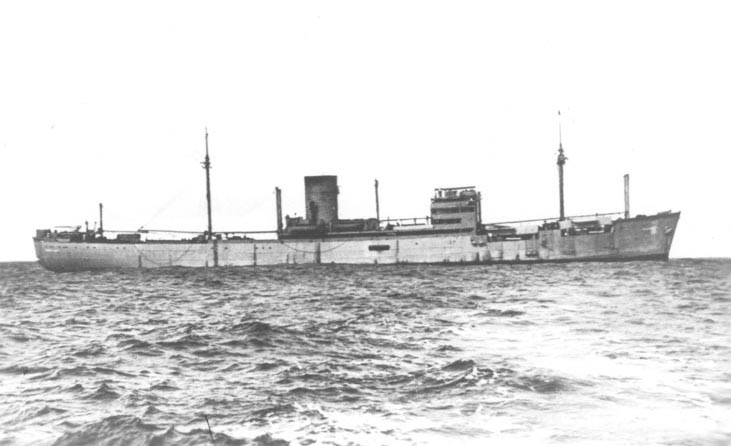
Atlantis

J. Armstrong White, captain of the British merchant ship City of Bagdad, which Atlantis sank in July 1940, stated, "His treatment of prisoners left respect, instead of hatred". White later wrote the foreword to Atlantis, the Story of a German Surface Raider, written by U. Mohr & A. V. Sellwood.

Admiral Karl Dönitz, who was, following Adolf Hitler's suicide briefly head of state of Nazi Germany in May 1945, and was prosecuted for war crimes at the Nuremberg Trials, cited his own support of Rogge, who had a Jewish grandparent, in an effort to clear himself of the charge of being antisemitic.

Rogge confirmed the death sentence of the 21-year-old sailor Johann Christian Süß. Süß was sentenced to death on 10 May 1945, two days after the German capitulation, for "undermining the discipline" and "disruptive speeches" based on paragraph 5 numeral 2 of the Kriegssonderstrafrechtsverordnung (KSSVO—Special War Criminal Regulation). Süß was executed by firing squad on 11 May 1945.

== Awards ==
- Iron Cross (1914) 2nd and 1st Class
- General Honor Decoration
- Honour Cross of the World War 1914/1918 (7 November 1934)
- War Merit Cross 2nd Class with Swords
- Wehrmacht Long Service Award, 4th to 1st Class
- Italian Bronze Medal of Military Valor (Medaglia di bronzo al Valore Militare) (25 September 1941)
- Order of the Sacred Treasure (Japan)
- Japanese sword (27 April 1942)
- Clasp to the Iron Cross (1939) 2nd and 1st Class
- Knight's Cross of the Iron Cross with Oak Leaves
  - Knight's Cross on 7 December 1940 as Kapitän zur See and commander of auxiliary cruiser Atlantis (HSK 2)
  - 45th Oak Leaves on 31 December 1941 as Kapitän zur See and commander of HSK 2 auxiliary cruiser Atlantis (Ship 16)
- Auxiliary Cruiser Badge with diamonds.
- Commanders Cross, Order of Merit of the Federal Republic of Germany (31 March 1962)
- Auxiliary Cruiser Badge with diamonds.

=== Promotions ===
19 April 1916:	Fähnrich zur See (Officer Cadet)
13 December 1917:	Leutnant zur See (Ensign/Sub-Lieutenant)
10 January 1921:	Oberleutnant zur See (Lieutenant, Junior Grade/Sub-Lieutenant) without patent
14 May 1921:	Oberleutnant zur See (Lieutenant, Junior Grade/Sub-Lieutenant)
1 January 1928:	Kapitänleutnant (Lieutenant)
1 October 1934:	Korvettenkapitän (Lieutenant Commander)
1 November 1937:	Fregattenkapitän (Commander)
1 November 1939:	Kapitän zur See (Captain)
1 March 1943:	Konteradmiral (Rear Admiral)
1 March 1945:	Vizeadmiral (Vice Admiral)
1 June 1957:	Konteradmiral in the Bundesmarine

== Works ==
- Rogge, Bernhard, and Wolfgang Frank. Under Ten Flags. New York: Ballantine, 1960; which is a translation of Schiff 16.
