= Greenwich Township, New Jersey =

Greenwich Township is the name of some places in the U.S. state of New Jersey:

- Greenwich Township, Cumberland County, New Jersey
  - Greenwich (CDP), Cumberland County, New Jersey
- Greenwich Township, Gloucester County, New Jersey
- Greenwich Township, Warren County, New Jersey

May also refer to:

- East Greenwich Township, New Jersey in Gloucester County

== See also ==
- Greenwich (CDP), New Jersey (disambiguation)
- Greenwich Township (disambiguation)
