= Arrowhead Lake, Cumberland County, New Jersey =

Populated place in Cumberland County, New Jersey, US

Arrowhead Lake, New Jersey
- Census-designated place
- Location in Cumberland County Location in New Jersey Location in the United States
- Coordinates: 39°28′33″N 75°19′25″W
- Country: United States
- State: New Jersey
- County: Cumberland
- Township: Stow Creek

Area
  - Total: 0.22 sq mi (0.58 km^{2})
  - Land: 0.22 sq mi (0.57 km^{2})
  - Water: 0.0039 sq mi (0.01 km^{2})
- Elevation: 70 ft (21 m)

Population (2020)
  - Total: 126
  - Density: 569/sq mi (219.5/km^{2})
- Time zone: UTC−05:00 (Eastern (EST))
  - Summer (DST): UTC−04:00 (EDT)
- ZIP Code: 08302 (Bridgeton)
- Area code: 856
- FIPS code: 34-01825
- GNIS feature ID: 2806227

Arrowhead Lake is an unincorporated community and census-designated place (CDP) in Cumberland County, in the U.S. state of New Jersey. It is in the northwestern part of the county, in the northern part of Stow Creek Township. A small artificial lake is in the northwestern part of the CDP, with a residential neighborhood on its southern shore.

The community is 2 miles (3 km) northwest of Shiloh and 1 mile (1.6 km) south of Marlboro. New Jersey Route 49 forms the eastern boundary of the CDP; the road heads southeast 5 miles (8 km) to Bridgeton and northwest 11 miles (18 km) to Salem.

Arrowhead Lake was first listed as a CDP prior to the 2020 census with a population of 126.

== Demographics ==
Historical population
| Census | Pop. | Note | %± |
|---|---|---|---|
| 2020 | 126 | | — |
U.S. Decennial Census; 2020

Arrowhead Lake first appeared as a census designated place in the 2020 U.S. census.

=== 2020 census ===
Arrowhead Lake CDP, New Jersey – Racial and ethnic composition Note: the US Census treats Hispanic/Latino as an ethnic category. This table excludes Latinos from the racial categories and assigns them to a separate category. Hispanics/Latinos may be of any race.
| Race / Ethnicity (NH = Non-Hispanic) | Pop 2020 | % 2020 |
|---|---|---|
| White alone (NH) | 104 | 82.54% |
| Black or African American alone (NH) | 4 | 3.17% |
| Native American or Alaska Native alone (NH) | 2 | 1.59% |
| Asian alone (NH) | 2 | 1.59% |
| Native Hawaiian or Pacific Islander alone (NH) | 0 | 0.00% |
| Other race alone (NH) | 0 | 0.00% |
| Mixed race or Multiracial (NH) | 4 | 3.17% |
| Hispanic or Latino (any race) | 10 | 7.94% |
| Total | 126 | 100.00% |

== Education ==
Students are zoned to Stow Creek Township School District (for elementary school) and Cumberland Regional School District (for high school).

The Stow Creek school district and the Greenwich Township School District have a cooperative agreement in which all students in grade levels Kindergarten through 4 in both school districts attend the Greenwich Township school facility, Morris Goodwin School, while all students in grades 5-8 in both school districts attend the Stow Creek school facility, Stow Creek School.
