= Sheppards Mill, New Jersey =

Populated place in Cumberland County, New Jersey, US

- Census-designated place
- Location in Cumberland County Location in New Jersey Location in the United States
- Coordinates: 39°24′37″N 75°19′5″W
- Country: United States
- State: New Jersey
- County: Cumberland
- Townships: Greenwich; Hopewell

Area
  - Total: 0.36 sq mi (0.94 km^{2})
  - Land: 0.32 sq mi (0.84 km^{2})
  - Water: 0.039 sq mi (0.10 km^{2})
- Elevation: 20 ft (6.1 m)

Population (2020)
  - Total: 131
  - Density: 405.4/sq mi (156.51/km^{2})
- Time zone: UTC−05:00 (Eastern (EST))
  - Summer (DST): UTC−04:00 (EDT)
- ZIP Codes: 08323 (Greenwich); 08302 (Bridgeton)
- Area code: 856
- FIPS code: 34-66970
- GNIS feature ID: 2806186

Historical population
Census	Pop.	Note	%±
2020	131		—
U.S. Decennial Census

Sheppards Mill is an unincorporated community and census-designated place (CDP) in Cumberland County, in the U.S. state of New Jersey. It is located in the western part of the county in northeastern Greenwich Township and southwestern Hopewell Township. The community is centered on Mill Creek, which is dammed to form Sheppards Millpond in the northwestern part of the CDP. Mill Creek is a southwest-flowing tributary of Wheaton Run, part of the Cohansey River watershed leading to Delaware Bay.

The community is 5 miles (8 km) southwest of Bridgeton, the Cumberland county seat, and less than 2 miles (3 km) northeast of the village of Greenwich.

As of the 2020 census, Sheppards Mill had a population of 131.

Sheppards Mill was first listed as a CDP prior to the 2020 census.

== Demographics ==
Sheppards Mill was first listed as a census designated place in the 2020 U.S. census.

Sheppards Mill CDP, New Jersey – Racial and ethnic composition Note: the US Census treats Hispanic/Latino as an ethnic category. This table excludes Latinos from the racial categories and assigns them to a separate category. Hispanics/Latinos may be of any race.
Race / Ethnicity (NH = Non-Hispanic)	Pop 2020	2020
White alone (NH)	83	63.36%
Black or African American alone (NH)	13	9.92%
Native American or Alaska Native alone (NH)	0	0.00%
Asian alone (NH)	4	3.05%
Native Hawaiian or Pacific Islander alone (NH)	0	0.00%
Other race alone (NH)	3	2.29%
Mixed race or Multiracial (NH)	5	3.82%
Hispanic or Latino (any race)	23	17.56%
Total	131	100.00%

== Education ==
For elementary school, Greenwich Township students are zoned to Greenwich Township School District while Hopewell Township students are zoned to Hopewell Township School District. All students are in the Cumberland Regional School District (for high school).

The Greenwich school district and the Stow Creek Township School District have a cooperative agreement in which all students in grade levels Kindergarten through 4 in both school districts attend the Greenwich Township school facility, Morris Goodwin School, while all students in grades 5–8 in both school districts attend the Stow Creek school facility, Stow Creek School.
