= List of municipalities in South Jersey =

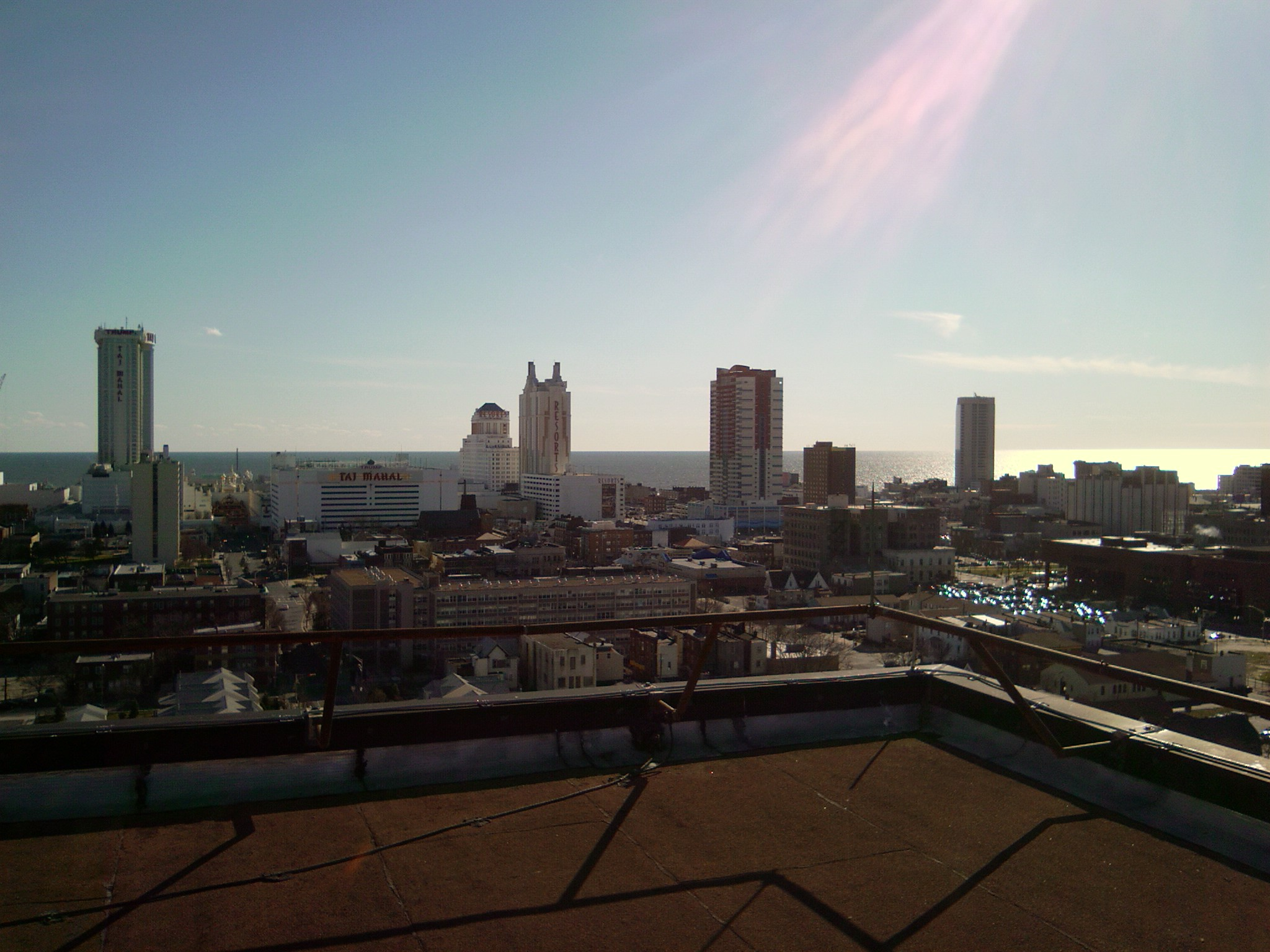
Skyline of Atlantic City, New Jersey

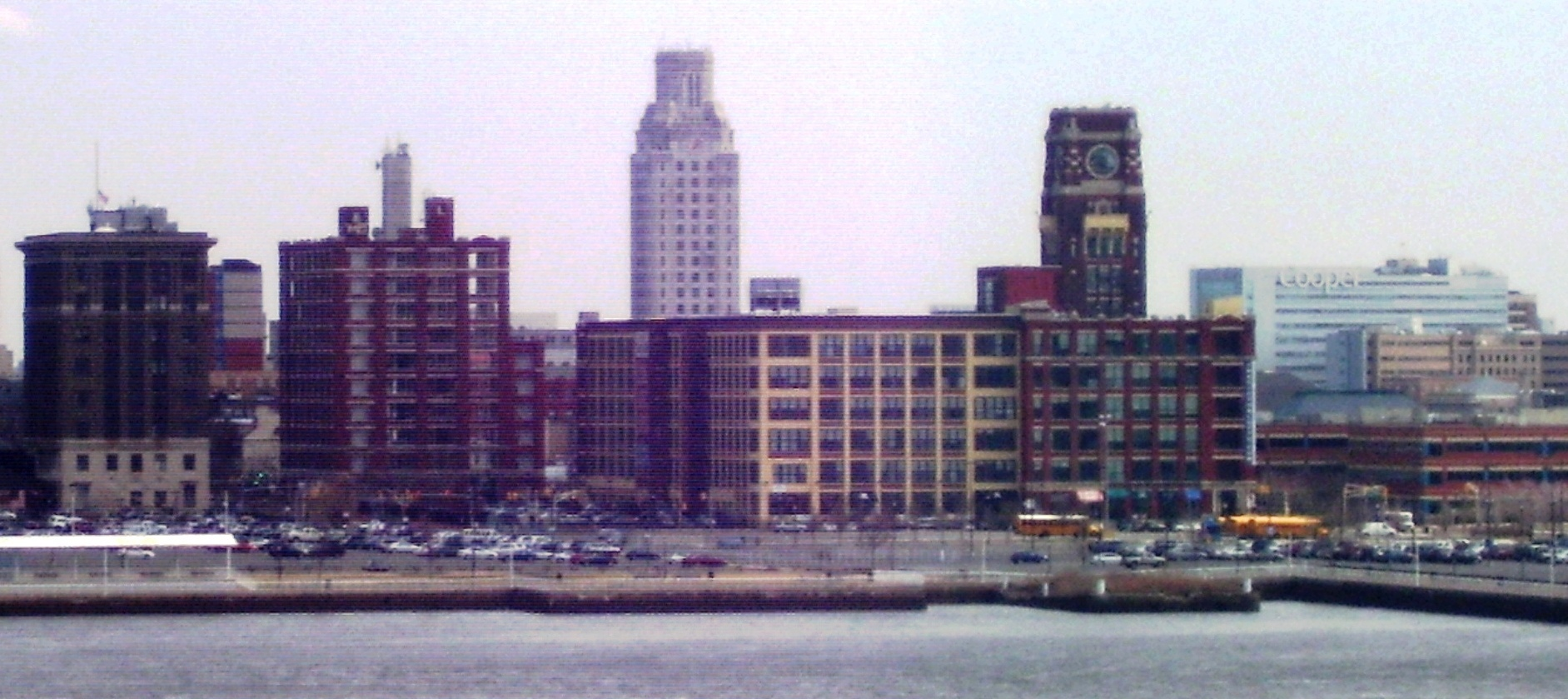
Skyline of Camden, New Jersey

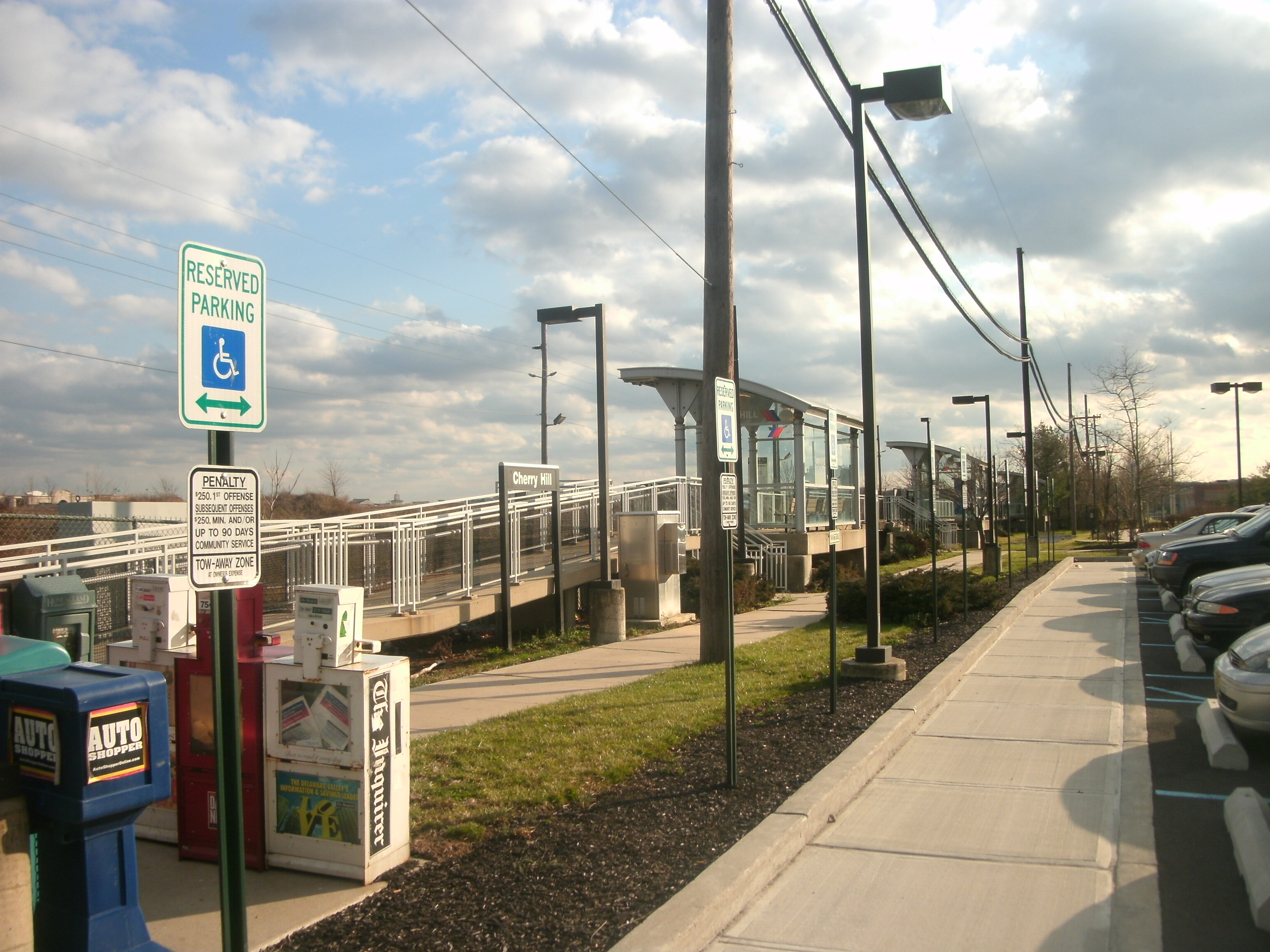
Station in Cherry Hill, New Jersey

South Jersey comprises the southern portion of the U.S. state of New Jersey. It is located between Pennsylvania and the lower Delaware River to its west, the Atlantic Ocean to its east, Delaware to its south, and Central Jersey or North Jersey to its north, depending on the definition of North Jersey.

South Jersey's exact borders are controversial. This page includes a list of municipalities in Atlantic, Burlington, Camden, Cumberland, Gloucester, and Salem counties. The area, population, and population density for each municipality are current as of the 2020 US Census.

== List of municipalities ==
Name	Type	County	Population (2020)	Area (sq mi)	Persons per square mile
Absecon	City	Atlantic	9,136	5.5	1,670.7
Atlantic City	City	Atlantic	38,501	10.8	3,578.0
Brigantine	City	Atlantic	7,718	6.5	1,183.3
Buena Vista Township	Township	Atlantic	7,037	41.1	171.3
Corbin City	City	Atlantic	473	7.7	61.5
Egg Harbor Township	Township	Atlantic	47,844	67.0	713.6
Egg Harbor	City	Atlantic	4,396	10.9	405.1
Estell Manor	City	Atlantic	1,667	53.4	31.2
Folsom	Borough	Atlantic	1,807	8.3	218.7
Galloway Township	Township	Atlantic	37,815	88.7	426.5
Hamilton Township	Township	Atlantic	27,483	110.9	247.8
Hammonton	Town	Atlantic	14,710	40.7	361.0
Linwood	City	Atlantic	6,956	3.8	1,825.0
Longport	Borough	Atlantic	897	0.4	2,269.9
Margate	City	Atlantic	5,312	1.4	3,751.1
Mullica Township	Township	Atlantic	5,815	56.4	103.1
Northfield	City	Atlantic	8,437	3.6	2,355.1
Pleasantville	City	Atlantic	20,629	5.7	3,605.9
Port Republic	City	Atlantic	1,102	7.5	147.7
Somers Point	City	Atlantic	10,474	4.0	2,611.7
Ventnor City	City	Atlantic	9,206	2.0	4,708.3
Weymouth Township	Township	Atlantic	2,614	11.8	221.1
Bass River	Township	Burlington	1,356	75.1	18.1
Beverly	City	Burlington	2,498	0.5	4,615.2
Bordentown	City	Burlington	3,994	0.9	4,273.8
Bordentown Township	Township	Burlington	11,792	8.7	1,361.2
Burlington	City	Burlington	9,740	3.0	3,209.0
Burlington Township	Township	Burlington	23,988	13.5	1,780.0
Chesterfield	Township	Burlington	9,422	21.3	442.1
Cinnaminson	Township	Burlington	17,058	7.4	2,297.7
Delanco	Township	Burlington	4,820	2.4	2,044.4
Delran	Township	Burlington	17,879	6.6	2,696.7
Eastampton	Township	Burlington	6,194	5.7	1,081.0
Edgewater Park	Township	Burlington	8,934	2.9	3,060.2
Evesham Township	Township	Burlington	46,819	29.2	1,605.8
Fieldsboro	Borough	Burlington	531	0.3	1,904.8
Florence	Township	Burlington	12,817	9.8	1,312.1
Hainesport	Township	Burlington	6,034	6.5	932.6
Lumberton	Township	Burlington	12,807	12.9	994.2
Mansfield Township	Township	Burlington	8,901	21.7	409.6
Maple Shade	Township	Burlington	20,010	3.8	5,219.2
Medford	Township	Burlington	24,501	38.8	631.5
Medford Lakes	Borough	Burlington	4,267	1.1	3,743.8
Moorestown	Township	Burlington	21,366	14.7	1,450.6
Mount Holly	Township	Burlington	9,978	2.8	3,533.9
Mount Laurel	Township	Burlington	44,629	21.7	2,054.4
New Hanover	Township	Burlington	6,376	22.3	285.5
North Hanover	Township	Burlington	7,984	17.4	458.4
Palmyra	Borough	Burlington	7,442	1.8	4,024.1
Pemberton	Borough	Burlington	1,370	0.6	2,323.5
Pemberton Township	Township	Burlington	26,893	61.6	436.9
Riverside	Township	Burlington	8,004	1.5	5,392.8
Riverton	Borough	Burlington	2,760	0.7	4,170.6
Shamong Township	Township	Burlington	6,458	44.5	145.3
Southampton	Township	Burlington	10,314	44.0	234.6
Springfield Township	Township	Burlington	3,243	29.5	109.9
Tabernacle	Township	Burlington	6,779	49.2	6,851
Washington Township	Township	Burlington	692	101.7	6.8
Westampton	Township	Burlington	9,119	11.0	831.0
Willingboro	Township	Burlington	31,889	7.7	4,127.8
Woodland Township	Township	Burlington	1,544	92.6	16.7
Wrightstown	Borough	Burlington	718	1.9	388.0
Audubon	Borough	Camden	8,710	1.5	5,876.6
Audubon Park	Borough	Camden	989	0.2	6,574.6
Barrington	Borough	Camden	7,066	1.6	4,468.7
Bellmawr	Borough	Camden	11,709	3.0	3,923.5
Berlin	Borough	Camden	7,490	3.6	2,084.2
Berlin Township	Township	Camden	5,866	3.3	1,755.0
Brooklawn	Borough	Camden	1,810	0.5	3,705.5
Camden	City	Camden	71,777	8.9	8,045.5
Cherry Hill	Township	Camden	74,536	24.1	3,096.4
Chesilhurst	Borough	Camden	1,533	1.7	893.7
Clementon	Borough	Camden	5,345	1.9	2,823.9
Collingswood	Borough	Camden	14,181	1.8	7,749.1
Gibbsboro	Borough	Camden	2,188	2.2	1,016.7
Gloucester Township	Township	Camden	66,031	23.0	2,876.6
Gloucester City	City	Camden	11,490	2.3	4,963.8
Haddon Township	Township	Camden	15,420	2.7	5,727.6
Haddonfield	Borough	Camden	12,550	2.8	4,488.1
Haddon Heights	Borough	Camden	7,501	1.6	4,789.1
Hi-Nella	Borough	Camden	927	0.2	4,165.1
Laurel Springs	Borough	Camden	1,980	0.5	4,385.9
Lawnside	Borough	Camden	2,956	1.4	2,066.5
Lindenwold	Borough	Camden	21,641	3.9	5,546.1
Magnolia	Borough	Camden	4,350	1.0	4,445.8
Merchantville	Borough	Camden	3,821	0.6	6,438.7
Mount Ephraim	Borough	Camden	4,658	0.9	5,269.2
Oaklyn	Borough	Camden	3,932	0.6	6,268.9
Pennsauken	Township	Camden	37,085	10.5	3,539.1
Pine Hill	Borough	Camden	10,769	3.9	2,753.8
Runnemede	Borough	Camden	8,327	2.1	4,059.9
Somerdale	Borough	Camden	5,561	1.4	3,995.1
Stratford	Borough	Camden	6,965	1.6	4,443.5
Tavistock	Borough	Camden	7	0.3	25.7
Voorhees	Township	Camden	31,065	11.5	2,708.1
Waterford Township	Township	Camden	10,422	36.0	289.5
Winslow Township	Township	Camden	39,910	57.4	695.1
Woodlynne	Borough	Camden	2,905	0.2	13,352.2
Bridgeton	City	Cumberland	27,270	6.2	4,378.3
Commercial Township	Township	Cumberland	4,672	31.9	146.4
Deerfield Township	Township	Cumberland	3,133	16.8	186.0
Downe Township	Township	Cumberland	1,400	48.4	28.9
Fairfield Township	Township	Cumberland	5,545	41.1	134.9
Greenwich Township	Township	Cumberland	769	17.8	43.3
Hopewell Township	Township	Cumberland	4,389	29.9	146.8
Lawrence Township	Township	Cumberland	3,084	36.9	83.5
Maurice River	Township	Cumberland	6,209	93.2	66.6
Millville	City	Cumberland	27,492	42.0	654.6
Shiloh	Borough	Cumberland	443	1.2	368.2
Stow Creek Township	Township	Cumberland	1,317	18.3	72.1
Upper Deerfield Township	Township	Cumberland	7,645	31.2	244.7
Clayton	Borough	Gloucester	8,805	7.1	1,244.6
Deptford	Township	Gloucester	31,976	17.3	1,845.0
East Greenwich Township	Township	Gloucester	11,705	14.4	810.4
Elk Township	Township	Gloucester	4,424	19.2	230.9
Franklin Township	Township	Gloucester	16,384	55.8	293.5
Glassboro	Borough	Gloucester	23,146	9.3	2,483.4
Greenwich Township	Township	Gloucester	4,914	9.0	547.1
Harrison Township	Township	Gloucester	13,640	18.9	720.5
Logan Township	Township	Gloucester	5,999	21.9	273.6
Mantua Township	Township	Gloucester	15,235	16.0	951.9
Monroe Township	Township	Gloucester	37,113	46.4	799.5
National Park	Borough	Gloucester	3,031	1.0	3,008.7
Newfield	Borough	Gloucester	1,776	1.7	1,021.8
Paulsboro	Borough	Gloucester	6,192	1.9	3,217.5
Pitman	Borough	Gloucester	8,782	2.2	3,958.9
South Harrison Township	Township	Gloucester	3,392	15.9	213.4
Swedesboro	Borough	Gloucester	2,709	0.7	3,704.7
Washington Township	Township	Gloucester	48,681	21.3	2,280.5
Wenonah	Borough	Gloucester	2,281	1.0	2,291.0
West Deptford	Township	Gloucester	22,202	15.4	1,445.7
Westville	Borough	Gloucester	4,264	1.0	4,165.2
Woodbury	City	Gloucester	9,958	2.0	4,930.3
Woodbury Heights	Borough	Gloucester	3,098	1.2	2,486.0
Woolwich Township	Township	Gloucester	12,578	21.1	596.9
Alloway Township	Township	Salem	3,284	33.5	98.1
Carneys Point	Township	Salem	8,643	16.9	511.1
Elmer	Borough	Salem	1,344	0.9	1,503.9
Elsinboro Township	Township	Salem	1,000	11.9	83.8
Lower Alloways Creek	Town	Salem	1,716	45.3	37.9
Mannington Township	Township	Salem	1,474	33.9	43.5
Oldmans Township	Township	Salem	1,909	19.5	97.8
Penns Grove	Borough	Salem	4,838	0.9	5,419.9
Pennsville	Township	Salem	12,681	21.3	596.3
Pilesgrove Township	Township	Salem	4,185	34.9	119.8
Pittsgrove Township	Township	Salem	8,772	44.9	195.4
Quinton Township	Township	Salem	2,579	23.8	108.4
Salem	City	Salem	5,298	2.3	2,259.8
Upper Pittsgrove	Township	Salem	3,430	40.2	85.2
Woodstown	Borough	Salem	3,681	1.6	2,337.3
