= Stow Creek =

Stow Creek may refer to:

- Stow Creek (New Jersey), a tributary of Delaware Bay in southern New Jersey
- Stow Creek Township, New Jersey, in Cumberland County
- Stow Creek School District, in Cumberland County, New Jersey
- Stow Creek, a tributary of the River Crouch, Essex, England
