= Jericho, New Jersey =

Jericho, New Jersey may refer to:

- Jericho, Cumberland County, New Jersey
- Jericho, Gloucester County, New Jersey
