= Greenwich Historic District =

Historic district in New Jersey, United States

- U.S. National Register of Historic Places
- U.S. Historic district
- New Jersey Register of Historic Places
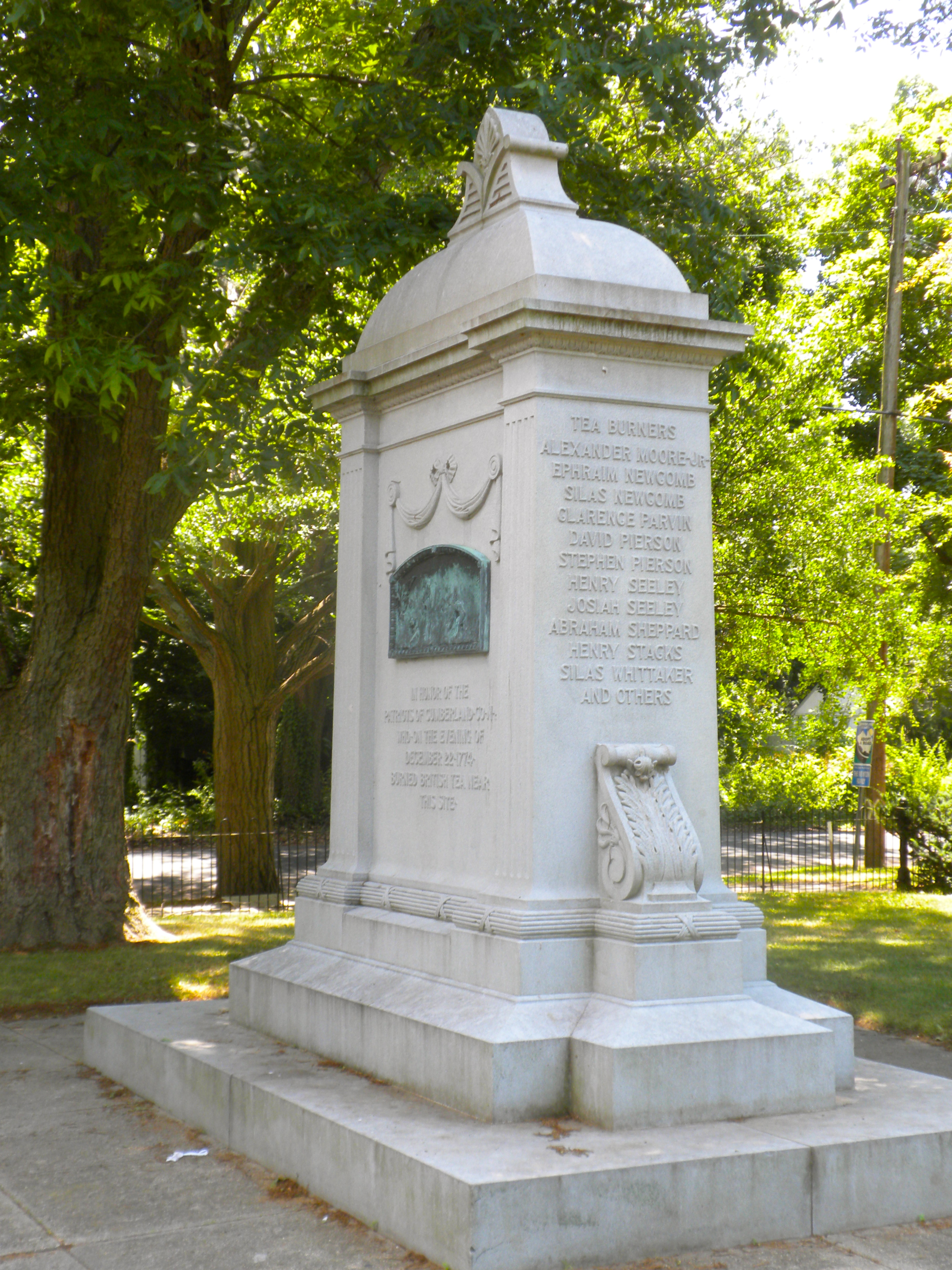
- Greenwich Tea Burning Monument

- Location within Cumberland County, New Jersey Location within New Jersey Location within the United States
- Location: Main Street from Cohansey River north to Othello, Greenwich Township, Cumberland County, New Jersey
- Coordinates: 39°23′51″N 75°20′25″W
- Area: 350 acres (140 ha)
- Architectural style: Colonial, Federal, Dutch Colonial
- NRHP reference No.: 72000772 (original); 100007645 (increase)
- NJRHP No.: 1044

Significant dates
- Added to NRHP: January 20, 1972
- Boundary increase: August 12, 2024
- Designated NJRHP: November 30, 1971

The Greenwich Historic District is a historic district located in the Greenwich section of Greenwich Township in Cumberland County, New Jersey, United States. When originally listed, it extended from the Cohansey River north toward the neighboring settlement of Othello. The district was added to the National Register of Historic Places on January 20, 1972, for its significance in agriculture, architecture, commerce, and politics. It included 19 contributing buildings, many documented by the Historic American Buildings Survey (HABS). A boundary revision was approved on August 12, 2024.

== History and description ==
The Greenwich Tea Party of December 22, 1774 is commemorated with the Greenwich Tea Burning Monument erected in 1908. The Old Friends Meeting House is a two-story brick building that was built in 1779 by the Quakers. The Richard Wood House is a two-story brick building constructed in 1795 by the merchant Richard Wood 3rd.

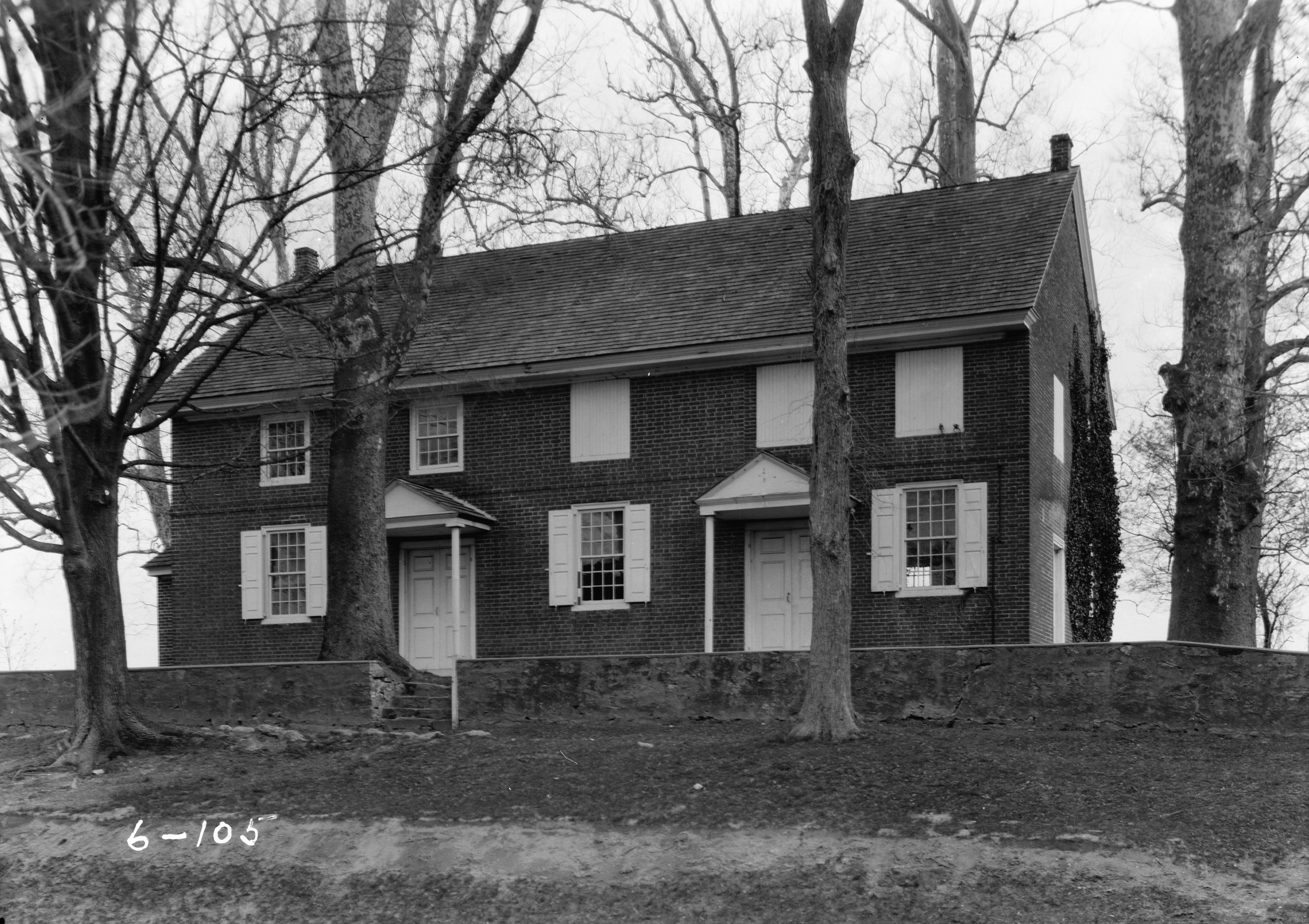
Old Friends Meeting House, HABS photo from 1936

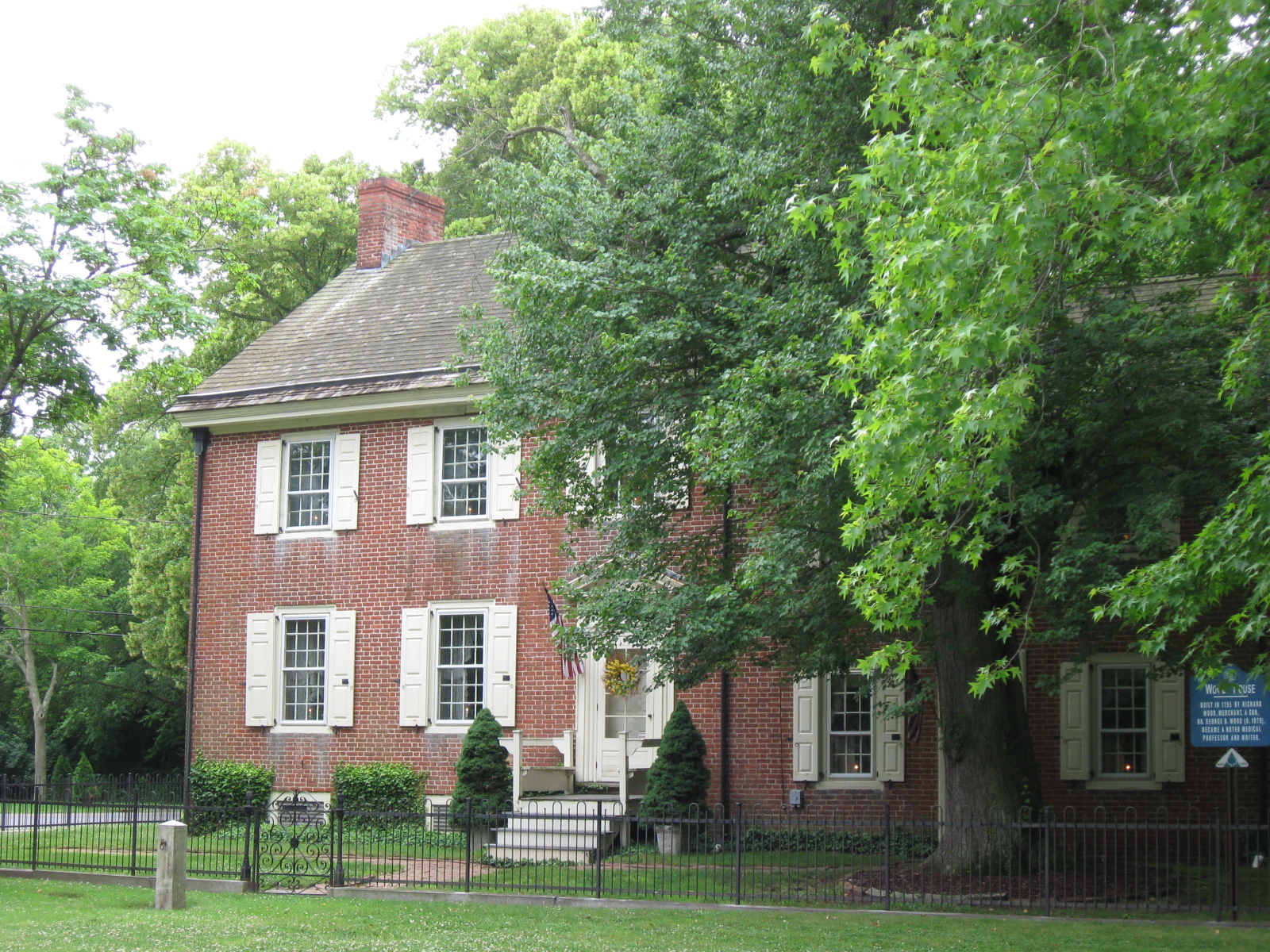
Richard Wood House

== See also ==
- National Register of Historic Places listings in Cumberland County, New Jersey
