= Marlboro, New Jersey (disambiguation) =

Marlboro is the name of several places in the state of New Jersey in the United States of America:

- Marlboro Township, New Jersey, in Monmouth County
  - The community of Marlboro, Monmouth County, New Jersey
- Marlboro, Burlington County, New Jersey
- Marlboro (CDP), New Jersey, in Cumberland County
