= Jericho, Cumberland County, New Jersey =

Populated place in Cumberland County, New Jersey, US

Jericho, New Jersey
- Unincorporated community
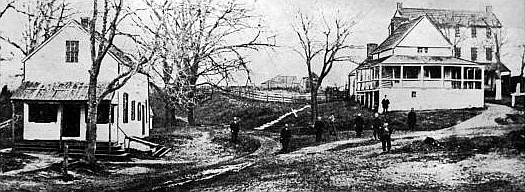
- Jericho Hotel, circa 1890

- Location in Cumberland County (Inset: Cumberland County in New Jersey) Jericho (New Jersey) Jericho (the United States)
- Coordinates: 39°28′12″N 75°21′06″W
- Country: United States
- State: New Jersey
- County: Cumberland
- Township: Stow Creek
- Elevation: 30 ft (9.1 m)
- Time zone: UTC−05:00 (Eastern (EST))
  - Summer (DST): UTC−04:00 (EDT)
- GNIS feature ID: 877447

Jericho is a community located within Stow Creek Township, in Cumberland County, in the U.S. state of New Jersey.

Stow Creek, a tributary of the Delaware River, flows through the settlement, and a pond and dam are located there.

Jericho was at one time an important mill town in the history of Cumberland and Salem counties.

== History ==
Originally called "Gravelly Run", the settlement began to flourish in 1680 when John Brick purchased 1,000 acres (400 ha) of land bordering Stow Creek, and erected sawmills and gristmills. The Jericho Hotel was built, and in 1818, a distillery located in Jericho was converted into a woolen factory.

The geologic area around Jericho contains Miocene epoch marl, and it is rich with fossils. In the early 1800s, farmers near Jericho began using the mudlike marl found along Stow Creek as fertilizer, and commercial marl pits were built.
