= Marlboro (CDP), New Jersey =

Populated place in Cumberland County, New Jersey, US

Marlboro, New Jersey
- Census-designated place
- Location in Cumberland County Location in New Jersey Location in the United States
- Coordinates: 39°29′8″N 75°19′11″W
- Country: United States
- State: New Jersey
- County: Cumberland
- Township: Stow Creek

Area
  - Total: 0.39 sq mi (1.00 km^{2})
  - Land: 0.39 sq mi (1.00 km^{2})
  - Water: 0 sq mi (0.00 km^{2})
- Elevation: 117 ft (36 m)

Population (2020)
  - Total: 127
  - Density: 329/sq mi (127.2/km^{2})
- Time zone: UTC−05:00 (Eastern (EST))
  - Summer (DST): UTC−04:00 (EDT)
- ZIP Code: 08302 (Bridgeton)
- Area code: 856
- FIPS code: 34-44010
- GNIS feature ID: 2806123

Marlboro is a census-designated place (CDP) located in Stow Creek Township on the northwestern edge of Cumberland County, in the U.S. state of New Jersey. It is bordered to the northwest, across Sarah Run, by Quinton Township in Salem County. The CDP contains the unincorporated communities of Marlboro and Campbells Corner.

New Jersey Route 49 passes through the CDP, leading southeast 6 miles (10 km) to Bridgeton, the Cumberland county seat, and northwest 10 miles (16 km) to Salem.

== Demographics ==
Historical population
Census	Pop.	Note	%±
2020	127		—
U.S. Decennial Census; 2020

Marlboro was first listed as a census designated place in the 2020 U.S. census.

Marlboro CDP, New Jersey – Racial and ethnic composition Note: the US Census treats Hispanic/Latino as an ethnic category. This table excludes Latinos from the racial categories and assigns them to a separate category. Hispanics/Latinos may be of any race.
Race / Ethnicity (NH = Non-Hispanic)	Pop 2020	2020
White alone (NH)	99	77.95%
Black or African American alone (NH)	9	7.09%
Native American or Alaska Native alone (NH)	3	2.36%
Asian alone (NH)	0	0.00%
Native Hawaiian or Pacific Islander alone (NH)	0	0.00%
Other race alone (NH)	2	1.57%
Mixed race or Multiracial (NH)	6	4.72%
Hispanic or Latino (any race)	8	6.30%
Total	127	100.00%

As of 2020, the population was 127.

== Education ==
Students are zoned to Stow Creek Township School District (for elementary school) and Cumberland Regional School District (for high school).

The Stow Creek school district and the Greenwich Township School District have a cooperative agreement in which all students in grade levels Kindergarten through 4 in both school districts attend the Greenwich Township school facility, Morris Goodwin School, while all students in grades 5-8 in both school districts attend the Stow Creek school facility, Stow Creek School.
