= Greenwich (CDP), New Jersey =

Greenwich is the name of two census-designated places in the U.S. state of New Jersey:

- Greenwich (CDP), Cumberland County, New Jersey
- Greenwich (CDP), Warren County, New Jersey
