= Swansea Vineyards =

American winery located in New Jersey

Coordinates: 39.455110°N 75.292750°W

- Location: 860 Main Street (Route 49), Shiloh, NJ, USA
- Coordinates: 39.455110 N, 75.292750 W
- Appellation: Outer Coastal Plain AVA
- First vines planted: 1994
- Opened to the public: 2007
- Key people: Frank Baitinger (owner); Jennifer Spiker (manager)
- Area cultivated: 12
- Cases/yr: 2,000 (2011)
- Other attractions: Picnicking permitted
- Distribution: NJ liquor stores
- Tasting: No tasting room
- Website: http://www.swanseavineyards.com/

Swansea Vineyards is a winery in Shiloh in Cumberland County, New Jersey. Formerly a produce farm, the vineyard was first planted in 1994, and opened to the public in 2007. Swansea has 12 acres of grapes under cultivation, and producing 2,000 cases of wine per year. The winery is named for the original settlers of Shiloh who were Seventh Day Baptists from Swansea, Wales.

== Wines ==
Swansea Vineyards is located in the Outer Coastal Plain AVA, and produces wine from Cabernet Franc, Cabernet Sauvignon, Cayuga White, Chambourcin, Chardonnay, Lakemont, Merlot, Reliance, Traminette, and Vidal blanc grapes. Swansea also makes fruit wines from apples, blackberries, blueberries, kiwifruit, nectarines, peaches, and strawberries. It is the only winery in New Jersey that produces wine from Lakemont and Reliance, which are seedless table grapes developed in New York and Arkansas, respectively.

== Licensing, associations, and distribution ==
Swansea has a farm winery license from the New Jersey Division of Alcoholic Beverage Control, which allows it to produce up to 50,000 gallons of wine, operate up to 15 off-premises sales rooms, and ship up to 12 cases per year to consumers in-state or out-of-state. The winery is not a member of the Garden State Wine Growers Association or the Outer Coastal Plain Vineyard Association. Swansea does not have a tasting room, but distributes their wines through liquor stores in New Jersey.

== Controversy ==
Swansea formerly had conflicts with municipal authorities. Shiloh is a dry town with a strong religious heritage, and there was opposition from the Shiloh borough council to the sale of wine in the town. The Seventh Day Baptist Church of Shiloh wrote a letter to the state Alcoholic Beverage Commission (ABC) objecting to Swansea's application for a winery license. A compromise was reached between the winery and the borough council wherein the town dropped its opposition to the winery, and Swansea agreed to only permit wine tastings, and not the sale of wine by the glass.

== See also ==
- Alcohol laws of New Jersey
- American wine
- Judgment of Princeton
- List of wineries, breweries, and distilleries in New Jersey
- New Jersey Farm Winery Act
- New Jersey Wine Industry Advisory Council
- New Jersey wine
