= Greenwich Township =

Greenwich Township may refer to one of the following places in the United States:

- Greenwich Township, Cumberland County, New Jersey
- Greenwich Township, Gloucester County, New Jersey
- Greenwich Township, Warren County, New Jersey
- Greenwich Township, Huron County, Ohio
- Greenwich Township, Pennsylvania
