= Greenwich (CDP), Cumberland County, New Jersey =

Populated place in Cumberland County, New Jersey, US

Greenwich, New Jersey
- Census-designated place
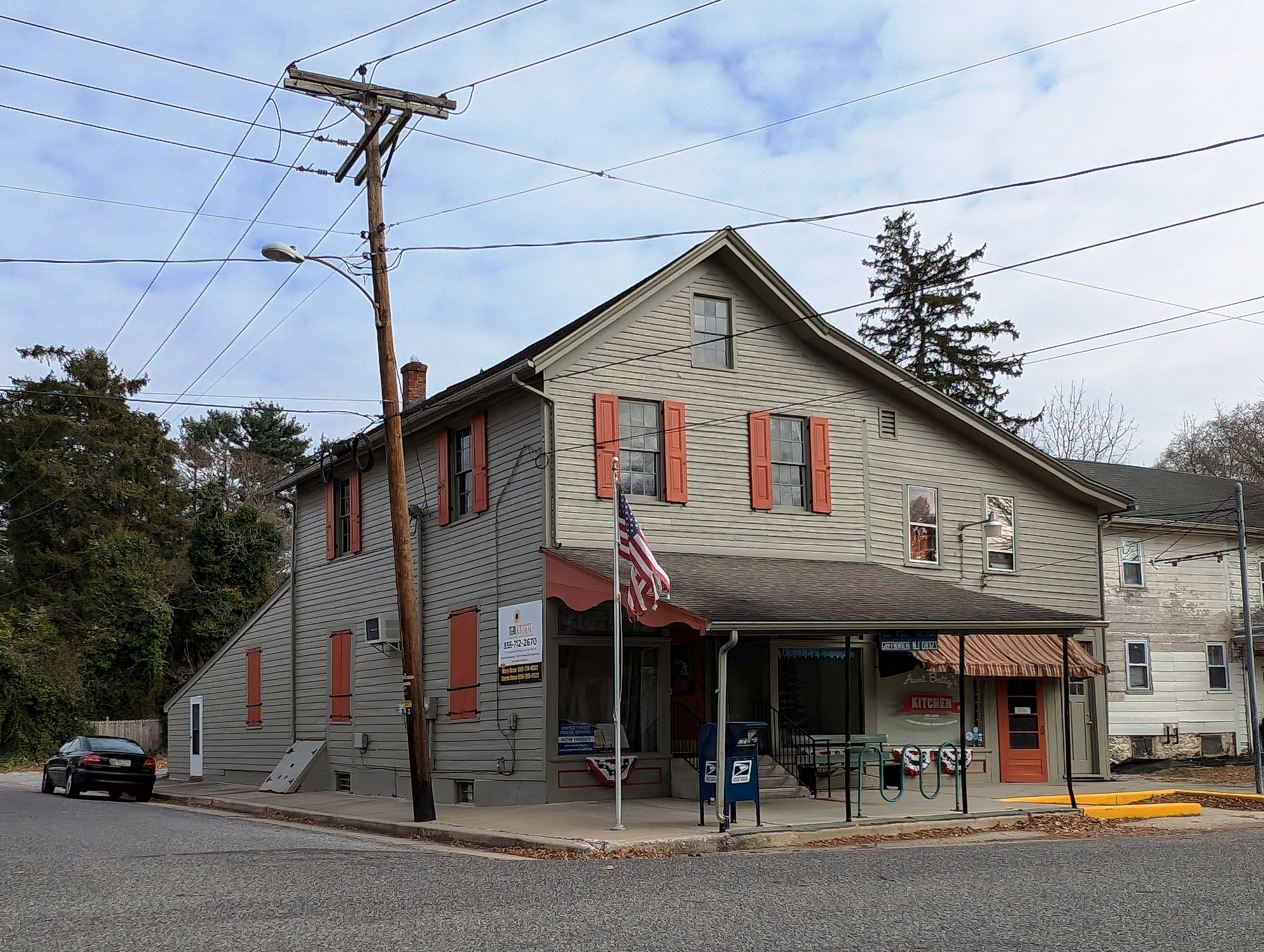
- Greenwich post office

- Location in Cumberland County Location in New Jersey Location in the United States
- Coordinates: 39°23′22″N 75°20′20″W
- Country: United States
- State: New Jersey
- County: Cumberland
- Township: Greenwich

Area
  - Total: 0.84 sq mi (2.18 km^{2})
  - Land: 0.84 sq mi (2.17 km^{2})
  - Water: 0.0039 sq mi (0.01 km^{2})
- Elevation: 14 ft (4.3 m)

Population (2020)
  - Total: 251
  - Density: 299.0/sq mi (115.44/km^{2})
- Time zone: UTC−05:00 (Eastern (EST))
  - Summer (DST): UTC−04:00 (EDT)
- ZIP Code: 08323
- Area code: 856
- FIPS code: 34-28140
- GNIS feature ID: 2806092

Greenwich is an unincorporated community and census-designated place (CDP) in Cumberland County, in the U.S. state of New Jersey. It is in the western part of the county, in the southeast part of Greenwich Township, on the northwest side of the tidal Cohansey River, 4 miles (6 km) northeast of its mouth at Delaware Bay. The community is 7 miles (11 km) southwest of Bridgeton, the county seat.

Greenwich was first listed as a CDP prior to the 2020 census. The area along both sides of Ye Greate Street, the main street in the community, comprises the Greenwich Historic District, listed on the National Register of Historic Places. The district continues north to the community of Othello.

== Demographics ==
Historical population
| Census | Pop. | Note | %± |
|---|---|---|---|
| 2020 | 251 | | — |
U.S. Decennial Census; 2020

Greenwich was first listed as a census designated place in the 2020 U.S. census.

Greenwich CDP, Cumberland County, New Jersey – Racial and ethnic composition Note: the US Census treats Hispanic/Latino as an ethnic category. This table excludes Latinos from the racial categories and assigns them to a separate category. Hispanics/Latinos may be of any race.
| Race / Ethnicity (NH = Non-Hispanic) | Pop 2020 | 2020 |
|---|---|---|
| White alone (NH) | 238 | 94.82% |
| Black or African American alone (NH) | 3 | 1.20% |
| Native American or Alaska Native alone (NH) | 1 | 0.40% |
| Asian alone (NH) | 0 | 0.00% |
| Native Hawaiian or Pacific Islander alone (NH) | 0 | 0.00% |
| Other race alone (NH) | 0 | 0.00% |
| Mixed race or Multiracial (NH) | 7 | 2.79% |
| Hispanic or Latino (any race) | 2 | 0.80% |
| Total | 251 | 100.00% |

As of 2020, the population was 251.

== Education ==
Students are zoned to Greenwich Township School District (for elementary school) and Cumberland Regional School District (for high school).

The Greenwich school district and the Stow Creek Township School District have a cooperative agreement in which all students in grade levels Kindergarten through 4 in both school districts attend the Greenwich Township school facility, Morris Goodwin School, while all students in grades 5-8 in both school districts attend the Stow Creek school facility, Stow Creek School.
