= Columbia Township, New Jersey =

Former township in New Jersey, United States

Coordinates: 39°25′54″N 75°17′26″W

Columbia Township was a rather short-lived township that existed in Cumberland County, New Jersey, United States, from 1844 to 1845.

Columbia Township was incorporated by an Act of the New Jersey Legislature on March 8, 1844 entitled, "Act entitled, "An act to establish a new township in the county of Cumberland, to be called Columbia." Columbia was derived from portions of both Hopewell Township and Stoe Creek:

Sec. 1. Be it Enacted, by the Council and General Assembly of this State, and it is hereby enacted by the authority of the same, That all that part of the townships of Hopewell and Stoe Creek, in the county of Cumberland, which is within the county of Columbia, which is in the following limits, to wit: Beginning at the cross roads at Roadstown, following the middle of the new road that leads to Bridgeton, which road bears south seventy-six and three quarter degrees east, from where the new road leaves the old road, and follow the said new road until it intersects the cross road leading from Bowentown to Barrett's run, near the house where Jacob Souder now lives; thence up said road north seven and three quarter degrees east to Barrett's run; then following the road leading to the Elmer farm or Ebenezer Davis' house, the several courses of said road until it intersects the road leading from the commissioners road to Seely's mill; then following it, bearing south sixty-four and three quarter degrees west the several courses thereof until it intersects the commissioners road at Columbia; thence up the commissioners road and the several courses of the line of the township of Hopewell, until it intersects the Salem county line; then along said line until it intersects the road leading to Davis' mill; then down said road the several courses thereof, until it, intersects the road leading direct from Wood's mills to Roadstown; thence down the said road to Roadstown, the place of beginning, shall be, and the same is hereby set off from the townships of Hopewell and Stoe Creek, and established, into a new township, to be called the township of "Columbia."

On March 13, 1845, just one day shy of its first anniversary, the township was dissolved and its territory restored whence it came.
