= Stow Creek Township, New Jersey =

Township in Cumberland County, New Jersey, US

- Township
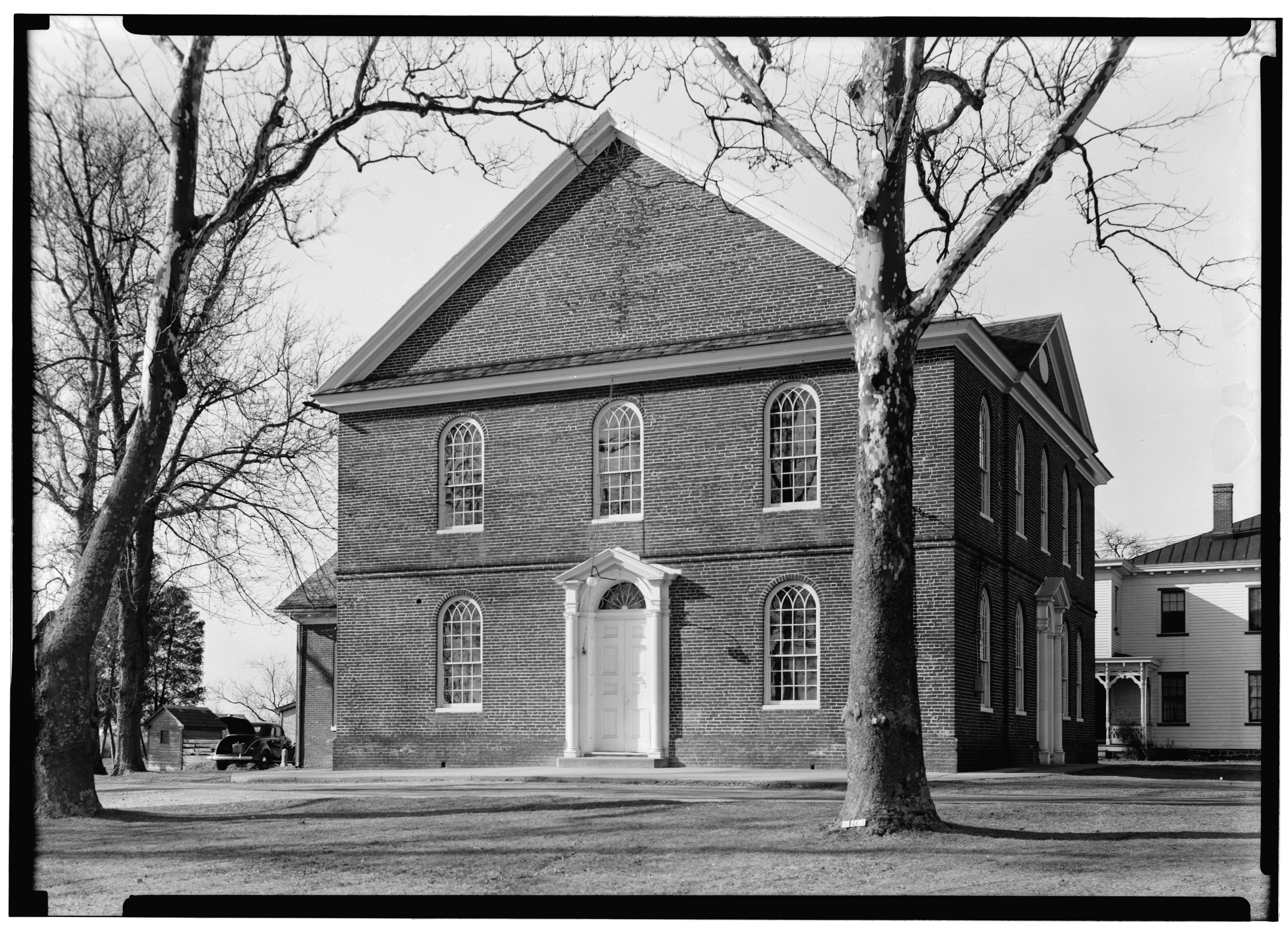
- Cohansey Baptist Church

- Seal

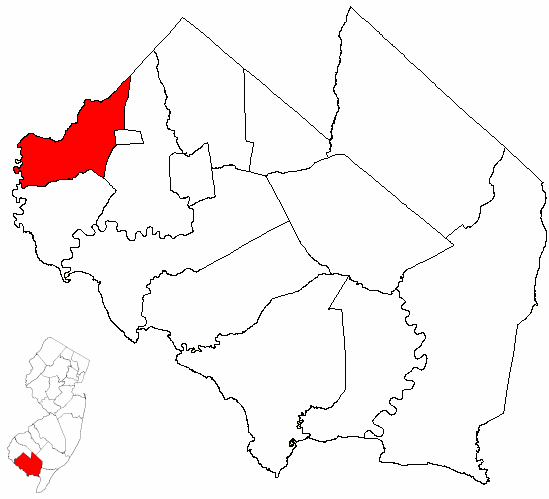
- Location of Stow Creek Township in Cumberland County highlighted in red (right). Inset map: Location of Cumberland County in New Jersey highlighted in red (left).

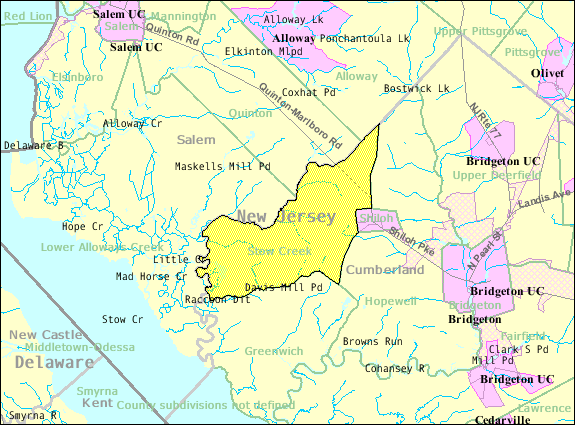
- Census Bureau map of Stow Creek Township, New Jersey

- Location in Cumberland County Location in New Jersey Location in the United States
- Coordinates: 39.456196°N 75.355016°W
- Country: United States
- State: New Jersey
- County: Cumberland
- Formed: January 19, 1748
- Incorporated: February 21, 1798

Government
  - Type: Township
  - Body: Township Committee
  - Mayor: Dale F. Cruzan Sr. (R, term ends December 31, 2023)
  - Municipal clerk: Bruce Porter

Area
  - Total: 18.89 sq mi (48.93 km^{2})
  - Land: 18.27 sq mi (47.31 km^{2})
  - Water: 0.63 sq mi (1.62 km^{2}) 3.32%
  - Rank: 151st of 565 in state 10th of 14 in county
- Elevation: 69 ft (21 m)

Population (2020)
  - Total: 1,312
  - Estimate (2023): 1,317
  - Rank: 522nd of 565 in state 12th of 14 in county
  - Density: 71.8/sq mi (27.7/km^{2})
  - Rank: 549th of 565 in state 11th of 14 in county
- Time zone: UTC−05:00 (Eastern (EST))
  - Summer (DST): UTC−04:00 (Eastern (EDT))
- ZIP Code: 08302 – Bridgeton
- Area code: 856
- FIPS code: 3401171160
- GNIS feature ID: 0882057
- Website: stowcreektwp.org

1862 map of Cumberland County

Stow Creek Township is a township in Cumberland County, in the U.S. state of New Jersey. It is part of the Vineland-Bridgeton metropolitan statistical area for statistical purposes. As of the 2020 United States census, the township's population was 1,312, a decrease of 119 (−8.3%) from the 2010 census count of 1,431, which in turn reflected an increase of two people (+0.1%) from the 1,429 counted in the 2000 census.

It is a dry township, where alcohol is not permitted to be sold by law.

== History ==
Stow Creek dates back to January 19, 1748, when it was formed as one of six precincts in the newly created Cumberland County. It was formally incorporated as a township on February 21, 1798.

As part of a political battle over the site of the county seat for Cumberland County, Columbia Township was formed on March 12, 1844, from portions of Hopewell and Stow Creek Townships; the short-lived municipality included all of present-day Shiloh, in addition to extensive additional land, but all was returned to its original home when Columbia Township was dissolved on March 11, 1845, surviving as an independent municipality for a day short of one year.

The spelling of the township's name was changed from "Stoe Creek" to "Stow Creek" on October 1, 1924.

On April 9, 1929, portions of the township were taken to create Shiloh. On October 1, 1924, the New Jersey Legislature officially changed the name of the township from "Stoe Creek" to "Stow Creek", though it is unclear when "Stow" had become "Stoe".

The township's name is shared with the Stow Creek, a tributary of the Delaware River.

== Geography ==
According to the United States Census Bureau, the township had a total area of 18.89 square miles (48.93 km^{2}), including 18.27 square miles (47.31 km^{2}) of land and 0.63 square miles (1.62 km^{2}) of water (3.32%).

Unincorporated communities, localities and place names located partially or completely within the township include Arrowhead Lake, Cumberland Causeway, Garrisons Corner, Gum Tree Corner, Jericho, Kernans Corner, Macanippock, Marlboro, Roadstown, Seventh Day Mill, Stow Creek Landing, Town Hall and Willis Corner.

The township borders the municipalities of Hopewell Township, Greenwich Township and Shiloh in Cumberland County; and Alloway Township, Lower Alloways Creek Township and Quinton Township in Salem County.

== Demographics ==
Historical population
Census	Pop.	Note	%±
1810	1,039		—
1820	884		−14.9%
1830	791		−10.5%
1840	846		7.0%
1850	1,093		29.2%
1860	1,267		15.9%
1870	1,122		−11.4%
1880	1,107		−1.3%
1890	972		−12.2%
1900	934		−3.9%
1910	880		−5.8%
1920	844		−4.1%
1930	796	*	−5.7%
1940	720		−9.5%
1950	957		32.9%
1960	1,010		5.5%
1970	1,050		4.0%
1980	1,365		30.0%
1990	1,437		5.3%
2000	1,429		−0.6%
2010	1,431		0.1%
2020	1,312		−8.3%
2023 (est.)	1,317		0.4%
Population sources: 1810–2010; 1810–1920 1840 1850–1870; 1850 1870 1880–1890; 1890–1910 1910–1930; 1940–2000 2000; 2010 2020 * = Lost territory in previous decade.

=== 2010 census ===
The 2010 United States census counted 1,431 people, 543 households, and 412 families in the township. The population density was 78.2 per square mile (30.2/km^{2}). There were 568 housing units at an average density of 31.0 per square mile (12.0/km^{2}). The racial makeup was 91.33% (1,307) White, 4.47% (64) Black or African American, 1.40% (20) Native American, 0.28% (4) Asian, 0.00% (0) Pacific Islander, 0.98% (14) from other races, and 1.54% (22) from two or more races. Hispanic or Latino of any race were 4.40% (63) of the population.

Of the 543 households, 26.2% had children under the age of 18; 61.7% were married couples living together; 8.7% had a female householder with no husband present and 24.1% were non-families. Of all households, 19.2% were made up of individuals and 9.9% had someone living alone who was 65 years of age or older. The average household size was 2.64 and the average family size was 3.01.

20.8% of the population were under the age of 18, 8.0% from 18 to 24, 21.5% from 25 to 44, 32.1% from 45 to 64, and 17.6% who were 65 years of age or older. The median age was 44.6 years. For every 100 females, the population had 101.0 males. For every 100 females ages 18 and older there were 97.9 males.

The Census Bureau's 2006–2010 American Community Survey showed that (in 2010 inflation-adjusted dollars) median household income was $71,333 (with a margin of error of +/− $7,849) and the median family income was $78,583 (+/− $7,836). Males had a median income of $52,500 (+/− $12,034) versus $38,036 (+/− $3,668) for females. The per capita income for the borough was $29,860 (+/− $3,146). About 4.1% of families and 6.8% of the population were below the poverty line, including 10.3% of those under age 18 and 4.3% of those age 65 or over.

=== 2000 census ===
As of the 2000 United States census there were 1,429 people, 536 households, and 425 families residing in the township. The population density was 77.5 inhabitants per square mile (29.9/km^{2}). There were 560 housing units at an average density of 30.4 per square mile (11.7/km^{2}). The racial makeup of the township was 93.42% White, 3.50% African American, 1.61% Native American, 0.21% Asian, 0.84% from other races, and 0.42% from two or more races. Hispanic or Latino of any race were 1.68% of the population.

There were 536 households, out of which 32.1% had children under the age of 18 living with them, 69.0% were married couples living together, 6.7% had a female householder with no husband present, and 20.7% were non-families. 17.9% of all households were made up of individuals, and 7.5% had someone living alone who was 65 years of age or older. The average household size was 2.67 and the average family size was 3.01.

In the township the population was spread out, with 23.5% under the age of 18, 7.2% from 18 to 24, 25.8% from 25 to 44, 29.0% from 45 to 64, and 14.5% who were 65 years of age or older. The median age was 41 years. For every 100 females, there were 96.8 males. For every 100 females age 18 and over, there were 92.8 males.

The median income for a household in the township was $52,500, and the median income for a family was $58,583. Males had a median income of $35,500 versus $26,528 for females. The per capita income for the township was $20,925. About 5.7% of families and 6.7% of the population were below the poverty line, including 8.1% of those under age 18 and 12.1% of those age 65 or over.

== Government ==
=== Local government ===
Stow Creek is governed under the Township form of New Jersey municipal government, one of 141 municipalities (of the 564) statewide that use this form, the second-most commonly used form of government in the state. The governing body is comprised of a three-member Township Committee, whose members are elected directly by the voters at-large in partisan elections to serve three-year terms of office on a staggered basis, with one seat coming up for election each year as part of the November general election in a three-year cycle. At an annual reorganization meeting, the Township Committee selects one of its members to serve as Mayor.

As of 2023, members of the Stow Creek Township Committee are Mayor Dale F. Cruzan Sr. (R, term on committee and as mayor ends December 31, 2023), Thomas R. Burton (R, 2025) and Dave Shivers (R, 2024).

The township does not have a formal municipal building. Township committee meetings are held in the municipal building of Shiloh.

=== Federal, state and county representation ===
Stow Creek Township is located in the 2nd Congressional District and is part of New Jersey's 3rd state legislative district.

For the 119th United States Congress, New Jersey's 2nd congressional district is represented by Jeff Van Drew (R, Dennis Township). New Jersey is represented in the United States Senate by Democrats Cory Booker (Newark, term ends 2027) and Andy Kim (Moorestown, term ends 2031).

For the 2026–2027 session, the 3rd legislative district of the New Jersey Legislature is represented in the State Senate by John Burzichelli (D, Paulsboro) and in the General Assembly by David Bailey (D, Woodstown) and Heather Simmons (D, Glassboro).

Cumberland County is governed by a Board of County Commissioners composed of seven members who are elected at large by the citizens of Cumberland County in partisan elections and serve staggered three-year terms in office, with either two or three seats coming up for election each year in a three-year cycle. Annually, the seven board members select a Director and Deputy Director for one-year terms. As of 2025, members of the Cumberland County Board of County Commissioners (with party affiliation, residence and term-end year listed in parentheses) are:

Douglas A. Albrecht (R, Vineland, 2025), Deputy Director Antonio Romero (R, Vineland, 2027), Sandra Taylor (R, Downe Township; 2026), Victoria Groetsch-Lods (R, Vineland, 2025), Arthur Marchand (R, Hopewell Township, 2026), James Sauro (R, Vineland, 2026) and Robert A. Austino (D, Bridgeton, 2027).

The county's constitutional officers are: Clerk Celeste Riley (D, Bridgeton, 2029), Sheriff Michael Donato (R, Bridgeton, 2026) and Surrogate Rudolph Luisi (R, Vineland, 2028).

=== Politics ===
As of March 2011, there were a total of 979 registered voters in Stow Creek Township, of which 200 (20.4%) were registered as Democrats, 362 (37.0%) were registered as Republicans and 416 (42.5%) were registered as Unaffiliated. There was one voter registered to another party.

Gubernatorial election results for Stow Creek Township
Year	Republican		Democratic		Third party(ies)	
Year	No.	%	No.	%	No.	%
2025	445	70.86%	181	28.82%	2	0.32%
2021	438	77.39%	126	22.26%	2	0.35%
2017	296	66.97%	135	30.54%	11	2.49%
2013	355	75.05%	114	24.10%	4	0.85%
2009	308	61.85%	148	29.72%	42	8.43%
2005	269	57.23%	177	37.66%	24	5.11%

In the 2012 presidential election, Republican Mitt Romney received 64.9% of the vote (447 cast), ahead of Democrat Barack Obama with 34.5% (238 votes), and other candidates with 0.6% (4 votes), among the 697 ballots cast by the township's 982 registered voters (8 ballots were spoiled), for a turnout of 71.0%. In the 2008 presidential election, Republican John McCain received 58.5% of the vote (431 cast), ahead of Democrat Barack Obama, who received 38.4% (283 votes), with 737 ballots cast among the township's 979 registered voters, for a turnout of 75.3%. In the 2004 presidential election, Republican George W. Bush received 64.6% of the vote (455 ballots cast), outpolling Democrat John Kerry, who received around 34.4% (242 votes), with 704 ballots cast among the township's 915 registered voters, for a turnout percentage of 76.9.

United States presidential election results for Stow Creek Township 2024 2020 2016 2012 2008 2004
Year	Republican		Democratic		Third party(ies)	
Year	No.	%	No.	%	No.	%
2024	567	72.69%	205	26.28%	8	1.03%
2020	590	69.74%	244	28.84%	12	1.42%
2016	489	69.17%	198	28.01%	20	2.83%
2012	447	64.88%	238	34.54%	4	0.58%
2008	431	58.48%	283	38.40%	23	3.12%
2004	455	64.63%	242	34.38%	7	0.99%

In the 2013 gubernatorial election, Republican Chris Christie received 75.1% of the vote (355 cast), ahead of Democrat Barbara Buono with 24.1% (114 votes), and other candidates with 0.8% (4 votes), among the 483 ballots cast by the township's 942 registered voters (10 ballots were spoiled), for a turnout of 51.3%. In the 2009 gubernatorial election, Republican Chris Christie received 60.6% of the vote (308 ballots cast), ahead of both Democrat Jon Corzine with 29.1% (148 votes) and Independent Chris Daggett with 6.3% (32 votes), with 508 ballots cast among the township's 962 registered voters, yielding a 52.8% turnout.

United States Senate election results for Stow Creek Township1
Year	Republican		Democratic		Third party(ies)	
Year	No.	%	No.	%	No.	%
2024	529	69.70%	209	27.54%	21	2.77%
2018	424	72.60%	144	24.66%	16	2.74%
2012	401	63.15%	226	35.59%	8	1.26%
2006	288	60.89%	176	37.21%	9	1.90%

United States Senate election results for Stow Creek Township2
Year	Republican		Democratic		Third party(ies)	
Year	No.	%	No.	%	No.	%
2020	570	68.51%	243	29.21%	19	2.28%
2014	308	66.52%	149	32.18%	6	1.30%
2013	202	73.19%	72	26.09%	2	0.72%
2008	406	59.79%	262	38.59%	11	1.62%

== Education ==
The Stow Creek School District serves public school students in kindergarten through eighth grade at Stow Creek School. As of the 2020–21 school year, the district, comprised of one school, had an enrollment of 125 students and 25.4 classroom teachers (on an FTE basis), for a student–teacher ratio of 4.9:1. In the 2016-17 school year, it had the 13th-smallest enrollment of any school district in the state. Under the Greenwich - Stow Creek Partnership established in 2009 with the Greenwich Township School District in Greenwich Township, students from both townships attend Morris Goodwin School for grades K-4 and Stow Creek School for grades 5-8.

Public school students in ninth through twelfth grades attend Cumberland Regional High School, which also serves students from Deerfield Township, Fairfield Township, Greenwich Township, Hopewell Township, Shiloh Borough and Upper Deerfield Township. As of the 2022–23 school year, the high school had an enrollment of 1,124 students and 82.0 classroom teachers (on an FTE basis), for a student–teacher ratio of 13.7:1. The high school district has a nine-member board of education, with board seats allocated to the constituent municipalities based on population, with each municipality assigned a minimum of one seat; Stow Creek Township has one seat on the board.

Students are also eligible to attend Cumberland County Technical Education Center in Vineland, serving students from the entire county in its full-time technical training programs, which are offered without charge to students who are county residents.

== Transportation ==
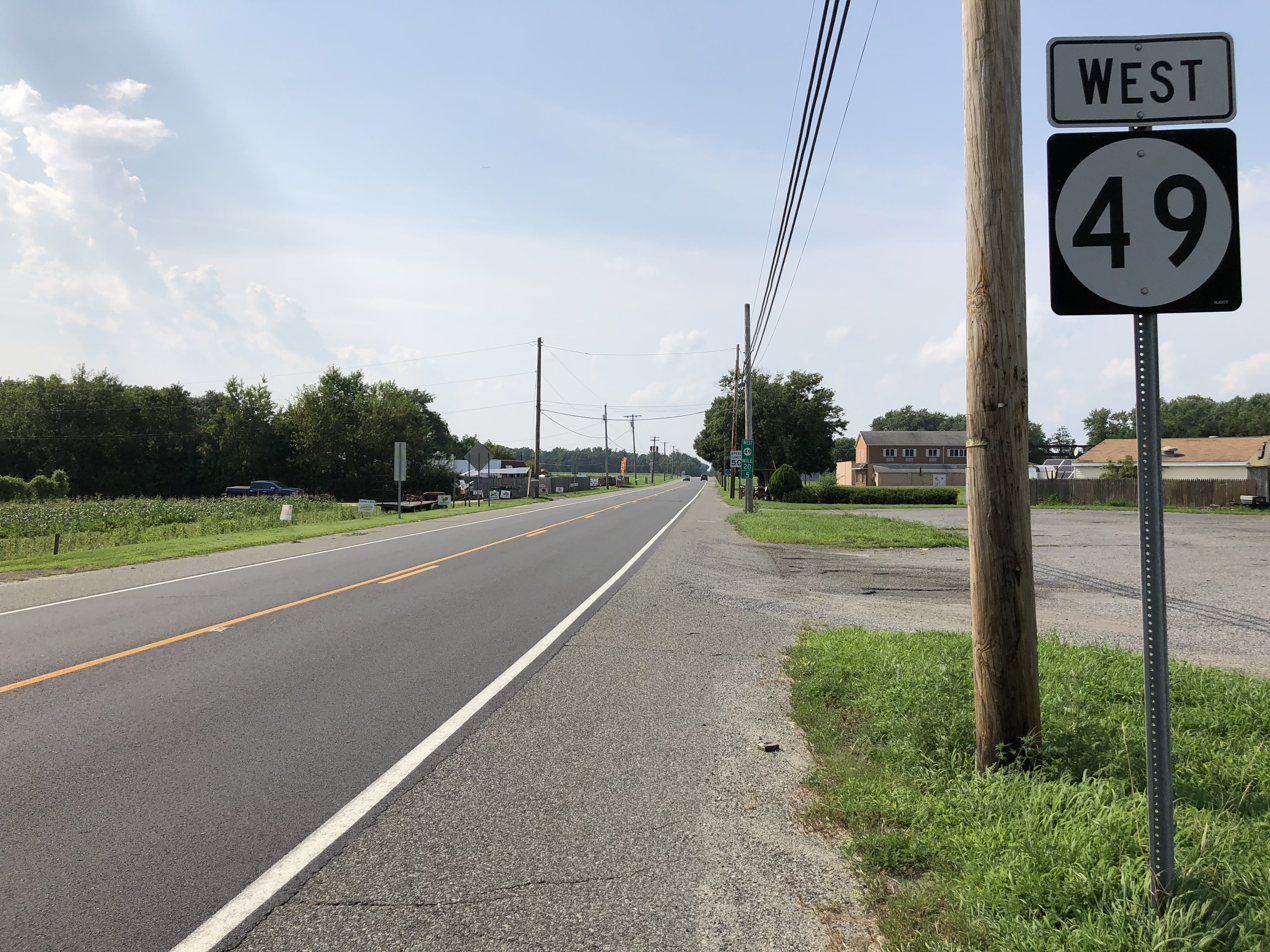
Route 49 westbound in Stow Creek

As of May 2010, the township had a total of 44.04 miles (70.88 km) of roadways, of which 10.66 miles (17.16 km) were maintained by the municipality, 31.24 miles (50.28 km) by Cumberland County and 2.14 miles (3.44 km) by the New Jersey Department of Transportation.

New Jersey Route 49 is the main highway providing access to Stow Creek.
