= Greenwich Township School District (Cumberland County, New Jersey) =

School district in Cumberland County, New Jersey, US

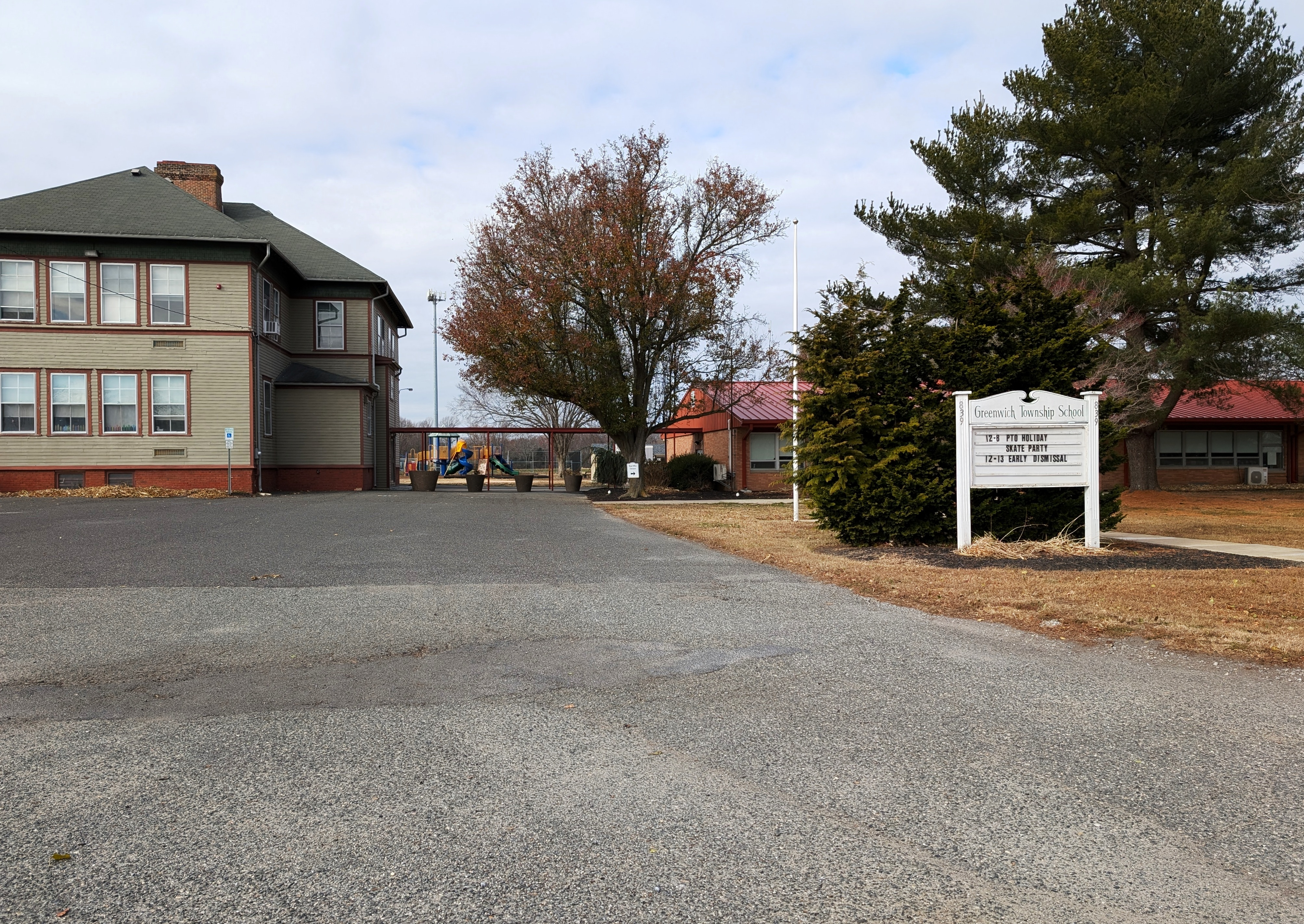
- Morris Goodwin School, the only school in the district

Address
- 839 Ye Greate Street Greenwich Township, Cumberland County, New Jersey, 08323; United States
- Coordinates: 39.400927°N 75.343354°W

District information
- Grades: K-8
- Superintendent: John Klug
- Business administrator: Cherie Bratty
- Schools: 1

Students and staff
- Enrollment: 82 (as of 2022–23)
- Faculty: 22.6 FTEs
- Student–teacher ratio: 3.6:1

Other information
- District Factor Group: CD
- Website: District website
| Ind. | Per pupil | District spending | Rank (*) | K-8 average | %± vs. average |
|---|---|---|---|---|---|
| 1A | Total Spending | $18,105 | 35 | $18,891 | −4.2% |
| 1 | Budgetary Cost | 15,616 | 42 | 14,159 | 10.3% |
| 2 | Classroom Instruction | 8,584 | 25 | 8,659 | −0.9% |
| 6 | Support Services | 2,526 | 37 | 2,167 | 16.6% |
| 8 | Administrative Cost | 1,253 | 4 | 1,547 | −19.0% |
| 10 | Operations & Maintenance | 2,850 | 62 | 1,612 | 76.8% |
| 13 | Extracurricular Activities | 92 | 22 | 104 | −11.5% |
| 16 | Median Teacher Salary | 53,635 | 16 | 61,136 |
Data from NJDoE 2014 Taxpayers' Guide to Education Spending. *Of K-8 districts with up to 400 students. Lowest spending=1; Highest=71

The Greenwich Township School District is a community public school district that serves students in kindergarten through eighth grade from Greenwich Township, in Cumberland County, in the U.S. state of New Jersey.

Under the terms of the Greenwich - Stow Creek Partnership established in 2009 with the Stow Creek School District in Stow Creek Township, New Jersey, students from both townships attend Morris Goodwin School for grades K-4 and Stow Creek School for grades 5-8.

As of the 2022–23 school year, the district, comprising one school, had an enrollment of 82 students and 22.6 classroom teachers (on an FTE basis), for a student–teacher ratio of 3.6:1. In the 2016-17 school year, it had 62 students, the second-smallest enrollment of any school district in the state.

The district is classified by the New Jersey Department of Education as being in District Factor Group "CD", the sixth-highest of eight groupings. District Factor Groups organize districts statewide to allow comparison by common socioeconomic characteristics of the local districts. From lowest socioeconomic status to highest, the categories are A, B, CD, DE, FG, GH, I and J.

Public school students in ninth through twelfth grades attend Cumberland Regional High School, which also serves students from Deerfield Township, Fairfield Township, Hopewell Township, Shiloh Borough, Stow Creek Township and Upper Deerfield Township. As of the 2018–19 school year, the high school had an enrollment of 1,043 students and 78.5 classroom teachers (on an FTE basis), for a student–teacher ratio of 13.3:1.

== School ==
Morris Goodwin School served an enrollment of 61 students in grades PreK-8 (as of the 2018–19 school year).

== Administration ==
Core members of the district's administration are:

- John Klug, superintendent
- Cherie Bratty, business administrator and board secretary

== Board of education ==
The district's board of education, comprised of nine members, sets policy and oversees the fiscal and educational operation of the district through its administration. As a Type II school district, the board's trustees are elected directly by voters to serve three-year terms of office on a staggered basis, with three seats up for election each year held (since 2014) as part of the November general election. The board appoints a superintendent to oversee the district's day-to-day operations and a business administrator to supervise the business functions of the district.
