= Shiloh, New Jersey =

Borough in Cumberland County, New Jersey, US

- Borough
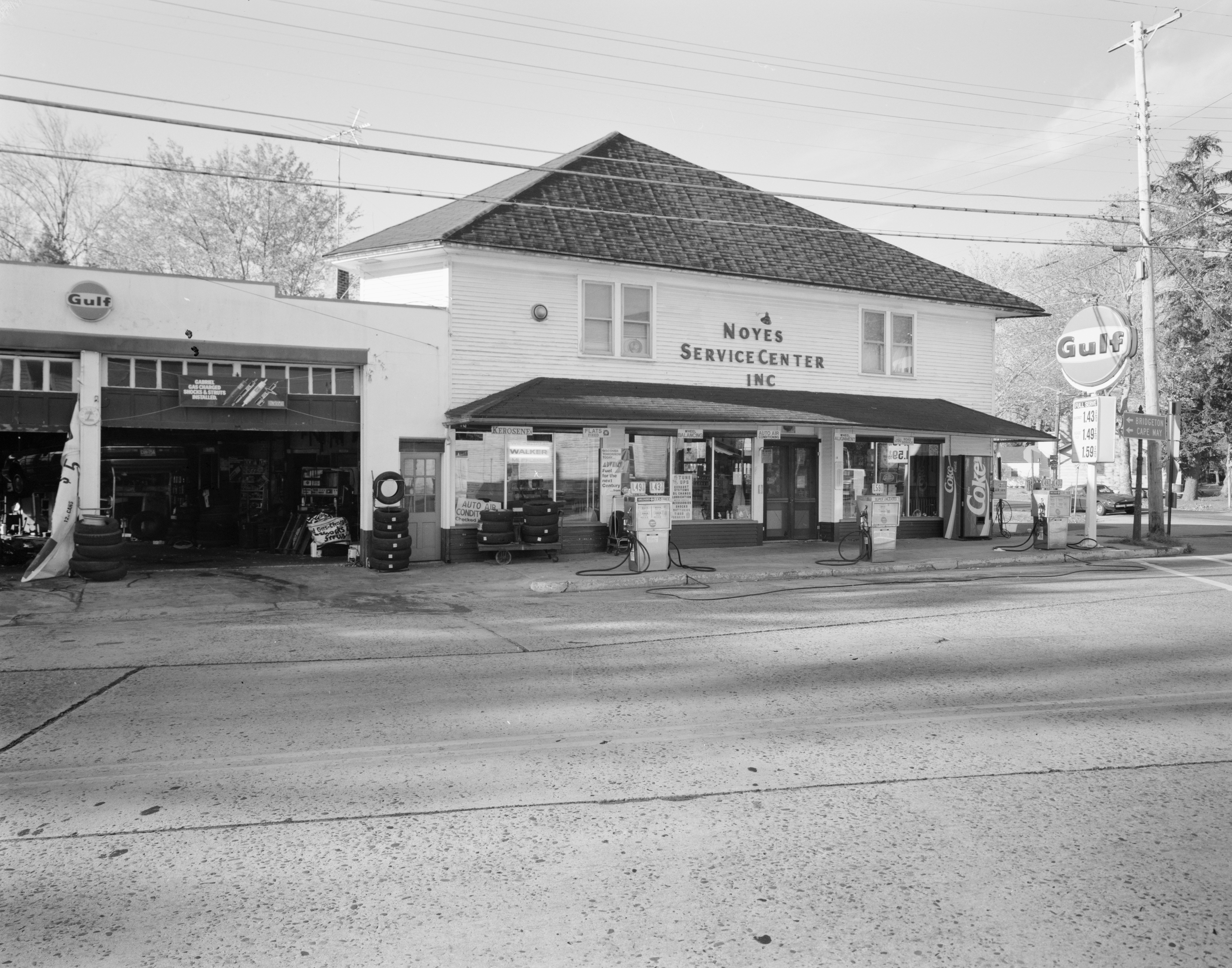
- Noyes Service Center in 1992

- Seal

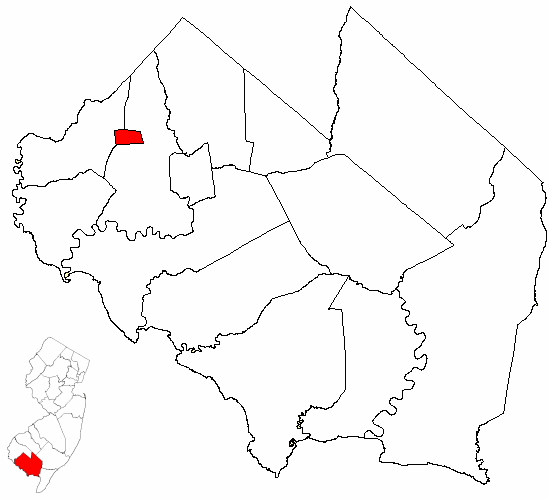
- Location of Shiloh in Cumberland County highlighted in red (right). Inset map: Location of Cumberland County in New Jersey highlighted in red (left).

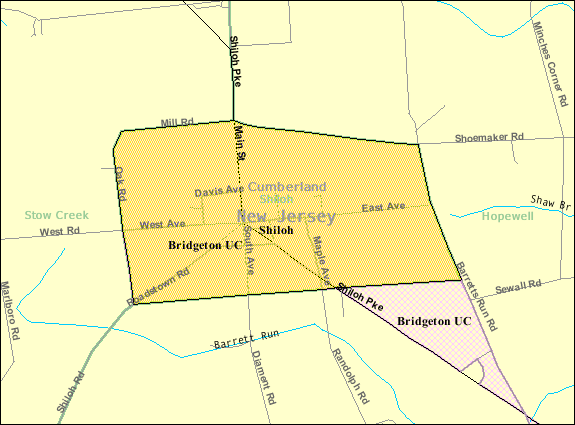
- Census Bureau map of Shiloh, New Jersey

- Location within Cumberland County, New Jersey Location within New Jersey Location within the United States
- Coordinates: 39.462418°N 75.29244°W
- Country: United States
- State: New Jersey
- County: Cumberland
- Incorporated: April 9, 1929

Government
  - Type: Borough
  - Body: Borough Council
  - Mayor: Brad Campbell (R, term ends December 31, 2024)
  - Municipal clerk: Ronald Campbell Sr.

Area
  - Total: 1.20 sq mi (3.12 km^{2})
  - Land: 1.20 sq mi (3.12 km^{2})
  - Water: 0 sq mi (0.00 km^{2}) 0.08%
  - Rank: 486th of 565 in state 14th of 14 in county
- Elevation: 112 ft (34 m)

Population (2020)
  - Total: 444
  - Estimate (2023): 443
  - Rank: 556th of 565 in state 14th of 14 in county
  - Density: 369/sq mi (142/km^{2})
  - Rank: 462nd of 565 in state 4th of 14 in county
- Time zone: UTC−05:00 (Eastern (EST))
  - Summer (DST): UTC−04:00 (Eastern (EDT))
- ZIP Code: 08353
- Area code: 856 exchanges: 451, 455
- FIPS code: 3401167020
- GNIS feature ID: 0885393
- Website: www.shilohborough.com

Shiloh is a borough in Cumberland County, in the U.S. state of New Jersey. It is part of the Vineland–Bridgeton metropolitan statistical area for statistical purposes. As of the 2020 United States census, the borough's population was 444, a decrease of 72 (−14.0%) from the 2010 census count of 516, which in turn reflected a decline of 18 (−3.4%) from the 534 counted in the 2000 census.

Shiloh was incorporated as a borough by an act of the New Jersey Legislature on April 9, 1929, from portions of Hopewell Township and Stow Creek Township, based on the results of a referendum held on May 16, 1929.

It is a dry town, where alcohol is not permitted to be sold by law, though alcohol is available at the winery in the borough.

== History ==
The settlement of Shiloh was founded in 1705 by Robert Ayars, who brought over 2,000 Seventh Day Baptists from Rhode Island to be free of religious persecution. Known as Cohansey Crossing when a church was formed in the area in 1737, the name Shiloh was adopted in 1771, though there is one source that states that the borough was named for the Civil War Battle of Shiloh.

When Cumberland County, New Jersey, was formed in 1748, the community of Shiloh was divided between Hopewell Township and Stow Creek Township.

As part of a political battle over the site of the county seat for Cumberland County, Columbia Township was formed on March 12, 1844, from portions of Hopewell and Stow Creek Townships; the short-lived municipality included all of present-day Shiloh, in addition to extensive additional land, but all was returned to its original home when Columbia Township was dissolved on March 11, 1845, surviving as an independent municipality for a day short of one year.

== Geography ==
According to the United States Census Bureau, the borough had a total area of 1.20 square miles (3.12 km^{2}), including 1.20 square miles (3.12 km^{2}) of land and <0.01 square miles (<0.01 km^{2}) of water (0.08%).

Shiloh borders Hopewell Township and Stow Creek Township.

== Demographics ==
Historical population
Census	Pop.	Note	%±
1930	401		—
1940	387		−3.5%
1950	427		10.3%
1960	554		29.7%
1970	573		3.4%
1980	604		5.4%
1990	408		−32.5%
2000	534		30.9%
2010	516		−3.4%
2020	444		−14.0%
2023 (est.)	443	▼	−0.2%
Population sources:1930–2010 1930 1940–2000; 2000 2010 2020

=== 2010 census ===
The 2010 United States census counted 516 people, 198 households, and 138 families in the borough. The population density was 427.3 per square mile (165.0/km^{2}). There were 214 housing units at an average density of 177.2 per square mile (68.4/km^{2}). The racial makeup was 93.80% (484) White, 1.74% (9) Black or African American, 2.33% (12) Native American, 0.19% (1) Asian, 0.00% (0) Pacific Islander, 0.58% (3) from other races, and 1.36% (7) from two or more races. Hispanic or Latino of any race were 4.07% (21) of the population.

Of the 198 households, 27.8% had children under the age of 18; 51.0% were married couples living together; 14.1% had a female householder with no husband present and 30.3% were non-families. Of all households, 24.7% were made up of individuals and 12.1% had someone living alone who was 65 years of age or older. The average household size was 2.61 and the average family size was 3.10.

21.1% of the population were under the age of 18, 7.0% from 18 to 24, 26.0% from 25 to 44, 30.4% from 45 to 64, and 15.5% who were 65 years of age or older. The median age was 42.0 years. For every 100 females, the population had 85.6 males. For every 100 females ages 18 and older there were 89.3 males.

The Census Bureau's 2006–2010 American Community Survey showed that (in 2010 inflation-adjusted dollars) median household income was $61,000 (with a margin of error of +/− $18,454) and the median family income was $63,594 (+/− $11,716). Males had a median income of $44,375 (+/− $18,670) versus $32,105 (+/− $13,923) for females. The per capita income for the borough was $23,003 (+/− $4,509). About 7.0% of families and 8.7% of the population were below the poverty line, including 18.6% of those under age 18 and 10.7% of those age 65 or over.

=== 2000 census ===
As of the 2000 United States census there were 534 people, 194 households, and 152 families residing in the borough. The population density was 446.7 inhabitants per square mile (172.5/km^{2}). There were 204 housing units at an average density of 170.6 per square mile (65.9/km^{2}). The racial makeup of the borough was 95.13% White, 2.62% African American, 0.56% Native American, 0.00% from other races, and 1.69% from two or more races. Hispanic or Latino of any race were 3.00% of the population.

There were 194 households, out of which 34.5% had children under the age of 18 living with them, 62.9% were married couples living together, 11.9% had a female householder with no husband present, and 21.6% were non-families. 18.0% of all households were made up of individuals, and 7.2% had someone living alone who was 65 years of age or older. The average household size was 2.75 and the average family size was 3.09.

In the borough the population was spread out, with 24.5% under the age of 18, 5.8% from 18 to 24, 27.9% from 25 to 44, 26.0% from 45 to 64, and 15.7% who were 65 years of age or older. The median age was 40 years. For every 100 females, there were 88.7 males. For every 100 females age 18 and over, there were 85.7 males.

The median income for a household in the borough was $49,191, and the median income for a family was $54,219. Males had a median income of $34,643 versus $20,000 for females. The per capita income for the borough was $16,880. 5.8% of the population and 4.1% of families were below the poverty line. Out of the total people living in poverty, 4.5% are under the age of 18 and 0.0% are 65 or older.

== Government ==
=== Local government ===
Shiloh is governed under the borough form of New Jersey municipal government, which is used in 218 municipalities (of the 564) statewide, making it the most common form of government in New Jersey. The governing body is comprised of a mayor and a borough council, with all positions elected at-large on a partisan basis as part of the November general election. A mayor is elected directly by the voters to a four-year term of office. The borough council is comprised of six members elected to serve three-year terms on a staggered basis, with two seats coming up for election each year in a three-year cycle. The borough form of government used by Shiloh is a "weak mayor / strong council" government in which council members act as the legislative body with the mayor presiding at meetings and voting only in the event of a tie. The mayor can veto ordinances subject to an override by a two-thirds majority vote of the council. The mayor makes committee and liaison assignments for council members, and most appointments are made by the mayor with the advice and consent of the council.

As of 2023, the mayor of Shiloh is Republican Brad Campbell, whose term of office ends December 31, 2024. Members of the Borough Council are Council President Dallas Bruso (R, 2024), Hillary Barile (R, 2025), Carman Daddario (R, 2024), Matthew Hunzer (R, 2025), Jeffrey E. Knerr (R, 2023) and Medeia D. Willis (R, 2023).

Brad Campbell was appointed to fill the vacant mayoral seat of Harold Davis, following his death in February 2014. The council seat expiring in 2017 held by Carman Daddario became vacant following his being sworn in to serve on the Cumberland County Board of Chosen Freeholders.

=== Federal, state and county representation ===
Shiloh is located in the 2nd Congressional District and is part of New Jersey's 3rd state legislative district.

For the 119th United States Congress, New Jersey's 2nd congressional district is represented by Jeff Van Drew (R, Dennis Township). New Jersey is represented in the United States Senate by Democrats Cory Booker (Newark, term ends 2027) and Andy Kim (Moorestown, term ends 2031).

For the 2026–2027 session, the 3rd legislative district of the New Jersey Legislature is represented in the State Senate by John Burzichelli (D, Paulsboro) and in the General Assembly by David Bailey (D, Woodstown) and Heather Simmons (D, Glassboro).

Cumberland County is governed by a Board of County Commissioners composed of seven members who are elected at large by the citizens of Cumberland County in partisan elections and serve staggered three-year terms in office, with either two or three seats coming up for election each year in a three-year cycle. Annually, the seven board members select a Director and Deputy Director for one-year terms. As of 2025, members of the Cumberland County Board of County Commissioners (with party affiliation, residence and term-end year listed in parentheses) are:

Douglas A. Albrecht (R, Vineland, 2025), Deputy Director Antonio Romero (R, Vineland, 2027), Sandra Taylor (R, Downe Township; 2026), Victoria Groetsch-Lods (R, Vineland, 2025), Arthur Marchand (R, Hopewell Township, 2026), James Sauro (R, Vineland, 2026) and Robert A. Austino (D, Bridgeton, 2027).

The county's constitutional officers are: Clerk Celeste Riley (D, Bridgeton, 2029), Sheriff Michael Donato (R, Bridgeton, 2026) and Surrogate Rudolph Luisi (R, Vineland, 2028).

=== Politics ===
As of March 2011, there were a total of 374 registered voters in Shiloh, of which 80 (21.4%) were registered as Democrats, 117 (31.3%) were registered as Republicans and 176 (47.1%) were registered as Unaffiliated. There was one voter registered to another party.

Gubernatorial election results for Shiloh
Year	Republican		Democratic		Third party(ies)	
Year	No.	%	No.	%	No.	%
2025	135	62.79%	76	35.35%	4	1.86%
2021	136	71.96%	53	28.04%	0	0.00%
2017	86	55.84%	62	40.26%	6	3.90%
2013	130	77.84%	32	19.16%	5	2.99%
2009	109	57.67%	63	33.33%	17	8.99%
2005	94	50.27%	76	40.64%	17	9.09%

In the 2012 presidential election, Republican Mitt Romney received 64.1% of the vote (159 cast), ahead of Democrat Barack Obama with 35.5% (88 votes), and other candidates with 0.4% (1 vote), among the 248 ballots cast by the borough's 365 registered voters for a turnout of 67.9%. In the 2008 presidential election, Republican John McCain received 57.1% of the vote (160 cast), ahead of Democrat Barack Obama, who received 40.4% (113 votes), with 280 ballots cast among the borough's 371 registered voters, for a turnout of 75.5%. In the 2004 presidential election, Republican George W. Bush received 66.8% of the vote (183 ballots cast), outpolling Democrat John Kerry, who received around 33.6% (92 votes), with 275 ballots cast among the borough's 352 registered voters, for a turnout percentage of 77.8.

United States presidential election results for Shiloh 2024 2020 2016 2012 2008 2004
Year	Republican		Democratic		Third party(ies)	
Year	No.	%	No.	%	No.	%
2024	180	67.42%	83	31.09%	4	1.50%
2020	177	65.07%	91	33.46%	4	1.47%
2016	177	69.69%	68	26.77%	9	3.54%
2012	159	64.11%	88	35.48%	1	0.40%
2008	160	56.54%	113	39.93%	10	3.53%
2004	183	66.55%	92	33.45%	0	0.00%

In the 2013 gubernatorial election, Republican Chris Christie received 77.8% of the vote (130 cast), ahead of Democrat Barbara Buono with 19.2% (32 votes), and other candidates with 3.0% (5 votes), among the 170 ballots cast by the borough's 342 registered voters (3 ballots were spoiled), for a turnout of 49.7%. In the 2009 gubernatorial election, Republican Chris Christie received 56.5% of the vote (109 ballots cast), ahead of both Democrat Jon Corzine with 32.6% (63 votes) and Independent Chris Daggett with 6.7% (13 votes), with 193 ballots cast among the borough's 378 registered voters, yielding a 51.1% turnout.

United States Senate election results for Shiloh1
Year	Republican		Democratic		Third party(ies)	
Year	No.	%	No.	%	No.	%
2024	160	61.30%	83	31.80%	18	6.90%
2018	136	69.74%	52	26.67%	7	3.59%
2012	136	61.26%	80	36.04%	6	2.70%
2006	114	66.28%	53	30.81%	5	2.91%

United States Senate election results for Shiloh2
Year	Republican		Democratic		Third party(ies)	
Year	No.	%	No.	%	No.	%
2020	167	63.98%	91	34.87%	3	1.15%
2014	118	69.01%	50	29.24%	3	1.75%
2013	79	75.24%	24	22.86%	2	1.90%
2008	152	60.08%	94	37.15%	7	2.77%

== Education ==
After Shiloh School was closed following the end of the 2006–07 school year, all public school students in kindergarten through eighth grade now attend Hopewell Crest School as part of a sending/receiving relationship with the Hopewell Township School District. As of the 2018–19 school year, the district, comprised of one school, had an enrollment of 507 students and 36.0 classroom teachers (on an FTE basis), for a student–teacher ratio of 14.1:1.

Public school students in ninth through twelfth grades attend Cumberland Regional High School, which also serves students from Deerfield Township, Fairfield Township, Greenwich Township, Hopewell Township, Stow Creek Township and Upper Deerfield Township. As of the 2022–23 school year, the high school had an enrollment of 1,124 students and 82.0 classroom teachers (on an FTE basis), for a student–teacher ratio of 13.7:1. The high school district has a nine-member board of education, with board seats allocated to the constituent municipalities based on population, with each municipality assigned a minimum of one seat; Shiloh has one seat on the board.

Students are also eligible to attend Cumberland County Technical Education Center in Vineland, serving students from the entire county in its full-time technical training programs, which are offered without charge to students who are county residents.

== Transportation ==
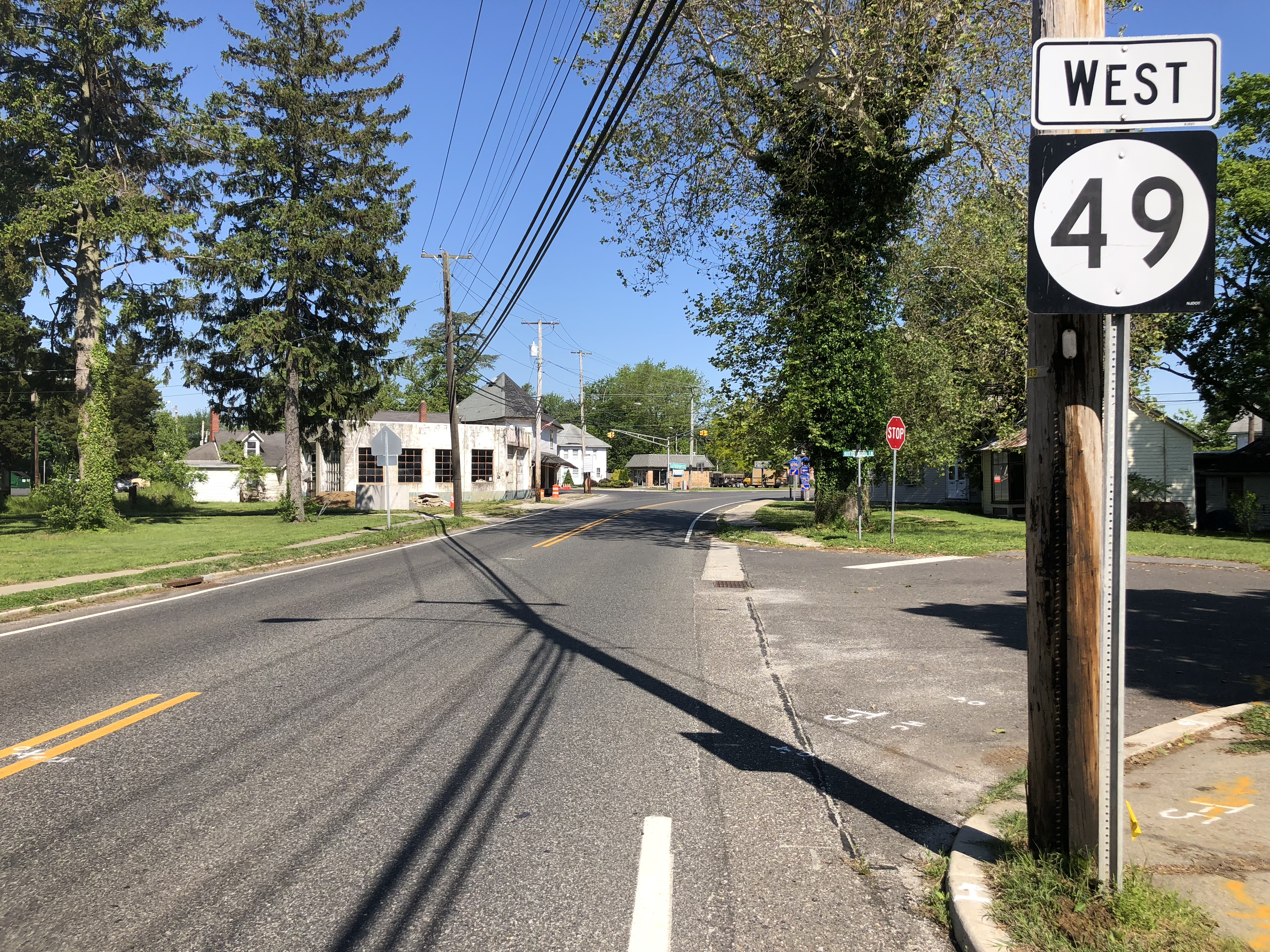
Route 49 westbound in Shiloh

As of May 2010, the borough had a total of 5.84 miles (9.40 km) of roadways, of which 1.54 miles (2.48 km) were maintained by the municipality, 3.17 miles (5.10 km) by Cumberland County and 1.13 miles (1.82 km) by the New Jersey Department of Transportation.

Route 49 (Shiloh Pike) traverses the borough from north to south for about 1 mile (1.6 km), connecting Hopewell Township on one side and Stow Creek Township on the other.

== Winery ==
- Swansea Vineyards
