= Stow Creek (New Jersey) =

River in New Jersey, United States

Coordinates: 39.448732°N 75.352878°W

Stow Creek is an 18.0-mile-long (29.0 km) tributary of Delaware Bay in Salem and Cumberland counties, New Jersey in the United States.

The creek forms part of the border between Salem and Cumberland Counties.

It empties into Delaware Bay at the ghost town of Bayside; the actual mouth has moved northward as erosion has cut open a loop of the creek.

== See also ==
- List of rivers of New Jersey
