= Stow Creek School District =

School district in Cumberland County, New Jersey, US

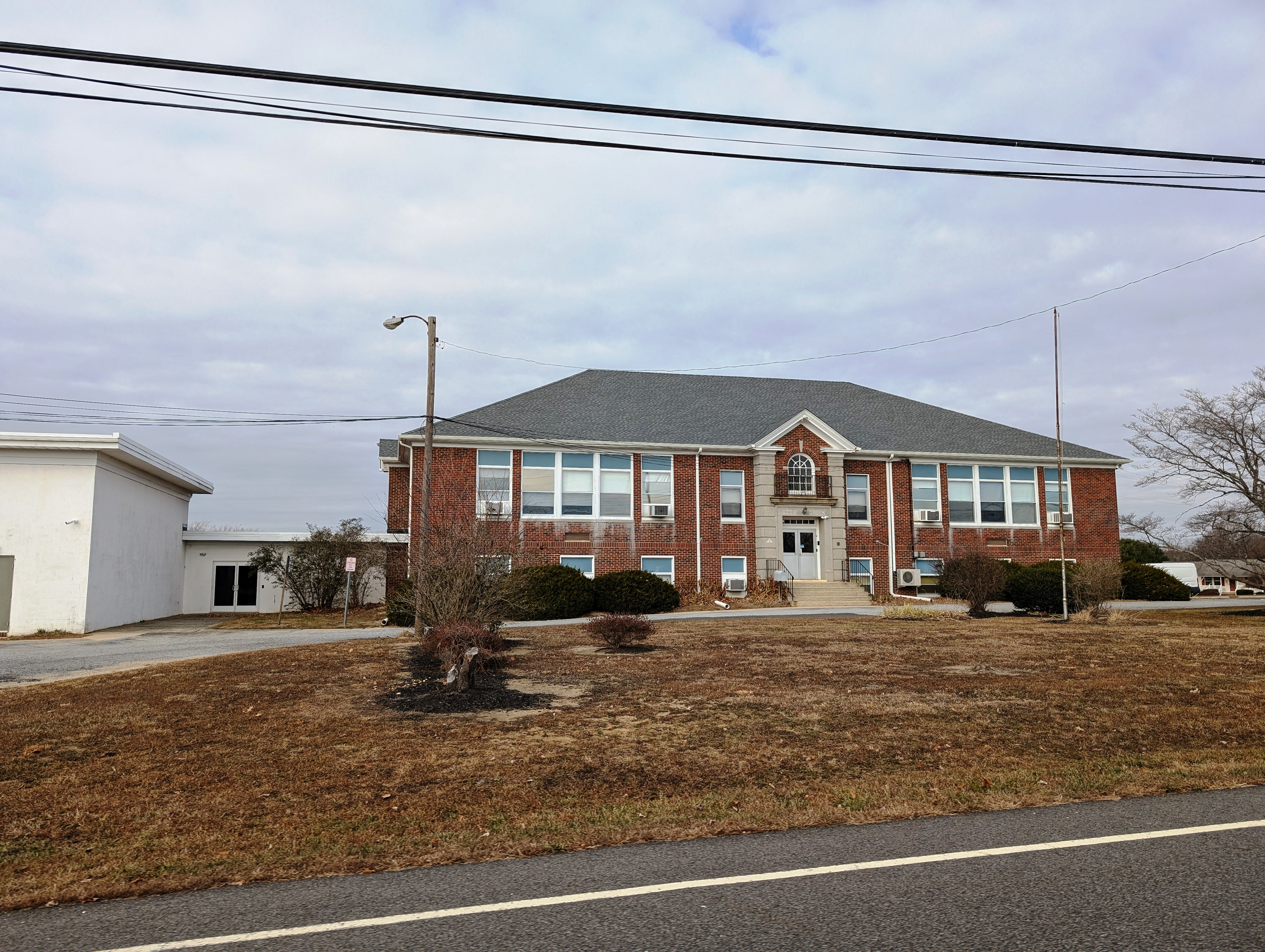
- Stow Creek School, the only school in the district

Address
- 11 Gum Tree Corner Road Stow Creek Township, Cumberland County, New Jersey, 08302; United States
- Coordinates: 39.453226°N 75.343621°W

District information
- Grades: PreK-8
- Superintendent: Brandon Cobb
- Business administrator: Kim Fleetwood
- Schools: 1

Students and staff
- Enrollment: 123 (as of 2022–23)
- Faculty: 12.6 FTEs
- Student–teacher ratio: 9.7:1

Other information
- District Factor Group: CD
- Website: gscnj.org
Ind.	Per pupil	District spending	Rank (*)	K-8 average	%± vs. average
1A	Total Spending	$16,720	15	$18,891	−11.5%
1	Budgetary Cost	13,721	17	14,159	−3.1%
2	Classroom Instruction	8,406	23	8,659	−2.9%
6	Support Services	1,368	6	2,167	−36.9%
8	Administrative Cost	1,841	56	1,547	19.0%
10	Operations & Maintenance	1,905	46	1,612	18.2%
13	Extracurricular Activities	70	21	104	−32.7%
16	Median Teacher Salary	53,635	16	61,136
Data from NJDoE 2014 Taxpayers' Guide to Education Spending. *Of K-8 districts with up to 400 students. Lowest spending=1; Highest=71

The Stow Creek School District is a community public school district that serves students in kindergarten through eighth grade from Stow Creek Township, in Cumberland County, in the U.S. state of New Jersey.

Under the Greenwich - Stow Creek Partnership established in 2009 with the Greenwich Township School District in Greenwich Township, students from both townships attend Morris Goodwin School for grades K-4 and Stow Creek School for grades 5-8.

As of the 2022–23 school year, the district, comprised of one school, had an enrollment of 123 students and 12.6 classroom teachers (on an FTE basis), for a student–teacher ratio of 9.7:1. In the 2016-17 school year, it had the 13th-smallest enrollment of any school district in the state.

The district is classified by the New Jersey Department of Education as being in District Factor Group "CD", the third-lowest of eight groupings. District Factor Groups organize districts statewide to allow comparison by common socioeconomic characteristics of the local districts. From lowest socioeconomic status to highest, the categories are A, B, CD, DE, FG, GH, I and J.

Public school students in ninth through twelfth grades attend Cumberland Regional High School, which also serves students from Deerfield Township, Fairfield Township, Greenwich Township, Hopewell Township, Shiloh Borough, Stow Creek Township and Upper Deerfield Township. As of the 2020–21 school year, the high school had an enrollment of 1,032 students and 78.5 classroom teachers (on an FTE basis), for a student–teacher ratio of 13.1:1.

== School ==
Stow Creek School had an enrollment of 124 students in grades PreK-8 in the 2020–21 school year.

== Administration ==
Core members of the district's administration are:

- Brandon Cobb, superintendent
- Kim Fleetwood, business administrator and board secretary

== Board of education ==
The district's board of education is comprised of seven members who set policy and oversee the fiscal and educational operation of the district through its administration. As a Type II school district, the board's trustees are elected directly by voters to serve three-year terms of office on a staggered basis, with either two or three seats up for election each year held (since 2012) as part of the November general election. The board appoints a superintendent to oversee the district's day-to-day operations and a business administrator to supervise the business functions of the district.
