= Greenwich Township, Cumberland County, New Jersey =

Township in Cumberland County, New Jersey, US

Greenwich Township, New Jersey
- Township
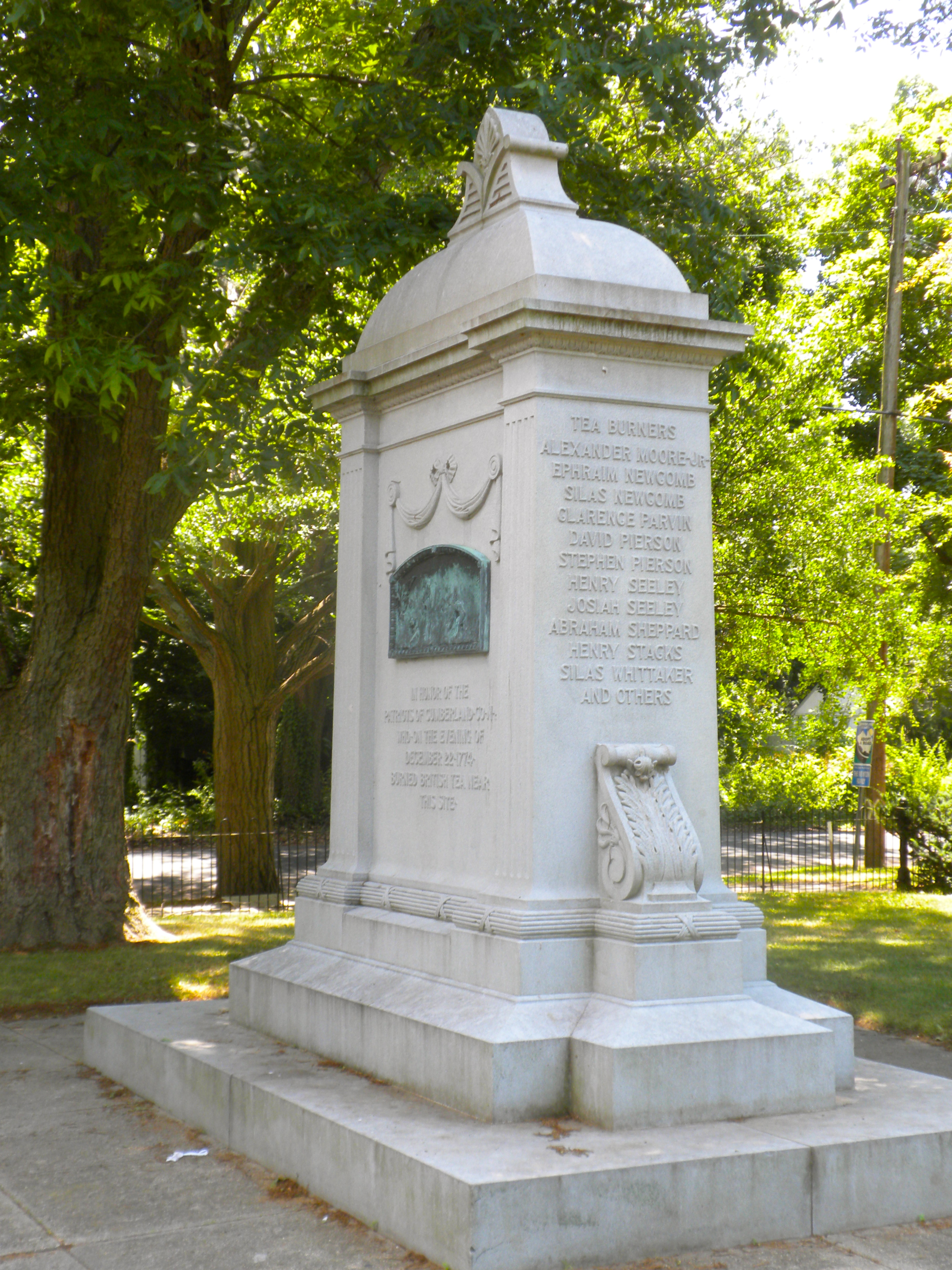
- Teaburners' Monument

- logo

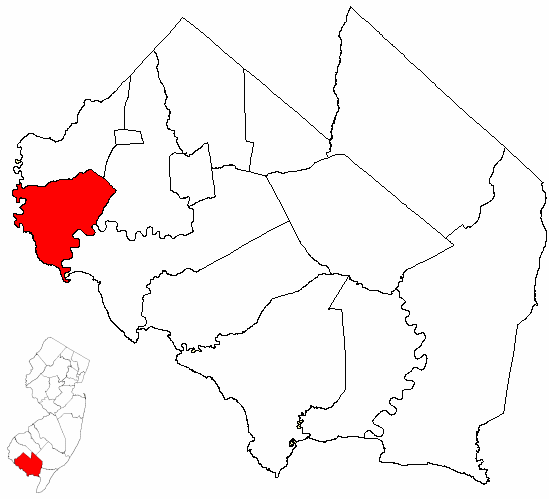
- Location of Greenwich Township in Cumberland County highlighted in red (right). Inset map: Location of Cumberland County in New Jersey highlighted in red (left).

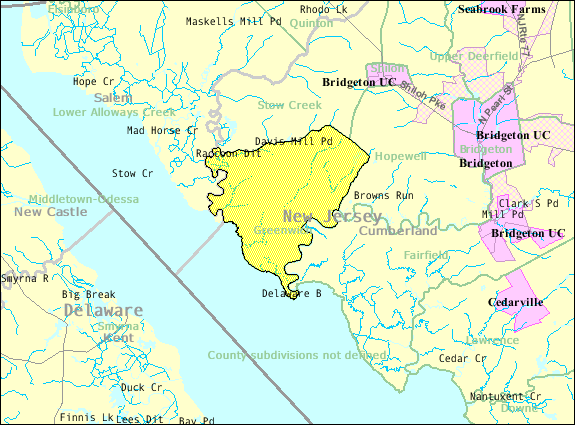
- Census Bureau map of Greenwich Township, Cumberland County, New Jersey

- Location in Cumberland County Location in New Jersey Location in the United States
- Coordinates: 39.396273°N 75.367551°W
- Country: United States
- State: New Jersey
- County: Cumberland
- Established: January 19, 1748
- Incorporated: February 21, 1798
- Named for: Greenwich, England

Government
  - Type: Township
  - Body: Township Committee
  - Mayor: William C. Reinhart (D, term ends December 31, 2023)
  - Municipal clerk: Lisa Garrison

Area
  - Total: 18.75 sq mi (48.55 km^{2})
  - Land: 17.77 sq mi (46.03 km^{2})
  - Water: 0.97 sq mi (2.52 km^{2}) 5.19%
  - Rank: 152nd of 565 in state 11th of 14 in county
- Elevation: 20 ft (6.1 m)

Population (2020)
  - Total: 771
  - Estimate (2023): 763
  - Rank: 544th of 565 in state 13th of 14 in county
  - Density: 43.4/sq mi (16.8/km^{2})
  - Rank: 555th of 565 in state 13th of 14 in county
- Time zone: UTC−05:00 (Eastern (EST))
  - Summer (DST): UTC−04:00 (Eastern (EDT))
- ZIP Code: 08323
- Area code: 856 exchanges: 451, 453, 455
- FIPS code: 3401128170
- GNIS feature ID: 0882058
- Website: www.historicgreenwichnj.org

1862 map of Cumberland County

Greenwich Township (/ˈɡriːnwɪtʃ/) is the westernmost township in Cumberland County, in the U.S. state of New Jersey. As of the 2020 United States census, the township's population was 771, a decrease of 33 (−4.1%) from the 2010 census count of 804, which in turn reflected a decline of 43 (−5.1%) from the 847 counted in the 2000 census. It is part of the Vineland-Bridgeton metropolitan statistical area, which encompasses those cities and all of Cumberland County for statistical purposes and which constitutes a part of the Philadelphia metropolitan area.

== History ==
Greenwich Township was first formed as a precinct on January 19, 1748, and was incorporated by an act of the New Jersey Legislature on February 21, 1798, as one of New Jersey's initial group of 104 townships. Portions of Hopewell Township and Stow Creek Township were annexed in 1845. The township was named for Greenwich, England.

In 1774, during the run-up to the American Revolutionary War, the small community on the Cohansey River was the site of the Greenwich Tea Party, in which a load of tea meant to be sent overland into Philadelphia, Pennsylvania, was torched in the night. After the Revolutionary War, the pronunciation of the town was changed to Green-witch to differentiate itself from its English namesake.

== Geography ==
According to the United States Census Bureau, the township had a total area of 18.75 square miles (48.55 km^{2}), including 17.77 square miles (46.03 km^{2}) of land and 0.97 square miles (2.52 km^{2}) of water (5.19%).

The township borders the municipalities of Fairfield Township, Hopewell Township and Stow Creek Township in Cumberland County; and Lower Alloways Creek Township in Salem County and the Delaware Bay.

Unincorporated communities, localities and place names located partially or completely within the township include Bacons Neck, Bayside, Caviar, Davis Mills, Greenwich, Othello, Sheppards Mill, Springtown and Stathams Neck.

== Demographics ==
Historical population
Census	Pop.	Note	%±
1810	858		—
1820	890		3.7%
1830	912		2.5%
1840	918		0.7%
1850	1,158		26.1%
1860	1,265		9.2%
1870	1,262		−0.2%
1880	1,245		−1.3%
1890	1,173		−5.8%
1900	1,283		9.4%
1910	1,145		−10.8%
1920	966		−15.6%
1930	979		1.3%
1940	929		−5.1%
1950	966		4.0%
1960	1,086		12.4%
1970	963		−11.3%
1980	973		1.0%
1990	911		−6.4%
2000	847		−7.0%
2010	804		−5.1%
2020	771		−4.1%
2023 (est.)	763		−1.0%
Population sources: 1810–2010; 1810–1920 1840 1850–1870; 1850 1870 1880–1890; 1890–1910 1910–1930; 1940–2000 2000; 2010 2020

=== 2010 census ===
The 2010 United States census counted 804 people, 336 households, and 229 families in the township. The population density was 45.1 per square mile (17.4/km^{2}). There were 369 housing units at an average density of 20.7 per square mile (8.0/km^{2}). The racial makeup was 91.42% (735) White, 3.73% (30) Black or African American, 1.24% (10) Native American, 0.50% (4) Asian, 0.00% (0) Pacific Islander, 0.62% (5) from other races, and 2.49% (20) from two or more races. Hispanic or Latino of any race were 2.61% (21) of the population.

Of the 336 households, 21.7% had children under the age of 18; 57.1% were married couples living together; 6.8% had a female householder with no husband present and 31.8% were non-families. Of all households, 26.5% were made up of individuals and 10.7% had someone living alone who was 65 years of age or older. The average household size was 2.39 and the average family size was 2.89.

19.8% of the population were under the age of 18, 5.3% from 18 to 24, 21.3% from 25 to 44, 35.6% from 45 to 64, and 18.0% who were 65 years of age or older. The median age was 47.7 years. For every 100 females, the population had 101.0 males. For every 100 females ages 18 and older there were 104.1 males.

The Census Bureau's 2006–2010 American Community Survey showed that (in 2010 inflation-adjusted dollars) median household income was $55,833 (with a margin of error of +/− $17,252) and the median family income was $80,000 (+/− $16,466). Males had a median income of $55,938 (+/− $11,759) versus $55,833 (+/− $25,039) for females. The per capita income for the borough was $31,044 (+/− $4,936). About 5.3% of families and 9.7% of the population were below the poverty line, including 12.5% of those under age 18 and 6.5% of those age 65 or over.

=== 2000 census ===
As of the 2000 United States census there were 847 people, 326 households, and 245 families residing in the township. The population density was 46.6 inhabitants per square mile (18.0/km^{2}). There were 361 housing units at an average density of 19.9 per square mile (7.7/km^{2}). The racial makeup of the township was 89.96% White, 5.08% African American, 2.60% Native American, 0.24% Asian, 0.12% from other races, and 2.01% from two or more races. Hispanic or Latino of any race were 1.53% of the population.

There were 326 households, out of which 27.3% had children under the age of 18 living with them, 62.0% were married couples living together, 8.0% had a female householder with no husband present, and 24.8% were non-families. 21.8% of all households were made up of individuals, and 10.1% had someone living alone who was 65 years of age or older. The average household size was 2.60 and the average family size was 3.05.

In the township the population was spread out, with 22.0% under the age of 18, 7.0% from 18 to 24, 23.0% from 25 to 44, 33.2% from 45 to 64, and 14.9% who were 65 years of age or older. The median age was 43 years. For every 100 females, there were 98.4 males. For every 100 females age 18 and over, there were 99.1 males.

The median income for a household in the township was $52,188, and the median income for a family was $56,111. Males had a median income of $43,214 versus $30,208 for females. The per capita income for the township was $22,233. About 6.1% of families and 8.0% of the population were below the poverty line, including 8.7% of those under age 18 and 17.1% of those age 65 or over.

== Government ==
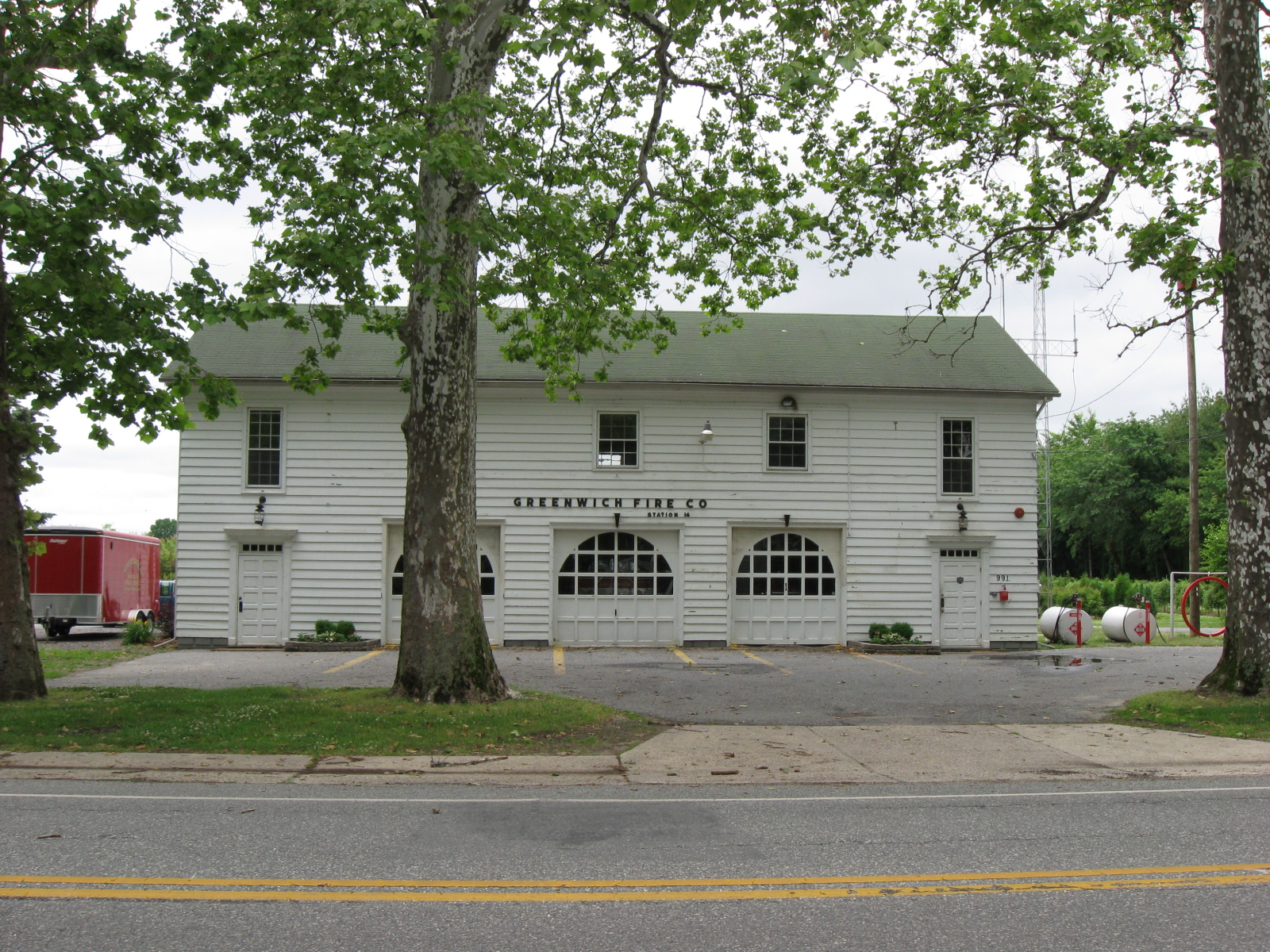
Greenwich Fire Company

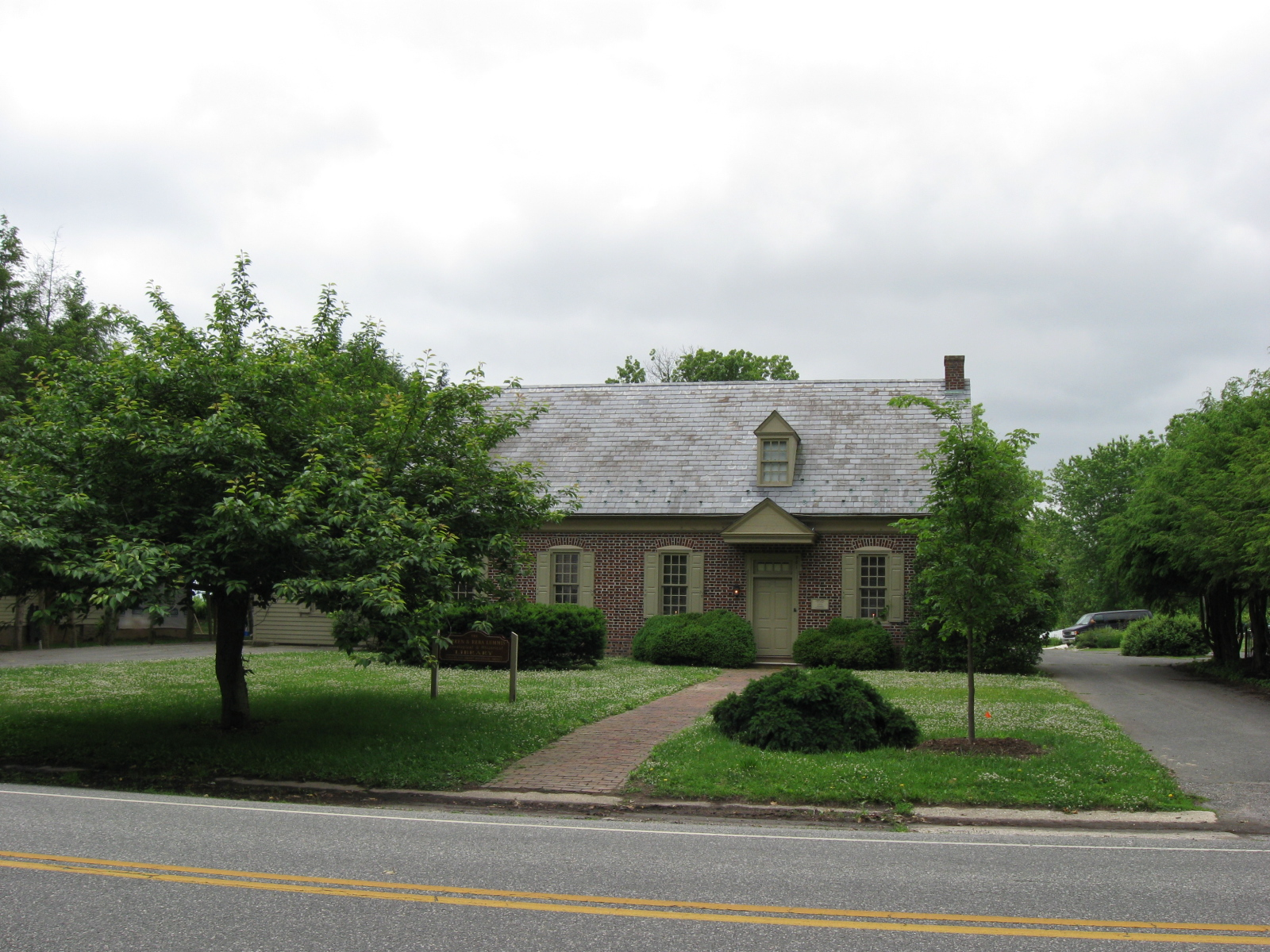
Greenwich Library

=== Local government ===
Greenwich Township is governed under the Township form of New Jersey municipal government, one of 141 municipalities (of the 564) statewide that use this form, the second-most commonly used form of government in the state. The governing body is comprised of a three-member Township Committee, whose members are elected directly by the voters at-large in partisan elections to serve three-year terms of office on a staggered basis, with one seat coming up for election each year as part of the November general election in a three-year cycle. At an annual reorganization meeting, the Township Committee selects one of its members to serve as Mayor and another to serve as Deputy Mayor.

As of 2025, members of the Greenwich Township Committee are Mayor William C. "Bill" Reinhart (D, term on committee ends December 31, 2026; term as mayor ends 2025), Deputy Mayor Daniel J. Orr (D, term on committee and as deputy mayor ends 2025) and Mark Werley (D, 2027).

In January 2013, Dan Orr was selected by the Township Council from among three candidates offered by the Democratic municipal committee to serve the unexpired term of Bill Kiefer, who resigned from office earlier that month.

In 2018, the township had an average property tax bill of $6,372, the highest in the county, compared to an average bill of $8,767 statewide.

=== Federal, state, and county representation ===
Greenwich Township is located in the 2nd Congressional District and is part of New Jersey's 3rd state legislative district.

For the 119th United States Congress, New Jersey's 2nd congressional district is represented by Jeff Van Drew (R, Dennis Township). New Jersey is represented in the United States Senate by Democrats Cory Booker (Newark, term ends 2027) and Andy Kim (Moorestown, term ends 2031).

For the 2026–2027 session, the 3rd legislative district of the New Jersey Legislature is represented in the State Senate by John Burzichelli (D, Paulsboro) and in the General Assembly by David Bailey (D, Woodstown) and Heather Simmons (D, Glassboro).

Cumberland County is governed by a Board of County Commissioners composed of seven members who are elected at large by the citizens of Cumberland County in partisan elections and serve staggered three-year terms in office, with either two or three seats coming up for election each year in a three-year cycle. Annually, the seven board members select a Director and Deputy Director for one-year terms. As of 2025, members of the Cumberland County Board of County Commissioners (with party affiliation, residence and term-end year listed in parentheses) are:

Douglas A. Albrecht (R, Vineland, 2025), Deputy Director Antonio Romero (R, Vineland, 2027), Sandra Taylor (R, Downe Township; 2026), Victoria Groetsch-Lods (R, Vineland, 2025), Arthur Marchand (R, Hopewell Township, 2026), James Sauro (R, Vineland, 2026) and Robert A. Austino (D, Bridgeton, 2027).

The county's constitutional officers are: Clerk Celeste Riley (D, Bridgeton, 2029), Sheriff Michael Donato (R, Bridgeton, 2026) and Surrogate Rudolph Luisi (R, Vineland, 2028).

=== Politics ===
As of March 2011, there were a total of 590 registered voters in Greenwich Township, of which 172 (29.2%) were registered as Democrats, 176 (29.8%) were registered as Republicans and 242 (41.0%) were registered as Unaffiliated. There were no voters registered to other parties.

Gubernatorial election results for Greenwich Township
Year	Republican		Democratic		Third party(ies)	
Year	No.	%	No.	%	No.	%
2025	186	50.54%	180	48.91%	2	0.54%
2021	194	58.97%	131	39.82%	4	1.22%
2017	128	47.23%	139	51.29%	4	1.48%
2013	237	64.93%	124	33.97%	4	1.10%
2009	153	45.40%	149	44.21%	35	10.39%
2005	142	45.81%	149	48.06%	19	6.13%

In the 2012 presidential election, Democrat Barack Obama received 51.5% of the vote (229 cast), ahead of Republican Mitt Romney with 45.6% (203 votes), and other candidates with 2.9% (13 votes), among the 449 ballots cast by the township's 620 registered voters (4 ballots were spoiled), for a turnout of 72.4%. In the 2008 presidential election, Democrat Barack Obama received 50.4% of the vote (227 cast), ahead of Republican John McCain, who received 48.0% (216 votes), with 450 ballots cast among the township's 605 registered voters, for a turnout of 74.4%. In the 2004 presidential election, Republican George W. Bush received 50.3% of the vote (233 ballots cast), outpolling Democrat John Kerry, who received around 48.4% (224 votes), with 463 ballots cast among the township's 600 registered voters, for a turnout percentage of 77.2.

United States presidential election results for Greenwich Township 2024 2020 2016 2012 2008 2004
Year	Republican		Democratic		Third party(ies)	
Year	No.	%	No.	%	No.	%
2024	264	55.70%	206	43.46%	4	0.84%
2020	261	52.41%	226	45.38%	11	2.21%
2016	230	53.24%	183	42.36%	19	4.40%
2012	213	46.81%	229	50.33%	13	2.86%
2008	216	48.00%	227	50.44%	7	1.56%
2004	233	50.32%	224	48.38%	6	1.30%

In the 2013 gubernatorial election, Republican Chris Christie received 64.9% of the vote (237 cast), ahead of Democrat Barbara Buono with 34.0% (124 votes), and other candidates with 1.1% (4 votes), among the 372 ballots cast by the township's 589 registered voters (7 ballots were spoiled), for a turnout of 63.2%. In the 2009 gubernatorial election, Republican Chris Christie received 44.7% of the vote (153 ballots cast), ahead of both Democrat Jon Corzine with 43.6% (149 votes) and Independent Chris Daggett with 7.0% (24 votes), with 342 ballots cast among the township's 583 registered voters, yielding a 58.7% turnout.

United States Senate election results for Greenwich Township1
Year	Republican		Democratic		Third party(ies)	
Year	No.	%	No.	%	No.	%
2024	242	52.61%	205	44.57%	13	2.83%
2018	174	51.94%	146	43.58%	15	4.48%
2012	178	43.31%	225	54.74%	8	1.95%
2006	158	49.84%	155	48.90%	4	1.26%

United States Senate election results for Greenwich Township2
Year	Republican		Democratic		Third party(ies)	
Year	No.	%	No.	%	No.	%
2020	246	50.20%	230	46.94%	14	2.86%
2014	149	50.85%	142	48.46%	2	0.68%
2013	103	54.50%	83	43.92%	3	1.59%
2008	186	45.59%	215	52.70%	7	1.72%

== Education ==
The Greenwich Township School District serves public school students in kindergarten through eighth grade at Morris Goodwin School. As of the 2018–19 school year, the district, comprised of one school, had an enrollment of 61 students and 14.6 classroom teachers (on an FTE basis), for a student–teacher ratio of 4.2:1. In the 2016–17 school year, it had 62 students, the second-smallest enrollment of any school district in the state. Under the terms of the Greenwich – Stow Creek Partnership established in 2009 with the Stow Creek School District in Stow Creek Township, New Jersey, students from both townships attend Morris Goodwin School for grades K–4 and Stow Creek School for grades 5–8.

Public school students in ninth through twelfth grades attend Cumberland Regional High School, which also serves students from Deerfield Township, Fairfield Township, Hopewell Township, Shiloh Borough, Stow Creek Township and Upper Deerfield Township. As of the 2022–23 school year, the high school had an enrollment of 1,124 students and 82.0 classroom teachers (on an FTE basis), for a student–teacher ratio of 13.7:1. The high school district has a nine-member board of education, with board seats allocated to the constituent municipalities based on population, with each municipality assigned a minimum of one seat; Greenwich Township has one seat on the board.

Students are also eligible to attend Cumberland County Technical Education Center in Vineland, serving students from the entire county in its full-time technical training programs, which are offered without charge to students who are county residents.

== Transportation ==
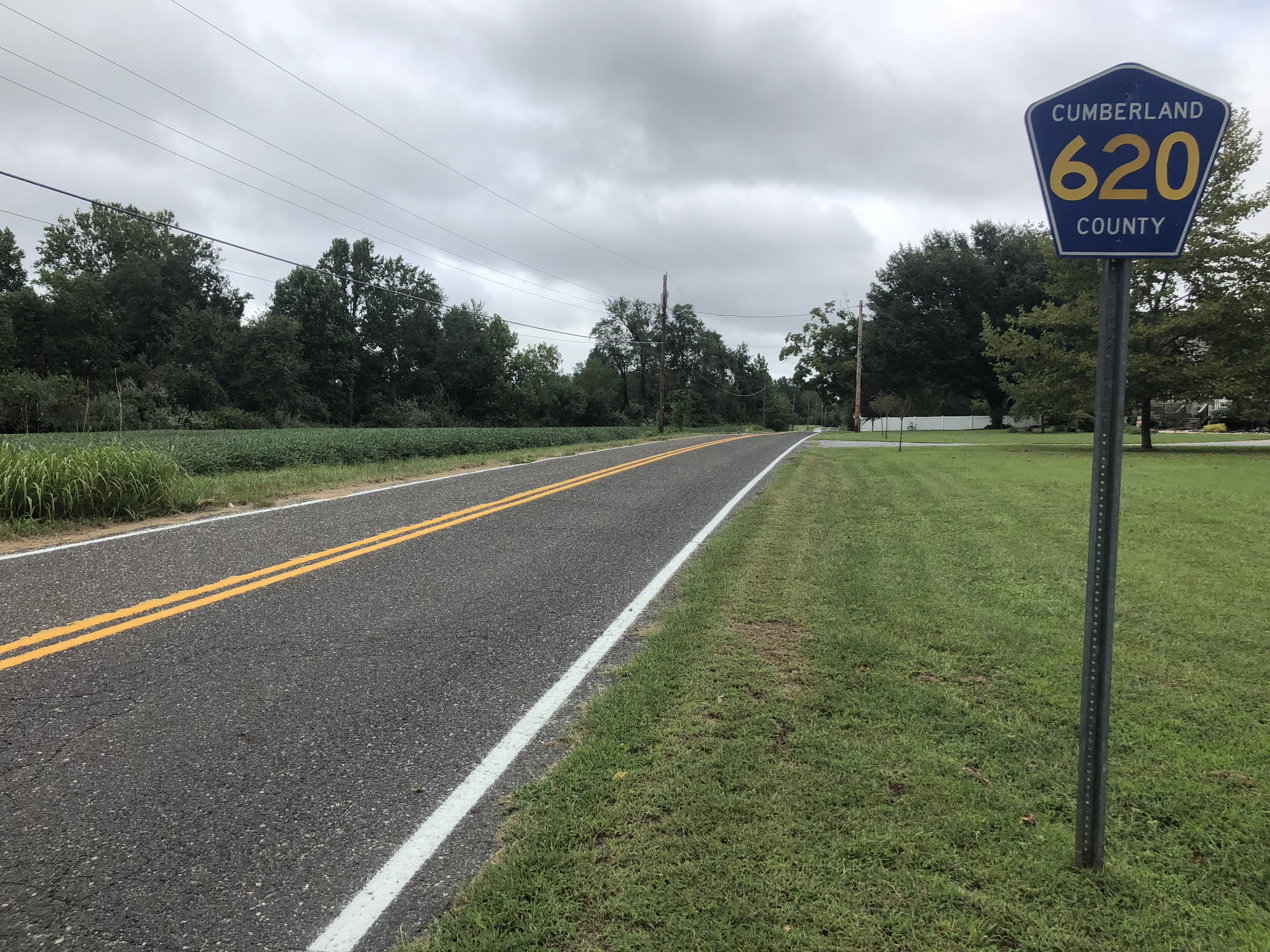
County Route 620 in Greenwich Township

As of May 2010, the township had a total of 33.15 miles (53.35 km) of roadways, of which 8.37 miles (13.47 km) were maintained by the municipality and 24.78 miles (39.88 km) by Cumberland County.

No Interstate, U.S., state or significant county highways serve Greenwich Township. The only numbered routes are minor county roads such as County Route 620.

== Notable people ==
People who were born in, residents of, or otherwise closely associated with Greenwich Township include:

- Philip Vickers Fithian (1747–1776), peripatetic tutor, best known for his journals and letters of 1773 to 1774 when he tutored at a Virginia plantation
- Robert Patterson (1743–1824), educator and director of the United States Mint
- Roland Renne (1905–1989), professor of agricultural economics who served as President of Montana State College from 1943 to 1964
- George Bacon Wood (1797–1879), physician, professor and writer.
