= Federal Correctional Institution, Fairton =

Federal prison in New Jersey, United States

Coordinates: 39.38921°N 75.16043°W

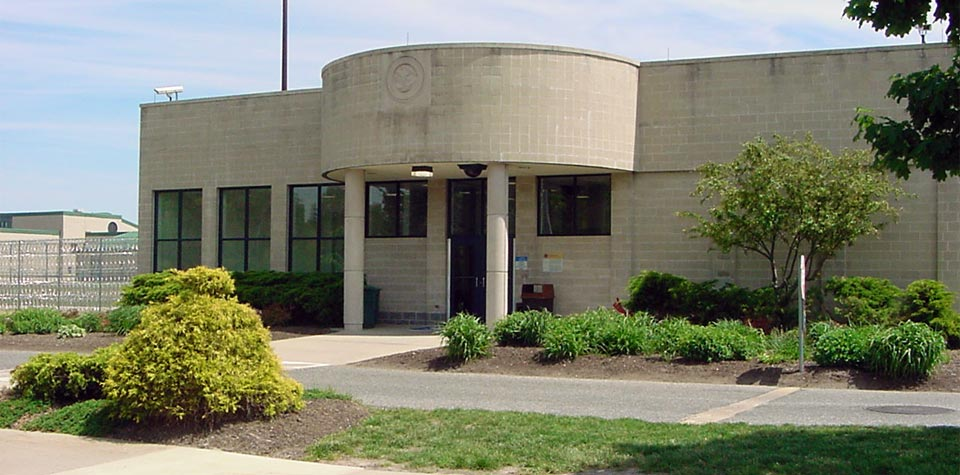
- Interactive map of Federal Correctional Institution, Fairton
- Location: Fairfield Township, Cumberland County, near Fairton, New Jersey
- Status: Operational
- Security class: Medium security (with minimum-security prison camp)
- Population: 1,460 (120 in prison camp)
- Managed by: Federal Bureau of Prisons
- Warden: Steven Merendino

The Federal Correctional Institution, Fairton (FCI Fairton) is a medium-security United States federal prison for male inmates in Fairfield Township, Cumberland County, New Jersey. It is operated by the Federal Bureau of Prisons, a division of the United States Department of Justice. The facility also has an adjacent satellite prison camp housing minimum-security male offenders and a completely separate medium-security unit that houses inmates admitted into the federal Witness Security Program.

FCI Fairton is located 50 miles (80 km) southeast of Philadelphia and 40 miles (64 km) west of Atlantic City.

== Notable incidents ==
On August 17, 2010, Brian Walters, Chief Pharmacist at FCI Fairton, pleaded guilty to stealing over $7,000 in drugs and supplies from the prison pharmacy that he supervised. An investigation revealed that from July 2008 to July 2009, Walters stole the drug nalbuphine hydrochloride, an opiate-based pain reliever, and other supplies, including hypodermic needles. Walters also ordered extra quantities of the drug through his position as Chief Pharmacist and took the drug and supplies in order to use the drug himself. The stolen drugs and needles were worth over $7,000. He was sentenced on December 1, 2010, to a three-year term of probation, $7,041.44 in restitution and a $1,000 fine.

An FBI investigation in early 2012 found that FCI Fairton Correction Officer Job Brown, 39, accepted $3,600 in bribes in exchange for smuggling contraband in and out of the facility. Between January 2012 and March 14, 2012, he accepted two separate cash payments – $1,100 and $2,500 – in exchange for using his position to smuggle tobacco and vitamin supplements to a prisoner inside the facility. Brown also smuggled approximately 900 U.S. postage stamps out of the facility for the same inmate's benefit. Tobacco is prohibited at FCI Fairton, and inmates are also not allowed to possess more than 60 United States postage stamps, or vitamin supplements, which are not purchased through the prison commissary. Brown pleaded guilty to accepting bribes in June 2012 and was sentenced to one year in prison.

== Notable inmates ==
Inmate name	Register number	Status	Details
Nicodemo Scarfo, Jr.	01381-748	Serving a 30-year sentence; scheduled for release in 2036.	Soldier in the Lucchese crime family and former captain of the Jersey Crew he is also the son of deceased mobster Nicodemo Scarfo Sr.; convicted in 2014 of racketeering, conspiracy, money laundering and other crimes for masterminding a scheme to steal $12 million from FirstPlus Financial Group, a Texas-based financial firm.
Lamor Whitehead	36692-510	Serving a 9-year sentence	Pastor convicted of fraud
Christian Lee Dedmon	71503-510	Serving a 40-year sentence	Rankin County (Mississippi) Sheriff's Deputy involved in the Rankin County Goon Squad torture incident.
George Santos	58474-510	Was serving a 7-year sentence; released after 3 months on October 17, 2025 after President Donald Trump commuted his sentence.	Former United States House of Representatives member from New York's 3rd congressional district. Plead guilty to wire fraud and aggravated identity theft in 2024, began serving sentence on July 25, 2025.
Luke Sommer	38474-086	Scheduled for release in 2034.	Former US Army Ranger who pleaded guilty to orchestrating an armed robbery of a Bank of America branch in Tacoma, Washington on August 7, 2006. Sentenced to 24 years initially in 2008 but was given another 20-year sentence for attempting to hire an undercover FBI task force officer to murder an Assistant United States Attorney. Sentence was reduced in 2022 to 31 years following a judicial review of his rehabilitation and reform.

== See also ==
- List of U.S. federal prisons
- Incarceration in the United States
