= Deerfield Township School District =

School district in Cumberland County, New Jersey, US

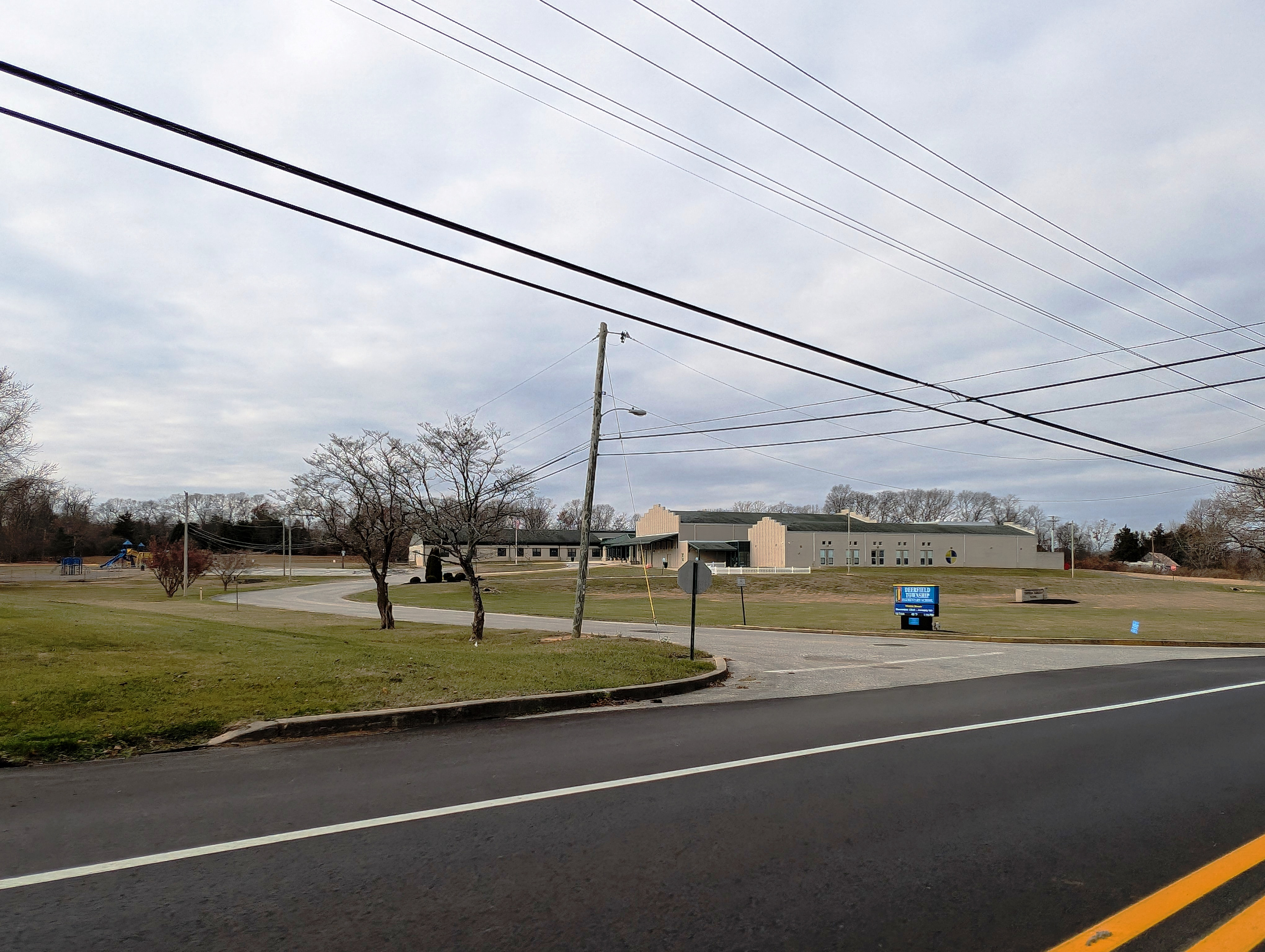
- Deerfield Township School, the only school in the district

Address
- 419 Morton Avenue Rosenhayn, Cumberland County, New Jersey, 08352; United States
- Coordinates: 39.48193°N 75.133728°W

District information
- Grades: PreK-8
- Superintendent: Dina Rossi
- Business administrator: Joseph Giambri Jr.
- Schools: 1

Students and staff
- Enrollment: 318 (as of 2023–24)
- Faculty: 34.0 FTEs
- Student–teacher ratio: 9.4:1

Other information
- District Factor Group: B
- Website: www.deerfield.k12.nj.us
Ind.	Per pupil	District spending	Rank (*)	K-8 average	%± vs. average
1A	Total Spending	$17,582	22	$18,891	−6.9%
1	Budgetary Cost	11,868	9	14,159	−16.2%
2	Classroom Instruction	7,779	14	8,659	−10.2%
6	Support Services	1,344	5	2,167	−38.0%
8	Administrative Cost	1,436	14	1,547	−7.2%
10	Operations & Maintenance	1,292	12	1,612	−19.9%
13	Extracurricular Activities	5	2	104	−95.2%
16	Median Teacher Salary	59,697	42	61,136
Data from NJDoE 2014 Taxpayers' Guide to Education Spending. *Of K-8 districts with up to 400 students. Lowest spending=1; Highest=71

The Deerfield Township School District is a community public school district that serves students in pre-kindergarten through eighth grade from Deerfield Township, in Cumberland County, in the U.S. state of New Jersey.

As of the 2023–24 school year, the district, comprised of one school, had an enrollment of 318 students and 34.0 classroom teachers (on an FTE basis), for a student–teacher ratio of 9.4:1.

The district had been classified by the New Jersey Department of Education as being in District Factor Group "B", the second-lowest of eight groupings. District Factor Groups organize districts statewide to allow comparison by common socioeconomic characteristics of the local districts. From lowest socioeconomic status to highest, the categories are A, B, CD, DE, FG, GH, I and J.

Public school students in ninth through twelfth grades attend Cumberland Regional High School, which also serves students from Fairfield Township, Greenwich Township, Hopewell Township, Shiloh Borough, Stow Creek Township and Upper Deerfield Township. As of the 2023–24 school year, the high school had an enrollment of 1,178 students and 83.5 classroom teachers (on an FTE basis), for a student–teacher ratio of 14.1:1. The high school district has a nine-member board of education, with board seats allocated to the constituent municipalities based on population; Deerfield Township has one seat on the board.

== School ==
Deerfield Township School served a total enrollment of 316 students in grades PreK–8 as of the 2023–24 school year (per the National Center for Education Statistics).

== Administration ==
Core members of the district's administration are:

- Dina Rossi, superintendent
- Joseph Giambri Jr., school business administrator and board secretary

== Board of education ==
The district's board of education is comprised of seven members who set policy and oversee the fiscal and educational operation of the district through its administration. As a Type II school district, the board's trustees are elected directly by voters to serve three-year terms of office on a staggered basis, with either two or three seats up for election each year held (since 2012) as part of the November general election. The board appoints a superintendent to oversee the district's day-to-day operations and a business administrator to supervise the business functions of the district.
