= Nicky Scarfo Jr. =

American mobster

- Born: Nicodemo Salvatore Scarfo Jr. June 9, 1965 (age 61); Atlantic City, New Jersey, U.S.
- Occupation: Mobster
- Spouses: Michele Winkler-Scarfo (m. 2001; div. 2008) Lisa Murray-Scarfo (m. 2008)
- Parent(s): Nicodemo Scarfo (father); Domenica Scarfo (mother)
- Relatives: Phil Leonetti (cousin)
- Allegiance: Philadelphia crime family Lucchese crime family
- Convictions: Racketeering conspiracy, securities fraud (2014)
- Penalty: 30 years’ imprisonment (2015)

Nicodemo Salvatore "Nicky" Scarfo Jr. (born June 9, 1965), sometimes known by the nicknames "Junior", "Nick Promo", and "Mr. Apple" is an American mobster and a member of the Lucchese crime family. Scarfo Jr. is the son of former Philadelphia crime family boss Nicodemo "Little Nicky" Scarfo Sr.

In 1989, Scarfo Jr. was the victim of an assassination attempt by a masked gunman on Halloween. The attempted hit, by a gunman wearing a Batman mask, occurred at Dante and Luigi's, an Italian restaurant in Philadelphia, Pennsylvania. After the murder attempt, his father arranged for him to be inducted into the Lucchese crime family in the mid-1990s. Scarfo Jr. became the caporegime of the Lucchese family's Jersey Crew in the early 2000s before getting arrested.

== Early life ==
Nicky Scarfo Jr. was born to Nicodemo and Domenica Scarfo. He has an older half-brother, Chris (born in 1957), also another older half- brother, Garibaldi (born in 1963), and a younger brother, Mark (born in 1970). Nicky is the first cousin of Phil Leonetti, an admitted former underboss of the Philadelphia crime family.

The Scarfo family moved from Philadelphia to Atlantic City, New Jersey before Nicky Jr.'s birth. Nicky Scarfo Jr. grew up on North Georgia Avenue in the Ducktown section of Atlantic City. His grandmother, Catherine Scarfo, owned the building and lived there. Nancy and Phil Leonetti also lived in the building. Despite his father's position within the Philadelphia mob, the Scarfos were not wealthy while Nicky was growing up.

In 1980, Scarfo Sr. became Philadelphia crime family's consigliere, and then in 1981 he was named family boss. Only then did the Scarfos begin to live a more lavish lifestyle. In 1983, Nicky graduated from Holy Spirit High School in Absecon, New Jersey. By one account, Nicky Scarfo Jr. was not involved in crime during his teens and did not intend to become involved in the syndicate. As one classmate noted, "When I knew him, he was a good guy. He was just a regular guy who tried to do the right thing and everyone knew who his father was, but we never talked about that."

== Philadelphia crime family ==
=== Early years in Philadelphia ===
After graduation, Nicky Scarfo Jr. allegedly became involved in organized crime. He became a close friend of Joseph "Skinny Joey" Merlino, the son of Scarfo crime family underboss Chuckie Merlino. However, the relationship with Joey Merlino was to prove inauspicious. Their friendship, which was very close, ruptured in 1988 when Chuckie Merlino was convicted of racketeering and sentenced to 45 years in a federal penitentiary. Merlino was then demoted by the elder Scarfo, and Nicky Scarfo Jr. allegedly ended his friendship with Joey Merlino at this time. Philadelphia crime family boss Ralph Natale later testified in court that Merlino "hated" Scarfo from this time onward.

In the late 1980s, Nicky Scarfo Sr. came under increasing legal pressure as the Federal Bureau of Investigation conducted a massive investigation of the Scarfo crime family's operations. Twenty members of Scarfo's organization were imprisoned, and many more came under indictment. Five members of the Philadelphia crime family turned state's evidence against the elder Scarfo, including soldiers Nicholas Caramandi and Eugene Milano, capos Thomas DelGiorno and Lawrence Merlino (Chuckie Merlino's brother), and underboss (and Scarfo relative) Phil Leonetti.

During the trial, Mark Scarfo attempted suicide on November 1, 1988. Mark, then only 17 years old, had been taunted for years by classmates about his father's criminal activities. Increasingly despondent over his father's possible imprisonment, Mark Scarfo hanged himself in the office of his father's concrete supply company in Atlantic City. He was discovered by his mother, and paramedics were able to resuscitate him. He suffered cardiac arrest and his brain was deprived of oxygen. He entered a coma where he remained until his death in April 2014. On November 4, 1988, just three days after Mark's suicide attempt, Nicky Scarfo Jr. and a friend assaulted a woman in an elevator at Hahnemann University Hospital in Philadelphia. The woman said the two men had looked menacingly at her, and she pretended to reach for a gun in her coat. The two men then punched her, pushed her to the floor, and kicked her several times. Scarfo was arrested for assault, convicted, fined, and put on probation for the incident.

Nicodemo Scarfo Sr. was convicted on November 19, 1988, on more than 32 counts of racketeering, which included eight counts of murder, four counts of attempted murder, two counts of illegal distribution of methamphetamine, one count of loansharking, 14 counts of extortion, and one count of illegal gambling.

Nicky Scarfo Jr. may have attempted to use his father's conviction as a means of rising within the syndicate. In October 1989, Scarfo Jr. bodyguard George Fresolone turned state's evidence and began wearing a wire. Fresolone taped Scarfo Jr. plotting the death of his cousin, Phil Leonetti, an act which would have allowed him to rise within the Philadelphia criminal organization:

My father says, he says, this one is definitely my responsibility. He can't rest. ... I told him, I says, "I ain't resting till it's f-ing done"... How can I rest? How could I sleep at night? ... It's always eating at me, eating at me.

The evidence was later used to help indict Scarfo Jr. on racketeering and conspiracy charges in 1990.

=== Halloween assassination attempt ===
His father's conviction severely undermined Nicky Scarfo Jr.'s position in the Philadelphia crime family, as many family members were angry at the elder Scarfo's alleged mismanagement of organized crime enterprises and his arrogance.

On the evening of October 31, 1989, Nicky Scarfo Jr. was dining at an Italian restaurant in Philadelphia when a man wearing a Batman mask and holding a plastic Halloween candy bag entered the restaurant and approached Scarfo's table. The man pulled a MAC-10 machine pistol from the bag and fired at Scarfo. He was struck eight times in the neck, arms and torso, but no vital organs were hit. Scarfo returned home just nine days later.

Theories for the hit took several forms. Initially, law enforcement officials believed that the hit had been ordered by one of the Five Families in New York City in an attempt to take over Philadelphia's organized crime operations. However, police later said they suspected Joey Merlino of being the gunman, with Nicky Scarfo Jr. seen as a proxy for his father—the message being that the elder Scarfo was no longer in control of the Philadelphia crime family. Merlino has steadfastly denied any involvement. However, Tommy Scafidi would testify in 2001 that Merlino was the gunman and that Merlino's second-in-command Michael Ciancaglini drove the getaway car. Scafidi said he was asked to participate in the hit, but refused. This was confirmed by testimony from former Philadelphia crime family boss Ralph Natale, who also turned state's evidence and said that Merlino told him about committing the crime while they served time together in 1990. At least one other mobster testifying on behalf of the government alleged that soldier Peter "Pete the Crumb" Caprio also knew of the hit and attempted to prevent it. Authorities also suspected Charles "Chaz" Iannece of the attempted murder because he delivered a controversial kiss on the cheek to Scarfo shortly before the gunman attacked.

== Lucchese crime family ==
=== Inducted into the Lucchese crime family ===
Nicky Scarfo Jr. became an unimportant player in the Philadelphia mob after the hit. He adopted a very low profile to avoid drawing attention to himself, most likely (police assumed) because he had few allies who would protect him. Scarfo moved to Newark, New Jersey, shortly afterward. George Fresolone was appointed as Scarfo's bodyguard, but Fresolone became an informant and recorded hundreds of hours of conversations with mobsters—including Scarfo. Law enforcement officials alleged that Scarfo Sr. arranged to have his son inducted into the Lucchese crime family New Jersey faction to protect him from further attempts on his life. According to a 2007 court affidavit filed by the New Jersey State Organized Crime Control Bureau, Scarfo Jr. was later "made" and elevated to the position of soldier within the Lucchese crime family—effectively protecting him from any additional murder attempts.

=== After the assassination attempt ===
As a member of the Lucchese crime family, Nicky Scarfo Jr. became involved in a number of criminal enterprises. In 1990, Nicky Scarfo and Gaetano "Tommy Horsehead" Scafidi were allegedly ordered to beat mobster Martin Angelina because he refused to stop associating with Chuckie Merlino. According to court testimony by Scafidi (who had turned state's evidence by this time), they beat Angelina with aluminum bats to make sure the bats wouldn't break. In August 1990, Scarfo was arrested on federal charges of racketeering and conspiracy to manufacture and distribute illegal video poker machines manufactured by Greyhound Electronics. He pleaded guilty and received a seven-year prison sentence in November 1993.

During his imprisonment, Scarfo was placed in "protective isolation" by prison authorities. Government officials claimed to have received information indicating that Scarfo's life was in danger in prison. Thus, they isolated him from the rest of the prison population, permitting him limited exercise and other time out of his cell. Scarfo and his attorneys claimed that no such information existed, and that the involuntary isolation was punishment for Scarfo's other alleged (but unproven) criminal activity. Scarfo sued, and a court ordered him returned to the general prison population in June 1994. Based on time already served, he was released in 1996.

Shortly after his release, Scarfo Jr. was indicted on aggravated assault charges and illegal weapons charges in May 1996 after a fight in an Atlantic City bar. He pleaded guilty, and was sentenced to 18 months in prison and probation.

=== New mob leadership relationship with Scarfo Jr. ===
The ruptured friendship between Scarfo Jr. and Merlino took on more ominous tones in the late 1990s. Scarfo Jr. had been released from prison in 1997, and largely sat out the Philadelphia mob war. But once Natale was in prison and Merlino was in control of the syndicate, it is alleged that Merlino focused his attention back on Scarfo. One mobster who turned state's evidence testified that in 1999 or 2000, Merlino allegedly sent capo Peter "Pete the Crumb" Caprio and associate Daniel D'Ambrosia to watch Scarfo and gather evidence about his movements so that a hit might be planned. Court testimony later asserted that Caprio also stopped a Merlino-ordered hit on Scarfo Jr while the elder Scarfo served time in a federal prison in Atlanta, Georgia.

In June 2002, Nicky Scarfo Jr. went to jail again. He had been arrested, convicted, and sentenced to 33 months in federal prison for helping to run a multimillion-dollar illegal gambling and loan sharking operation. Scarfo's wife, Michele, was expecting their first child, and he was permitted to remain free on bail until the child's christening. He also received three years' probation.

=== 2005–2010: Release from prison and FBI investigation ===
Scarfo was released from prison on April 6, 2005. The media reported that Scarfo moved to the Jersey Shore after his release and began an effort to take over the Philadelphia crime family. In March 2008, he purchased a $715,000 home on Hartford Drive in Egg Harbor Township, New Jersey.

Shortly afterward, federal investigators began tapping Scarfo's phones and put him under surveillance as part of an inquiry into an illegal gambling, extortion, fraud, and labor racketeering operation run by Scarfo's best friend and close mob ally, Andrew Merola. An Organized Crime Control Bureau affidavit made in 2007 alleges that Scarfo met Merola after moving to New Jersey in the early 1990s. Scarfo later became godfather to Merola's son. The affidavit claims that Scarfo helped manage Merola's illegal gambling operations in 1998 and 1999 after Merola was briefly jailed after being convicted of extortion. Although Scarfo was a "person of interest" in the case, he was never charged; Merola pleaded guilty and was convicted of several felonies in connection with the case in early 2010.

In December 2007, The Philadelphia Inquirer reported that Scarfo Jr. had been demoted within the Lucchese crime family in part because of ongoing media coverage of his activities and in part because he intended to start a mob war to gain control of the Philadelphia outfit.

Scarfo and his wife, Michele, divorced in early 2008, whereupon she immediately remarried.

Scarfo also allegedly was involved in the financial takeover FirstPlus Financial Group and the embezzlement of millions of dollars from the company. FirstPlus Financial is a Texas-based mortgage financing company which was very active in the mortgage industry until a financial downturn left it mostly moribund in the late 1990s. The company drew federal attention in 2006 when it suddenly became very active again. On May 8, 2008, the Federal Bureau of Investigation conducted a series of raids on the company, its subsidiaries, several other companies, a number of FirstPlus' corporate officers, and several private citizens. The financial records of Nicky Scarfo Jr., his ex-wife, Michele Scarfo-Winkler, his infant son Nicodemo Scarfo III, and Salvatore Pelullo (a businessman with convictions for bank and wire fraud) were also seized. Law enforcement officials also found two handguns at Scarfo's home; as a convicted felon, Scarfo could be charged with felony unlawful possession of a firearm. Based on the seized documents, federal prosecutors alleged that Scarfo and Pelullo took control of FirstPlus Financial Group in June 2007 and "transferred several million dollars between June 2007 and May 2008 to corporate entities controlled by Pelullo and Scarfo Jr." A later estimate put the amount of stolen money at $4.86 million. Federal prosecutors believe that Scarfo, Pelullo, and FirstPlus Financial officers engaged in bank fraud, mail fraud, wire fraud, interstate transportation of stolen property, and money laundering. They also accused Scarfo of using the bank to make numerous real estate deals, including the purchase of his Egg Harbor Township home. Scarfo's close friend and associate, Andrew Merola, was sentenced in late October 2010 to 10 to 12 years in prison for fraud, extortion, labor racketeering, loan-sharking, and sports betting. Law enforcement authorities revealed that some of the 39,000 wiretapped conversations in the Merola case include discussions of Scarfo's allegedly illegal activities concerning FirstPlus.

=== 2010 indictment ===
Scarfo was indicted on May 14, 2010, on gambling and racketeering charges for his alleged role in what law enforcement authorities claim was a $2 billion international sports-betting operation. He was one of 34 purported New York-based Lucchese crime family members or associates named in the indictment announced by the New Jersey Attorney General's Office. Scarfo pleaded not guilty, and his attorneys called the charges "trumped up", noting that Scarfo had not been arrested when the gambling operation had first been exposed in December 2008. Scarfo was identified in open court as a capo of the Lucchese crime family, and his bail was set at $350,000. Authorities alleged that Scarfo supervised all Lucchese crime family operations in New Jersey. In October 2011, Michael A. Maffucci, one of Scarfo's co-defendants, agreed to plead guilty in the scheme and testify against Scarfo.

=== 2011 indictment and imprisonment ===
On November 1, 2011, Scarfo was arrested by the FBI for what the agency said was his role in the attempt to take over and embezzle millions of dollars out of FirstPlus Financial Group. Scarfo's wife, Lisa Murray-Scarfo, was also indicted in the scheme, along with alleged Lucchese mob associate Sal Pelullo and several officials of FirstPlus. Scarfo's father and Victor Amuso were named as unindicted coconspirators. Federal authorities said Scarfo and his associates took $12 million from the loan mortgage company and used the money to buy luxury automobiles, houses, a jet aircraft, jewelry, and a yacht they named "Priceless". U.S. Attorney Paul J. Fishman said Scarfo used his proceeds to buy a $715,000 home, $25,000 in jewelry for his wife, a $100,000 Audi automobile, and mortgage payments on a home owned by his ex-wife. Fishman also alleged that Scarfo and his associates forced FirstPlus to pay $6 million and give 1.6 million shares of stock to Scarfo and Pellulo in exchange for two companies (Globalnet Enterprises and Rutgers Investment Group) that had almost no value. Prosecutors said they had 7,500 recorded telephone conversations in which Scarfo discussed his illegal activities, including one in which he talked about faked documents to hide his involvement and another in which he boasted of a $36,000-a-month consulting contract for which he performed no work. Scarfo earned $450,000 from his consulting contract, which ran from June 2007 to April 2008. Scarfo was convicted of racketeering conspiracy and securities fraud for the scheme in 2014, and sentenced to 30 years imprisonment in July 2015.

Scarfo is currently incarcerated at Fairton FCI in Fairfield Township New Jersey with a projected release date of May 2036.
