= Gouldtown, New Jersey =

Populated place in Cumberland County, New Jersey, US

- Census-designated place
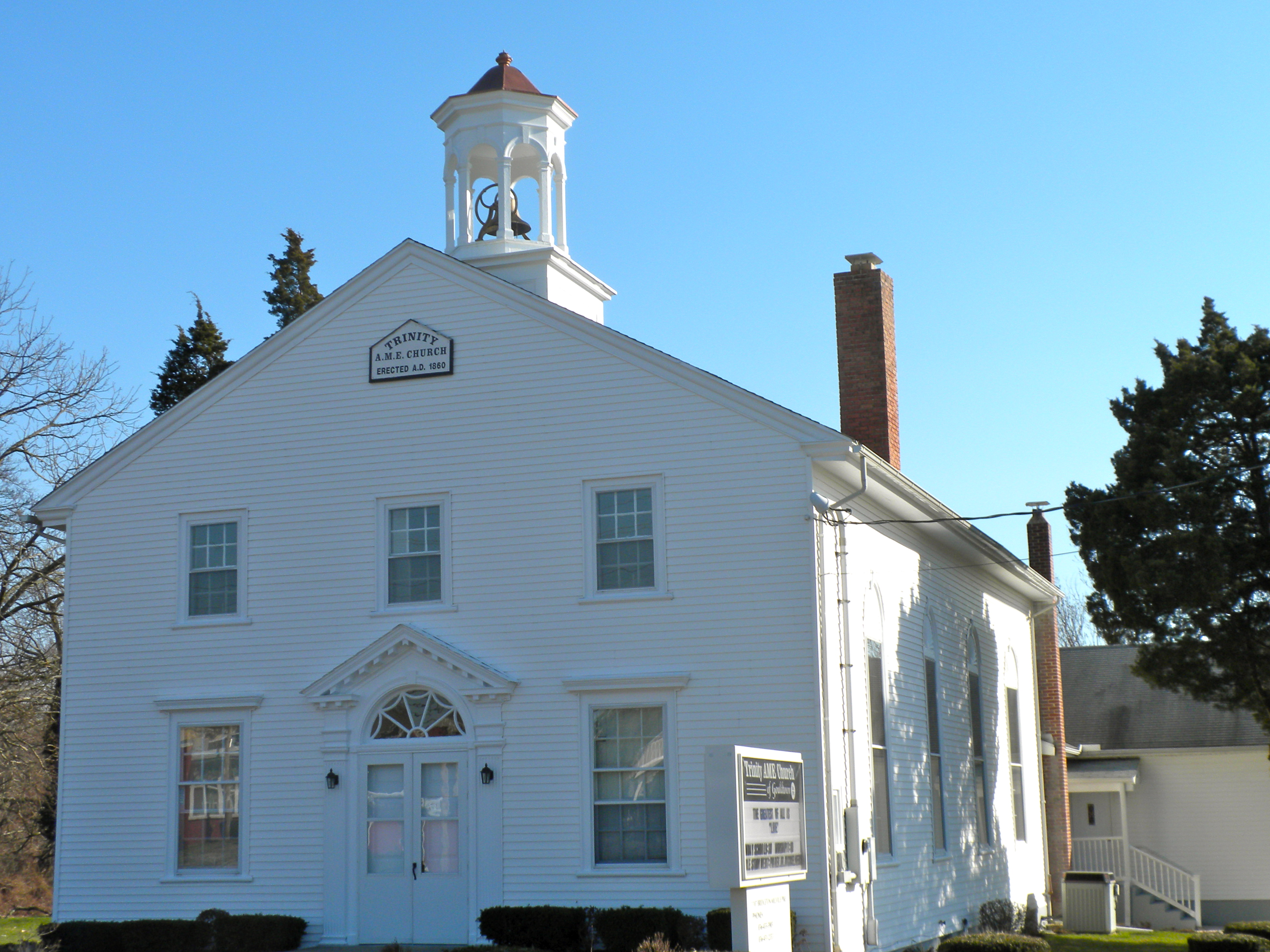
- Trinity African Methodist Episcopal Church

- Location in Cumberland County Location in New Jersey Location in the United States
- Coordinates: 39°24′44″N 75°11′15″W
- Country: United States
- State: New Jersey
- County: Cumberland
- Township: Fairfield

Area
  - Total: 2.83 sq mi (7.32 km^{2})
  - Land: 2.83 sq mi (7.32 km^{2})
  - Water: 0 sq mi (0.00 km^{2})
- Elevation: 76 ft (23 m)

Population (2020)
  - Total: 1,601
  - Density: 566.6/sq mi (218.76/km^{2})
- Time zone: UTC−05:00 (Eastern (EST))
  - Summer (DST): UTC−04:00 (EDT)
- ZIP Code: 08302 (Bridgeton)
- Area code: 856
- FIPS code: 34-27060
- GNIS feature ID: 2806089

Gouldtown is an unincorporated community and census-designated place (CDP) in Cumberland County, in the U.S. state of New Jersey. As of the 2020 census, Gouldtown had a population of 1,601. It is in the northwestern part of the county, in the northeast part of Fairfield Township, and it is bordered to the west by the city of Bridgeton, the county seat. New Jersey Route 49 runs through the community, leading east 8 miles (13 km) to Millville and west through Bridgeton 19 miles (31 km) to Salem.

== Demographics ==
As of the 2020 United States census, the population was 1,601.

Historical population
Census	Pop.	Note	%±
2020	1,601		—
U.S. Decennial Census; 2020

Gouldtown first appeared as a census designated place in the 2020 U.S. census.

=== 2020 Census ===
Gouldtown CDP, New Jersey – Racial and ethnic composition Note: the US Census treats Hispanic/Latino as an ethnic category. This table excludes Latinos from the racial categories and assigns them to a separate category. Hispanics/Latinos may be of any race.
Race / Ethnicity (NH = Non-Hispanic)	Pop 2020	% 2020
White alone (NH)	131	8.18%
Black or African American alone (NH)	1,036	64.71%
Native American or Alaska Native alone (NH)	87	5.43%
Asian alone (NH)	6	0.37%
Native Hawaiian or Pacific Islander alone (NH)	0	0.00%
Other race alone (NH)	9	0.56%
Mixed race or Multiracial (NH)	82	5.12%
Hispanic or Latino (any race)	250	15.62%
Total	1,601	100.00%

== History ==
Monroe Work catalogued it among "Negro" communities in his Negro Yearbook series.

Gouldtown was first listed as a CDP prior to the 2020 census. Trinity African Methodist Episcopal Church, organized in 1818, current building constructed in 1860, is listed on the National Register of Historic Places.

== Education ==
Students are zoned to Fairfield Township School District (for elementary school) and Cumberland Regional School District (for high school).

== Notable people ==
People who were born in, residents of, or otherwise closely associated with Gouldtown include:

- Harold Gould (1924–2012), baseball pitcher with the Philadelphia Stars of the Negro National League.
- Theophilus Gould Steward (1843–1924), U.S. Army chaplain, Buffalo Soldier, organizer of A.M.E. congregations in South Carolina and Georgia

== See also ==
- Delaware Moors
- Whitesboro, New Jersey
- Lawnside, New Jersey
- Springtown, New Jersey
