= Greyhound Electronics =

American electronics company (1982–2005)

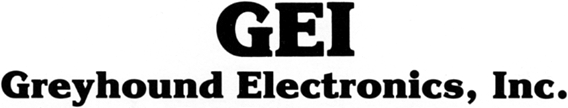
- Type: Public
- Industry: Amusement games
- Founded: August 1982; 44 years ago
- Founder: Edmund Florimont; Robert A. Holland; Carmen J. Ricci
- Headquarters: Toms River, New Jersey, United States

Greyhound Electronics, Inc. (GEI; sometimes spelled as Grayhound Electronics), was an American manufacturer of traditional and electronic amusement games based in Toms River, New Jersey. The company flourished in the 1980s and 1990s as a manufacturer and seller of arcade games, skill cranes and background music players, as well as various other amusement devices. The company's grey-market selling of its amusement-only video poker machines—illegally modified to pay out vouchers to customers—in the northeast and in California became known after its co-owners were arrested in 1990 on charges of racketeering, conspiracy and promotion of gambling (later downgraded to just promotion of gambling).

== History ==
=== Foundation and products ===
Greyhound Electronics was founded by Edmund Florimont (c. 1934 – August 4, 2019), Robert A. Holland (c. 1935 – July 11, 2011) and Carmen J. Ricci (c. 1939 – July 21, 2012) in August 1982. Florimont's father, Eugene N. Florimont, had his own amusement game company, the Greyhound Amusement Device Company, which he founded in 1946 to market his electro-mechanical greyhound racing simulation game—one of the first of its kind. Edmund Florimont previously worked with Ricci as co-owners of 200 arcades in New Jersey, as well as helping design electric shooting galleries for Disneyland and amusements for Bally. Holland previously worked for the Pennsylvania-based S&S Amusements. Holland met Florimont in the mid-1970s; in 1980 they started True-Data, a computer design company that performed contract work for Zenith Data Systems. The three formed Greyhound over a shared dissatisfaction with the state of arcade games in the early 1980s. They built a prototype for an arcade game to be exhibited at the November 1982 International Amusement Expo in Chicago. Holland laid out the circuit board for the game over seven 14-hour shifts, while the three devised an approach to user-replacement of the ROM chips onto which the game's software was burned. This feature, dubbed "satellite boards", was carried on to the company's commercial arcade games.

The three headquartered Greyhound at a repurposed concrete factory in Toms River, New Jersey. Florimont was made president, while Ricci was made sales manager with Holland as head of engineering. The first products they sold were mechanical scrolling signs. They quickly got into electronically programmable video displays with the release of the Greyhound-Vision system in 1983. The company had 40 employees in total that year. Florimont left Greyhound sometime in the mid-1980s, after which Ricci was made president. Ricci promoted his son-in-law, Brian Petaccio, to vice president of the company. During Ricci's tenure, Greyhound began focusing on manufacturing coin-op electro-mechanical games, video arcade games, skill cranes and background music players and on expanding their sales nationwide. The company became a prominent manufacturer of skill cranes for which they also supplied stuffed toys, while the coin-op games were provided pre-assembled or in kit form.

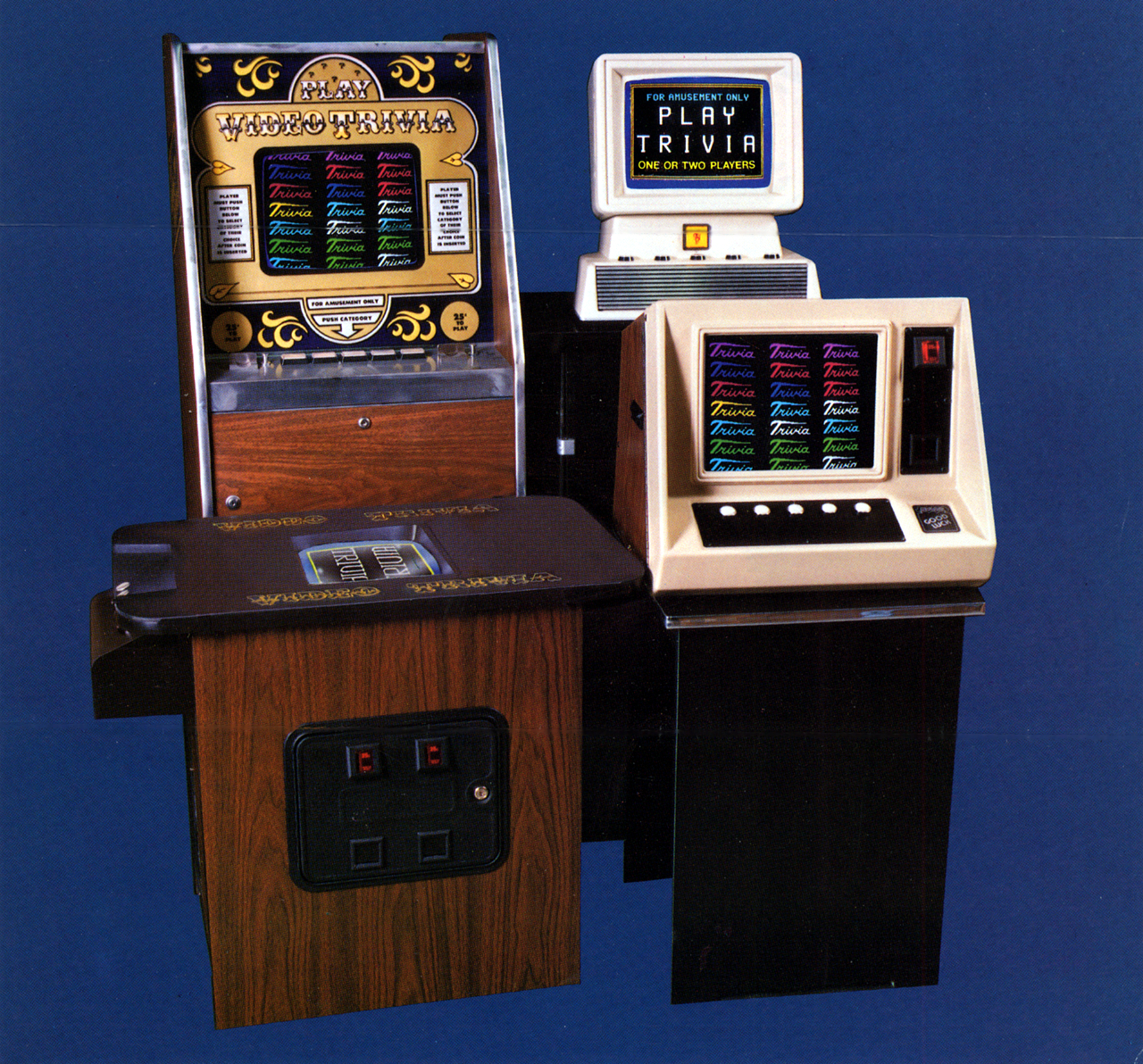
Greyhound's 1985 Video Trivia arcade game in various cabinets (clockwise from top left: upright, tabletop, countertop, and cocktail table)

Among the company's first video arcade games in 1984 was a video poker machine available in floor-cabinet, swivel-mounted table and countertop table chassis. Greyhound advertised the machine as an amusement game—no cash or prize redemption for winning—and emblazoned the machine with an "amusement only" sticker. Unique to this machine was its ability to take "satellite boards": expansion boards containing ROM chips burned with a specific poker game. As more games were developed, newer ROMs could be ordered from Greyhound to change the functionality of existing cabinets. Four games were offered at release, later expanded to eight. These games were developed back in 1982.

Greyhound earned a sponsorship from Coors Light in 1988 for a Super Shot–esque mini-basketball game that they built for a pizza parlor in King of Prussia, Pennsylvania. Another Super Shot clone, Greyhound Basketball, was a popular attraction and won an AMOA Games Award at the 1990 Amusement Expo.

Greyhound went public sometime after its founding, trading as a penny stock for most of its existence. A New York Times columnist in 1989 suggested that this was due to its largest customer being in default. The company's stock soared between the fall and summer of 1989, after the company announced No Fire, a ceramic-based flame-retardant coating for various surfaces that they would be licensing to companies nationwide and overseas. The shares reached a peak of $17.50 in October, up from $0.75 in July, but plummeted to $6.31 in November following a federal inquiry and subpoena of documents related to the company's trading. Petaccio resigned as vice president sometime between then and early 1990. No Fire was later determined to be a derivative product. Interest in No Fire was briefly renewed in fall 1990, but shares dropped again in October that year. Greyhound sold the rights to PNF Industries of Upper Saddle River, New Jersey.

=== Scarfo family dealings ===
Greyhound was a notorious grey-market seller of its video poker machines, with Ricci enlisting members of the Scarfo crime family of Philadelphia in the 1980s to help secure the company's products. Starting in 1985, Greyhound sold illegal video poker machines to numerous restaurants and bars in New Jersey, Pennsylvania, New York and California. Unlike Greyhound's legal "amusement only" machines, Ricci had these machines modified to pay out cash vouchers. He collected fees from the bars' owners and contributed half of his profits to Nicky Scarfo Jr. on a bi-weekly basis. The Scarfo family in turn protected Greyhound from competitors within the northeast and helped Ricci find additional "stops" (locations) for his machines. The machines could be reverted via remote control to a mode in which they operated as legal amusements only. George Fresolone, a Scarfo bodyguard-turned-informant explained in 1991: "The cops come in. You hit a switch ... there's no pinch because there's no gambling".

Ricci's proceeds to the Scarfo family ranged from $3,000 to $4,000 a week. Ricci had the Scarfo family protect roughly 25 locations in the northeast; Fresolone contended in 1991 that the total number of locations where Ricci had their illegal machines was more than four times this amount. In early 1989, the Scarfo family had a dispute over the amount Ricci was contributing and sent him, Scarfo Jr. and several other mob associates to a restaurant in South Philadelphia to settle it in a conversation. (Note: Scarfo Jr. survived an assassination attempt at the same restaurant in October 1989.) Their relationship recovered to the point where Ricci asked Fresolone to buy stock in Greyhound in fall 1989. Fresolone declined but passed the message on to several Scarfo family members including Scarfo Jr., as well as members of the Genovese crime family—all of whom bought into the company. After they announced No Fire, Greyhound's stock rose dramatically. (Note: Even after the stock plummeted, Fresolone still regretted the decision not to buy into Greyhound.)

In California, Greyhound's machines were sold illegally to bars and restaurants in Westminster and Garden Grove. Ricci sold directly to businesses within the Little Saigon district of Westminster, according to the Pennsylvania Crime Commission, while a crime ring based in Las Vegas was reported to have illegally resold Greyhound's machines to the businesses within Garden Grove, according to a videotaped conversation between an undercover Garden Grove police officer and one of the ringleaders. Police conducted raids on 37 Orange County and Los Angeles homes and businesses, as well as a woodcraft shop based in San Clemente, in March 1990. They confiscated 79 illegal poker machines, the circuitry for some of them manufactured by Greyhound Electronics. Three members of the Las Vegas ring were arrested—two from San Clemente, California, and one from Toms River, New Jersey.

California investigators accused the ring of ordering kits from Greyhound—suspected to be the Deluxe 8 slot machine game kit—and bringing them from Las Vegas to California; meanwhile the San Clemente woodshop was suspected of building the cabinets for the machines. Police remarked that the raids halted the ring's expansion into San Jose. Shortly after the raids, police found an invoice from Greyhound for $64,750 worth of video poker machines. Dated January 1989, the invoice was marked as overdue. Detective Carl Olson told the Los Angeles Times: "Greyhound's not about to ship $65,000 worth of machines to anybody unless they know them. For them to ship first and let them pay later, they either had to know the person or the money's guaranteed by someone else". Ricci was later found to be directly connected to the Las Vegas ring.

Greyhound also operated in the grey market with video slot machines sold to Native American reservations in the 1980s. At the time, slot machines were legal only in the state of Nevada and Atlantic City, New Jersey. Gambling in Indian reservations had been explicitly outlawed at the federal level by the Johnson Act of 1951, excepting bingo halls. Manufacturers found guilty of supplying slot machines outside of Nevada and Atlantic City, including these Indian reservations, had their licenses to sell their machines to Nevada and Atlantic City revoked. Slot machines were nevertheless still plentiful and popular in reservations during the period that they were illegal. In 1987, Ricci sold versions of its voucher-enabled video poker machines to the White Earth Nation, who owned a bingo hall on their reservation in Minnesota. The deal was mediated through Victor Collucci, a sales representative of GTECH, a company based in Rhode Island that was a major supplier of electronic lottery machines and that was vying for a manufacturing contract for the Minnesota State Lottery.

=== Arrest of co-owners ===
Following Fresolone's submission of his testimony and recorded conversations to New Jersey's Organized Crime Task Force, 41 members and associates of the Bruno and Scarfo crime families of Philadelphia and DeCavalcante crime family of New Jersey were arrested on August 22, 1990, all on charges of racketeering. Carmen Ricci, Petaccio and Alan Cifelli of Greyhound were among the arrested, as was Scarfo Jr. In addition to racketeering, Ricci, Petaccio and Cifelli were charged with promoting gambling, possession of a gambling device and conspiracy. All three were released on bail pending sentencing in 1991. Ricci formally resigned as chairman of Greyhound in November 1990 while retaining his shares of the company. Ricci had no successor in place; his brother Thomas Ricci soon took over his position as chairman. Ricci, Petaccio and Cifelli were indicted in March 1991, the grand jury of New Jersey seeking forfeiture of the defendants' shares in Greyhound. All three pleaded guilty in November 1991, agreeing to permanently sever ties with Greyhound and sell all their stock in the company. The state of New Jersey dropped its attempt to liquidate Greyhound Electronics' assets simultaneously, allowing the company to remain in business under the condition that the company agreed to pay a $500,000 settlement to the state under supervision for the next five years.

Ricci was ultimately sentenced to three years' probation and fined $500,000 by the state of New Jersey. The state dropped the racketeering charges against Petaccio and Cifelli and sentenced them both to 18 months' probation for promoting gambling. Greyhound continued to operate for several years, reporting $4.4 million in sales and gross profits of $1.2 million in the first half of 1991 despite the company's legal troubles. The Casino Control Commission of New Jersey banned Greyhound from selling amusement-only versions of its machines to casinos in Atlantic City, but they were later allowed to withdraw their application to continue their partnerships with those casinos. Illegal Greyhound video poker machines were still in circulation during this time, with fifteen being traced to taverns in Wisconsin by state investigators in 1992.

New Jersey state records listed Greyhound as inactive in 2005. Carmen Ricci died in 2012, predeceased by his brother Thomas Ricci.
