= Fairton, New Jersey =

Populated place in Cumberland County, New Jersey, US

- Census-designated place
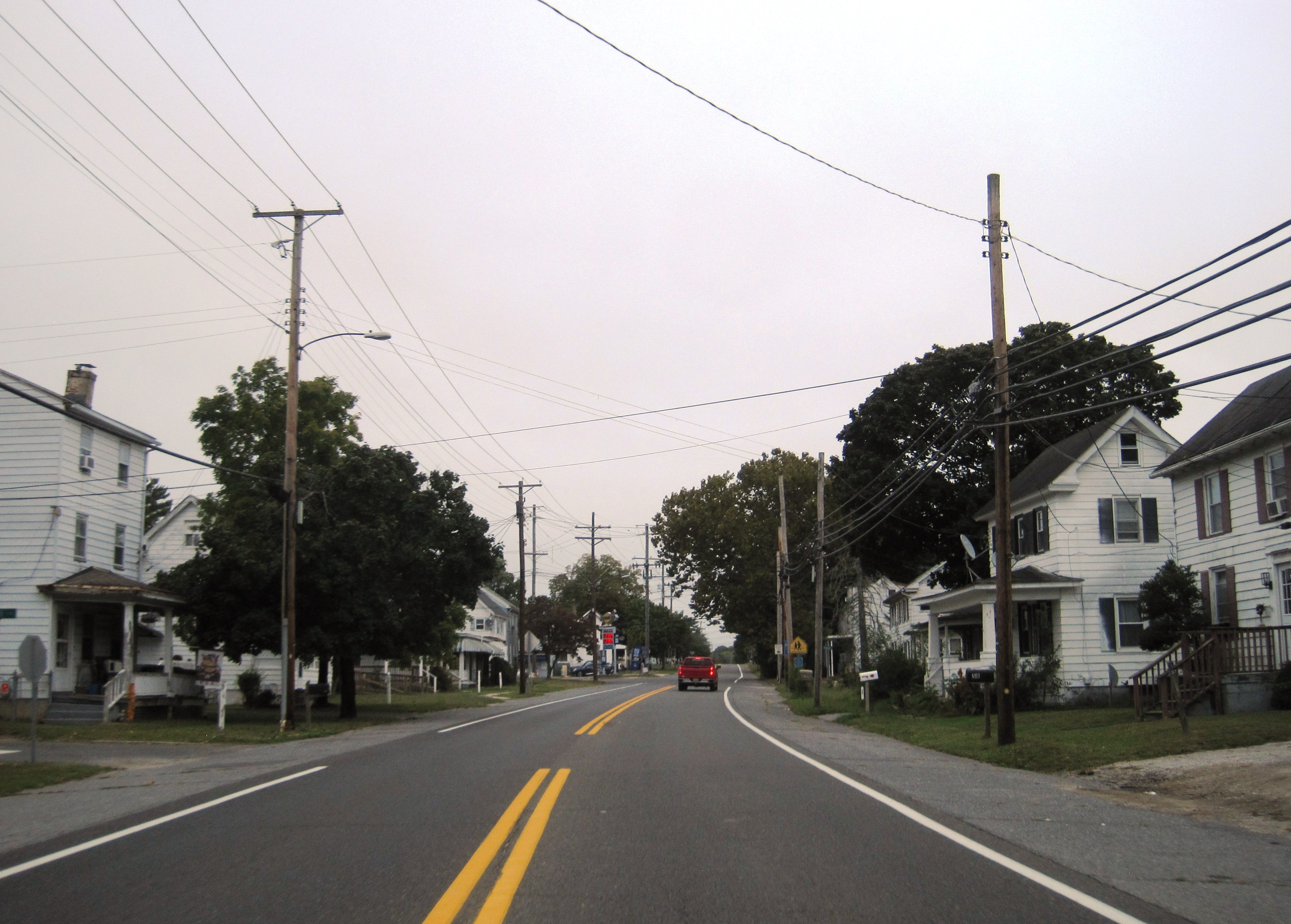
- CR 553 northbound in Fairton

- Map of Fairton highlighted within Cumberland County. Right: Location of Cumberland County in New Jersey.

- Location in Cumberland County Location in New Jersey Location in the United States
- Coordinates: 39.373352°N 75.208845°W
- Country: United States
- State: New Jersey
- County: Cumberland
- Township: Fairfield

Area
  - Total: 2.98 sq mi (7.73 km^{2})
  - Land: 2.87 sq mi (7.43 km^{2})
  - Water: 0.12 sq mi (0.30 km^{2}) 4.29%
- Elevation: 26 ft (8 m)

Population (2020)
  - Total: 1,060
  - Density: 369.5/sq mi (142.65/km^{2})
- Time zone: UTC−05:00 (Eastern (EST))
  - Summer (DST): UTC−04:00 (Eastern (EDT))
- ZIP Code: 08320
- Area code: 856
- FIPS code: 34-22530
- GNIS feature ID: 02389066

Fairton is an unincorporated community and census-designated place (CDP) located within Fairfield Township, in Cumberland County, in the U.S. state of New Jersey. It is part of the Vineland-Millville-Bridgeton Primary Metropolitan Statistical Area for statistical purposes. As of the 2020 census, Fairton had a population of 1,060.

== History ==
This area was occupied historically by the Lenape and Nanticoke peoples, both part of the Algonquian languages family of the Atlantic coast. Their territory was encroached on by European-American settlers from colonial times.

The first industry in Fairfield was a mill, established by English settler Samuel Fithian. He owned part of the Grist Mill on Forke Creek before 1702. No information has been discovered on the other owners, but the shares were probably held in common. At some time before 1763, the owners moved the mill dam to near Clarks Pond Road. The mill was owned by David Clark from 1759 to 1843.

In the 1810s, a pork and beef business was the principal industry in this area. In the center of town was a busy public wharf, from which were shipped vegetables, fish and lumber to large city markets. Fairton was also active in the boatbuilding industry; between 1850 and 1897, its yards built three sloops.

In 1978, the Indigenous peoples based in Cumberland County reorganized as the Nanticoke Lenni-Lenape Tribal Nation. Their cultural center is based in Fairton, and their tribal headquarters in Bridgeton. The tribe said that in 2016 they had 3,000 enrolled members, whose membership is based on documented descent from core families and blood quantum. The tribe has not obtained federal recognition. They contend that a state resolution recognized them, but in March 2016 a state court of New Jersey said that the state has not officially recognized any American Indian tribe in its territory and had no process to do so. Tribal members have lived for centuries in Cumberland and Salem counties in present-day New Jersey.

== Geography ==
According to the United States Census Bureau, the CDP had a total area of 2.988 square miles (7.74 km^{2}), including 2.860 square miles (7.41 km^{2}) of land and 0.128 square miles (0.33 km^{2}) of water (4.29%).

== Demographics ==
Historical population
Census	Pop.	Note	%±
1980	1,107		—
1990	1,359		22.8%
2000	2,253		65.8%
2010	1,264		−43.9%
2020	1,060		−16.1%
Population sources: 1950 1960 1970; 1980 1990 2000; 2010 2020

Fairton first appeared as a census designated place in the 1980 U.S. census.

=== 2020 census ===
Fairton CDP, New Jersey – Racial and ethnic composition Note: the US Census treats Hispanic/Latino as an ethnic category. This table excludes Latinos from the racial categories and assigns them to a separate category. Hispanics/Latinos may be of any race.
Race / Ethnicity (NH = Non-Hispanic)	Pop 2000	Pop 2010	Pop 2020	% 2000	% 2010	% 2020
White alone (NH)	1,194	866	658	53.00%	68.51%	62.08%
Black or African American alone (NH)	704	156	159	31.25%	12.34%	15.00%
Native American or Alaska Native alone (NH)	45	60	46	2.00%	4.75%	4.34%
Asian alone (NH)	25	9	1	1.11%	0.71%	0.09%
Native Hawaiian or Pacific Islander alone (NH)	0	0	0	0.00%	0.00%	0.00%
Other race alone (NH)	1	8	4	0.04%	0.63%	0.38%
Mixed race or Multiracial (NH)	24	63	44	1.07%	4.98%	4.15%
Hispanic or Latino (any race)	260	102	148	11.54%	8.07%	13.96%
Total	2,253	1,264	1,060	100.00%	100.00%	100.00%

=== 2010 census ===
The 2010 United States census counted 1,264 people, 529 households, and 354 families in the CDP. The population density was 442.0 people per square mile (170.7 people/km^{2}). There were 573 housing units at an average density of 200.4 units per square mile (77.4 units/km^{2}). The racial makeup was 71.76% (907) White, 12.82% (162) Black or African American, 4.83% (61) Native American, 0.71% (9) Asian, 0.00% (0) Pacific Islander, 4.03% (51) from other races, and 5.85% (74) from two or more races. Hispanic or Latino of any race were 8.07% (102) of the population.

Of the 529 households, 23.4% had children under the age of 18; 45.4% were married couples living together; 16.3% had a female householder with no husband present and 33.1% were non-families. Of all households, 28.4% were made up of individuals and 12.7% had someone living alone who was 65 years of age or older. The average household size was 2.39 and the average family size was 2.90.

20.1% of the population were under the age of 18, 8.7% from 18 to 24, 23.3% from 25 to 44, 29.4% from 45 to 64, and 18.6% who were 65 years of age or older. The median age was 43.7 years. For every 100 females, the population had 92.7 males. For every 100 females ages 18 and older there were 89.1 males.

=== 2000 census ===
As of the 2000 United States census there were 2,253 people, 474 households, and 334 families residing in the CDP. The population density was 308.5 people/km^{2} (799 people/mi^{2}). There were 511 housing units at an average density of 70.0 units/km^{2} (181 units/mi^{2}). The racial makeup of the CDP was 61.43% White, 33.38% African American, 2.35% Native American, 1.20% Asian, 0.18% from other races, and 1.46% from two or more races. Hispanic or Latino of any race were 11.54% of the population.

There were 474 households, out of which 26.8% had children under the age of 18 living with them, 53.0% were married couples living together, 11.8% had a female householder with no husband present, and 29.5% were non-families. 24.9% of all households were made up of individuals, and 11.4% had someone living alone who was 65 years of age or older. The average household size was 2.46 and the average family size was 2.92.

In the CDP the population was spread out, with 11.5% under the age of 18, 9.0% from 18 to 24, 48.0% from 25 to 44, 23.3% from 45 to 64, and 8.3% who were 65 years of age or older. The median age was 36 years. For every 100 females, there were 265.7 males. For every 100 females age 18 and over, there were 313.9 males.

The median income for a household in the CDP was $37,962, and the median income for a family was $41,000. Males had a median income of $30,750 versus $25,326 for females. The per capita income for the CDP was $20,005. About 3.1% of families and 5.9% of the population were below the poverty line, including 4.6% of those under age 18 and none of those age 65 or over.

== Education ==
Students are zoned to Fairfield Township School District (for elementary school) and Cumberland Regional School District (for high school).

== Notable people ==
People who were born in, residents of, or otherwise closely associated with Fairton include:

- Nathaniel Clark Burt (1825–1874), Presbyterian clergyman.
- John T. Nixon (1820–1889), represented New Jersey's 1st congressional district in the United States House of Representatives from 1859 to 1863.
