= Temple Beth Hillel Beth Abraham =

Reform synagogue near Millville, New Jersey, United States

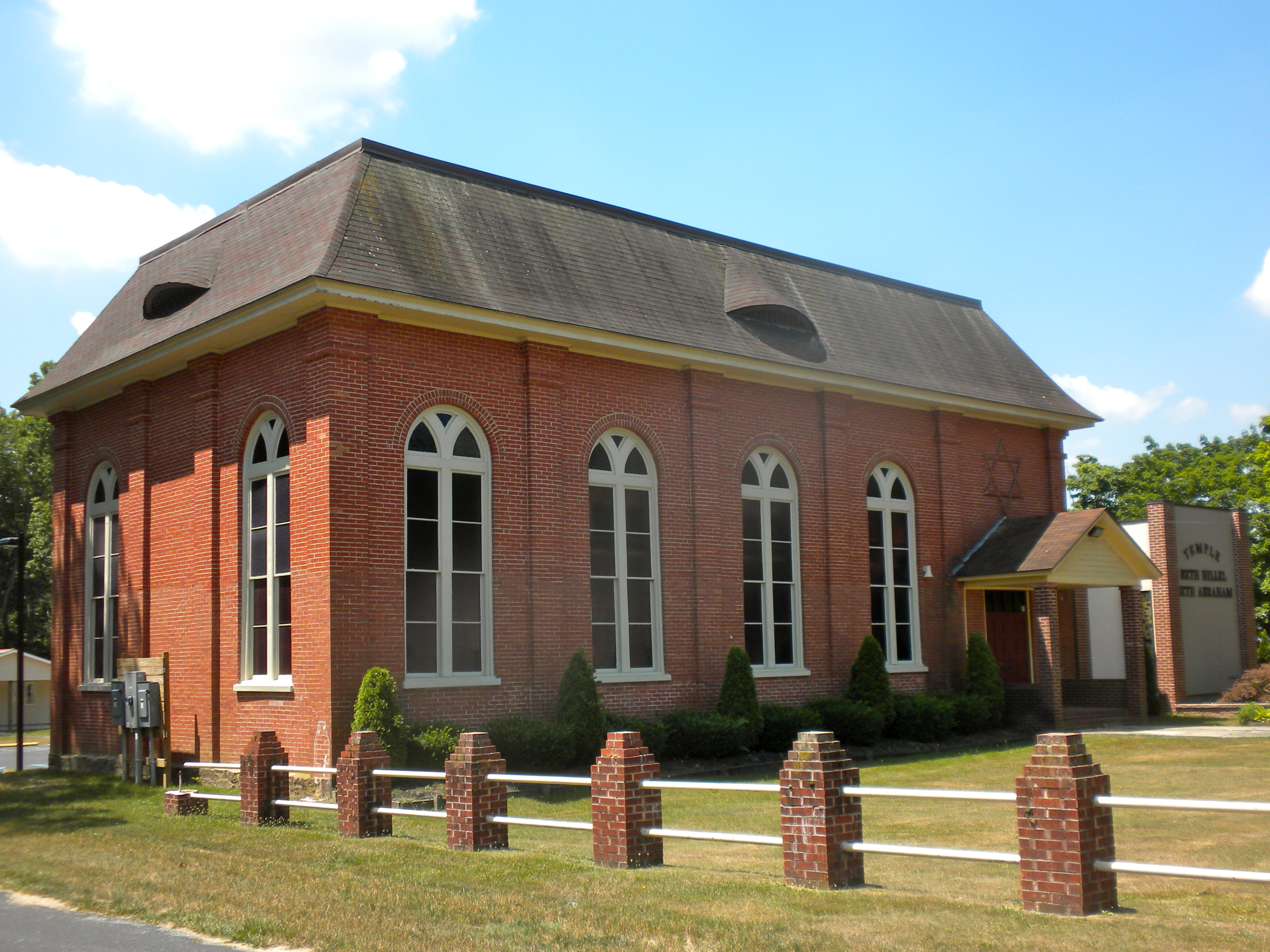
- The NRHP-listed synagogue, in 2010

- Location in Cumberland County, New Jersey

Religion
- Affiliation: Reform Judaism
- Ecclesiastical or organizational status: Synagogue
- Leadership: Rabbi Bradley N. Bleefeld
- Status: Active

Location
- Location: 547 Irving Avenue, Millville, Cumberland County, New Jersey 08332
- Interactive map of Temple Beth Hillel Beth Abraham
- Coordinates: 39°26′3″N 75°7′31″W

Architecture
- Type: Synagogue
- Style: Classical Vernacular
- Established: 2008 (merged congregation): c. 1880s (Beth Hillel); unknown (Beth Abraham)
- Completed: 1909

Specifications
- Direction of façade: North
- Height (max): 21 feet (6.4 m)
- Materials: Red brick

Website
- tbh-ba.org
- Beth Hillel Synagogue
- U.S. National Register of Historic Places
- New Jersey Register of Historic Places
- Area: 6.3 acres (2.5 ha)
- NRHP reference No.: 78001755
- NJRHP No.: 1036

Significant dates
- Added to NRHP: November 7, 1978
- Designated NJRHP: April 15, 1978

Temple Beth Hillel Beth Abraham, officially Congregation Temple Beth Hillel – Beth Abraham of Carmel, is a Reform Jewish congregation and synagogue located at 547 Irving Avenue in the Carmel section of Deerfield Township, near Millville, in Cumberland County, New Jersey, United States.

Formed in 2008 through the merger of Temple Beth Hillel in Deerfield Township, and Temple Beth Abraham in Bridgeton Township, the congregation worships in the former Beth Hillel synagogue that was built between 1901 and 1909. It was added to the National Register of Historic Places on November 7, 1978, for its significance in architecture and social history.

== History ==
=== Carmel and Deerfield ===
The Jewish settlement of Carmel, a small settlement in Deerfield Township, began in 1882, when a group of Russian families emigrated to the area, with the help of Michael Heilprin, to escape the large scale pogroms caused by the Eastern question. Heilprin, a Polish Jew, was a merchant who established, during the 1880s, small sweat shops for the purposes of producing clothing. Overcrowding in Carmel was common, with just thirty homes to accommodate approximately 280 Jews. In the early 1890s the sewing work had increased in size to the point where a three-story factory was built and several clothing related businesses were instituted. By 1900 Carmel had grown from 36 families to 89 and several more factories were put into operation, these provided the main source of income for the community.

The Beth Hillel synagogue was constructed between 1901 and 1909. Made of red brick and designed in the Classical Vernacular style, the synagogue reflects the nature of the working-class Carmel community. External features include corner and central pilasters, round arch windows with a pair of double hung sashes and overhead mullion. The interior features include a panelled wooden ark with carved gilded peacocks and a carved replica Torah, two stage bimah with turned newel posts, balusters and cyma, handrails, panelling and the upper gallery.

=== Bridgeton ===
Bridgeton, with a Jewish population of 600, had only one synagogue, Congregation Beth Abraham, that in 1963 followed Conservative practices.

== See also ==
- National Register of Historic Places listings in Cumberland County, New Jersey
