= Sea Breeze, New Jersey =

Populated place in Cumberland County, New Jersey, US

- Unincorporated community
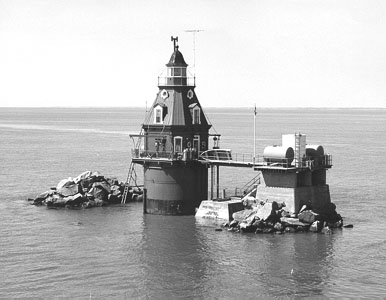
- Ship John Shoal Light

- Location in Cumberland County (Inset: Cumberland County in New Jersey) Sea Breeze (New Jersey) Sea Breeze (the United States)
- Coordinates: 39°19′16″N 75°19′13″W
- Country: United States
- State: New Jersey
- County: Cumberland
- Township: Fairfield
- Elevation: 3.3 ft (1 m)
- ZIP Code: 08302
- GNIS feature ID: 0880444

Sea Breeze is an unincorporated community located within Fairfield Township in Cumberland County, in the U.S. state of New Jersey. It is located on the shores of the Delaware Bay.

== History ==
Sea Breeze developed in the 19th century as part of the Delaware Bay oyster industry, which supported a number of small bayside communities in Cumberland County. The settlement attracted both watermen and summer visitors from Philadelphia.

In 1887, steamboat travel between Philadelphia and Sea Breeze began. After two aspiring businessmen from Gloucester restored an old Civil War boat (named the John A. Warner), a regular service was run throughout the summer to Sea Breeze's amusement pier. Later that year, The Warner House opened at Sea Breeze. The Warner House was a 40-room hotel, complete with a bar, and offered bathing as well as numerous recreational activities to visitors. Annual clambakes and boat races were also held. The Warner House burned down in 1890.

By the early 20th century, Jesse Smith built Sea Breeze's second hotel, The Seabreeze Hotel. During this time a man named Harry Griffith would rent rowboats on the bay, and is alleged to have provided alcohol during Prohibition. The new hotel suffered a similar fate as the Warner House and was destroyed by a fire in the 1940s.

Following the repeal of Prohibition, Griffith obtained a liquor license and opened the Sea Breeze tavern. Although it started out in a nearby barge, it later expanded to three rooms. By the 1940s, Griffith's daughter Mae had added food to the tavern. Although Harry Griffith died in the 1960s, the tavern was run by his family up until 1985, when it was destroyed by Hurricane Gloria.

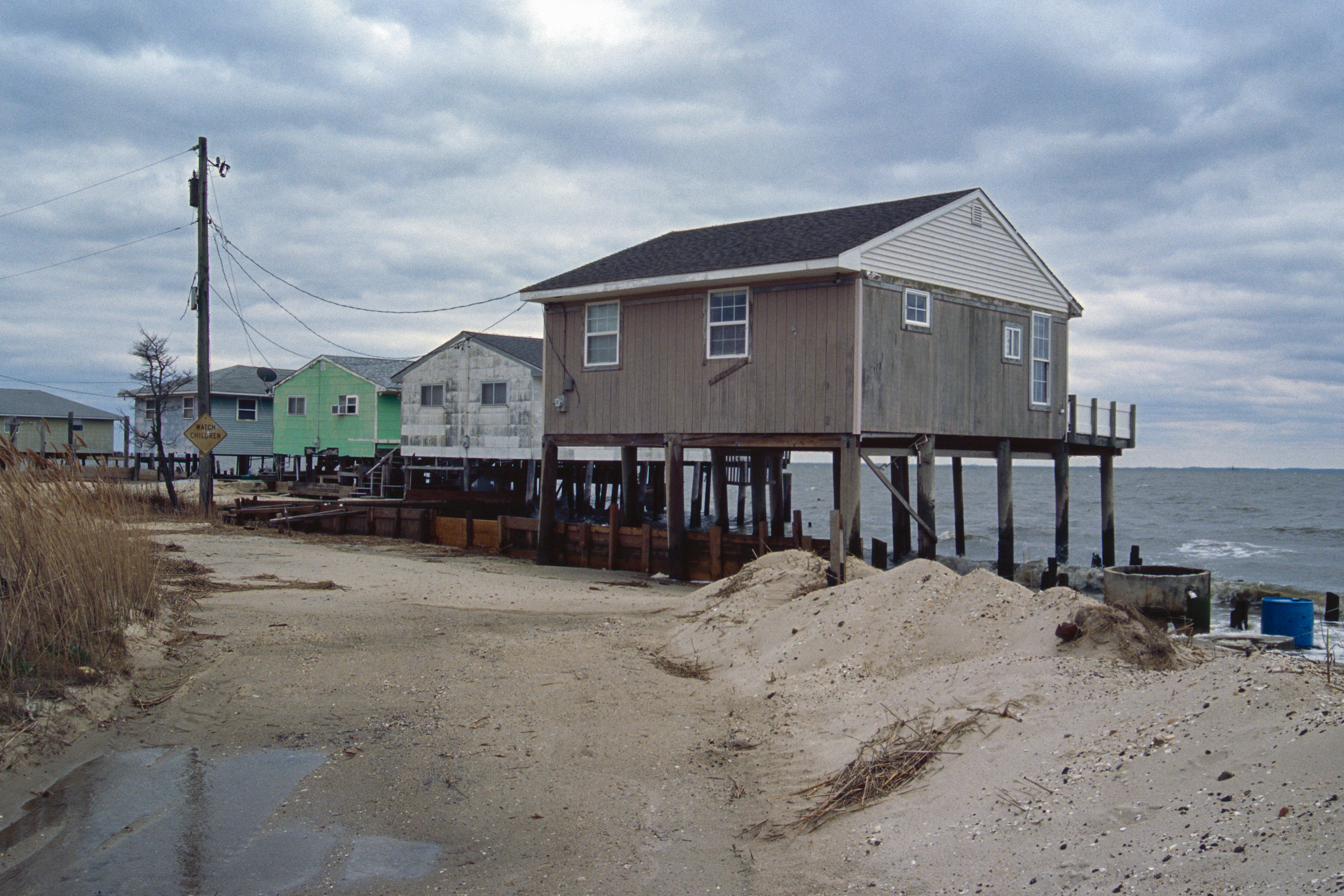
A row of summer houses in Sea Breeze

In November 2008, six of the nineteen homeowners in Sea Breeze petitioned the New Jersey Department of Environmental Protection to purchase their properties. A recently constructed seawall had been badly damaged by the waves, leaving the houses at risk. Over time, the remaining property owners also agreed to sell, and the houses were demolished.

Today, the hamlet contains a few disused seasonal homes and very few year-round residents. Its only road, Beach Avenue, remains unpaved. With no marinas or businesses, Sea Breeze is now primarily visited by saltwater fishermen and birdwatchers, and the surrounding land is managed as a nature preserve.
