= Nathaniel Clark Burt =

American Presbyterian clergyman

Nathaniel Clark Burt (April 23, 1825 – March 4, 1874) was an American Presbyterian clergyman.

== Biography ==
Burt was born in the Fairton section of Fairfield Township, Cumberland County, New Jersey, son of Daniel L. and Sarah Clark Burt. He was graduated from the College of New Jersey in 1846, then took a three years' course in the theological seminary. He was ordained by the Miami presbytery on November 1, 1850, and, after a five years' pastorate at Springfield, Ohio, was called to the Franklin Street Presbyterian Church in Baltimore in 1855, and in 1860 to the 7th Presbyterian church in Cincinnati. Dartmouth gave him the degree of D.D. in 1861.

Burt spent most of the years 1866 and 1867 in travel abroad for his health, visiting Europe, Egypt, and Palestine, where his investigations added much to our knowledge of the localities and sites of places mentioned in the Scriptures. He was at last compelled by failing health to give up his pastorate, and was president of the Ohio Wesleyan Female College from 1868 till 1870, when he was forced to resign this office also, and spent the rest of his life in southern Europe. Here he undertook the care of young ladies who wished to finish their education abroad, spending his winters in Rome, Dresden, or Nice, and making excursions to the principal cities of the continent. He died in Rome, Italy.

Burt wrote much for religious periodicals, and published A pastor's selection of hymns and tunes (Philadelphia, 1859); Hours among the Gospels (Philadelphia, 1865); The Far East: or, Letters from Egypt, Palestine, and other lands of the Orient (Cincinnati, 1867); and The Land and its Story (New York, 1869).
