= Rosenhayn Synagogue =

Synagogue in Rosenhayn, New Jersey, US

- Location in New Jersey

Religion
- Affiliation: Orthodox Judaism
- Ecclesiastical or organizational status: Synagogue
- Status: Active

Location
- Location: 600 Garton Road, Rosenhayn, New Jersey
- Country: United States
- Interactive map of Rosenhayn Synagogue
- Coordinates: 39°28′31″N 75°07′47″W

Architecture
- Established: 1888 (as a congregation)
- Completed: c. 1898
- Materials: Timber; clapboard

Rosenhayn Synagogue, commonly called Garton Road Shul, is an Orthodox Jewish congregation and synagogue, located in Rosenhayn, New Jersey, in the United States. Completed in 1898, the synagogue is one of fewer than 100 surviving nineteenth century synagogues in the United States.

It has been taken care of by the Ostroff family of Cumberland County, New Jersey.

The wooden, gabled, clapboard building was erected by a local Jewish agricultural colony, with historical links to Jews from Soviet Russia and Ukraine.
