= Southwind Vineyard & Winery =

American winery located in New Jersey

Coordinates: 39.447796°N 75.141078°W

- Location: 385 Lebanon Road, Millville, NJ, USA
- Coordinates: 39.447796 N, 75.141078 W
- Appellation: Outer Coastal Plain AVA
- First vines planted: 2006
- Opened to the public: 2012
- Key people: Joseph Riley & Lorre Allen (owners); Jamie Sherman (viticulturalist)
- Acres cultivated: 4
- Cases/yr: 800 (2013)
- Other attractions: Horse boarding, hunter pacing, picnicking permitted, pet-friendly
- Distribution: On-site, home shipment
- Tasting: Tastings Tuesday to Sunday
- Website: http://www.southwindvineyardllc.com/

Southwind Vineyard & Winery is a winery in Deerfield Township (mailing address is Millville) in Cumberland County, New Jersey. A family horse farm since 1978, the vineyard was first planted in 2006, and opened to the public in 2012. Southwind has 4 acres of grapes under cultivation, and produces 800 cases of wine per year. The winery's name reflects the Southern origin of the farm's original owners, and their desire to provide Southern hospitality.

== Wines ==
Southwind Vineyard is located in the Outer Coastal Plain AVA, and produces wine from Cabernet Franc, Cabernet Sauvignon, Chambourcin, Chardonnay, Concord, Malbec, Merlot, Muscat blanc, and Viognier grapes. Southwind also makes fruit wines from limes and peaches.

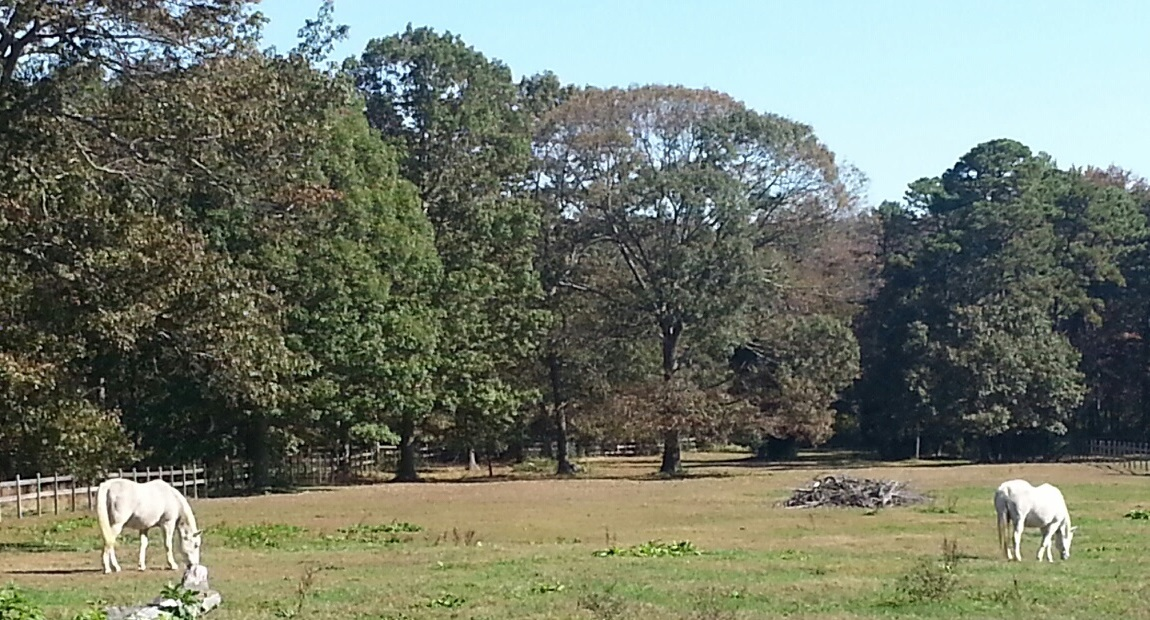
Besides making wine, Southwind offers horse boarding and hunter pacing.

== Features, licensing, and associations ==
The winery offers horse boarding and hunter pacing, and specializes in the use of Lippizan horses. Southwind has a plenary winery license from the New Jersey Division of Alcoholic Beverage Control, which allows it to produce an unrestricted amount of wine, operate up to 15 off-premises sales rooms, and ship up to 12 cases per year to consumers in-state or out-of-state. The winery is a member of the Garden State Wine Growers Association and the Outer Coastal Plain Vineyard Association.

== See also ==
- Alcohol laws of New Jersey
- American wine
- Judgment of Princeton
- List of wineries, breweries, and distilleries in New Jersey
- New Jersey Farm Winery Act
- New Jersey Wine Industry Advisory Council
- New Jersey wine
