= Rosenhayn, New Jersey =

Populated place in Cumberland County, New Jersey, US

- Census-designated place
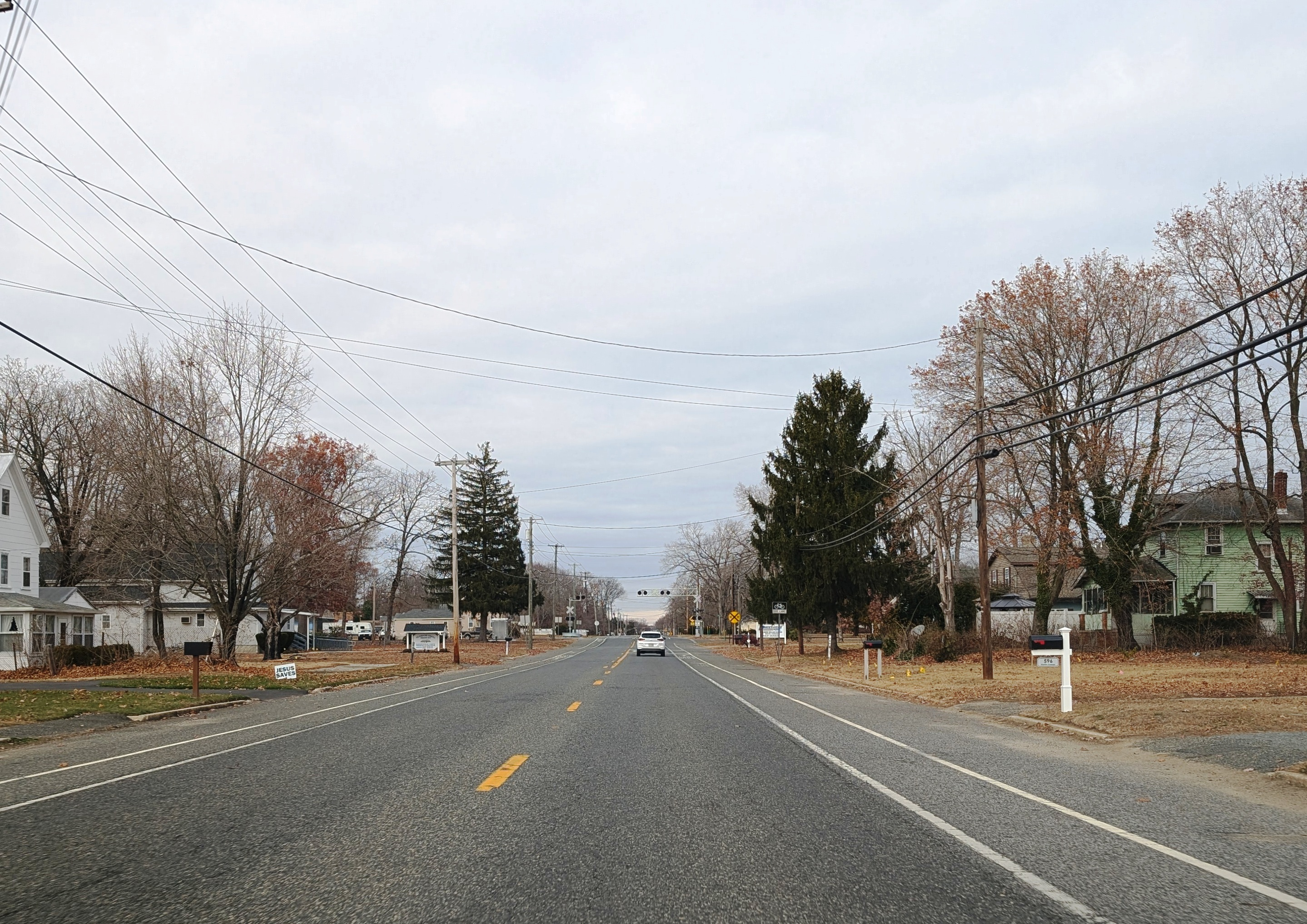
- Northbound Morton Avenue (CR 634) in Rosenhayn

- Map of Rosenhayn highlighted within Cumberland County. Right: Location of Cumberland County in New Jersey.

- Location in Cumberland County Location in New Jersey Location in the United States
- Coordinates: 39.47868°N 75.13791°W
- Country: United States
- State: New Jersey
- County: Cumberland
- Township: Deerfield

Area
  - Total: 2.65 sq mi (6.86 km^{2})
  - Land: 2.65 sq mi (6.86 km^{2})
  - Water: 0 sq mi (0.00 km^{2}) 0.00%
- Elevation: 108 ft (33 m)

Population (2020)
  - Total: 1,150
  - Density: 434.4/sq mi (167.74/km^{2})
- Time zone: UTC−05:00 (Eastern (EST))
  - Summer (DST): UTC−04:00 (EDT)
- ZIP Code: 08352
- Area code: 856
- FIPS code: 34-64740
- GNIS feature ID: 02389778

Rosenhayn is an unincorporated community and census-designated place (CDP) located within Deerfield Township, in Cumberland County, in the U.S. state of New Jersey. It is part of the Vineland-Millville- Bridgeton Primary Metropolitan Statistical Area for statistical purposes. As of the 2020 census, Rosenhayn had a population of 1,150.

Rosenhayn was founded as a Jewish agricultural colony and the 1898 Rosenhayn synagogue is one of the fewer than 100 surviving nineteenth century synagogue buildings in the United States.

== Geography ==
According to the United States Census Bureau, the CDP had a total area of 2.654 square miles (6.87 km^{2}), all land.

== Demographics ==
Historical population
Census	Pop.	Note	%±
1990	1,053		—
2000	1,099		4.4%
2010	1,098		−0.1%
2020	1,150		4.7%
Population sources: 1950 1960 1970; 1980 1990 2000; 2010 2020

Rosenhayn first appeared as a census designated place in the 1990 U.S. census.

=== 2020 census ===
Rosenhayn CDP, New Jersey – Racial and ethnic composition Note: the US Census treats Hispanic/Latino as an ethnic category. This table excludes Latinos from the racial categories and assigns them to a separate category. Hispanics/Latinos may be of any race.
Race / Ethnicity (NH = Non-Hispanic)	Pop 2000	Pop 2010	Pop 2020	% 2000	% 2010	% 2020
White alone (NH)	754	649	633	68.61%	59.11%	55.04%
Black or African American alone (NH)	208	181	199	18.93%	16.48%	17.30%
Native American or Alaska Native alone (NH)	6	12	8	0.55%	1.09%	0.70%
Asian alone (NH)	2	16	10	0.18%	1.46%	0.87%
Native Hawaiian or Pacific Islander alone (NH)	0	0	0	0.00%	0.00%	0.00%
Other race alone (NH)	0	5	4	0.00%	0.46%	0.35%
Mixed race or Multiracial (NH)	20	42	65	1.82%	3.83%	5.65%
Hispanic or Latino (any race)	109	193	231	9.92%	17.58%	20.09%
Total	1,099	1,098	1,150	100.00%	100.00%	100.00%

=== 2010 census ===
The 2010 United States census counted 1,098 people, 382 households, and 274 families in the CDP. The population density was 413.7 people per square mile (159.7 people/km^{2}). There were 404 housing units at an average density of 152.2 units per square mile (58.8 units/km^{2}). The racial makeup was 64.21% (705) White, 18.03% (198) Black or African American, 1.28% (14) Native American, 1.46% (16) Asian, 0.00% (0) Pacific Islander, 9.29% (102) from other races, and 5.74% (63) from two or more races. Hispanic or Latino of any race were 17.58% (193) of the population.

Of the 382 households, 34.8% had children under the age of 18; 51.0% were married couples living together; 16.2% had a female householder with no husband present and 28.3% were non-families. Of all households, 23.0% were made up of individuals and 10.5% had someone living alone who was 65 years of age or older. The average household size was 2.86 and the average family size was 3.36.

26.5% of the population were under the age of 18, 9.6% from 18 to 24, 24.8% from 25 to 44, 27.0% from 45 to 64, and 12.2% who were 65 years of age or older. The median age was 37.1 years. For every 100 females, the population had 98.2 males. For every 100 females ages 18 and older there were 92.6 males.

=== 2000 census ===
As of the 2000 United States census there were 1,099 people, 373 households, and 286 families residing in the CDP. The population density was 160.1 people/km^{2} (415 people/mi^{2}). There were 393 housing units at an average density of 57.3 units/km^{2} (148 units/mi^{2}). The racial makeup of the CDP was 70.43% White, 19.29% African American, 0.64% Native American, 0.18% Asian, 6.28% from other races, and 3.18% from two or more races. Hispanic or Latino of any race were 9.92% of the population.

There were 373 households, out of which 35.4% had children under the age of 18 living with them, 52.5% were married couples living together, 17.4% had a female householder with no husband present, and 23.1% were non-families. 17.7% of all households were made up of individuals, and 7.8% had someone living alone who was 65 years of age or older. The average household size was 2.93 and the average family size was 3.29.

In the CDP the population was spread out, with 29.9% under the age of 18, 7.6% from 18 to 24, 27.8% from 25 to 44, 21.6% from 45 to 64, and 13.0% who were 65 years of age or older. The median age was 36 years. For every 100 females, there were 94.2 males. For every 100 females age 18 and over, there were 93.5 males.

The median income for a household in the CDP was $38,702, and the median income for a family was $38,155. Males had a median income of $33,092 versus $22,216 for females. The per capita income for the CDP was $14,801. About 12.2% of families and 15.7% of the population were below the poverty line, including 12.1% of those under age 18 and 25.2% of those age 65 or over.

== Education ==
Students are zoned to Deerfield Township School District (for elementary school) and Cumberland Regional School District (for high school).

== Notable people ==
People who were born in, residents of, or otherwise closely associated with Rosenhayn include:

- Joseph W. Chinnici (1919–2007), politician who served in the New Jersey General Assembly from the 1st legislative district from 1972 to 1988.
- Frank LoBiondo (born 1946), politician who served as the U.S. representative for New Jersey's 2nd congressional district from 1995 to 2019.
- Al McCoy (1894–1966), boxing world middleweight champion from 1914 to 1917.
