= Trinity African Methodist Episcopal Church =

Historic church in New Jersey, United States

- U.S. National Register of Historic Places
- New Jersey Register of Historic Places
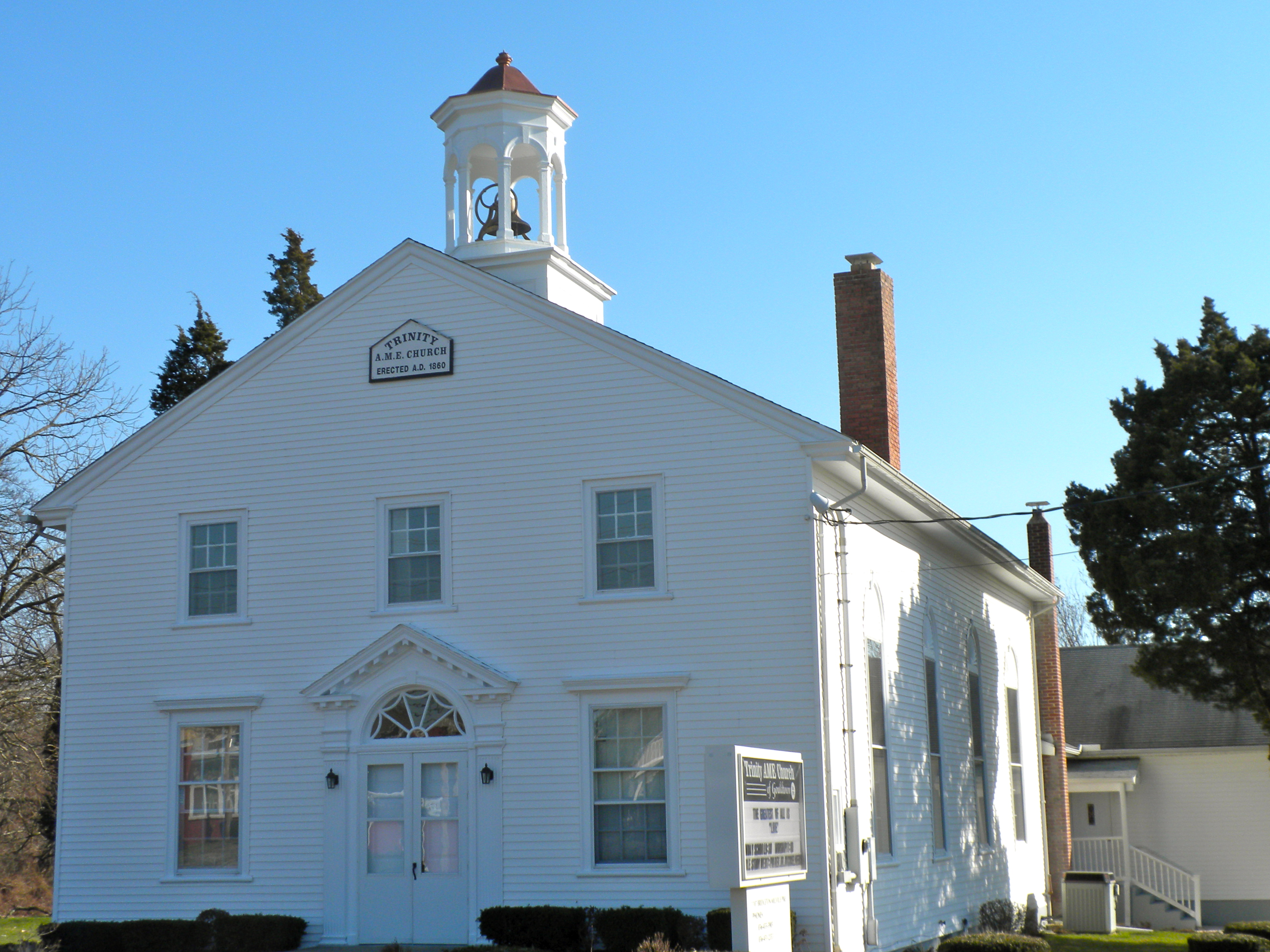

- Location within Cumberland County, New Jersey Location within New Jersey Location within the United States
- Location: New Jersey Route 49, Gouldtown, New Jersey
- Coordinates: 39°25′12″N 75°11′3″W
- Built: 1860
- Architectural style: Mid 19th Century Revival
- NRHP reference No.: 95001138
- NJRHP No.: 2807

Significant dates
- Added to NRHP: September 29, 1995
- Designated NJRHP: July 17, 1995

Trinity African Methodist Episcopal Church is a historic church located on New Jersey Route 49 (Bridgeton-Milltown Pike) in the Gouldtown section of Fairfield Township in Cumberland County, New Jersey, United States. The current church was built in 1860, on the eve of the American Civil War. It was added to the National Register of Historic Places on September 29, 1995, for its significance in religion and African-American history.

== History and description ==
Gouldtown is now just a crossroads with a few buildings, but it is one of the oldest settlements in America founded by free, land-owning African-Americans. The Rev. Ruben Cuff of Salem County organized a society of African Americans in 1818. In 1823 they bought an unused schoolhouse to use as a church, and in 1834 they bought a second schoolhouse and moved it to the site.

== See also ==
- National Register of Historic Places listings in Cumberland County, New Jersey
