= Deerfield Township, New Jersey =

Borough in Cumberland County, New Jersey, US

- Township
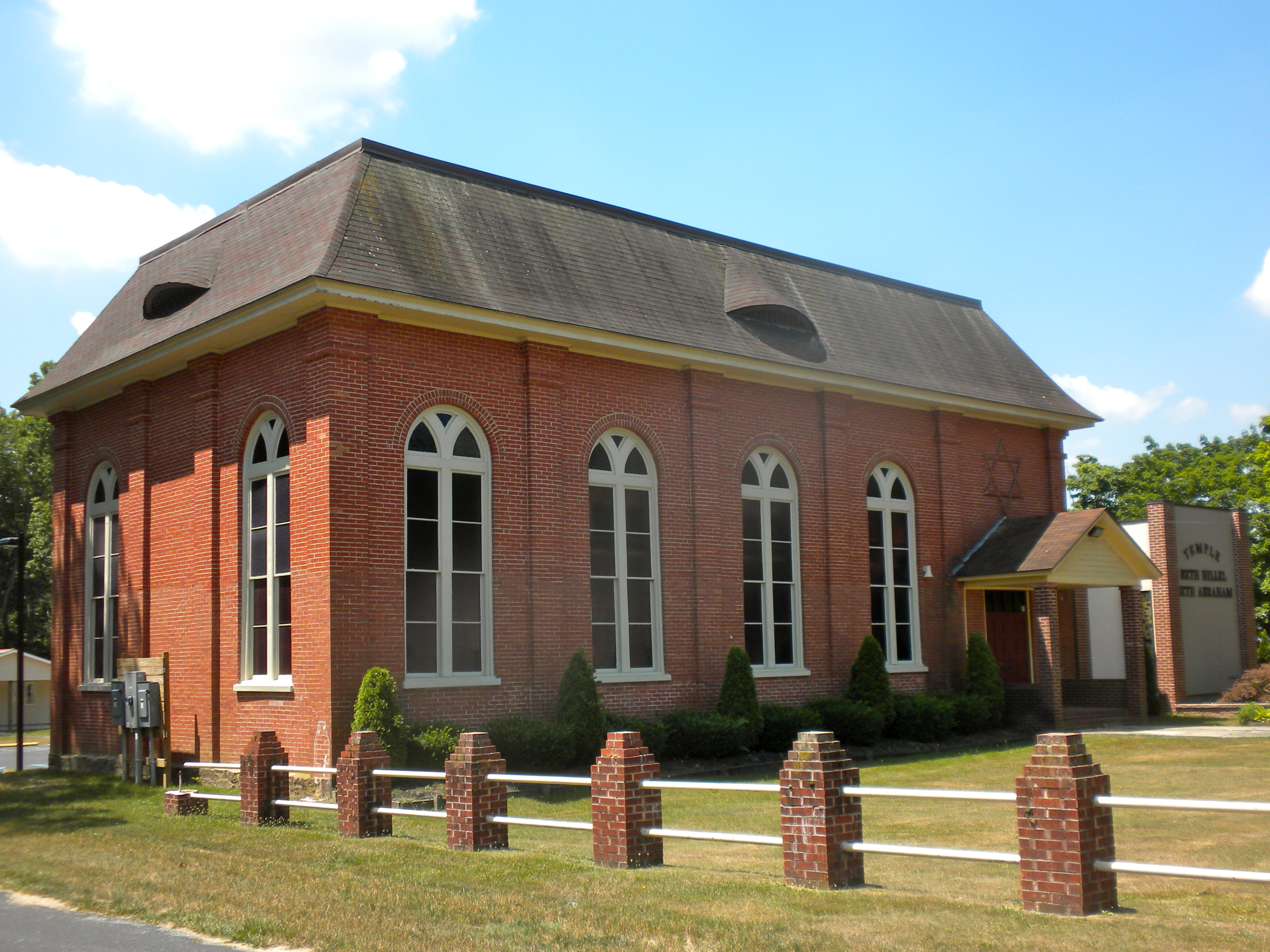
- Temple Beth Hillel Beth Abraham synagogue

- Seal

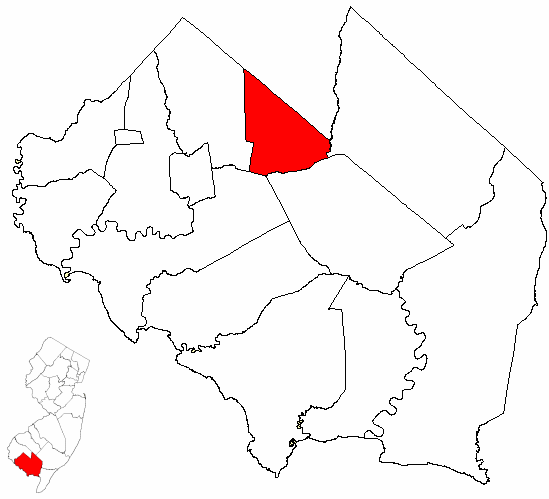
- Location of Deerfield Township in Cumberland County highlighted in red (right). Inset map: Location of Cumberland County in New Jersey highlighted in red (left).

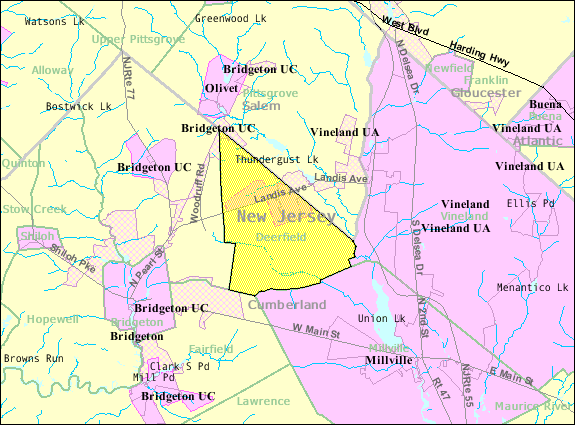
- Census Bureau map of Deerfield Township, New Jersey

- Location in Cumberland County Location in New Jersey Location in the United States
- Coordinates: 39.459043°N 75.131987°W
- Country: United States
- State: New Jersey
- County: Cumberland
- Formed: January 19, 1748
- Incorporated: February 21, 1798
- Named after: Deerfield, Massachusetts

Government
  - Type: Township
  - Body: Township Committee
  - Mayor: Abigail Perlstein O'Brien (R, December 31, 2026)
  - Administrator: DawnMarie Bascelli
  - Municipal clerk: Karen Seifrit

Area
  - Total: 16.88 sq mi (43.72 km^{2})
  - Land: 16.84 sq mi (43.62 km^{2})
  - Water: 0.039 sq mi (0.10 km^{2}) 0.22%
  - Rank: 166th of 565 in state 12th of 14 in county
- Elevation: 102 ft (31 m)

Population (2020)
  - Total: 3,136
  - Estimate (2023): 3,147
  - Rank: 443rd of 565 in state 9th of 14 in county
  - Density: 186.2/sq mi (71.9/km^{2})
  - Rank: 509th of 565 in state 6th of 14 in county
- Time zone: UTC−05:00 (Eastern (EST))
  - Summer (DST): UTC−04:00 (Eastern (EDT))
- ZIP Code: 08302 – Bridgeton; 08352 – Rosenhayn
- Area code: 856
- FIPS code: 3401116900
- GNIS feature ID: 0882054
- Website: www.deerfieldtownship.org

Deerfield Township is a township in Cumberland County, in the U.S. state of New Jersey. It is part of the Vineland--Bridgeton metropolitan statistical area, which encompasses those cities and all of Cumberland County for statistical purposes and which constitutes a part of the Philadelphia metropolitan area. As of the 2020 United States census, the township's population was 3,136, an increase of 17 (+0.5%) from the 2010 census count of 3,119, which in turn reflected an increase of 192 (+6.6%) from the 2,927 counted in the 2000 census.

Deerfield Township was formed as a precinct on January 19, 1748, and was incorporated by an act of the New Jersey Legislature on February 21, 1798, as one of New Jersey's initial group of 104 townships. Portions of the township were taken to form Bridgeton Township (March 3, 1845) and Upper Deerfield Township (February 23, 1922). The township was named for Deerfield, Massachusetts.

== Geography ==
According to the United States Census Bureau, the township had a total area of 16.88 square miles (43.72 km^{2}), including 16.84 square miles (43.62 km^{2}) of land and 0.04 square miles (0.10 km^{2}) of water (0.22%).

Rosenhayn (2020 population of 1,150) is an unincorporated community and census-designated place (CDP) located within Deerfield Township.

Other unincorporated communities, localities and place names located partially or completely within the township include Carmel and Garton.

Deerfield Township borders Fairfield Township, Millville, Upper Deerfield Township and Vineland in Cumberland County; and Pittsgrove Township in Salem County.

== Demographics ==
Historical population
Census	Pop.	Note	%±
1810	1,889		—
1820	1,903		0.7%
1830	2,417		27.0%
1840	2,621		8.4%
1850	927	*	−64.6%
1860	1,288		38.9%
1870	1,518		17.9%
1880	1,643		8.2%
1890	2,614		59.1%
1900	3,066		17.3%
1910	3,311		8.0%
1920	3,153		−4.8%
1930	1,513	*	−52.0%
1940	1,483		−2.0%
1950	1,758		18.5%
1960	2,053		16.8%
1970	2,464		20.0%
1980	2,523		2.4%
1990	2,933		16.3%
2000	2,927		−0.2%
2010	3,119		6.6%
2020	3,136		0.5%
2023 (est.)	3,147		0.4%
Population sources: 1810–2000; 1810–1920 1840 1850–1870; 1850 1870 1880–1890; 1890–1910 1910–1930; 1940–2000 2000; 2010 2020 * = Lost territory in previous decade.

=== 2010 census ===
The 2010 United States census counted 3,119 people, 1,089 households, and 810 families in the township. The population density was 186.1 inhabitants per square mile (71.9/km^{2}). There were 1,143 housing units at an average density of 68.2 per square mile (26.3/km^{2}). The racial makeup was 73.23% (2,284) White, 12.06% (376) Black or African American, 2.12% (66) Native American, 1.35% (42) Asian, 0.00% (0) Pacific Islander, 7.41% (231) from other races, and 3.85% (120) from two or more races. Hispanic or Latino of any race were 14.08% (439) of the population.

Of the 1,089 households, 30.8% had children under the age of 18; 56.6% were married couples living together; 13.3% had a female householder with no husband present and 25.6% were non-families. Of all households, 20.2% were made up of individuals and 9.0% had someone living alone who was 65 years of age or older. The average household size was 2.82 and the average family size was 3.24.

24.6% of the population were under the age of 18, 8.4% from 18 to 24, 23.7% from 25 to 44, 30.1% from 45 to 64, and 13.2% who were 65 years of age or older. The median age was 39.9 years. For every 100 females, the population had 95.2 males. For every 100 females ages 18 and older there were 91.9 males.

The Census Bureau's 2006–2010 American Community Survey showed that (in 2010 inflation-adjusted dollars) median household income was $68,571 (with a margin of error of +/− $6,904) and the median family income was $73,566 (+/− $9,367). Males had a median income of $46,309 (+/− $5,147) versus $31,574 (+/− $6,302) for females. The per capita income for the borough was $26,799 (+/− $3,131). About 3.1% of families and 7.3% of the population were below the poverty line, including 11.6% of those under age 18 and 3.9% of those age 65 or over.

=== 2000 census ===
As of the 2000 United States census there were 2,927 people, 1,013 households, and 785 families residing in the township. The population density was 173.8 inhabitants per square mile (67.1/km^{2}). There were 1,065 housing units at an average density of 63.2 per square mile (24.4/km^{2}). The racial makeup of the township was 78.20% White, 13.05% African American, 1.54% Native American, 1.02% Asian, 3.04% from other races, and 3.14% from two or more races. Hispanic or Latino of any race were 5.94% of the population.

There were 1,013 households, out of which 34.8% had children under the age of 18 living with them, 58.0% were married couples living together, 14.0% had a female householder with no husband present, and 22.5% were non-families. 17.6% of all households were made up of individuals, and 8.2% had someone living alone who was 65 years of age or older. The average household size was 2.86 and the average family size was 3.22.

In the township the population was spread out, with 26.4% under the age of 18, 7.6% from 18 to 24, 27.2% from 25 to 44, 24.8% from 45 to 64, and 14.1% who were 65 years of age or older. The median age was 39 years. For every 100 females, there were 94.9 males. For every 100 females age 18 and over, there were 92.3 males.

The median income for a household in the township was $45,365, and the median income for a family was $47,225. Males had a median income of $34,196 versus $25,147 for females. The per capita income for the township was $18,468. About 6.3% of families and 9.2% of the population were below the poverty line, including 8.3% of those under age 18 and 14.2% of those age 65 or over.

== Government ==
=== Local government ===
Deerfield Township is governed under the Township form of New Jersey municipal government, one of 141 municipalities (of the 564) statewide that use this form, the second-most commonly used form of government in the state. The Township Committee is comprised of five members, who are elected directly by the voters at-large in partisan elections to serve three-year terms of office on a staggered basis, with either one or two seats coming up for election each year as part of the November general election in a three-year cycle. At an annual reorganization meeting held in January, the Township Committee selects one of its members to serve as Mayor and another to serve as Deputy Mayor.

As of 2025, members of the Deerfield Township Committee are Mayor Abigail Perlstein O'Brien (R, term on committee ends December 31, 2027; term as mayor ends December 31, 2025), Deputy Mayor Brian L. Casper (R, term on committee and as deputy mayor ends 2025), Dominick A. Patitucci (R, 2027), Micole C. "Mikki" Sparacio (R, 2025; elected to an unexpired term) and John A. Wolbert Jr. (R, 2027).

After being tied on election day at the November 2014 general election with 362 votes, Democratic incumbent Frank Spatola Jr. was re-elected with 366 votes, edging Republican challenger Jason P. Scythes by three votes once provisional ballots were counted. At the township's January 2015 reorganization meeting, Sparacio was sworn in using a conference call as he was stationed outside the country as part of his service with the Air National Guard.

=== Federal, state and county representation ===
Deerfield Township is located in the 2nd Congressional District and is part of New Jersey's 3rd state legislative district.

For the 119th United States Congress, New Jersey's 2nd congressional district is represented by Jeff Van Drew (R, Dennis Township). New Jersey is represented in the United States Senate by Democrats Cory Booker (Newark, term ends 2027) and Andy Kim (Moorestown, term ends 2031).

For the 2026–2027 session, the 3rd legislative district of the New Jersey Legislature is represented in the State Senate by John Burzichelli (D, Paulsboro) and in the General Assembly by David Bailey (D, Woodstown) and Heather Simmons (D, Glassboro).

Cumberland County is governed by a Board of County Commissioners composed of seven members who are elected at large by the citizens of Cumberland County in partisan elections and serve staggered three-year terms in office, with either two or three seats coming up for election each year in a three-year cycle. Annually, the seven board members select a Director and Deputy Director for one-year terms. As of 2025, members of the Cumberland County Board of County Commissioners (with party affiliation, residence and term-end year listed in parentheses) are:

Douglas A. Albrecht (R, Vineland, 2025), Deputy Director Antonio Romero (R, Vineland, 2027), Sandra Taylor (R, Downe Township; 2026), Victoria Groetsch-Lods (R, Vineland, 2025), Arthur Marchand (R, Hopewell Township, 2026), James Sauro (R, Vineland, 2026) and Robert A. Austino (D, Bridgeton, 2027).

The county's constitutional officers are: Clerk Celeste Riley (D, Bridgeton, 2029), Sheriff Michael Donato (R, Bridgeton, 2026) and Surrogate Rudolph Luisi (R, Vineland, 2028).

=== Politics ===
As of March 2011, there were a total of 2,087 registered voters in Deerfield Township, of which 552 (26.4%) were registered as Democrats, 522 (25.0%) were registered as Republicans and 1,013 (48.5%) were registered as Unaffiliated. There were no voters registered to other parties.

Gubernatorial election results for Deerfield Township
Year	Republican		Democratic		Third party(ies)	
Year	No.	%	No.	%	No.	%
2025	658	58.08%	471	41.57%	4	0.35%
2021	491	65.38%	257	34.22%	3	0.40%
2017	387	48.99%	380	48.10%	23	2.91%
2013	532	65.36%	274	33.66%	8	0.98%
2009	445	47.19%	416	44.11%	82	8.70%
2005	336	41.23%	423	51.90%	56	6.87%

In the 2012 presidential election, Democrat Barack Obama received 53.4% of the vote (698 cast), ahead of Republican Mitt Romney with 45.7% (597 votes), and other candidates with 0.9% (12 votes), among the 1,325 ballots cast by the township's 2,125 registered voters (18 ballots were spoiled), for a turnout of 62.4%. In the 2008 presidential election, Democrat Barack Obama received 52.0% of the vote (744 cast), ahead of Republican John McCain, who received 46.1% (659 votes), with 1,431 ballots cast among the township's 2,066 registered voters, for a turnout of 69.3%. In the 2004 presidential election, Democrat John Kerry received 51.0% of the vote (665 ballots cast), outpolling Republican George W. Bush, who received around 47.5% (619 votes), with 1,303 ballots cast among the township's 1,847 registered voters, for a turnout percentage of 70.5.

United States presidential election results for Deerfield Township 2024 2020 2016 2012 2008 2004
Year	Republican		Democratic		Third party(ies)	
Year	No.	%	No.	%	No.	%
2024	937	61.77%	566	37.31%	14	0.92%
2020	917	57.89%	644	40.66%	23	1.45%
2016	767	57.50%	529	39.66%	38	2.85%
2012	597	45.68%	698	53.40%	12	0.92%
2008	659	46.05%	744	51.99%	28	1.96%
2004	619	47.14%	665	50.65%	29	2.21%

In the 2013 gubernatorial election, Republican Chris Christie received 65.4% of the vote (532 cast), ahead of Democrat Barbara Buono with 33.7% (274 votes), and other candidates with 1.0% (8 votes), among the 831 ballots cast by the township's 2,015 registered voters (17 ballots were spoiled), for a turnout of 41.2%. In the 2009 gubernatorial election, Republican Chris Christie received 45.8% of the vote (445 ballots cast), ahead of both Democrat Jon Corzine with 42.8% (416 votes) and Independent Chris Daggett with 6.9% (67 votes), with 971 ballots cast among the township's 2,070 registered voters, yielding a 46.9% turnout.

United States Senate election results for Deerfield Township1
Year	Republican		Democratic		Third party(ies)	
Year	No.	%	No.	%	No.	%
2024	855	59.54%	545	37.95%	36	2.51%
2018	603	59.00%	392	38.36%	27	2.64%
2012	487	40.86%	668	56.04%	37	3.10%
2006	406	46.77%	434	50.00%	28	3.23%

United States Senate election results for Deerfield Township2
Year	Republican		Democratic		Third party(ies)	
Year	No.	%	No.	%	No.	%
2020	856	56.54%	633	41.81%	25	1.65%
2014	374	51.23%	345	47.26%	11	1.51%
2013	203	57.02%	148	41.57%	5	1.40%
2008	518	41.91%	687	55.58%	31	2.51%

== Education ==
The Deerfield Township School District serves public school students in pre-kindergarten through eighth grade at Deerfield Township School. As of the 2021–22 school year, the district, comprised of one school, had an enrollment of 278 students and 29.2 classroom teachers (on an FTE basis), for a student–teacher ratio of 9.5:1.

Public school students in ninth through twelfth grades attend Cumberland Regional High School, which also serves students from Fairfield Township, Greenwich Township, Hopewell Township, Shiloh Borough, Stow Creek Township and Upper Deerfield Township. As of the 2022–23 school year, the high school had an enrollment of 1,124 students and 82.0 classroom teachers (on an FTE basis), for a student–teacher ratio of 13.7:1. The high school district has a nine-member board of education, with board seats allocated to the constituent municipalities based on population, with each municipality assigned a minimum of one seat; Deerfield Township has one seat on the board.

Cumberland County Technical Education Center is a public countywide school in Millville. Previously it was a part-time school in Deerfield Township. It moved to its current location and became full time in 2016.

== Transportation ==
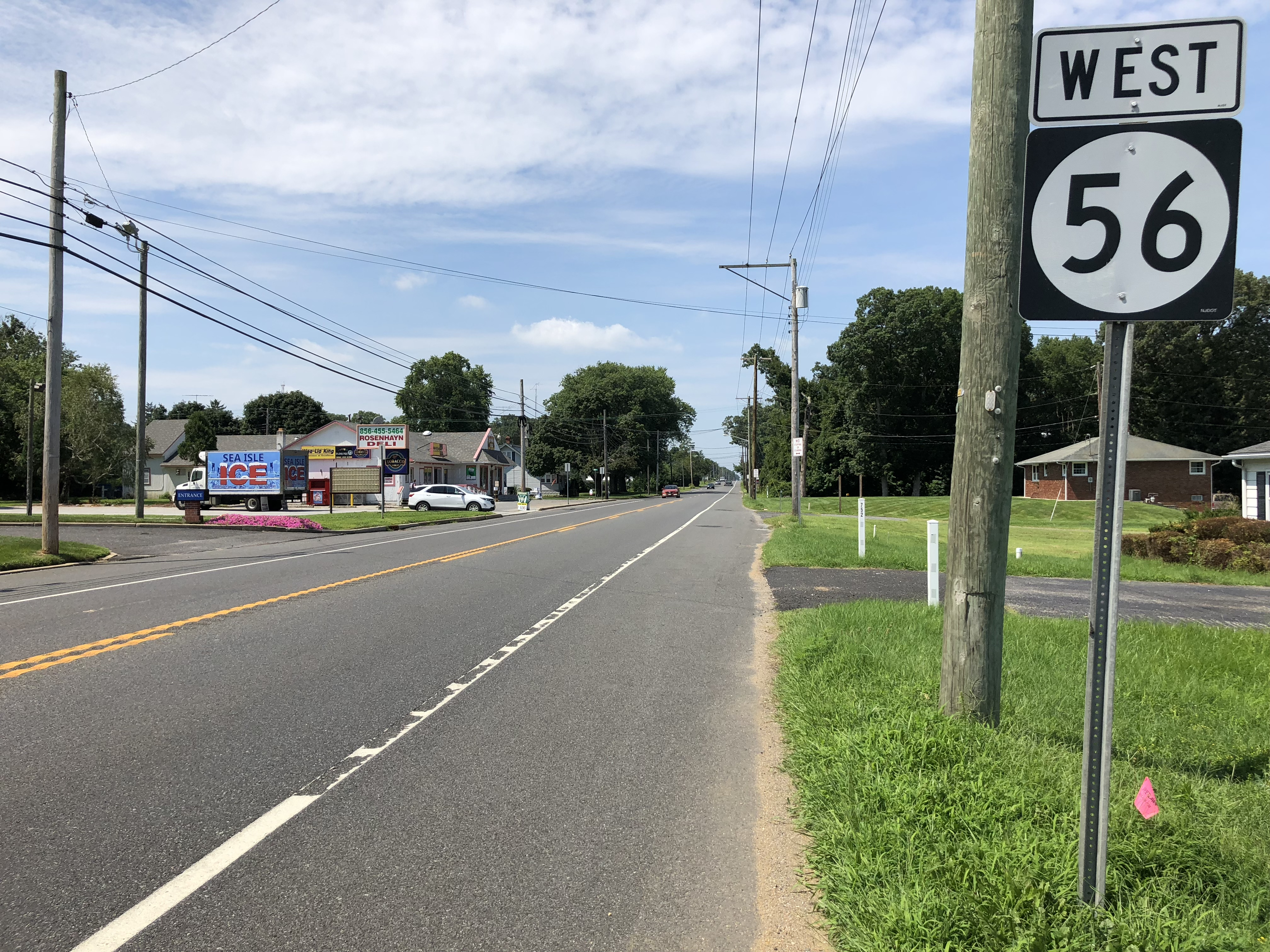
Route 56 westbound in Deerfield Township

As of May 2010, the township had a total of 51.26 miles (82.49 km) of roadways, of which 10.45 miles (16.82 km) were maintained by the municipality, 38.21 miles (61.49 km) by Cumberland County and 2.60 miles (4.18 km) by the New Jersey Department of Transportation.

New Jersey Route 56 is the main highway providing access to Deerfield Township. County Route 552 also traverses the township.

== Points of interest ==
- Temple Beth Hillel Beth Abraham synagogue, formerly Beth Hillel synagogue, a Classical Vernacular synagogue constructed in 1909 and added to the National Register of Historic Places in 1978.
- Southwind Vineyard & Winery

== Notable people ==
People who were born in, residents of, or otherwise closely associated with Deerfield Township include:

- Joseph W. Chinnici (1919–2007), politician who served in the New Jersey General Assembly from the 1st legislative district from 1972 to 1988
- Joseph Bloomfield Leake (1828–1918), attorney and an Iowa state senator who entered the Union Army during the American Civil War
- Frank LoBiondo (born 1946), politician who served as the U.S. representative for New Jersey's 2nd congressional district from 1995 to 2019
- Al McCoy (1894–1966), boxing world middleweight champion from 1914 to 1917
