= FirstPlus Financial Group =

Texas-based mortgage company

- Industry: financial services mortgage
- Headquarters: Texas

FirstPlus Financial Group was a Texas-based mortgage company. In 2011, a number of indictments and other legal actions showed that the firm had been taken over by Lucchese crime family by the use of threats and violence. They were able to remove the firm's entire board of directors and managers, replacing them with their own.

At one point, the company had Vice President Dan Quayle as a members of its (legitimate) board of directors. American football player Dan Marino once served as its TV spokesman.

According to the company, in June 2007 the gangsters forced the firm to purchase several firms under very unfavorable terms. They may have looted $12 million from shareholders.

On June 24, 2011, the firm filed for bankruptcy protection under Chapter 11.

In 2014, mobsters William and James Maxwell were convicted for organizing crime, among other charges, having been accused of racketeering fraud and bribery for their involvement in unlawfully taking over FirstPlus Financial Group and using its money to buy luxury cars and a yacht.

== See also ==
- Nicky Scarfo Jr.
