= Fairfield Township School District =

School district in Cumberland County, New Jersey, US

Address
- 375 Gouldtown-Woodruff Road Fairfield Township, Cumberland County, New Jersey, 08302; United States
- Coordinates: 39.423463°N 75.183272°W

District information
- Grades: PreK-8
- Superintendent: Ja'Shanna Jones-Booker
- Business administrator: Sean McCarron
- Schools: 1

Students and staff
- Enrollment: 510 (as of 2022–23)
- Faculty: 35.0 FTEs
- Student–teacher ratio: 14.6:1

Other information
- District Factor Group: A
- Website: fairfield.k12.nj.us
Ind.	Per pupil	District spending	Rank (*)	K-8 average	%± vs. average
1A	Total Spending	$21,789	55	$18,891	15.3%
1	Budgetary Cost	11,810	9	14,159	−16.6%
2	Classroom Instruction	7,831	18	8,659	−9.6%
6	Support Services	1,522	10	2,167	−29.8%
8	Administrative Cost	1,392	10	1,547	−10.0%
10	Operations & Maintenance	989	5	1,612	−38.6%
13	Extracurricular Activities	72	17	104	−30.8%
16	Median Teacher Salary	52,359	6	61,136
Data from NJDoE 2014 Taxpayers' Guide to Education Spending. *Of K-8 districts with 401-750 students. Lowest spending=1; Highest=64

The Fairfield Township School District serves students in pre-kindergarten through eighth grade from Fairfield Township, in Cumberland County, in the U.S. state of New Jersey. The school has a Bridgeton mailing address.

As of the 2022–23 school year, the district, comprised of one school, had an enrollment of 510 students and 35.0 classroom teachers (on an FTE basis), for a student–teacher ratio of 14.6:1.

The district is classified by the New Jersey Department of Education as being in District Factor Group "A", the lowest of eight groupings. District Factor Groups organize districts statewide to allow comparison by common socioeconomic characteristics of the local districts. From lowest socioeconomic status to highest, the categories are A, B, CD, DE, FG, GH, I and J.

Public school students in ninth through twelfth grades attend Cumberland Regional High School, which also serves students from Deerfield Township, Greenwich Township, Hopewell Township, Shiloh Borough, Stow Creek Township and Upper Deerfield Township. As of the 2022–23 school year, the high school had an enrollment of 1,124 students and 82.0 classroom teachers (on an FTE basis), for a student–teacher ratio of 13.7:1.

== Schools ==
Fairfield Township School opened in September 2006, replacing two antiquated facilities and consolidated all grades into one building located at 375 Gouldtown-Woodruff Road in the Gouldtown section of the township. The school had an enrollment of 552 students in pre-kindergarten through eighth grade as of the 2019-20 school year.

- Ja’Shanna Jones–Booker, Principal

== Administration ==
Core members of the district's administration are:

- Ja'Shanna Jones-Booker, superintendent
- Sean McCarron, business administrator and board secretary

== Board of education ==
The district's board of education is comprised of nine members who set policy and oversee the fiscal and educational operation of the district through its administration. As a Type II school district, the board's trustees are elected directly by voters to serve three-year terms of office on a staggered basis, with three seats up for election each year held (since 2012) as part of the November general election. The board appoints a superintendent to oversee the district's day-to-day operations and a business administrator to supervise the business functions of the district.
