= Fairfield Township, Cumberland County, New Jersey =

Township in Cumberland County, New Jersey, US

Fairfield Township, New Jersey
- Township
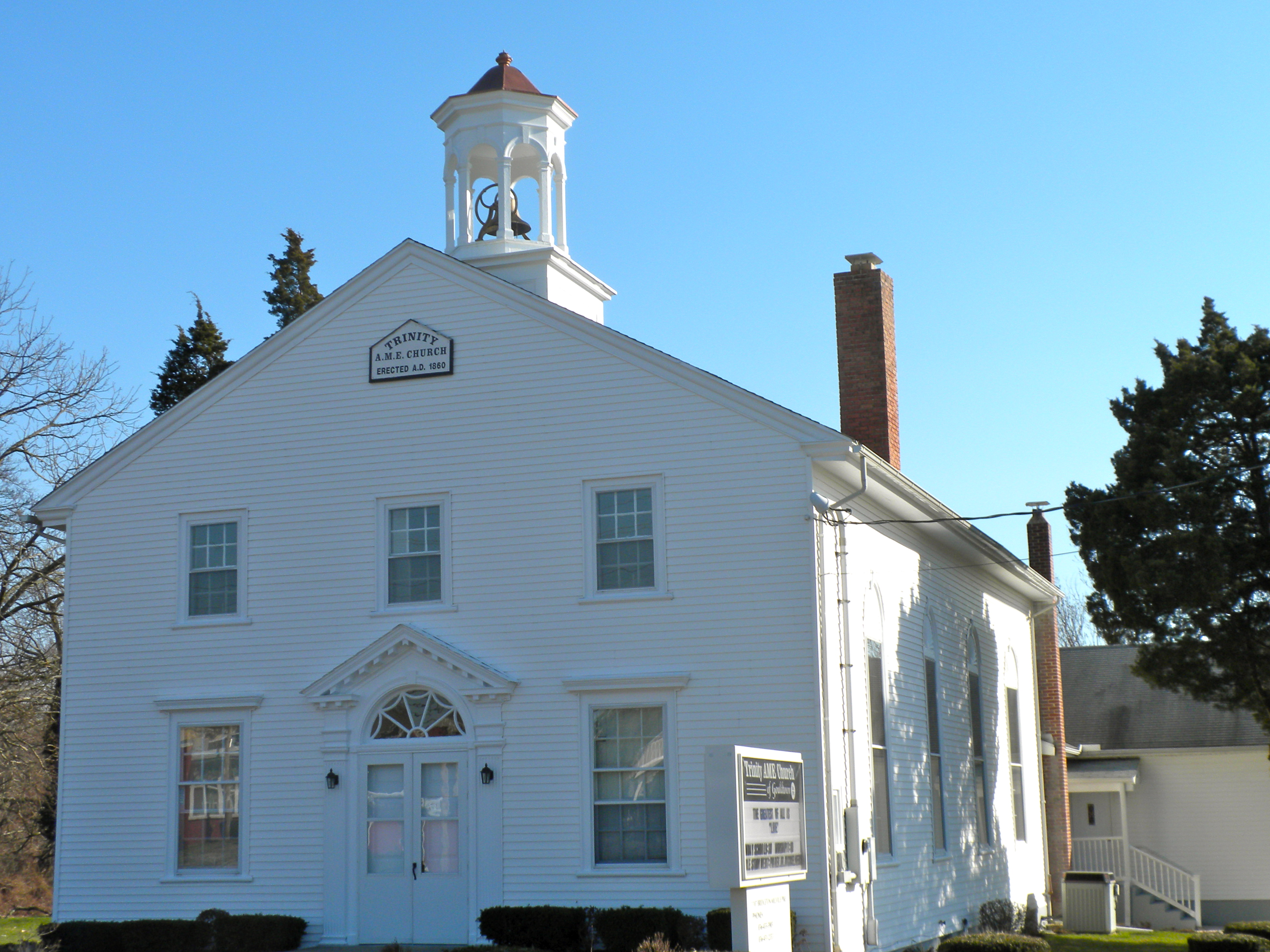
- Trinity African Methodist Episcopal Church

- Seal

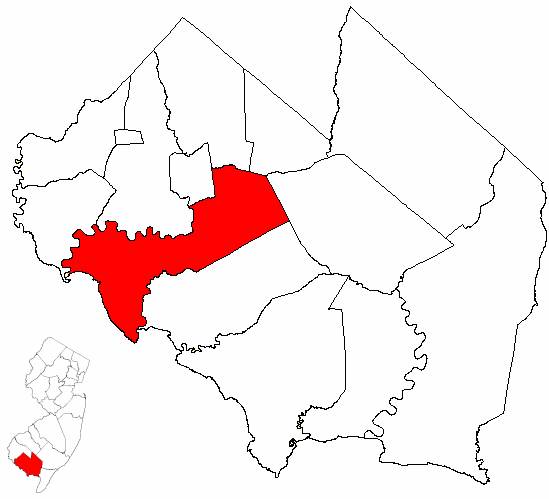
- Location of Fairfield Township in Cumberland County highlighted in red (right). Inset map: Location of Cumberland County in New Jersey highlighted in red (left).

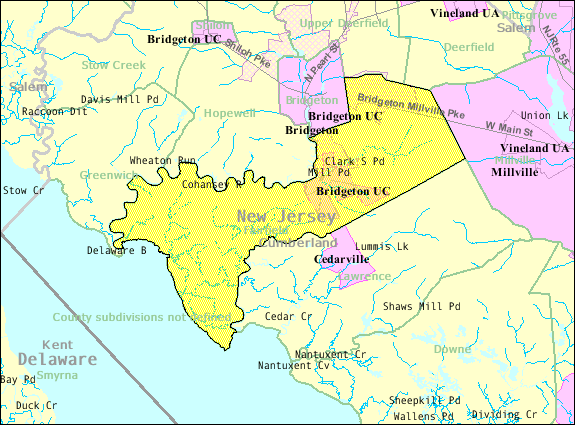
- Census Bureau map of Fairfield Township, Cumberland County, New Jersey

- Location in Cumberland County Location in New Jersey Location in the United States
- Coordinates: 39.372316°N 75.238721°W
- Country: United States
- State: New Jersey
- County: Cumberland
- Formed: May 12, 1697
- Incorporated: February 21, 1798
- Named for: Fairfield, Connecticut

Government
  - Type: Township
  - Body: Township committee
  - Mayor: Marvin Pierce Jr. (D, term ends December 31, 2025)
  - Administrator: Mike Burden
  - Municipal clerk: Linda M. Gonzales

Area
  - Total: 43.82 sq mi (113.50 km^{2})
  - Land: 41.12 sq mi (106.50 km^{2})
  - Water: 2.70 sq mi (7.00 km^{2}) 6.17%
  - Rank: 45th of 565 in state 5th of 14 in county
- Elevation: 16 ft (4.9 m)

Population (2020)
  - Total: 5,546
  - Estimate (2023): 5,340
  - Rank: 363rd of 565 in state 6th of 14 in county
  - Density: 134.9/sq mi (52.1/km^{2})
  - Rank: 528th of 565 in state 9th of 14 in county
- Time zone: UTC−05:00 (Eastern (EST))
  - Summer (DST): UTC−04:00 (Eastern (EDT))
- ZIP Code: 08320 – Fairton
- Area code: 856 exchange: 575
- FIPS code: 3401122350
- GNIS feature ID: 0882059
- Website: www.fairfieldtownshipnj.org

Fairfield Township is a township in Cumberland County, in the U.S. state of New Jersey. It is part of the Vineland-Bridgeton metropolitan statistical area, which encompasses all of Cumberland County for statistical purposes and which constitutes a part of the Philadelphia metropolitan area. As of the 2020 United States census, the township's population was 5,546, a decrease of 749 (−11.9%) from the 2010 census count of 6,295, which in turn reflected an increase of 12 (+0.2%) from the 6,283 counted in the 2000 census.

Fairfield Township was formed by royal charter on May 12, 1697, from portions of the Cohansey Township area, while still part of Salem County, and was formed as a precinct in the newly created Cumberland County on January 19, 1748. It was incorporated on February 21, 1798, as one of the initial group of 104 townships in the state by an act of the New Jersey Legislature. Portions of the township were taken to form Downe Township (September 26, 1772), Millville Township (February 24, 1801) and Lawrence Township (February 17, 1885).

The name Fairfield refers to its original settlers, who were émigrés from Fairfield, Connecticut who settled in the area in 1697. The oldest Presbyterian church in South Jersey is said to date to June 1697. There is a plaque and an old cemetery which indicates the original log building. When it was first created as one of Cumberland County's original six townships, it included land that would later become Commercial Township, Downe Township, Lawrence Township and Millville.

== Geography ==
According to the U.S. Census Bureau, the township had a total area of 43.82 square miles (113.50 km^{2}), including 41.12 square miles (106.50 km^{2}) of land and 2.70 square miles (7.00 km^{2}) of water (6.17%).

Fairton (with a 2020 census population of 1,060) and Gouldtown (1,601) are unincorporated communities and census-designated places (CDPs) located within Fairfield Township.

Other unincorporated communities, localities and place names located partially or completely within the township include Back Neck, Ben Davis Point, Clarks Pond, Fordville, Lanings Wharf, Mulfords Landing, New England Crossroads, Sea Breeze and Tindells Landing.

The township has three primary population centers: Sea Breeze, Fairton (originally named Bumbridge) and Gouldtown, an old African American community from the segregation period.

Fairfield Township borders the Cumberland County municipalities of Bridgeton, Deerfield Township, Greenwich Township, Hopewell Township, Lawrence Township, Millville and Upper Deerfield Township, along with the Delaware Bay.

== Demographics ==
Historical population
Census	Pop.	Note	%±
1810	2,279	*	—
1820	1,869		−18.0%
1830	1,812		−3.0%
1840	1,935		6.8%
1850	2,133		10.2%
1860	2,448		14.8%
1870	3,011		23.0%
1880	3,215		6.8%
1890	1,688	*	−47.5%
1900	1,911		13.2%
1910	1,629		−14.8%
1920	1,514		−7.1%
1930	1,848		22.1%
1940	1,977		7.0%
1950	2,932		48.3%
1960	3,916		33.6%
1970	4,990		27.4%
1980	5,693		14.1%
1990	5,699		0.1%
2000	6,283		10.2%
2010	6,295		0.2%
2020	5,546		−11.9%
2023 (est.)	5,340		−3.7%
Population sources: 1810–2000; 1810–1920 1840 1850–1870; 1850 1870 1880–1890; 1890–1910 1910–1930; 1940–2000 2000; 2010 2020 * = Lost territory in previous decade

=== 2010 census ===
The 2010 United States census counted 6,295 people, 1,882 households, and 1,357 families in the township. The population density was 152.6 inhabitants per square mile (58.9/km^{2}). There were 2,058 housing units at an average density of 49.9 per square mile (19.3/km^{2}). The racial makeup was 37.49% (2,360) White, 47.53% (2,992) Black or African American, 5.10% (321) Native American, 0.44% (28) Asian, 0.03% (2) Pacific Islander, 4.58% (288) from other races, and 4.83% (304) from two or more races. Hispanic or Latino people of any race were 12.84% (808) of the population.

Of the 1,882 households, 24.6% had children under the age of 18; 43.6% were married couples living together; 21.3% had a female householder with no husband present and 27.9% were non-families. Of all households, 24.1% were made up of individuals and 9.9% had someone living alone who was 65 years of age or older. The average household size was 2.67 and the average family size was 3.14.

17.8% of the population were under the age of 18, 9.2% from 18 to 24, 32.5% from 25 to 44, 27.3% from 45 to 64, and 13.2% who were 65 years of age or older. The median age was 39.0 years. For every 100 females, the population had 139.4 males. For every 100 females ages 18 and older there were 148.8 males.

Fairfield Township had the highest percentage of Native Americans in any municipality in New Jersey, at 5.10% in the 2010 census.

The Census Bureau's 2006–2010 American Community Survey showed that (in 2010 inflation-adjusted dollars) median household income was $46,895 (with a margin of error of +/− $3,014) and the median family income was $55,286 (+/− $4,900). Males had a median income of $45,333 (+/− $4,287) versus $32,763 (+/− $2,703) for females. The per capita income for the borough was $20,619 (+/− $1,444). About 6.7% of families and 10.3% of the population were below the poverty line, including 17.1% of those under age 18 and 4.3% of those age 65 or over.

=== 2000 census ===
As of the 2000 census, there were 6,283 people, 1,751 households, and 1,322 families residing in the township. The population density was 148.6 inhabitants per square mile (57.4/km^{2}). There were 1,915 housing units at an average density of 45.3 per square mile (17.5/km^{2}). The racial makeup of the township was 41.41% White, 47.43% African American, 5.08% Native American, 0.56% Asian, 0.03% Pacific Islander, 2.39% from other races, and 3.10% from two or more races. Hispanic or Latino people of any race were 8.87% of the population.

There were 1,751 households, out of which 28.2% had children under the age of 18 living with them, 50.7% were married couples living together, 18.5% had a female householder with no husband present, and 24.5% were non-families. 20.4% of all households were made up of individuals, and 8.1% had someone living alone who was 65 years of age or older. The average household size was 2.78 and the average family size was 3.19.

In the township the population was spread out, with 19.8% under the age of 18, 8.8% from 18 to 24, 36.4% from 25 to 44, 24.3% from 45 to 64, and 10.7% who were 65 years of age or older. The median age was 37 years. For every 100 females, there were 146.7 males. For every 100 females age 18 and over, there were 161.7 males.

The median income for a household in the township was $37,891, and the median income for a family was $41,326. Males had a median income of $31,858 versus $23,931 for females. The per capita income for the township was $17,547. About 6.9% of families and 11.2% of the population were below the poverty line, including 14.9% of those under age 18 and 7.8% of those age 65 or over.

== Government ==
=== Local government ===
Fairfield Township is governed under the township form of New Jersey municipal government, one of 141 municipalities (of the 564) statewide that use this form, the second-most commonly used form of government in the state. The township committee is comprised of five members, who are elected directly by the voters at-large in partisan elections to serve three-year terms of office on a staggered basis, with either one or two seats coming up for election each year as part of the November general election in a three-year cycle. At an annual reorganization meeting, the committee selects one of its members to serve as mayor and another as deputy mayor, each serving a one-year term.

As of 2025, members of the Fairfield Township Committee are Mayor Marvin Pierce (D, term on committee ends December 31, 2026; term as mayor ends 2025), Deputy Mayor Michael L. Peterson (D, term on committee ends 2027; term as deputy mayor ends 2025), Stephen M. Bateman (D, 2027), Julia Burrus (D, 2026) and Benjamin Byrd Sr. (D, 2025).

JoAnne Servais was appointed to serve the unexpired term, ending December 2014, of Dennis Pierce, who had resigned from office in June 2012, citing health issues.

=== Federal, state, and county representation ===
Fairfield Township is located in the 2nd Congressional District and is part of New Jersey's 1st state legislative district.

For the 119th United States Congress, New Jersey's 2nd congressional district is represented by Jeff Van Drew (R, Dennis Township). New Jersey is represented in the United States Senate by Democrats Cory Booker (Newark, term ends 2027) and Andy Kim (Moorestown, term ends 2031).

For the 2026–2027 session, the 1st legislative district of the New Jersey Legislature is represented in the State Senate by Mike Testa (R, Vineland) and in the General Assembly by Antwan McClellan (R, Ocean City) and Erik K. Simonsen (R, Lower Township).

Cumberland County is governed by a Board of County Commissioners composed of seven members who are elected at large by the citizens of Cumberland County in partisan elections and serve staggered three-year terms in office, with either two or three seats coming up for election each year in a three-year cycle. Annually, the seven board members select a Director and Deputy Director for one-year terms. As of 2025, members of the Cumberland County Board of County Commissioners (with party affiliation, residence and term-end year listed in parentheses) are:

Douglas A. Albrecht (R, Vineland, 2025), Deputy Director Antonio Romero (R, Vineland, 2027), Sandra Taylor (R, Downe Township; 2026), Victoria Groetsch-Lods (R, Vineland, 2025), Arthur Marchand (R, Hopewell Township, 2026), James Sauro (R, Vineland, 2026) and Robert A. Austino (D, Bridgeton, 2027).

The county's constitutional officers are: Clerk Celeste Riley (D, Bridgeton, 2029), Sheriff Michael Donato (R, Bridgeton, 2026) and Surrogate Rudolph Luisi (R, Vineland, 2028).

=== Politics ===
As of March 2011, there were a total of 3,639 registered voters in Fairfield Township, of which 1,603 (44.1%) were registered as Democrats, 409 (11.2%) were registered as Republicans and 1,627 (44.7%) were registered as Unaffiliated. There were no voters registered to other parties.

Gubernatorial election results for Fairfield Township
Year	Republican		Democratic		Third party(ies)	
Year	No.	%	No.	%	No.	%
2025	478	31.95%	1,002	66.98%	16	1.07%
2021	448	36.84%	761	62.58%	7	0.58%
2017	306	27.69%	769	69.59%	30	2.71%
2013	472	37.22%	774	61.04%	22	1.74%
2009	387	28.00%	925	66.93%	70	5.07%
2005	373	27.79%	918	68.41%	51	3.80%

In the 2012 presidential election, Democrat Barack Obama received 76.9% of the vote (1,830 cast), ahead of Republican Mitt Romney with 22.4% (534 votes), and other candidates with 0.6% (15 votes), among the 2,405 ballots cast by the township's 3,739 registered voters (26 ballots were spoiled), for a turnout of 64.3%. In the 2008 presidential election, Democrat Barack Obama received 75.9% of the vote (1,860 cast), ahead of Republican John McCain, who received 22.3% (547 votes), with 2,451 ballots cast among the township's 3,707 registered voters, for a turnout of 66.1%. In the 2004 presidential election, Democrat John Kerry received 68.7% of the vote (1,476 ballots cast), outpolling Republican George W. Bush, who received around 29.6% (636 votes), with 2,149 ballots cast among the township's 3,400 registered voters, for a turnout percentage of 63.2.

United States presidential election results for Fairfield Township 2024 2020 2016 2012 2008 2004
Year	Republican		Democratic		Third party(ies)	
Year	No.	%	No.	%	No.	%
2024	696	34.73%	1,294	64.57%	14	0.70%
2020	721	30.56%	1,621	68.72%	17	0.72%
2016	604	28.42%	1,462	68.80%	59	2.78%
2012	534	22.45%	1,830	76.92%	15	0.63%
2008	547	22.32%	1,860	75.89%	44	1.80%
2004	636	29.60%	1,476	68.68%	37	1.72%

In the 2013 gubernatorial election, Democrat Barbara Buono received 61.0% of the vote (774 cast), ahead of Republican Chris Christie with 37.2% (472 votes), and other candidates with 1.7% (22 votes), among the 1,315 ballots cast by the township's 3,584 registered voters (47 ballots were spoiled), for a turnout of 36.7%. In the 2009 gubernatorial election, Democrat Jon Corzine received 65.% of the vote (925 ballots cast), ahead of both Republican Chris Christie with 27.2% (387 votes) and Independent Chris Daggett with 3.9% (56 votes), with 1,424 ballots cast among the township's 3,586 registered voters, yielding a 39.7% turnout.

United States Senate election results for Fairfield Township1
Year	Republican		Democratic		Third party(ies)	
Year	No.	%	No.	%	No.	%
2024	611	32.53%	1,206	64.22%	61	3.25%
2018	475	30.35%	1,034	66.07%	56	3.58%
2012	448	21.95%	1,546	75.75%	47	2.30%
2006	379	32.20%	765	65.00%	33	2.80%

United States Senate election results for Fairfield Township2
Year	Republican		Democratic		Third party(ies)	
Year	No.	%	No.	%	No.	%
2020	652	28.21%	1,611	69.71%	48	2.08%
2014	343	27.75%	876	70.87%	17	1.38%
2013	196	25.42%	570	73.93%	5	0.65%
2008	475	22.74%	1,559	74.63%	55	2.63%

=== Corrections ===
Federal Correctional Institution, Fairton is in the township. As of April 202, the prison and the adjoining camp had a total population of more than 1,100 inmates.

== Education ==
The Fairfield Township School District serves public school students in pre-kindergarten through eighth grade. As of the 2022–23 school year, the district, comprised of one school, had an enrollment of 510 students and 35.0 classroom teachers (on an FTE basis), for a student–teacher ratio of 14.6:1. The district opened the new Fairfield Township School in September 2006, consolidating all grades into a single building located at 375 Gouldtown-Woodruff Road in the Gouldtown section of the township.

Public school students in ninth through twelfth grades attend Cumberland Regional High School, which also serves students from Deerfield Township, Greenwich Township, Hopewell Township, Shiloh Borough, Stow Creek Township and Upper Deerfield Township. As of the 2022–23 school year, the high school had an enrollment of 1,124 students and 82.0 classroom teachers (on an FTE basis), for a student–teacher ratio of 13.7:1. The high school district has a nine-member board of education, with board seats allocated to the constituent municipalities based on population; Fairfield Township has two seats on the board.

Students are also eligible to attend Cumberland County Technical Education Center in Vineland, serving students from the entire county in its full-time technical training programs, which are offered without charge to students who are county residents.

== Transportation ==
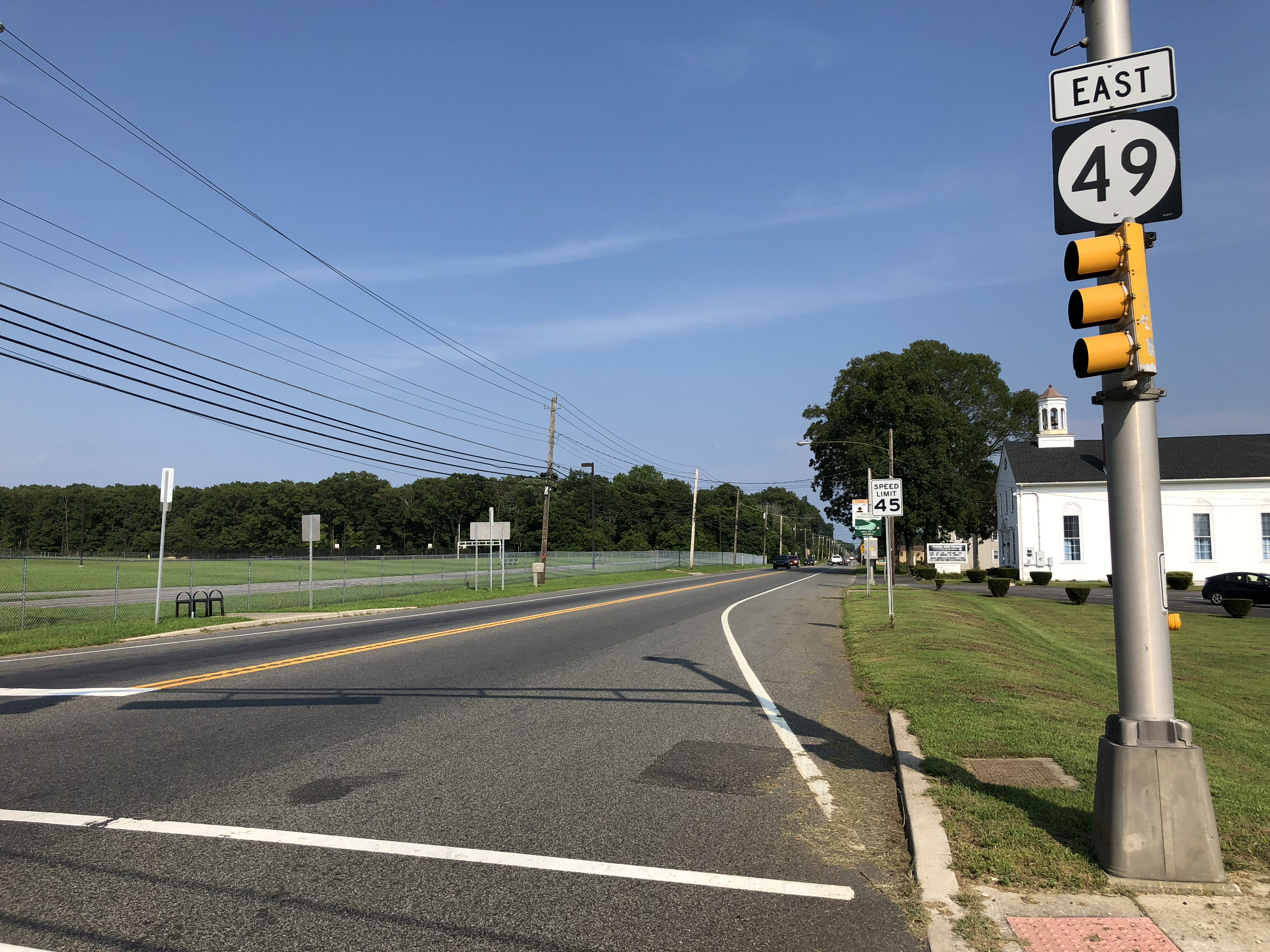
Route 49 eastbound at County Route 553 in Fairfield Township

=== Roads and highways ===
As of May 2010, the township had a total of 74.45 miles (119.82 km) of roadways, of which 30.89 miles (49.71 km) were maintained by the municipality, 39.90 miles (64.21 km) by Cumberland County and 3.66 miles (5.89 km) by the New Jersey Department of Transportation.

Route 49 is the main highway serving Fairfield Township. County Route 553 also traverses the township.

=== Public transportation ===
NJ Transit offers service on the 553 route between Upper Deerfield Township and Atlantic City.

== Notable people ==
People who were born in, residents of, or otherwise closely associated with Fairfield Township include:

- Nathaniel Clark Burt (1825–1874), Presbyterian clergyman
- Harold Gould (1924–2012), baseball pitcher with the Philadelphia Stars in the Negro leagues from 1947 to 1948
- John T. Nixon (1820–1889), represented New Jersey's 1st congressional district in the United States House of Representatives from 1859 to 1863
- Theophilus Gould Steward (1843–1924), author, educator and clergyman, who was a U.S. Army chaplain and Buffalo Soldier of 25th U.S. Colored Infantry
