= Lakeside-Beebe Run, New Jersey =

Populated place in Cumberland County, New Jersey, US

- Census-designated place
- Location in Cumberland County Location in New Jersey Location in the United States
- Coordinates: 39°27′8″N 75°14′56″W
- Country: United States
- State: New Jersey
- County: Cumberland
- Township: Hopewell

Area
  - Total: 0.28 sq mi (0.72 km^{2})
  - Land: 0.28 sq mi (0.72 km^{2})
  - Water: 0 sq mi (0.00 km^{2})
- Elevation: 67 ft (20 m)

Population (2020)
  - Total: 403
  - Density: 1,443.3/sq mi (557.26/km^{2})
- Time zone: UTC−05:00 (Eastern (EST))
  - Summer (DST): UTC−04:00 (EDT)
- ZIP Code: 08302 (Bridgeton)
- Area code: 856
- FIPS code: 34-38296
- GNIS feature ID: 2806110

Lakeside-Beebe Run is a census-designated place (CDP) in Hopewell Township, in Cumberland County, in the U.S. state of New Jersey. It is in the northern part of the county, on the eastern side of the township, on high ground overlooking Sunset Lake to the east and Mary Elmer Lake to the south. It is bordered to the south by the city of Bridgeton, the county seat.

As of the 2020 census, Lakeside-Beebe Run had a population of 403.

Lakeside-Beebe Run was first listed as a CDP prior to the 2020 census.

== Demographics ==
Historical population
Census	Pop.	Note	%±
2020	403		—
U.S. Decennial Census; 2020

Lakeside-Beebe Run first appeared as a census designated place in the 2020 U.S. census.

Lakeside-Beebe Run CDP, New Jersey – Racial and ethnic composition Note: the US Census treats Hispanic/Latino as an ethnic category. This table excludes Latinos from the racial categories and assigns them to a separate category. Hispanics/Latinos may be of any race.
Race / Ethnicity (NH = Non-Hispanic)	Pop 2020	2020
White alone (NH)	273	67.74%
Black or African American alone (NH)	25	6.20%
Native American or Alaska Native alone (NH)	9	2.23%
Asian alone (NH)	7	1.74%
Native Hawaiian or Pacific Islander alone (NH)	0	0.00%
Other race alone (NH)	0	0.00%
Mixed race or Multiracial (NH)	13	3.23%
Hispanic or Latino (any race)	76	18.86%
Total	403	100.00%

As of 2020, the population was 403.

== Education ==
Students are zoned to Hopewell Township School District (for elementary school) and Cumberland Regional School District (for high school).
