= Cohansey =

Cohansey may refer to:

- Cohansey Township, New Jersey, a former township
- Cohansey, New Jersey, an unincorporated community
- Cohansey River, a river in New Jersey
