= Hopewell Township, Cumberland County, New Jersey =

Township in the United States

Hopewell Township, New Jersey
- Township
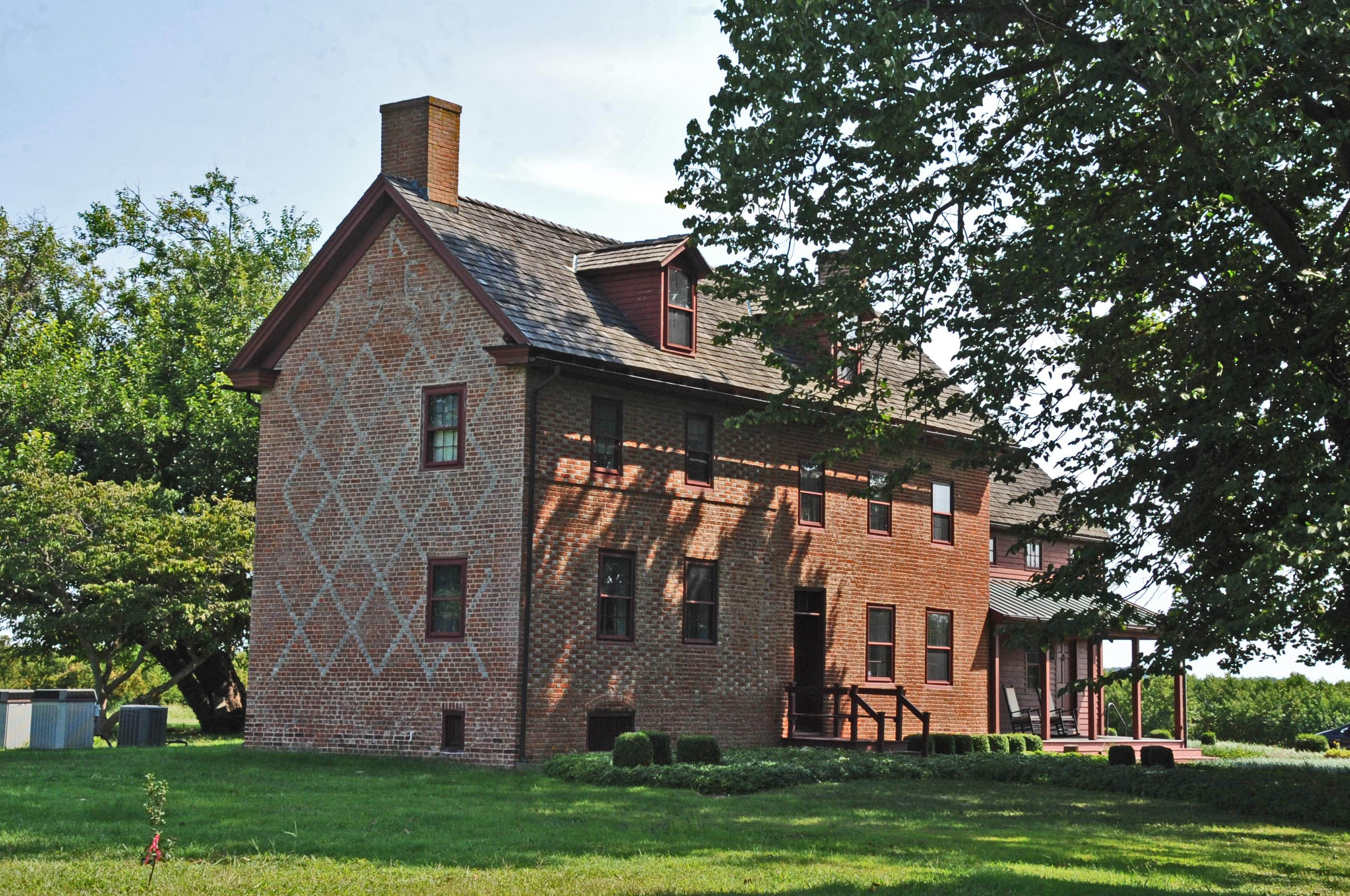
- John and Elizabeth Remington House

- Seal

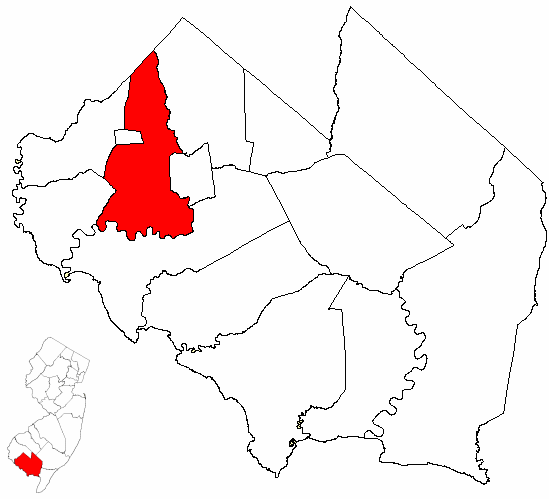
- Location of Hopewell Township in Cumberland County highlighted in red (right). Inset map: Location of Cumberland County in New Jersey highlighted in red (left).

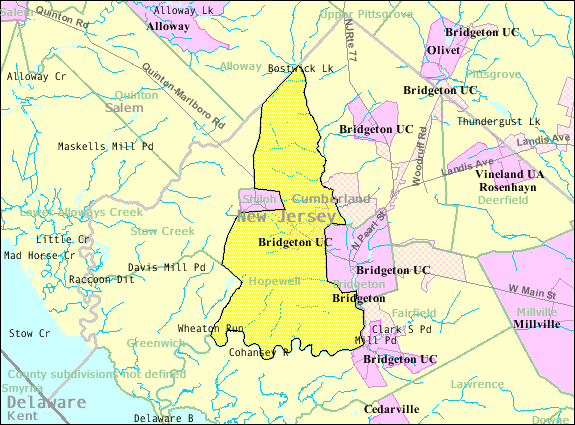
- Census Bureau map of Hopewell Township, Cumberland County, New Jersey

- Location in Cumberland County Location in New Jersey Location in the United States
- Coordinates: 39.438376°N 75.281996°W
- Country: United States
- State: New Jersey
- County: Cumberland
- Formed: January 19, 1748
- Incorporated: February 21, 1798

Government
  - Type: Township
  - Body: Township Committee
  - Mayor: Roberta S. "Robin" Freitag (R, term ends December 31, 2025)
  - Administrator: George Snyder
  - Municipal Clerk: Rosa Brambila (acting)

Area
  - Total: 30.87 sq mi (79.96 km^{2})
  - Land: 29.89 sq mi (77.42 km^{2})
  - Water: 0.98 sq mi (2.54 km^{2}) 3.18%
  - Rank: 86th of 565 in state 9th of 14 in county
- Elevation: 72 ft (22 m)

Population (2020)
  - Total: 4,391
  - Estimate (2023): 4,353
  - Rank: 401st of 565 in state 8th of 14 in county
  - Density: 146.9/sq mi (56.7/km^{2})
  - Rank: 521st of 565 in state 7th of 14 in county
- Time zone: UTC−05:00 (Eastern (EST))
  - Summer (DST): UTC−04:00 (Eastern (EDT))
- ZIP Code: 08302 – Bridgeton
- Area code: 856
- FIPS code: 3401133120
- GNIS feature ID: 0882056
- Website: www.hopewelltwp-nj.com

Hopewell Township is marked yellow on the 1862 map of Cumberland County

Hopewell Township is a township in Cumberland County, in the U.S. state of New Jersey. It is part of the Vineland-Bridgeton metropolitan statistical area, which encompasses those cities and all of Cumberland County for statistical purposes and which constitutes a part of the Philadelphia metropolitan area. As of the 2020 United States census, the township's population was 4,391, a decrease of 180 (−3.9%) from the 2010 census count of 4,571, which in turn reflected an increase of 137 (+3.1%) from the 4,434 counted in the 2000 census.

Hopewell Township was first formed as a precinct on January 19, 1748, and was incorporated by an act of the New Jersey Legislature on February 21, 1798, as one of New Jersey's initial group of 104 townships. Portions of the township have been taken to form Columbia Township (March 12, 1844, returned to Hopewell Township on March 11, 1845), Cohansey Township (March 6, 1848) and Shiloh borough (April 9, 1929).

== Geography ==
According to the United States Census Bureau, the township had a total area of 30.87 square miles (79.96 km^{2}), including 29.89 square miles (77.42 km^{2}) of land and 0.98 square miles (2.54 km^{2}) of water (3.18%).

Unincorporated communities, localities and place names located partially or completely within the township include Bowentown, Cohansey, Dutch Neck, Harmony, Irlands Mills, Lakeside-Beebe Run, Mary Elmer Lake, Roadstown, Sheppards Mill, and West Park.

The township borders the municipalities of Bridgeton, Fairfield Township, Greenwich Township, Shiloh, Stow Creek Township and Upper Deerfield Township in Cumberland County; and Alloway Township in Salem County.

Mary Elmer Lake is a reservoir on the Cohansey River in Hopewell Township and Bridgeton that covers 22.2 acres (9.0 ha) and is used for water-supply and recreation purposes. Sunset Lake is a reservoir in Hopewell Township and Upper Deerfield Township covering 87.0 acres (35.2 ha) that was created by damming a stream that feeds to the area from above Seeley Lake and a stream that feeds into the lake from nearby Mary Elmer Lake.

== Demographics ==
Historical population
Census	Pop.	Note	%±
1810	1,987		—
1820	1,952		−1.8%
1830	1,953		0.1%
1840	2,220		13.7%
1850	1,480	*	−33.3%
1860	1,757		18.7%
1870	1,857		5.7%
1880	1,764		−5.0%
1890	1,743		−1.2%
1900	1,807		3.7%
1910	1,818		0.6%
1920	1,844		1.4%
1930	1,764	*	−4.3%
1940	2,048		16.1%
1950	2,460		20.1%
1960	3,586		45.8%
1970	3,970		10.7%
1980	4,365		9.9%
1990	4,215		−3.4%
2000	4,434		5.2%
2010	4,571		3.1%
2020	4,391		−3.9%
2023 (est.)	4,353		−0.9%
Population sources: 1810–2010; 1810–1920 1840 1850–1870; 1850 1870 1880–1890; 1890–1910 1910–1930; 1940–2000 2000; 2010 2020 * = Lost territory in previous decade

=== 2010 census ===
The 2010 United States census counted 4,571 people, 1,662 households, and 1,200 families in the township. The population density was 153.0 inhabitants per square mile (59.1/km^{2}). There were 1,741 housing units at an average density of 58.3 per square mile (22.5/km^{2}). The racial makeup was 84.38% (3,857) White, 6.58% (301) Black or African American, 2.17% (99) Native American, 0.57% (26) Asian, 0.00% (0) Pacific Islander, 3.24% (148) from other races, and 3.06% (140) from two or more races. Hispanic or Latino of any race were 7.33% (335) of the population.

Of the 1,662 households, 27.4% had children under the age of 18; 56.3% were married couples living together; 10.8% had a female householder with no husband present and 27.8% were non-families. Of all households, 24.2% were made up of individuals and 14.2% had someone living alone who was 65 years of age or older. The average household size was 2.59 and the average family size was 3.07.

20.7% of the population were under the age of 18, 8.4% from 18 to 24, 21.6% from 25 to 44, 28.6% from 45 to 64, and 20.7% who were 65 years of age or older. The median age was 44.5 years. For every 100 females, the population had 91.9 males. For every 100 females ages 18 and older there were 88.6 males.

The Census Bureau's 2006–2010 American Community Survey showed that (in 2010 inflation-adjusted dollars) median household income was $63,059 (with a margin of error of +/− $7,372) and the median family income was $72,520 (+/− $6,301). Males had a median income of $44,688 (+/− $5,244) versus $46,793 (+/− $8,187) for females. The per capita income for the borough was $27,355 (+/− $2,361). About 0.9% of families and 3.3% of the population were below the poverty line, including 2.7% of those under age 18 and 5.1% of those age 65 or over.

=== 2000 census ===
As of the 2000 United States census there were 4,434 people, 1,628 households, and 1,206 families residing in the township. The population density was 148.3 inhabitants per square mile (57.3/km^{2}). There were 1,683 housing units at an average density of 56.3 per square mile (21.7/km^{2}). The racial makeup of the township was 87.10% White, 6.90% African American, 2.32% Native American, 0.56% Asian, 0.02% Pacific Islander, 1.44% from other races, and 1.65% from two or more races. Hispanic or Latino of any race were 3.59% of the population.

There were 1,628 households, out of which 30.2% had children under the age of 18 living with them, 60.6% were married couples living together, 9.2% had a female householder with no husband present, and 25.9% were non-families. 22.9% of all households were made up of individuals, and 12.9% had someone living alone who was 65 years of age or older. The average household size was 2.58 and the average family size was 3.03.

In the township the population was spread out, with 22.6% under the age of 18, 6.8% from 18 to 24, 24.5% from 25 to 44, 25.6% from 45 to 64, and 20.4% who were 65 years of age or older. The median age was 42 years. For every 100 females, there were 90.2 males. For every 100 females age 18 and over, there were 87.0 males.

The median income for a household in the township was $49,767, and the median income for a family was $59,675. Males had a median income of $40,774 versus $30,402 for females. The per capita income for the township was $22,783. About 3.8% of families and 6.6% of the population were below the poverty line, including 2.3% of those under age 18 and 17.7% of those age 65 or over.

== Government ==
=== Local government ===
Hopewell Township is governed under the Township form of New Jersey municipal government, one of 141 municipalities (of the 564) statewide that use this form, the second-most commonly used form of government in the state. The Township Committee is comprised of five members, who are elected directly by the voters at-large in partisan elections to serve three-year terms of office on a staggered basis, with either one or two seats coming up for election each year as part of the November general election in a three-year cycle. At an annual reorganization meeting, the Township Committee selects one of its members to serve as Mayor and another as Vice Mayor.

As of 2025, members of the Hopewell Township Committee are Mayor Roberta S. "Robin" Freitag (R, term on committee ends December 31, 2027; term as mayor ends 2025), Vice Mayor Thomas J. Tedesco Jr. (R, term on committee ends 2027; term as deputy mayor ends 2025), Kelsey Bayzick (R, 2026), David Miller (R, 2025) and Jeff Shimp (R, 2027).

=== Federal, state and county representation ===
Hopewell Township is located in the 2nd Congressional District and is part of New Jersey's 3rd state legislative district.

For the 119th United States Congress, New Jersey's 2nd congressional district is represented by Jeff Van Drew (R, Dennis Township). New Jersey is represented in the United States Senate by Democrats Cory Booker (Newark, term ends 2027) and Andy Kim (Moorestown, term ends 2031).

For the 2026–2027 session, the 3rd legislative district of the New Jersey Legislature is represented in the State Senate by John Burzichelli (D, Paulsboro) and in the General Assembly by David Bailey (D, Woodstown) and Heather Simmons (D, Glassboro).

Cumberland County is governed by a Board of County Commissioners composed of seven members who are elected at large by the citizens of Cumberland County in partisan elections and serve staggered three-year terms in office, with either two or three seats coming up for election each year in a three-year cycle. Annually, the seven board members select a Director and Deputy Director for one-year terms. As of 2025, members of the Cumberland County Board of County Commissioners (with party affiliation, residence and term-end year listed in parentheses) are:

Douglas A. Albrecht (R, Vineland, 2025), Deputy Director Antonio Romero (R, Vineland, 2027), Sandra Taylor (R, Downe Township; 2026), Victoria Groetsch-Lods (R, Vineland, 2025), Arthur Marchand (R, Hopewell Township, 2026), James Sauro (R, Vineland, 2026) and Robert A. Austino (D, Bridgeton, 2027).

The county's constitutional officers are: Clerk Celeste Riley (D, Bridgeton, 2029), Sheriff Michael Donato (R, Bridgeton, 2026) and Surrogate Rudolph Luisi (R, Vineland, 2028).

=== Politics ===
As of March 2011, there were a total of 3,133 registered voters in Hopewell Township, of which 786 (25.1%) were registered as Democrats, 805 (25.7%) were registered as Republicans and 1,538 (49.1%) were registered as Unaffiliated. There were 4 voters registered as Libertarians or Greens.

Gubernatorial election results for Hopewell Township
Year	Republican		Democratic		Third party(ies)	
Year	No.	%	No.	%	No.	%
2025	1,036	59.34%	696	39.86%	14	0.80%
2021	1,033	69.05%	452	30.21%	11	0.74%
2017	693	57.46%	480	39.80%	33	2.74%
2013	873	65.44%	442	33.13%	19	1.42%
2009	779	54.02%	563	39.04%	100	6.93%
2005	750	51.48%	668	45.85%	39	2.68%

In the 2012 presidential election, Republican Mitt Romney received 57.6% of the vote (1,188 cast), ahead of Democrat Barack Obama with 41.5% (856 votes), and other candidates with 0.9% (18 votes), among the 2,086 ballots cast by the township's 3,193 registered voters (24 ballots were spoiled), for a turnout of 65.3%. In the 2008 presidential election, Republican John McCain received 55.8% of the vote (1,248 cast), ahead of Democrat Barack Obama, who received 40.9% (913 votes), with 2,235 ballots cast among the township's 3,125 registered voters, for a turnout of 71.5%. In the 2004 presidential election, Republican George W. Bush received 59.4% of the vote (1,265 ballots cast), outpolling Democrat John Kerry, who received around 38.9% (828 votes), with 2,130 ballots cast among the township's 2,886 registered voters, for a turnout percentage of 73.8.

United States presidential election results for Hopewell Township 2024 2020 2016 2012 2008 2004
Year	Republican		Democratic		Third party(ies)	
Year	No.	%	No.	%	No.	%
2024	1,405	64.16%	768	35.07%	17	0.78%
2020	1,552	63.17%	864	35.16%	41	1.67%
2016	1,293	63.60%	673	33.10%	67	3.30%
2012	1,188	57.61%	856	41.51%	18	0.87%
2008	1,248	55.84%	913	40.85%	74	3.31%
2004	1,265	59.39%	828	38.87%	37	1.74%

In the 2013 gubernatorial election, Republican Chris Christie received 65.4% of the vote (873 cast), ahead of Democrat Barbara Buono with 33.1% (442 votes), and other candidates with 1.4% (19 votes), among the 1,350 ballots cast by the township's 3,099 registered voters (16 ballots were spoiled), for a turnout of 43.6%. In the 2009 gubernatorial election, Republican Chris Christie received 52.9% of the vote (779 ballots cast), ahead of both Democrat Jon Corzine with 38.2% (563 votes) and Independent Chris Daggett with 5.5% (81 votes), with 1,472 ballots cast among the township's 3,095 registered voters, yielding a 47.6% turnout.

United States Senate election results for Hopewell Township1
Year	Republican		Democratic		Third party(ies)	
Year	No.	%	No.	%	No.	%
2024	1,263	60.11%	763	36.32%	75	3.57%
2018	1,061	66.23%	496	30.96%	45	2.81%
2012	1,019	52.96%	868	45.11%	37	1.92%
2006	742	56.60%	539	41.11%	30	2.29%

United States Senate election results for Hopewell Township2
Year	Republican		Democratic		Third party(ies)	
Year	No.	%	No.	%	No.	%
2020	1,469	60.90%	895	37.11%	48	1.99%
2014	763	61.88%	446	36.17%	24	1.95%
2013	428	62.12%	251	36.43%	10	1.45%
2008	1,044	51.84%	919	45.63%	51	2.53%

== Education ==
The Hopewell Township School District serves public school students in kindergarten through eighth grade at Hopewell Crest School. As of the 2020–21 school year, the district, comprised of one school, had an enrollment of 496 students and 36.0 classroom teachers (on an FTE basis), for a student–teacher ratio of 13.8:1. The Shiloh School was closed after the end of the 2006–2007 school year, and all students from Shiloh are being sent to the Hopewell Crest School as part of a sending/receiving relationship, accounting for nearly 10% of the Hopewell district's enrollment.

Public school students in ninth through twelfth grades attend Cumberland Regional High School, which also serves students from Deerfield Township, Fairfield Township, Greenwich Township, Shiloh Borough, Stow Creek Township and Upper Deerfield Township. As of the 2022–23 school year, the high school had an enrollment of 1,124 students and 82.0 classroom teachers (on an FTE basis), for a student–teacher ratio of 13.7:1. The high school district has a nine-member board of education, with board seats allocated to the constituent municipalities based on population; Hopewell Township has one seat on the board.

Students are also eligible to attend Cumberland County Technical Education Center in Vineland, serving students from the entire county in its full-time technical training programs, which are offered without charge to students who are county residents.

== Transportation ==
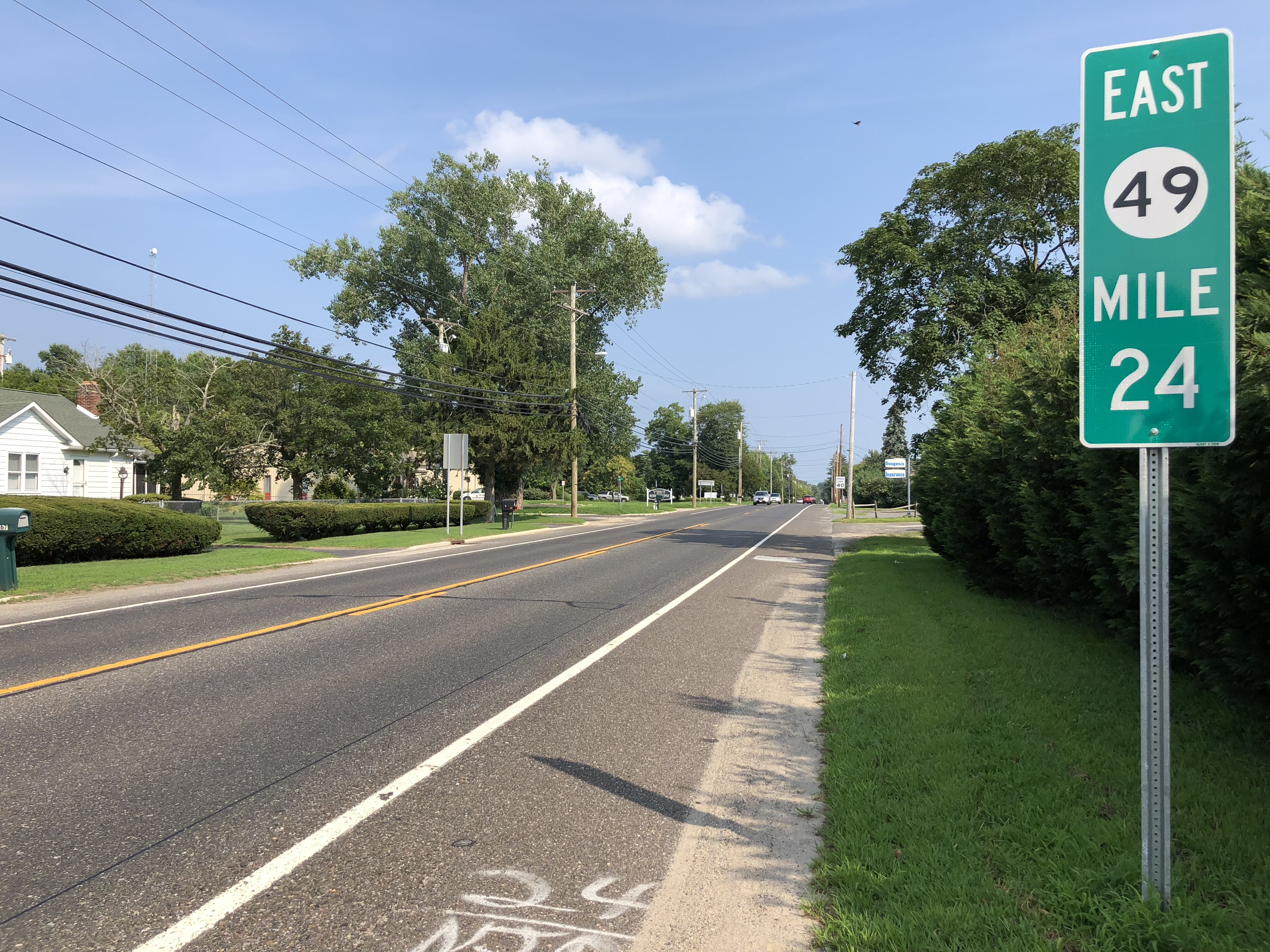
Route 49 eastbound in Hopewell Township

As of May 2010, the township had a total of 82.00 miles (131.97 km) of roadways, of which 27.02 miles (43.48 km) were maintained by the municipality, 52.51 miles (84.51 km) by Cumberland County and 2.47 miles (3.98 km) by the New Jersey Department of Transportation.

New Jersey Route 49 is the main highway providing access to Hopewell Township. County Route 540 also traverses the northern portion of the township.

== Notable people ==
People who were born in, residents of, or otherwise closely associated with Hopewell Township include:

- Harris Flanagin (1817– 1874), politician and lawyer who served as the 7th governor of Arkansas
- Charles Elmer Hires (1851–1937), inventor of root beer and namesake of Hires Root Beer
- Bloomfield H. Minch (1864–1929), politician who served as President of the New Jersey Senate.
- H. Boyd Woodruff (1917–2017), soil microbiologist who discovered actinomycin and developed industrial production by fermentation of many natural products, including cyanocobalamin (a synthetic form of Vitamin B12), the avermectins and other important antibiotics
