= Streptomyces sindenensis =

Scientific classification
- Domain: Bacteria
- Kingdom: Bacillati
- Phylum: Actinomycetota
- Class: Actinomycetes
- Order: Streptomycetales
- Family: Streptomycetaceae
- Genus: Streptomyces
- Species: S. sindenensis

Binomial name
- Streptomyces sindenensis Nakazawa and Fujii 1957

Type strain
- AS 4.0626, ATCC 23963, BCRC 11887, CBS 946.68, CCRC 11887, CGMCC 4.0626, CGMCC 4.1932, DSM 40255, ETH 24417, IFO 12915, IFO 3399, ISP 5255, JCM 4164, JCM 4669, KCTC 19971, Nakazawa 1071, NBRC 12915, NBRC 3399, NRRL B-1866, NRRL-ISP 5255, RIA 1181

Species of bacterium

Streptomyces sindenensis is a bacterium species from the genus of Streptomyces which has been isolated from soil in Japan. Streptomyces sindenensis produces actinomycin-D and the amicetin complex

== See also ==
- List of Streptomyces species
