= Ghost Hole =

Horror-themed dark ride on Coney Island

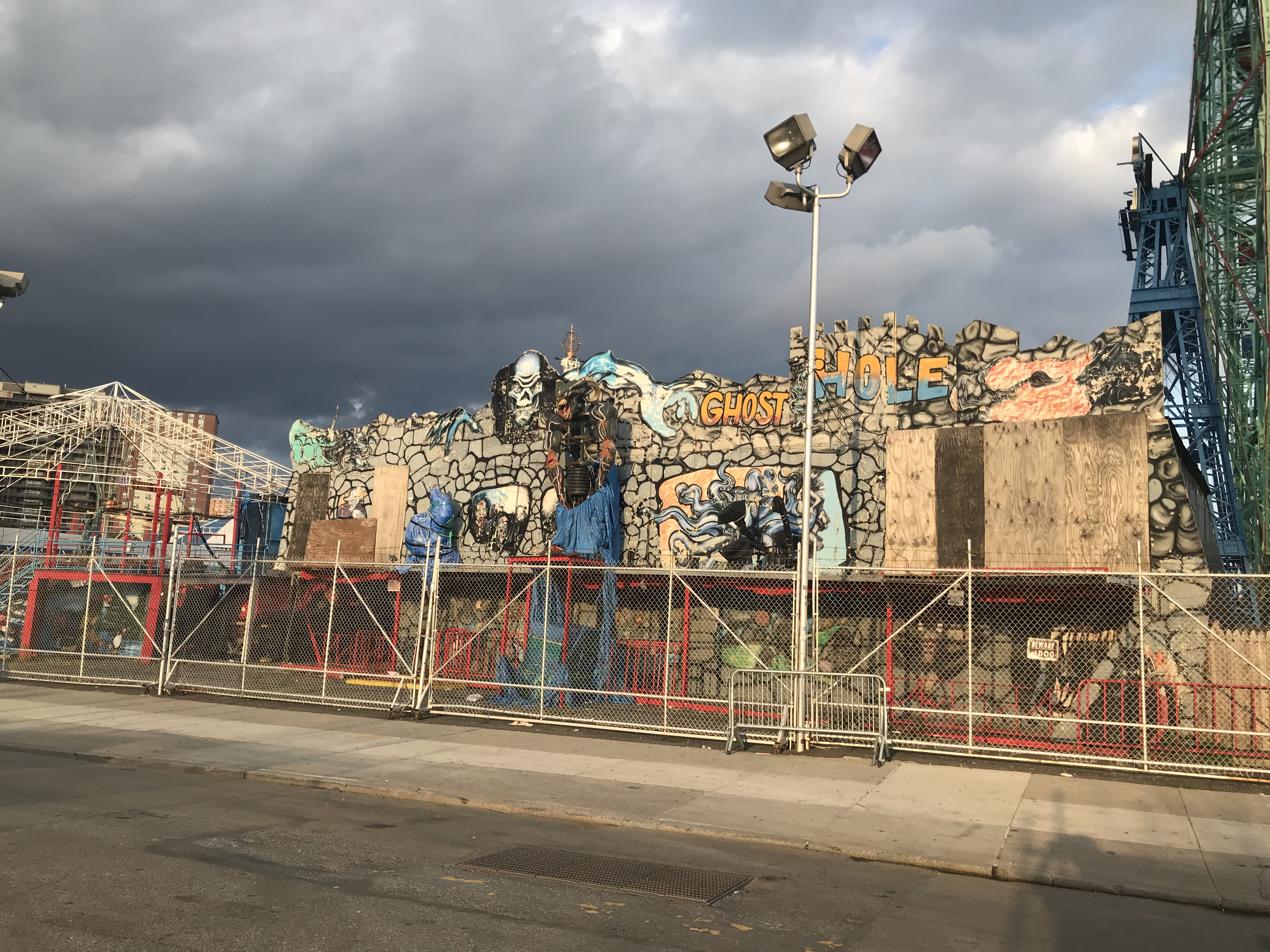
The Ghost Hole in 2019

The Ghost Hole was a horror-themed dark ride on Coney Island operated by 12th Street Amusements, a division of Li'l Sassy Anne, Inc. In 2021, the ride was removed and replaced by an expansion of Deno's Wonder Wheel Amusement Park, featuring a Vekoma suspended coaster named the Phoenix, and a kiddie coaster from SBF Visa in 2021.

In its heyday, the exterior of the ride was painted in graffiti-style imagery and two animated figures, a devil stirring a pot and a large growling demon. At one time, a morass of three serpents was another animated figure on the front of the ride, and other animated figures have been there previously. The serpents were absent for the first part of the 2007 season, though they later returned in greater quantity, though the two on the right come too close together, rubbing off the foam rubber eye of the rightmost serpent. A greenish vulture was also added to the leftmost window. In front of the ride, a glass case held an animatronic figure who simultaneously vomits and defecates while hunched over a toilet. The ride's cars were like bumper cars, but were in multiple colors and have heavier protective guards that are lowered over riders. After April 2009, two virtually identical vultures were placed on the exterior of the ride, the serpents were again removed, and the vomiter/defecator was given a female likeness, including a long blonde wig and a black skirt.

The ride opened with a long trek up a slope similar to a roller coaster. A halved man hung from the ceiling over the car, and the first full stunt passed was of an electric chair execution. After a brief U-turn outside, one was greeted by a bulging eyed bellhop and a plunge down another slope past several strands that made contact with the rider. At the bottom of this dark passage were torches, horror-oriented familial groups sitting together, torture victims, Tiki creatures, a snapping alligator, and another vomiting man (the vomit was obviously water sprayed hard and wide), among others. Some of these leaned threateningly toward the rider. This last and longest part of the ride was not a complete building, but housed in black tarpaulin. As far as sound effects, aside from thunder, there was a lot of gunfire, although no guns were shown.

== See also ==
- Dante's Inferno
- Spook-a-Rama
