= Pretzel Amusement Ride Company =

Amusement park ride manufacturer

- Industry: Amusement Rides
- Founded: 1928
- Founder: Leon Cassidy and Marvin Rempfer
- Defunct: 1979
- Fate: Defunct
- Headquarters: Bridgeton, New Jersey, U.S., United States
- Key people: Bill Cassidy
- Products: The Pretzel

The Pretzel Amusement Ride Company was an amusement ride manufacturer that produced a variety of rides, including an early dark ride known as The Pretzel, the company's namesake. It built over 1,400 rides for carnivals and amusement parks.

== Name ==
The company took its name from its trademark dark ride, The Pretzel, so called because of its track's winding, pretzel-like layout. It may also have been influenced by the comment of someone who rode the ride's prototype: "It felt like I was turned and twisted like a pretzel".

== History ==
The company was established in 1928 when founders Marvin Rempfer and Leon Cassidy patented a single-rail dark ride they built in Tumbling Dam Park on the banks of Sunset Lake in Bridgeton, New Jersey. The company remained in Bridgeton throughout its existence.

A large heavy pretzel design was originally affixed to the front of each car to prevent it from flipping backwards. In 1929, a standard Pretzel ride had five cars, 350 feet of track, a riding time of one and a half minutes, and sold for $1,200.

Portable pretzel rides for carnivals weighed about 9 tons. They were transported on huge moving vans. For the first three decades, Pretzel rides were single story. Beginning in the 1950s, two-story "double decker" rides were also made whose cars were hoisted to the second story by a lift chain during the ride. Leon Cassidy was not in favor of the double-decker version. The Mad Giant was 17 tons, 40'x 8' on trailer, and 70'x30' when opened, and took about five hours to set up. Pretzel also made spinning rides, including a famous one for Coney Island.

Leon's son William Cassidy ran the company after his father. He sold the rights to build the rides in 1979.

== List of rides ==
Pretzel rides were usually themed. They included The Caveman, Haunted House, Lost Mine, Gold Nugget, Thunderbird Jr. Ride, Toonerville Trolley, Whirlo, Kiddie Circus, Devil's Cave/Pirate's Cove/Bucket O' Blood (the same ride rethemed), Devils Inn, Winter Wonderland, Orient Express, Mad Giant, Laff in the Dark, Laff in the Dark with spinning cars, Laffland, Pirates Cave, Pirates Den, Paris After Dark, Arabian Nights Tunnel of Love/Casper's Ghostland, Treasure Island, Spook-A-Rama, Le Cachot/Safari/Zoomerang, and three versions of Dante's Inferno.

Name	Location	First year	Last year	Ref(s)
Haunted Mansion	Knoebels Amusement Resort	1973	Operating	
Haunted Pretzel	Bushkill Park	1927	2004	
Ghost Train	Blackpool Pleasure Beach	1930	Operating	
The Pretzel	Bay Shore Park	1931	Unknown	
The Pretzel	Hersheypark	1931	1963	
Zoomerang	Kennywood	1954	1960	
Safari	Kennywood	1961	1971	
Le Cachot	Kennywood	1972	1998	
The Pretzel	Conneaut Lake Park	Unknown	1966	
Devil's Den	Conneaut Lake Park	1968	Standing but not operating	
Haunted House	Camden Park	1919	Operating	
Laffland	Sylvan Beach Amusement Park		Operating	
Laff in the Dark	Kiddieland Amusement Park (Birmingham, AL)	1948	1979	
Spook-a-Rama	Deno's Wonder Wheel Amusement Park	1955	Operating	
Keansburg Mystery House	Keansburg Amusement Park	1931	1952	
Spook House	Keansburg Amusement Park	1953	2012	
Ghost Train	Lagoon Amusement Park	1947	1953	
SpooksHouse	Eldridge Park	1940s	1989	
Ghost Train	Luna Park Melbourne	1934	Operating	
