= H. Boyd Woodruff =

American microbiologist

- Born: July 22, 1917; Bridgeton, New Jersey
- Died: January 19, 2017 (aged 99); Watchung, New Jersey
- Education: Rutgers University
- Spouse: Jeanette Irene Whitner Woodruff (1920–2015)
- Children: Brian and Hugh
- Parent: Harold E. Woodruff

Harold Boyd Woodruff (July 22, 1917 – January 19, 2017) was an American soil microbiologist and a member of the National Academy of Sciences.

He is known for the discovery of actinomycin, and the development of the industrial production by fermentation of many natural products, including cyanocobalamin (a synthetic form of Vitamin B12, the avermectins, and other important antibiotics.

== Biography ==
He was born in Bridgeton, New Jersey into a farming family, that was forced to move out of the state during the Great Depression. His family relocated to Buffalo, New York, Virginia and Florida before returning to his home state. After returning to Hopewell Township, Cumberland County, New Jersey, he was able to make up the half-year of school he lost while in Florida attending a school in Shiloh that required him to walk several miles each day. He later attended Hopewell Township School before moving on to Bridgeton High School.

He received a bachelor's degree in soil chemistry from Rutgers University, followed by a Ph.D. from the same university in soil microbiology; his advisor was Selman Waksman. In his doctoral work, he discovered the antibiotics actinomycin and streptothricin. Albert Schatz used the leads from Woodruff's development of streptothricin to create streptomycin. As part of a lawsuit challenging Schatz's claim as discoverer of streptomycin, Woodruff was awarded 2% of the royalties, which he used to fund a scholarship for students at Rutgers studying microbiology.

He died on January 19, 2017, at the age of 99 at his home in Watchung, New Jersey.

== Career ==
He spent his career as a researcher at Merck & Co., rising to the position of executive director of Biological Sciences, and Executive Administrator of the Merck Sharp & Dohme Research Laboratories in Japan.

After retirement, he founded the firm Soil Microbiology Associates together with his wife Jeanette.

== Honors ==
Woodruff was elected to the Animal, Nutritional, and Applied Microbial Sciences section of the National Academy of Sciences in 1998, received the Waksman Award from the Theobald Smith Society in 2007, and received the NAS Award for the Industrial Application of Science in 2011.
