= West Park, New Jersey =

Populated place in Cumberland County, New Jersey, US

- Census-designated place
- Location in Cumberland County Location in New Jersey Location in the United States
- Coordinates: 39°26′25″N 75°15′55″W
- Country: United States
- State: New Jersey
- County: Cumberland
- Township: Hopewell

Area
  - Total: 1.31 sq mi (3.38 km^{2})
  - Land: 1.29 sq mi (3.35 km^{2})
  - Water: 0.012 sq mi (0.03 km^{2})
- Elevation: 86 ft (26 m)

Population (2020)
  - Total: 1,506
  - Density: 1,163.2/sq mi (449.12/km^{2})
- Time zone: UTC−05:00 (Eastern (EST))
  - Summer (DST): UTC−04:00 (EDT)
- ZIP Code: 08302 (Bridgeton)
- Area code: 856
- FIPS code: 34-79810
- GNIS feature ID: 2806220

West Park is a census-designated place (CDP) in Cumberland County, in the U.S. state of New Jersey. As of the 2020 census, West Park had a population of 1,506. It is in the northwest part of the county, within Hopewell Township, and it is bordered to the east by the city of Bridgeton, the county seat. New Jersey Route 49 passes through the CDP, northwest 14 miles (23 km) to Salem.

West Park was first listed as a CDP prior to the 2020 census.

== Demographics ==
Historical population
Census	Pop.	Note	%±
2020	1,506		—
U.S. Decennial Census

West Park first appeared as a census designated place in the 2020 U.S. census.

West Park CDP, New Jersey – Racial and ethnic composition Note: the US Census treats Hispanic/Latino as an ethnic category. This table excludes Latinos from the racial categories and assigns them to a separate category. Hispanics/Latinos may be of any race.
Race / Ethnicity (NH = Non-Hispanic)	Pop 2020	2020
White alone (NH)	1,133	75.23%
Black or African American alone (NH)	88	5.84%
Native American or Alaska Native alone (NH)	11	0.73%
Asian alone (NH)	8	0.53%
Native Hawaiian or Pacific Islander alone (NH)	0	0.00%
Other race alone (NH)	8	0.53%
Mixed race or Multiracial (NH)	58	3.85%
Hispanic or Latino (any race)	200	13.28%
Total	1,506	100.00%

== Education ==
Students are zoned to Hopewell Township School District (for elementary school) and Cumberland Regional School District (for high school).
