= Dutch Neck, New Jersey =

Dutch Neck is the name of two places in the U.S. state of New Jersey:

- Dutch Neck, Cumberland County, New Jersey
- Dutch Neck, Mercer County, New Jersey
