= Bowentown, New Jersey =

Populated place in Cumberland County, New Jersey, US

- Unincorporated community
- Location within Cumberland County. Inset: Location of Cumberland County within New Jersey. Bowentown (New Jersey) Bowentown (the United States)
- Coordinates: 39°25′28″N 75°16′25″W
- Country: United States
- State: New Jersey
- County: Cumberland
- Township: Hopewell
- Named after: Bowen family
- Elevation: 82 ft (25 m)
- Time zone: UTC−05:00 (Eastern (EST))
  - Summer (DST): UTC−04:00 (EDT)
- GNIS feature ID: 874868

Bowentown is an unincorporated community located within Hopewell Township, in Cumberland County, in the U.S. state of New Jersey. Located west of Bridgeton, Bowentown got its name from the Bowen family, one of Hopewell Township's first settlers.
