= Wonder Wheel =

Ferris wheel at Coney Island

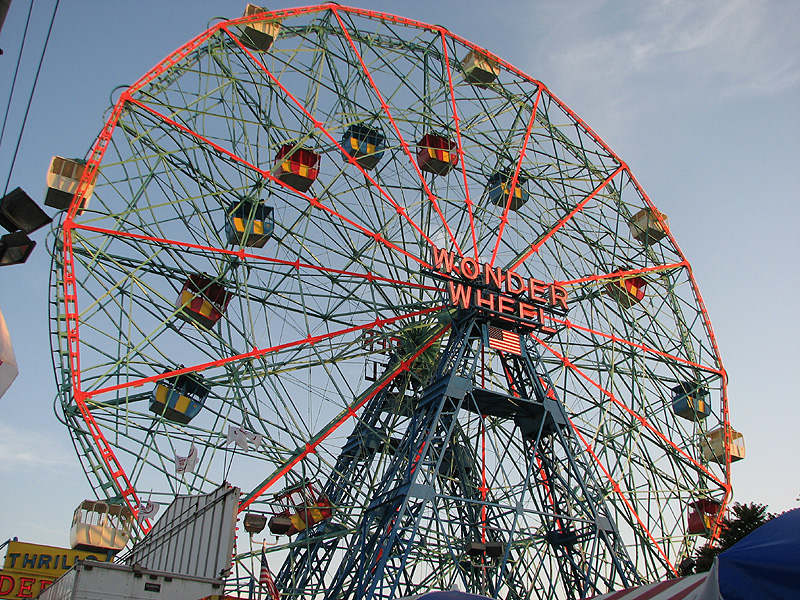
- Seen in 2018

Deno's Wonder Wheel Amusement Park
- Coordinates: 40°34′26.5″N 73°58′44.9″W
- Status: Operating
- Opening date: May 30, 1920; 106 years ago

New York City Landmark
- Designated: May 23, 1989
- Reference no.: 1708

Ride statistics
- Attraction type: Ferris wheel
- Manufacturer: Eccentric Ferris Wheel Company
- Model: Eccentric wheel
- Height: 150 ft (46 m)
- Vehicle type: Gondola
- Vehicles: 24
- Riders per vehicle: 6
- This is a pay-per-use attraction

The Wonder Wheel is a 150-foot-tall (46 m) eccentric Ferris wheel at Deno's Wonder Wheel Amusement Park at Coney Island in the New York City borough of Brooklyn. The wheel is located on a plot bounded by West 12th Street to the west, Bowery Street to the north, Luna Park to the east, and the Riegelmann Boardwalk to the south. As with other eccentric Ferris wheels, some of the Wonder Wheel's passenger cabins are not fixed directly to the rim of the wheel, but instead slide along winding sets of rails between the hub and the rim.

Built in 1920 as one of several Ferris wheels on Coney Island, the Wonder Wheel was designed by Charles Hermann and operated by Herman J. Garms Sr. and his son Fred for six decades. Despite the subsequent economic decline of Coney Island, the Wonder Wheel continued to operate each summer through the 20th century. In 1983, Herman Garms's son Fred and his cousin Walter Kerner Sr. sold the ride to the Vourderis family, who restored the attraction and continue to run the wheel as of 2023. The New York City Landmarks Preservation Commission designated the Wonder Wheel as an official New York City landmark in 1989, and minor modifications were subsequently made to the attraction.

== History ==
At the time of the Wonder Wheel's construction, Coney Island was one of the largest amusement areas in the United States. The first Ferris wheel in Coney Island was built for nearby Steeplechase Park in 1894 and was erroneously billed as "the world's largest". Several variations of the Ferris wheel were erected in the neighborhood in the 1900s and 1910s. The Wonder Wheel was unusual in that only one-third of its 24 cars were stationary, while the other two-thirds rolled on tracks within the wheel itself.

=== Garms ownership ===
==== Development and early years ====
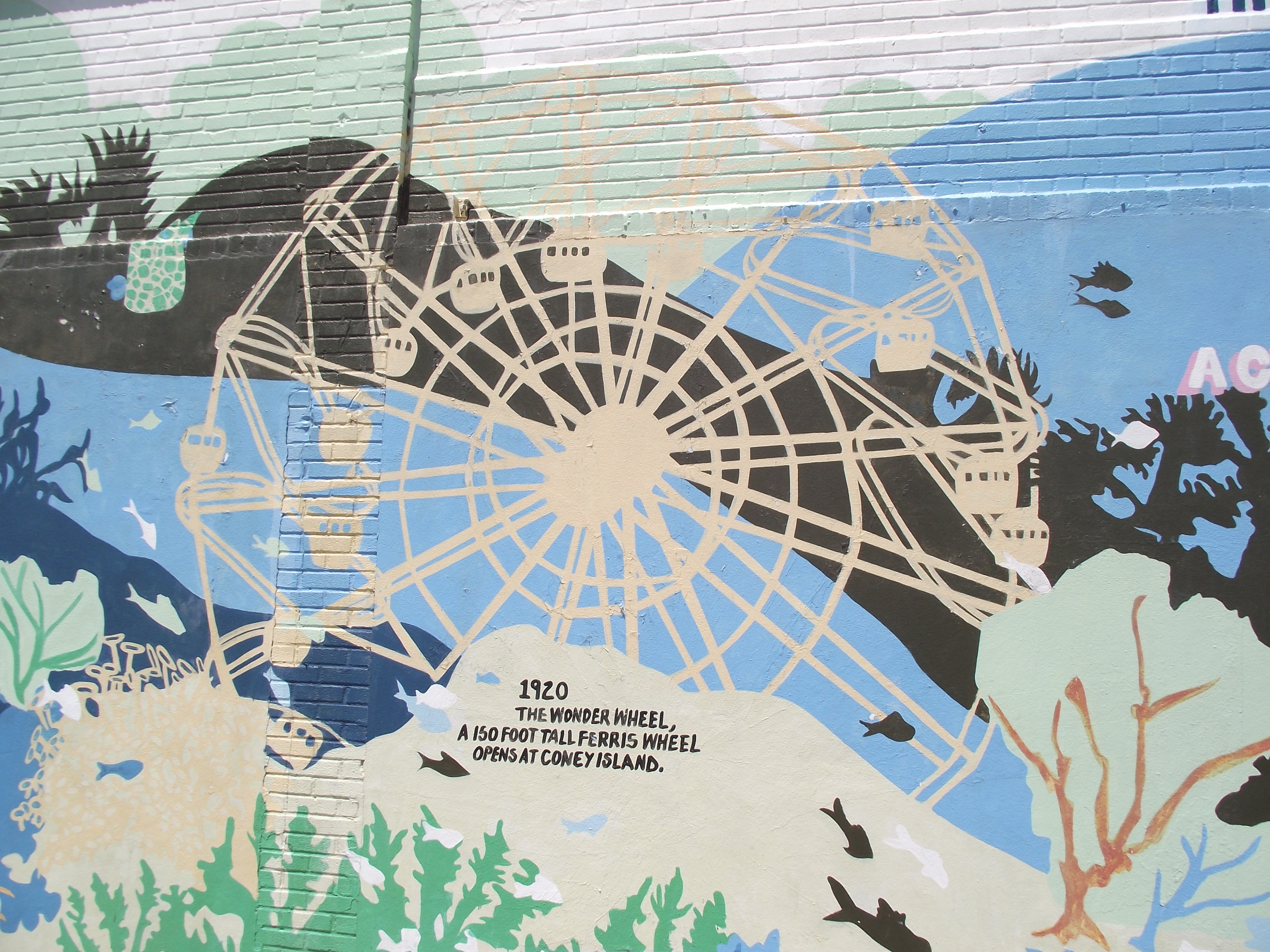
Depiction of Wonder Wheel on the New York Aquarium's south wall

The Wonder Wheel was designed by Charles Hermann (Note: Sometimes spelled Herrmann) as an improvement on G.W.G. Ferris's giant wheel, and it was built for Herman J. Garms Sr. between 1918 and 1920 by the Eccentric Ferris Wheel Company. Coney Island landowner William J. Ward provided the land for the Wonder Wheel's construction. Garms, who had no formal financial experience, sold stock to family, other Coney Island business holders, and steelworkers. Hermann sold all his shares in the wheel to raise money for construction and operation. Alfred (Fred) Garms, Herman Garms's son, recalled that his father employed anyone who was willing to help erect the ride, teaching them how to construct the wheel. After the local ironworkers' union heard about the project, they attempted to force the workers to join the union. The elder Garms named all of the workers as stockholders of the Eccentric Ferris Wheel Company, preventing them from being forced to unionize.

The wheel first opened on Memorial Day in 1920. Hermann originally called it the "Dip-the-Dip", promising to combine in his new invention "the thrill of a scenic railway, the fun of a Ferris wheel, and the excitement of the Chute-the-Chutes". To help with the Wonder Wheel's upkeep, the Garms family lived under the Wonder Wheel during the summers. With the success of the Wonder Wheel, the Eccentric Ferris Wheel Company hoped to build more "wonder wheels" on the East Coast of the United States by the mid-1920s. Fred Garms worked on the ride as a ticket operator during the summer in the 1920s, when he was a child. By the time Fred had graduated high school in the early 1930s, he worked on the ride year-round, maintaining it. After the ride's construction cost had been paid off, Herman Garms bought out most of the Eccentric Ferris Wheel Company's stockholders, then reduced the size of the corporation to a small number of people.

==== 1930s to 1970s ====
The Wonder Wheel was damaged in a 1933 fire that also burned down several attractions nearby. The wheel was also known as the "Eccentric Ferris Wheel" before being renamed the Wonder Wheel by 1940. During World War II, the lights on the Wonder Wheel were turned off due to a blackout order affecting Coney Island. The ride set an all-time daily ridership record on July 4, 1947, when it carried 14,506 passengers. The Wonder Wheel continued to operate through the 1950s, and it recorded its ten-millionth lifetime passenger in 1952. One account from 1953 described the ride as carrying thousands of passengers, with clients coming from the South and along the East Coast. At the time, although Herman Garms still owned the ride, Fred was the manager, and there were multiple longtime employees on payroll. The New York City Department of Buildings inspected the wheel each year, as each amusement ride in Coney Island could operate only with a license that expired every March, and the licenses could not be renewed without a building inspection.

By the 1960s, Fred Garms had taken over operation of the Wonder Wheel. Coney Island started to decline during the mid-20th century, and by 1964, it had seen its lowest number of visitors in 25 years. Despite subsequent attempts to redevelop the area, the Wonder Wheel continued to operate. Furthermore, it had not had any significant incidents in its history, making it a relatively well-off ride when other Coney Island attractions were closing. To discourage crime, the wheel and surrounding attractions were protected by two German Shepherds at night: one at the wheel's base and the other on an adjacent roof; during the day, the dogs rode around in one of the Wonder Wheel's cars, where the operator provided food and water for them. Off-duty security officers were also hired to prevent confrontations with the mafia. By the 1970s, the Wonder Wheel had carried more than 20 million lifetime riders. To keep up with expenses, the Wonder Wheel raised ticket prices significantly, from $0.50 in 1976 to $1.25 by 1981.

=== Vourderis ownership ===
==== 1980s and 1990s ====
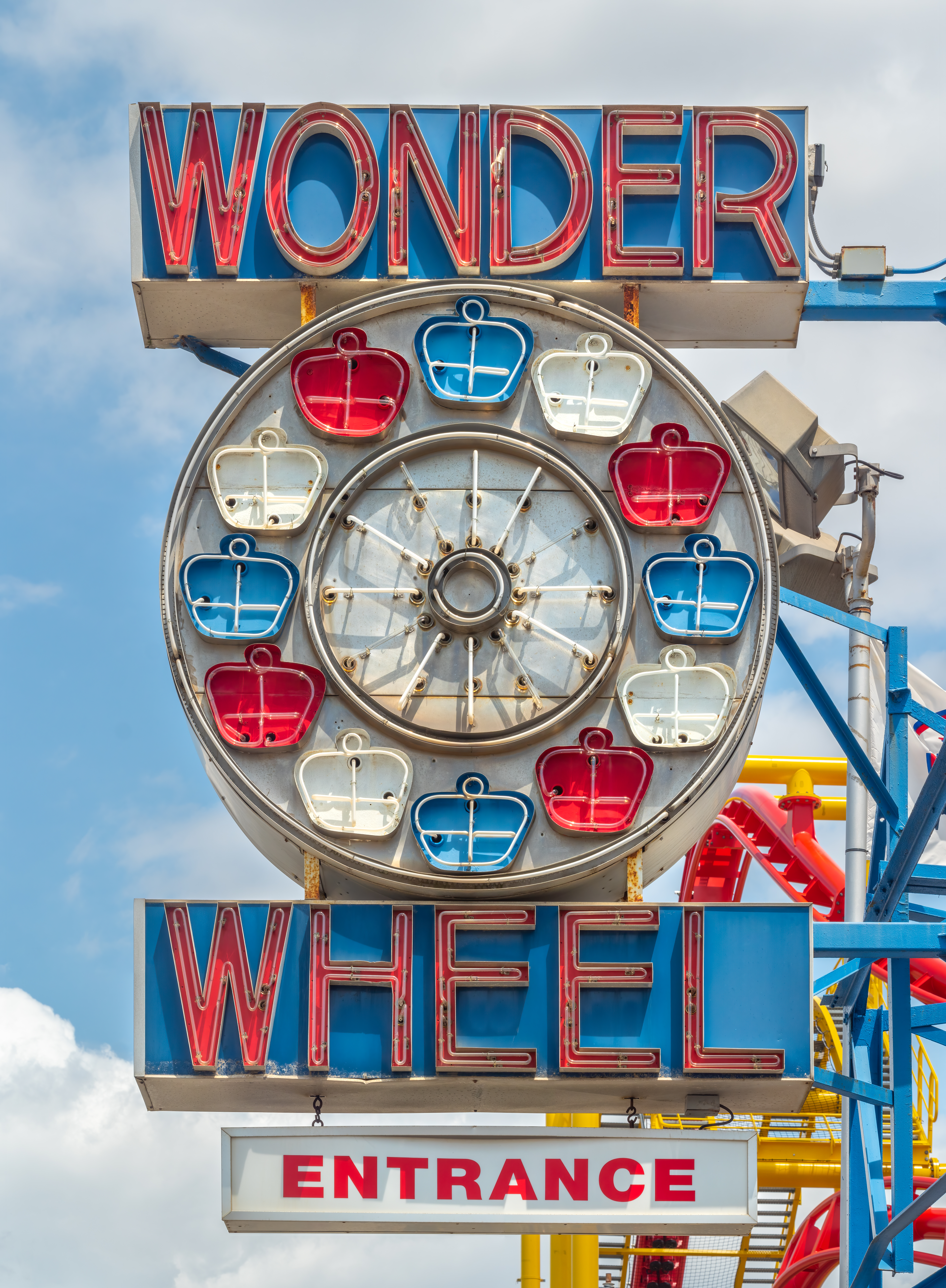
Wonder Wheel neon sign

Fred Garms was looking to sell the wheel by 1983, as he was getting older and unable to manage the wheel. Denos D. Vourderis had long been interested in buying the wheel from Garms. Vourderis was in a hospital recovering from a stabbing attack when Garms approached Deno's son Dennis on the possibility of purchasing the ride. On June 7, 1983, Vourderis bought the Wonder Wheel from Garms and his cousin Walter Kerner Sr., and it became "Deno's Wonder Wheel". The New York Times wrote that the only maintenance instructions given to the Vourderis family were the words "Good Luck" scribbled on a cardboard cigarette box. The ride cost Vourderis $250,000. He stated that part of the wheel's allure had come from when he had proposed to his future wife Lula atop the wheel 36 years prior to the purchase: he had promised to give the wheel to his wife as a future gift.

The Vourderis family restored the Wonder Wheel and made it the central attraction of Deno's Wonder Wheel Amusement Park, which Denos had acquired in 1980. They spent $250,000 to restore the wheel. Vourderis planned to begin allowing couples to host weddings on the ride, and he also rented it out for film shoots. He had paid off the ride's cost by 1985, and a 65th-anniversary celebration for the ride was hosted the same year. Vourderis acquired the land for $150,000 in 1987, and the New York City Landmarks Preservation Commission (LPC) first considered designating the ride as a city landmark in July of that year. Although Vourderis initially supported the designation when it was proposed, Newsday said he became "angry at the city" after learning that the designation would force him to ask the city for permission to repair the ride. Following public hearings in May 1989, the LPC formally designated the ride as a landmark that year.

By the early 1990s, the Wonder Wheel had offered free advertising space to the McDonald's fast-food chain, which had two franchises near the wheel. Fearing that the distinctive McDonald's logo would overshadow the Wonder Wheel itself, the LPC voted against allowing a McDonald's logo on the wheel, despite allowing Vourderis to put "Deno's" above the "Wonder Wheel" sign on the wheel's hub. Upon Deno's death in the mid-1990s, control of the wheel and the amusement park passed to Dennis Vourderis.

==== 2000s to present ====
In the 2000s, Deno's grandchildren also became involved in the operation of the wheel. Despite the redevelopment of Coney Island and the erection of the nearby Luna Park in 2010, the wheel and associated amusement park continued to operate. The Wonder Wheel received a new solar-powered lighting system in 2012, replacing a lighting system that had been broken for three decades. Even during the aftermath of 2012's Hurricane Sandy, when Deno's Amusement Park was flooded, the Wonder Wheel was only slightly damaged and reopened the next year. The Vourderis family had planned to celebrate the Wonder Wheel's centenary with a three-day celebration in May 2020, but this was postponed due to the COVID-19 pandemic in New York City, which shuttered all businesses deemed non-essential. The 2020 season was the first in which the Wonder Wheel did not operate at all; the Wonder Wheel ultimately reopened in April 2021. The centennial celebration was rescheduled for after the 2021 reopening.

As of 2024, the Wonder Wheel is the oldest continuous operating ride at Coney Island, and Dennis Vourderis and his brother Steve continue to operate the Wonder Wheel and the amusement park. Deno's Wonder Wheel Amusement Park is the last family-operated amusement park in Coney Island, though several developers have made offers for the amusement park and wheel, the Vourderis family has refused to sell.

== Description ==
=== Design ===
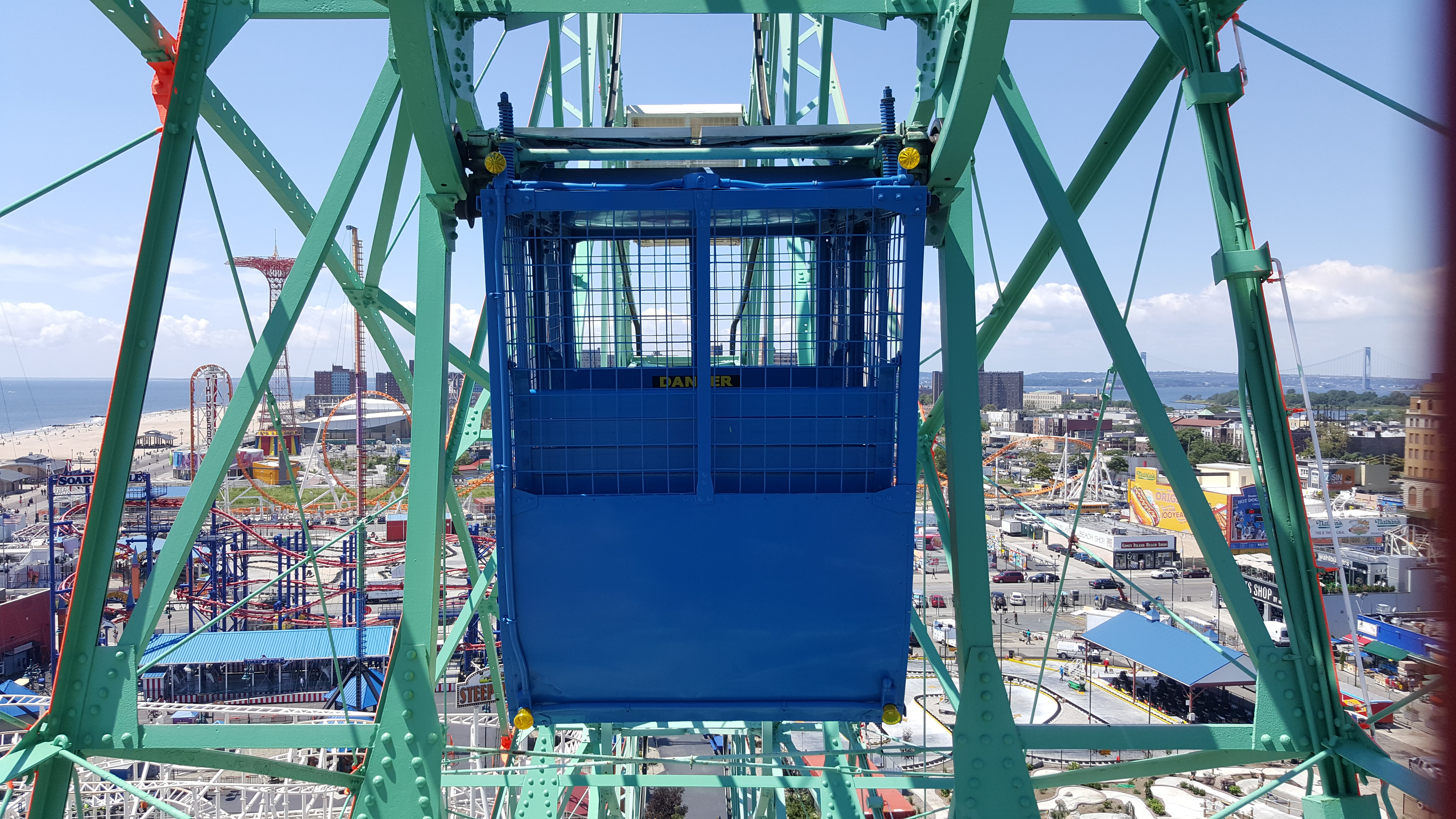
On-ride view, showing one of the cabins on one of the Wonder Wheel's tracks as seen from the cabin behind it

The Wonder Wheel is located at 3059 West 12th Street, just north of the Riegelmann Boardwalk. Its entrance plaza is composed of a steel structure with plywood-and-corrugated metal. The hub of the wheel, supported by two blue-painted legs shaped like the letter "A", contains an illuminated sign with orange letters spelling "wonder wheel" in all capital letters. There are sixteen spokes extending from the hub, each connected at their outer ends by a hexadecagonal frame and braced by green beams, each connected through rivets and gusset plates. The eight stationary cars on the hexadecagonal frame are painted white while the sixteen motion-capable cars are painted red-and-yellow or blue-and-yellow. At West 12th Street is a neon sign weighing 700 pounds (320 kg), overhangs the sidewalk by 7.5 feet (2.3 m), and is raised 10 feet (3.0 m) above the sidewalk; the sign contains letters spelling "wonder wheel" and arrows pointing to the actual wheel. Yet another Wonder Wheel sign with arrows is located on a southern approach to the wheel.

The wheel itself is 150 feet (46 m) tall and weighs 200 short tons (180 t), and it is powered by a 40 horsepower (30 kW) motor. It has 24 fully enclosed passenger cars with a total combined capacity of 144. The cars each have an official capacity of six people, but they formerly could carry between eight and ten people. Each rotation of the wheel takes ten minutes, giving the ride a total hourly capacity of 864. Sixteen of the cars slide inward on snaking tracks, falling outward as the wheel rotates. The remaining eight cars are fixed to the rim, giving a traditional Ferris wheel experience to passengers. Originally, the Wonder Wheel was located on two large concrete footers above a 15-foot (4.6 m) pool of water. The concrete footers are pyramids measuring 8 feet (2.4 m) wide, tapering in length from 60 feet (18 m) at their bottoms to 6 feet (1.8 m) at their tops.

=== Rides ===
There is no height restriction for the Wonder Wheel. In 2015, a Newsday article estimated that 200,000 people ride the Wonder Wheel every year. As of 2018, over 35 million rides had been taken on the wheel since it first opened. There are separate queues for the stationary and moving cars. A ride on the Wonder Wheel costs 10 credits; the cost of each credit varies depending on how many are purchased. Each ride consists of two rotations around the Wonder Wheel.

=== Safety ===
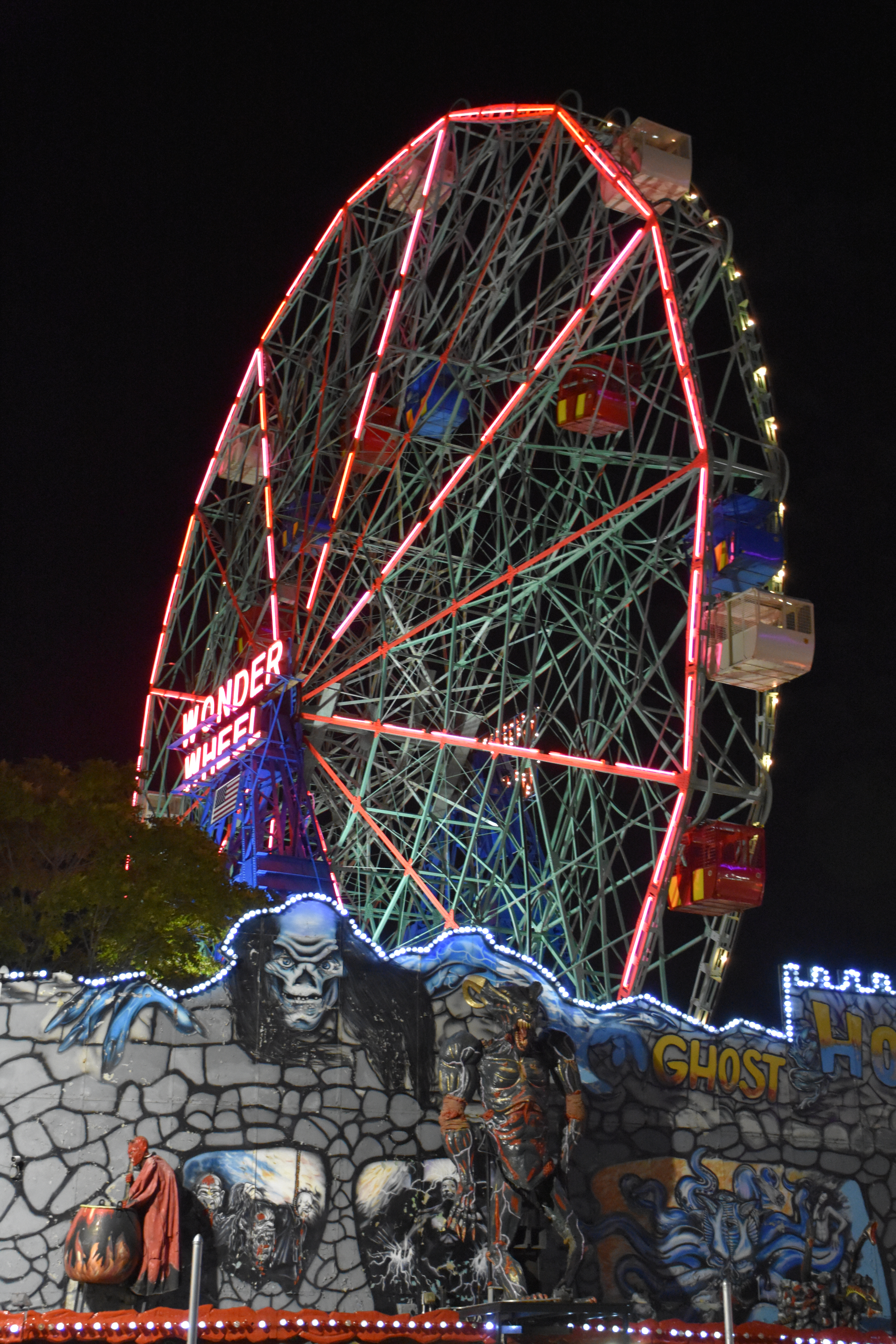
Seen at night

The Wonder Wheel has had a strong safety record. The former owner-operator of the ride, Fred Garms, told the New York Daily News in 1981 that "I put my money into maintenance. [...] My father used to say, 'The dollar you don't put in today will cost you $2 tomorrow.'" News outlets reported in 2006 that the Wonder Wheel had not experienced any significant incidents in its history, operating every summer season since its opening; this remained true even after Hurricane Sandy flooded the surrounding amusement park in 2012. The wheel was also designed with an emergency hand crank in case of power outages.

The ride's first owner-operator, Herman Garms, overhauled and painted the ride each year, to protect it from the harsh weather associated with New York winters. The tradition of winter maintenance continued with the Wonder Wheel's subsequent owners. The only time the wheel stopped while not under the control of the operator was during the New York City blackout on July 13, 1977. The owners hand-cranked the wheel around to evacuate the passengers.

== Impact ==
=== Reception ===
A Science and Invention article said the Wonder Wheel provided a "real thrill like you have probably never had before—at least not at this great height." A Billboard article from 1924 stated that the wheel's "mechanical construction attracts attention from engineers and mechanics, and its novel arrangement does the same for the amusement seeker. The only criticism is that it is very slow in making its revolutions..." The Los Angeles Times, describing the ride's design in 1975, called it a "fabulous construction of metal struts, gears, cables and cages". Another critic wrote that the ride "turns slowly, almost sedately, its enclosed cars swaying" in contrast to the "pandemonium" of the surrounding area.

A writer for the St. Louis Post-Dispatch stated in 2000 that when "the cars begin to swing like a pendulum [...] you swear the entire structure is collapsing." In 2006, a writer for the Central New Jersey Home News praised the views from the Wonder Wheel, saying that "a trip would not be complete without a spin on the Cyclone, a trip to the top of Deno's Wonder Wheel or a corn dog at Nathan's." In 2015, a Newsday reporter contrasted the two experiences of the Wonder Wheel's stationary and moving cars: the stationary-car experience was described as being "so pleasant a baby can ride it without alarm", but the swinging-car experience was "more like a catch-your-breath thrill".

=== Cultural influence ===
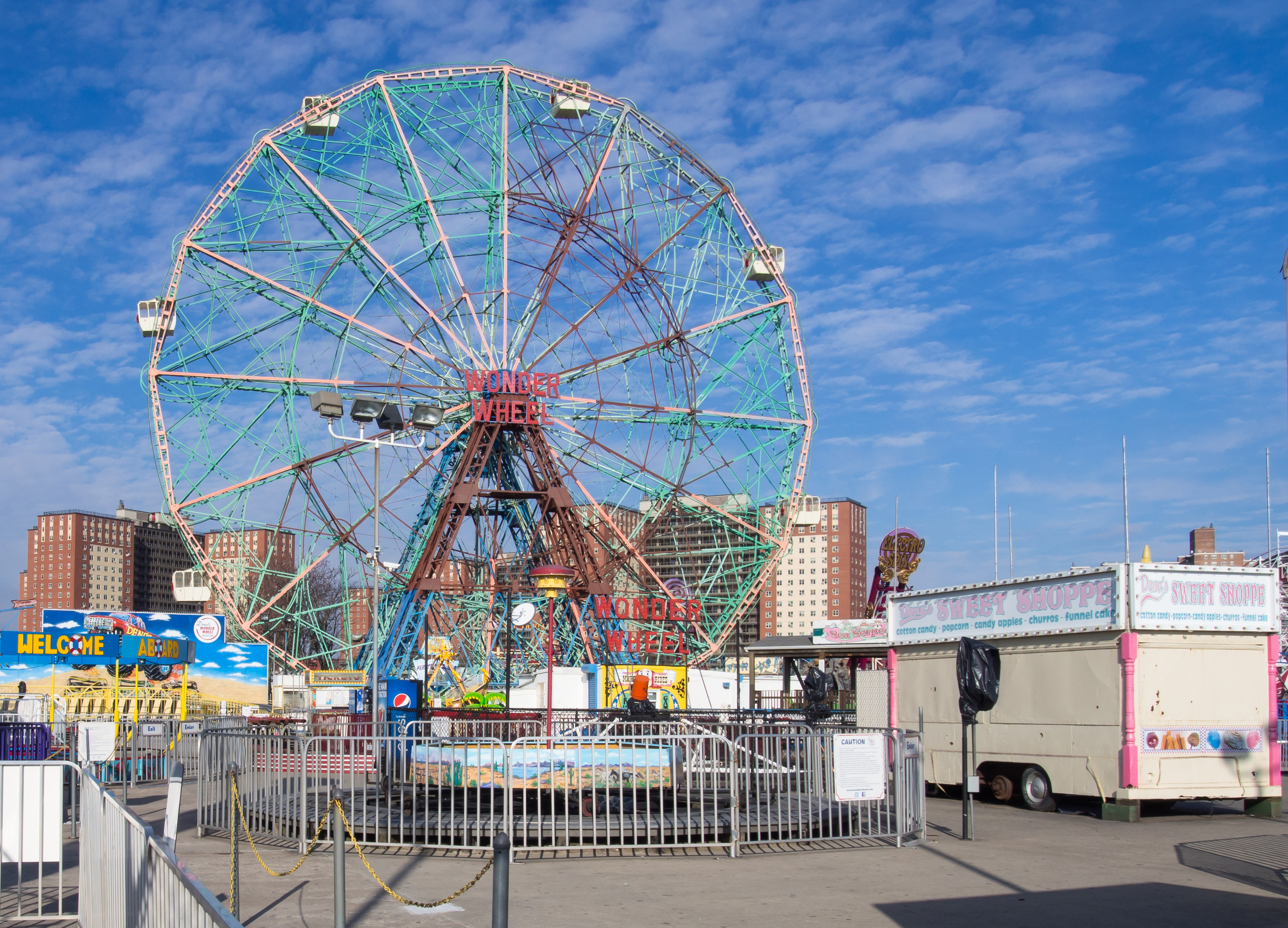
Seen in 2016

The New York Times called the Wonder Wheel "the jewel of the showy, boomtown Coney Island that rose along the newly widened beach in the Roaring Twenties". Although the Wonder Wheel was not replicated through the late 20th century, it subsequently inspired at least two replicas. Pixar Pal-A-Round, a 150-foot-tall (46 m) eccentric Ferris wheel at Disney California Adventure, opened in 2001 and was initially known as Sun Wheel and Mickey's Fun Wheel. There was also a replica at Yokohama Dreamland in Japan.

Due to its prominence on Coney Island, the Wonder Wheel has been depicted in numerous movies, such as The Warriors, and Remo Williams: The Adventure Begins; and television shows including Mr. Robot and The Marvelous Mrs. Maisel. At least one film is named after the attraction: Wonder Wheel (2017), set on Coney Island in the 1950s.

The attraction is the subject of a song by Dan Zanes, "Wonder Wheel". The Klezmatics' 2006 album Wonder Wheel, which contains lyrics by onetime Coney Island resident Woody Guthrie, mentions the Wonder Wheel as well. It is also referenced in Phoebe Bridgers's 2026 song "As Above".

In addition, the Wonder Wheel has been the setting for many engagements and weddings throughout its history. In August 2020, historian Charles Denson published a book about the Wonder Wheel, titled Coney Island’s Wonder Wheel Park.

== See also ==
- List of New York City Designated Landmarks in Brooklyn
