= Cohansey Township, New Jersey =

Township in New Jersey, United States

Coordinates: 39.38849°N 75.31550°W

Cohansey Township was a township that existed in Cumberland County, New Jersey, United States, during two separate periods, from 1697 to 1748 and from 1848 to 1865. The name was derived from the Cohansey River, which flows through the area.

The first Cohansey Township was mentioned dating back to May 12, 1697, while the area was still part of Salem County. This first incarnation was dissolved upon the formation of Cumberland County on January 19, 1748.

The second Cohansey Township was incorporated by an Act of the New Jersey Legislature on March 6, 1848, from portions of Hopewell Township. Bridgeton city was incorporated on March 1, 1865, replacing both Bridgeton Township and Cohansey Township, both of which were then dissolved.
