= Mary Elmer Lake =

- Location within New Jersey Location within the United States
- Location: Hopewell Township / Bridgeton, Cumberland County, New Jersey
- Coordinates: 39.4465°N 75.2506°W
- Type: reservoir
- Catchment area: 7.5 sq mi (19 km^{2})
- Basin countries: United States
- Surface area: 22 acres (8.9 ha)

Mary Elmer Lake is a reservoir on the Cohansey River in Cumberland County, New Jersey, used for water-supply and recreation purposes.

== Description ==
The lake is located in the park system of the city of Bridgeton, New Jersey, and is owned by the city. While the dam is within the city limits, most of the lake is within neighboring Hopewell Township. At normal levels it has a surface area of 22 acres (8.9 ha).

Mary Elmer Lake Dam is of earthen construction, a gravity dam, with a height of 15 feet (4.6 m) and a length of 500 feet (150 m). Maximum discharge is 4,078 cubic feet (115.5 m^{3}) per second. Normal storage is 68 acre-feet (84,000 m^{3}). It drains an area of 7.5 square miles (19 km^{2}). The lake is fed by Barrett's Run, and the lake's water empties via a small stream into nearby Sunset Lake and thence into the Cohansey River.

== History ==
Mary Elmer Lake was originally known as Ireland's Mill Pond. Construction of the dam was completed in 1924 by the U.S. Army Corps of Engineers. The name was later changed to Mary Elmer Lake.

== See also ==
- Bridgeton, New Jersey Flood of 1934
