= Dutch Neck, Cumberland County, New Jersey =

Populated place in Cumberland County, New Jersey, US

Dutch Neck, New Jersey
- Census-designated place
- Location in Cumberland County Location in New Jersey Location in the United States
- Coordinates: 39°24′2″N 75°16′51″W
- Country: United States
- State: New Jersey
- County: Cumberland
- Township: Hopewell

Area
  - Total: 0.46 sq mi (1.19 km^{2})
  - Land: 0.46 sq mi (1.19 km^{2})
  - Water: 0 sq mi (0.00 km^{2})
- Elevation: 40 ft (12 m)

Population (2020)
  - Total: 123
  - Density: 266.7/sq mi (102.97/km^{2})
- Time zone: UTC−05:00 (Eastern (EST))
  - Summer (DST): UTC−04:00 (EDT)
- ZIP Code: 08302 (Bridgeton)
- Area code: 856
- FIPS code: 34-18632
- GNIS feature ID: 2806075

Dutch Neck is a census-designated place (CDP) located in Cumberland County, in the U.S. state of New Jersey. It is in the northwestern part of the county, in the southern part of Hopewell Township. It is 4 miles (6 km) southwest of Bridgeton, the county seat.

Dutch Neck was first listed as a CDP prior to the 2020 census.

== Demographics ==
Historical population
Census	Pop.	Note	%±
2020	123		—
U.S. Decennial Census; 2020

Dutch Neck first appeared as a census designated place in the 2020 U.S. census.

Dutch Neck CDP, New Jersey – Racial and ethnic composition Note: the US Census treats Hispanic/Latino as an ethnic category. This table excludes Latinos from the racial categories and assigns them to a separate category. Hispanics/Latinos may be of any race.
Race / Ethnicity (NH = Non-Hispanic)	Pop 2020	2020
White alone (NH)	91	73.98%
Black or African American alone (NH)	11	8.94%
Native American or Alaska Native alone (NH)	1	0.81%
Asian alone (NH)	0	0.00%
Native Hawaiian or Pacific Islander alone (NH)	0	0.00%
Other race alone (NH)	0	0.00%
Mixed race or Multiracial (NH)	5	4.07%
Hispanic or Latino (any race)	15	12.20%
Total	123	100.00%

As of 2020, the population for the area was 123.

== Education ==
Students are zoned to Hopewell Township School District (for elementary school) and Cumberland Regional School District (for high school).
