= Spook-a-Rama =

Amusement park ride in Coney Island

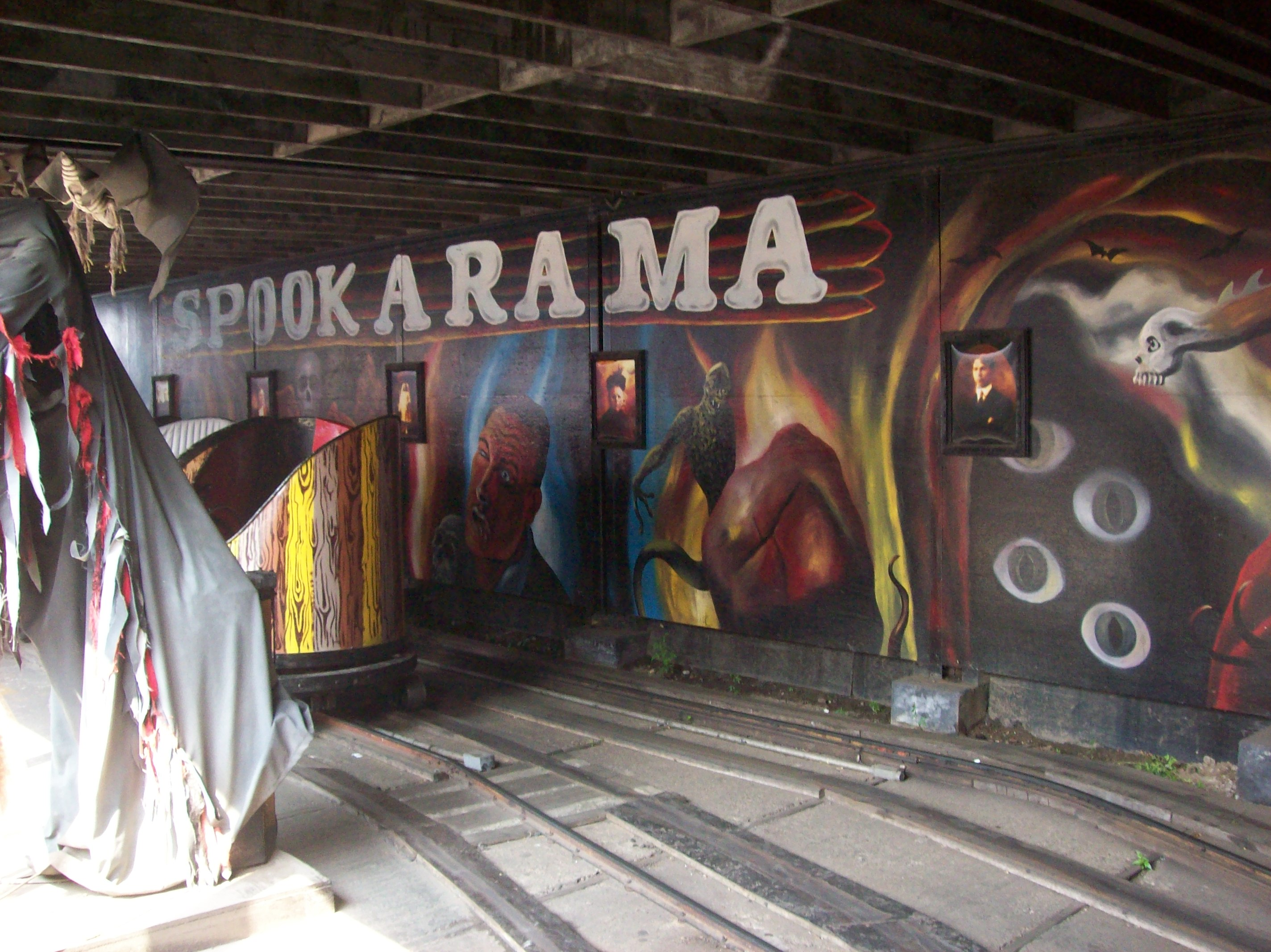
Spook-A-Rama's barrel-like cars waiting in the lobby area.

Spook-a-Rama is a dark ride haunted attraction from the Pretzel Amusement Ride Company located at Deno's Wonder Wheel Amusement Park on Coney Island and run by Million Amusement Corp. It opened in 1955. The rider is pulled around in a car resembling an old wooden barrel. These barrels look like connected cars, but separate from each other at the beginning of the ride, so the rider must go in alone, passing paintings that change imagery, and a skeleton before the car itself forces the doors open. Inside, the ride is one large, poorly lit room. The ride had a major renovation done by Scarefactory Inc of Columbus, Ohio prior to the 2013 season.

Some of the old views included zombies, the face of an ogre composed of light bulbs, a demon slashing an axe toward the rider, a man in a straitjacket being electrically shocked, heads popping out of barrels, and a gruesome man being killed in an electric chair. On the way out of the ride, stringy objects hang from the ceiling that provided an extra fright.

These old scenes inside the ride have been replaced. New scenes include several skeletons emerging from a crypt and two giant rats. At least two air cannons have been installed in the ride. There is also a camera that takes photos of guests when they're hit with the first air cannon.

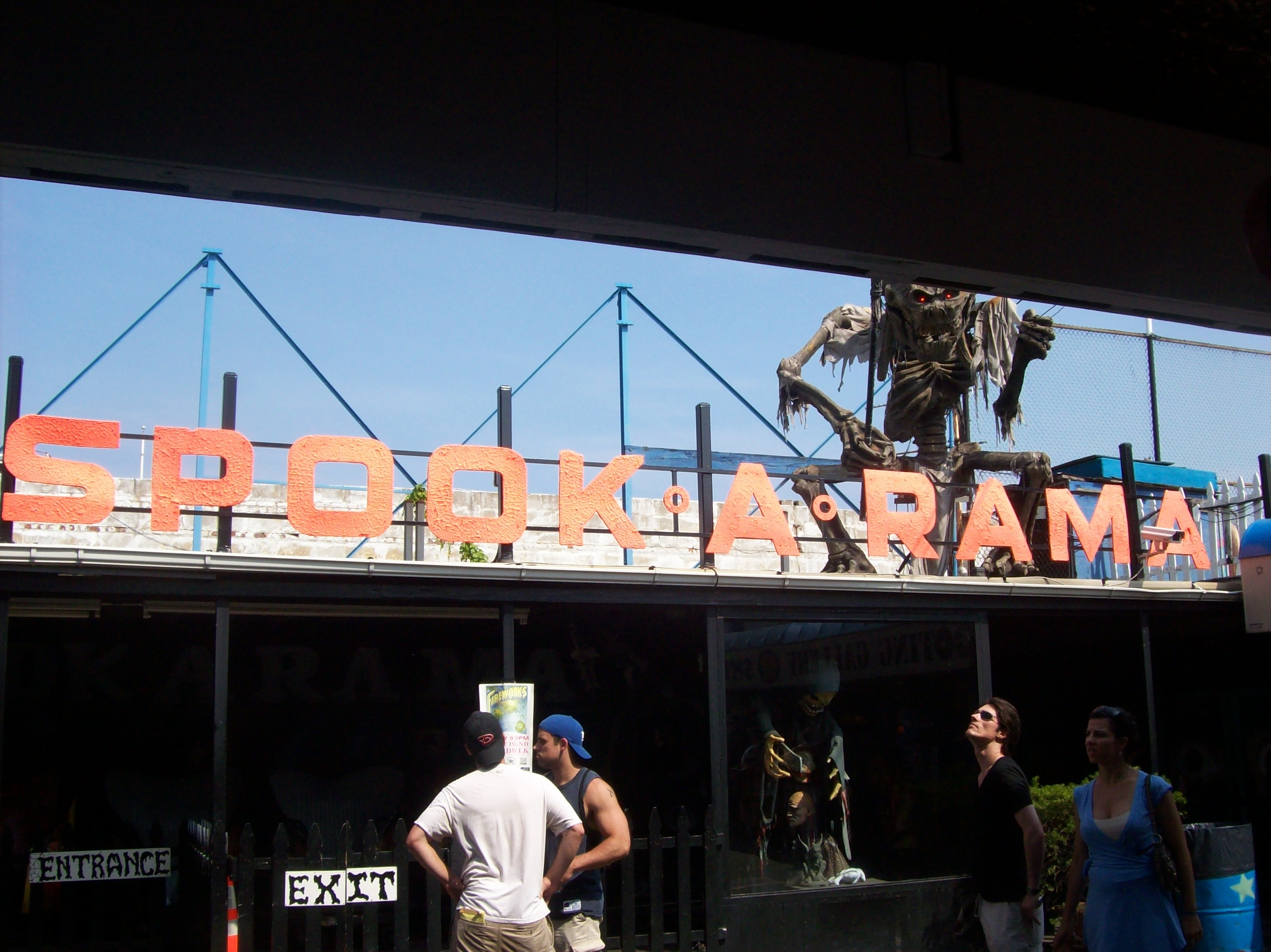
Spook-a-Rama's Grim Reaper and Giant Native Skeleton were seen by non-riders and have since been replaced by a dragon.

The ride would last about 45 seconds and proceed in roughly a u-shape, with small sharp curves. At one time, the ride ran over ten minutes and was billed as the longest ride on Coney Island, and the longest spook ride in the world. The current area is less than one-third of the original ride, and its views may be quite different from what was once located there. The arcade and shooting gallery that now stand next to it were once part of the ride, while another portion of the ride was outdoors, the displays there lit only at night. This area is now the walled walkway to the children's portion of the park.

As of 2019 the admission price is $8.00, or 8 credits at Deno's Wonder Wheel Amusement Park.

== See also ==
- Dante's Inferno
- Ghost Hole
- Haunted Mansion, dark rides at Disney theme parks
