= Bridgeton flood of 1934 =

Natural disaster in New Jersey, United States

Coordinates: 39°25′46″N 75°13′50″W

The Flood of 1934 was a natural disaster that hit the town of Bridgeton, New Jersey on August 2 and 3, 1934. Over the course of three days, storms brought 7 inches (180 mm) of rain to the region, swelling Sunset Lake and other local interconnected waterways. At the time, there were two earthen dams holding the water back at Sunset Lake and Mary Elmer Lake. Eventually the pressure was too much and the dams gave way sending a torrent of water down the Cohansey River as well as tributaries connected to the Lakes. The wall of water surged down through the banks of the Cohansey, emptying the lakes and the Raceway and flowing into and through downtown Bridgeton, which straddles the river. All the bridges that connected the east and west sides of the town were destroyed. Also damaged was Tumbling Dam Park, where the dam that held the water of Sunset Lake was located. An estimated $1 million (equivalent to $23.5 million in 2024) in damage was caused by the flooding.

== Aftermath ==
In the aftermath of the flood, residents had no way of crossing the Cohansey River from one side of the town to the other. To go around the river meant a 21-mile (34 km) detour. The citizens were given short term relief when a Troop of Sea Scouts (associated with the Boy Scouts of America) used a donated lifeboat to set up a temporary ferry service by stringing a rope across the river and pulling the boat back and forth, earning $85 by charging a five-cent fare for an estimated 5,000 passengers. Later, the United States Army Corps of Engineers came in and set up a temporary pontoon bridge. In the photographs taken at the time, the pontoon bridge appears to be very flimsy. In fact it was very stable, and one could drive a car across it.

Due to the surge of water during the flood, much debris was deposited in the Cohansey River, making navigation of the waterway dangerous. The city hired a hard-hat diver to help in the removal of the debris.
