= John and Elizabeth Remington House =

- U.S. National Register of Historic Places
- New Jersey Register of Historic Places
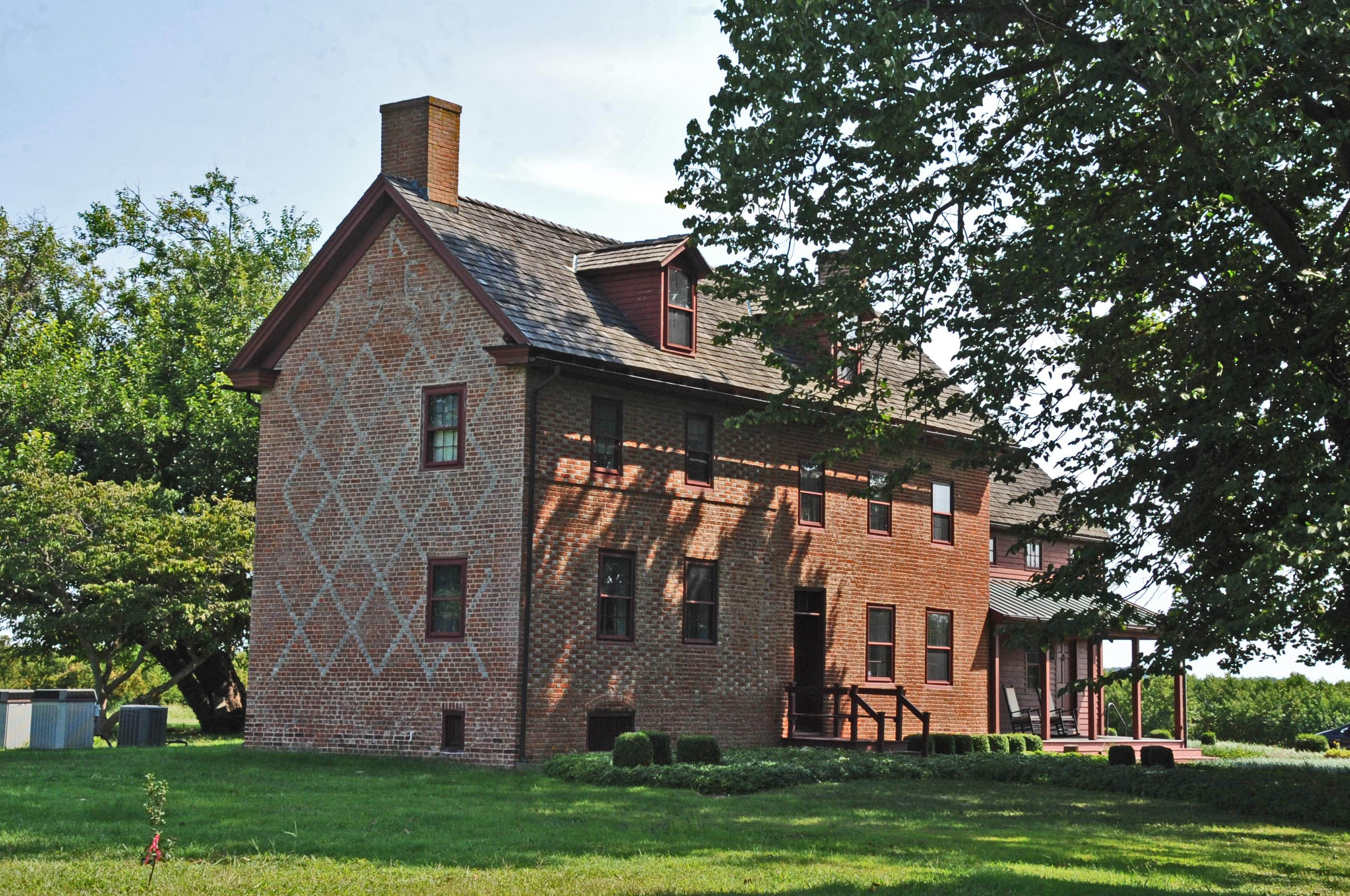

- Location within Cumberland County, New Jersey Location within New Jersey Location within the United States
- Location: 689 Roadstown Road; Hopewell Township, New Jersey
- Coordinates: 39°26′24″N 75°18′41″W
- Built: 1728
- Architectural style: Colonial, Federal
- NRHP reference No.: 15000420
- NJRHP No.: 5370

Significant dates
- Added to NRHP: July 14, 2015
- Designated NJRHP: May 26, 2015

The John and Elizabeth Remington House is a historic patterned brick building located at 689 Roadstown Road in Hopewell Township of Cumberland County, New Jersey, United States. The oldest section of the house dates to 1728. It was added to the National Register of Historic Places on July 14, 2015, for its significance in architecture.

== History and description ==
John and Elizabeth Remington built the two and one-half story brick house in 1728. The patterned brickwork includes the year and their initials. Later, c. 1815, a two story brick wing with a new kitchen was added by James Brooks. The addition features Federal architecture.

== See also ==
- National Register of Historic Places listings in Cumberland County, New Jersey
- List of the oldest buildings in New Jersey
- Abel and Mary Nicholson House
