= Greenwich Tea Party =

The Greenwich Tea Party was an incident that took place on December 22, 1774, early in the American Revolution, in Greenwich, a small community in Cumberland County, New Jersey, on the Cohansey River. Of the six tea parties during this time, it was the last and the least well-known due to the small size of Greenwich.

== Background ==
Before the Greenwich Tea Party, the Tea Act led to upset among American colonists which led to boycotting and the destruction of tea. Specifically in Greenwich, many colonists viewed boycotting tea as a way to show loyalty to the American cause. The Greyhound was a ship transporting tea that was piloted by Captain J. Allen. Captain Allen decided to change the ship’s course from Philadelphia to Greenwich to avoid possible conflict with colonists in Philadelphia over the ship’s cargo. Once the ship arrived in Greenwich, the tea was stored in Dan Bowen’s cellar, who sympathized with the British. However, Greenwich citizens learned of the tea in Bowen’s cellar, so a meeting was held over what actions to take. They decided on a verdict and, possibly dressed as Native Americans, they broke into the cellar, took the tea, and set it on fire. Some of the tea burners, like Richard and Lewis Howell, were put on trial. However, by the time of the trial, the American Revolution was in full swing and there were not enough loyalists left to indict them.

== Participants ==
One participant of the Greenwich Tea Party was Richard Howell, who would become the third governor of the state of New Jersey and whose granddaughter, Varina Howell, would marry Jefferson Davis, president of the Confederacy. Another known participant was Ebenezer Elmer, who would later become a member of the United States House of Representatives for New Jersey. James Erwin also participated, and he later became the mayor of Trenton, New Jersey. Another participant was Andrew Hunter, who would become a chaplain of the United States Navy. 16 other participants also served in the military during the American Revolution.

== Commemoration ==
In 1908, the Cumberland County Historical Society erected a monument to mark the event, which is located at Main Street at Market Square in Greenwich Township. It is likely that the names on the monument aren’t entirely accurate. They were recalled by Ebenezer Elmer, who participated in the tea burning. However, when he recalled the list of names he was in his 80s, and the tea burning had taken place around 60 years before. The citizens of Greenwich feel a lot of pride in the event and the patriotism it represents. There have been reenactments of the tea burning, and there is an annual charity 5k run titled the Tea Burner Race. On September 27 and 28, 2008, there was a weekend celebration of the 100th anniversary of the monument.

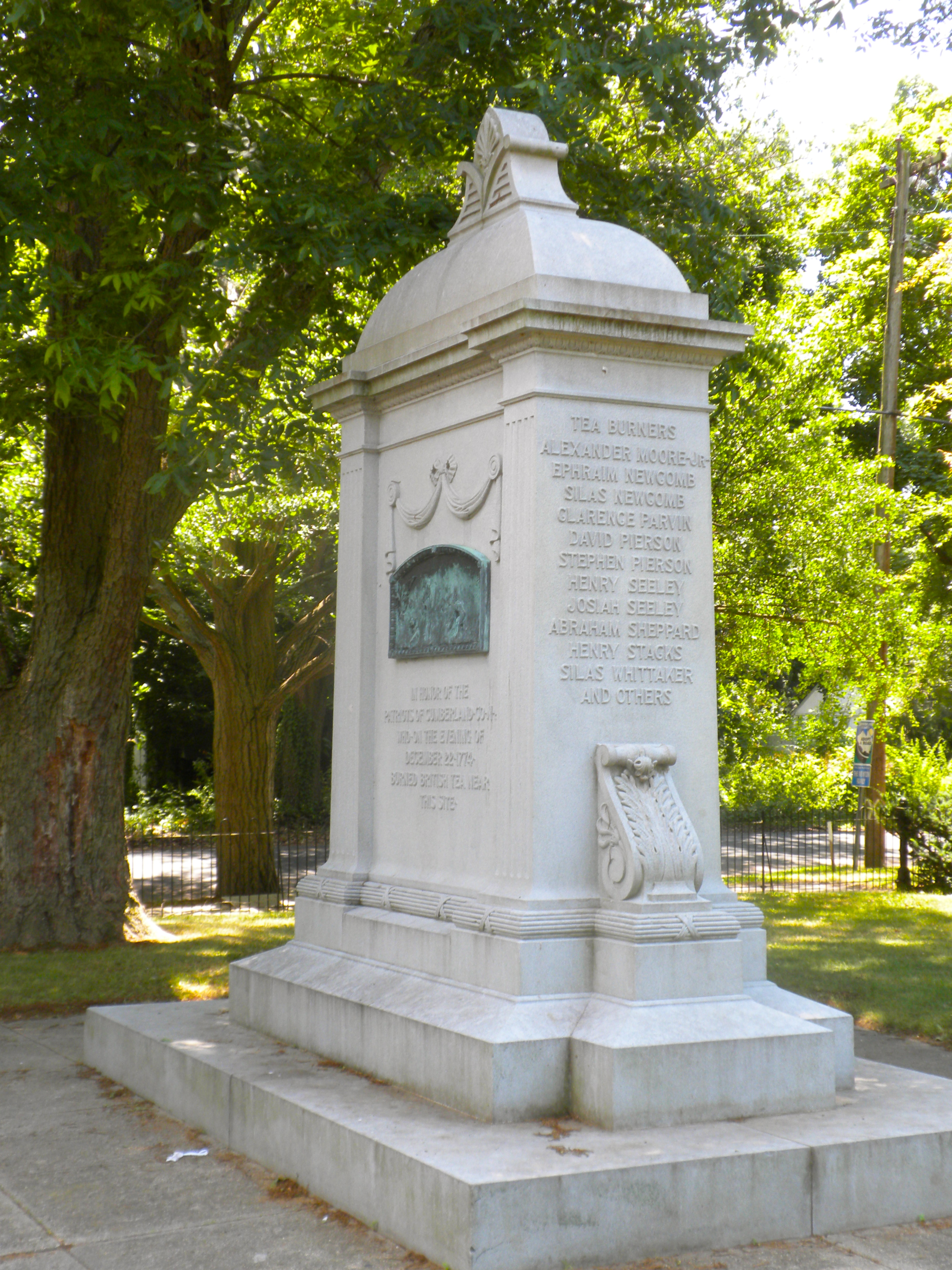
Greenwich Tea Burning Monument
