= Dante's Inferno (ride) =

Ride at Astroland

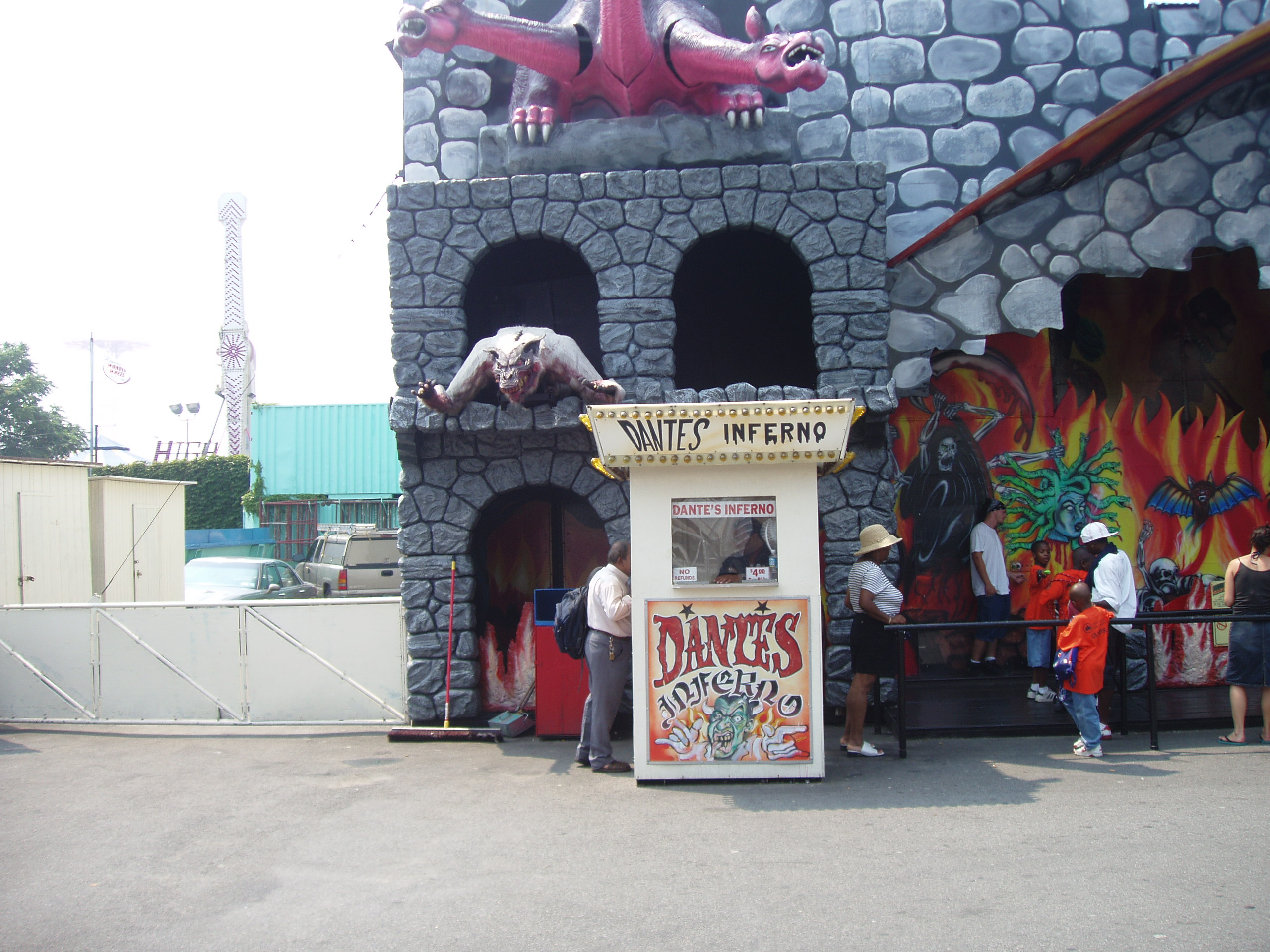
Dante's Inferno at Astroland

Dante's Inferno was a dark ride, Haunted attraction created in 1971 by Anton Schwarzkopf that was located at Astroland on Coney Island; a similar ride, Dante's Dungeon (originally also called Dante's Inferno), is at Morey's Piers in Wildwood, New Jersey. Dante's Inferno is decorated with a purple Cerberus in each tower, a werewolf out of one window, and skeleton warriors in another, its exterior's centerpiece is a large devil holding a victim in his hand that is connecting to the tongue of an upside-down, lolling eyed creature, and a pitchfork in the other. The ride's exterior resembles a castle, and its open area is decorated in graffiti style artwork including Medusa's severed head held by a Grim Reaper, as well as a mad scientist and several dragons.

The passenger rides in a bumper car-like device and is sent through a maze of dark hallways. Most of the interior imagery is behind glass cases, including a dead woman rising off a table, a shaking mummy case, two gorillas, a werewolf popping out from behind foliage, skeletons, and various other horrors, in particular, scenes of a violent and gruesome nature such as a circular saw dismemberment and a man bound on all four limbs begging for help. Suspense is built by relatively long passages of nothing but darkness, strobes that simulate lightning, and sound effects, such as screaming, though some of these are lined with small, impish wall tiles. Little direct influence of Dante Alighieri's Inferno is to be found, though this was not always the case. The ride seems to have no particular theme in its current state. Across from the first gorilla is an unlit display showing a man with a crown opening a window, which appears irrelevant to a horror-themed ride.

The ride has elements similar to a roller coaster, including hard-whipping turns and, midway through the ride, coming outside and being pulled down a steep slope before being plummeted through another set of doors to more horrors. Early in the ride, one specter is lowered before the tracks, but otherwise there is glass (or in the case of the begging man, mesh) between the rider and the various scares. Unlike either the Ghost Hole or the Spook-a-Rama, the other Coney Island dark rides, nothing comes directly at the rider, or threatens to do so.

The ride lasts one minute and forty-five seconds. The admission price was $5.00 at the time Astroland closed.

The ride is portable, but its fate is unclear as Astroland closed after the 2008 season. It may be among the rides Astroland's owners have managed to sell for relocation elsewhere on the boardwalk. As of April 2009, the ride had been gutted. The entire façade was removed, leaving the ramp as part of the standing structure. This was removed before the opening of the new Dreamland Park. In 2009, the site housed a giant snake freak show attraction. It was the only one of the three Coney Island dark rides to have snakes (not real) on the interior, although they were trim to the mummy display. In 2010, the area was renamed Luna Park and a small rollercoaster is in the area where Dante's Inferno was.

== See also ==
- Ghost Hole
- Spook-a-Rama
