= Deno's Wonder Wheel Amusement Park =

Amusement park in Brooklyn, New York

- Previously known as Ward's Kiddie Park

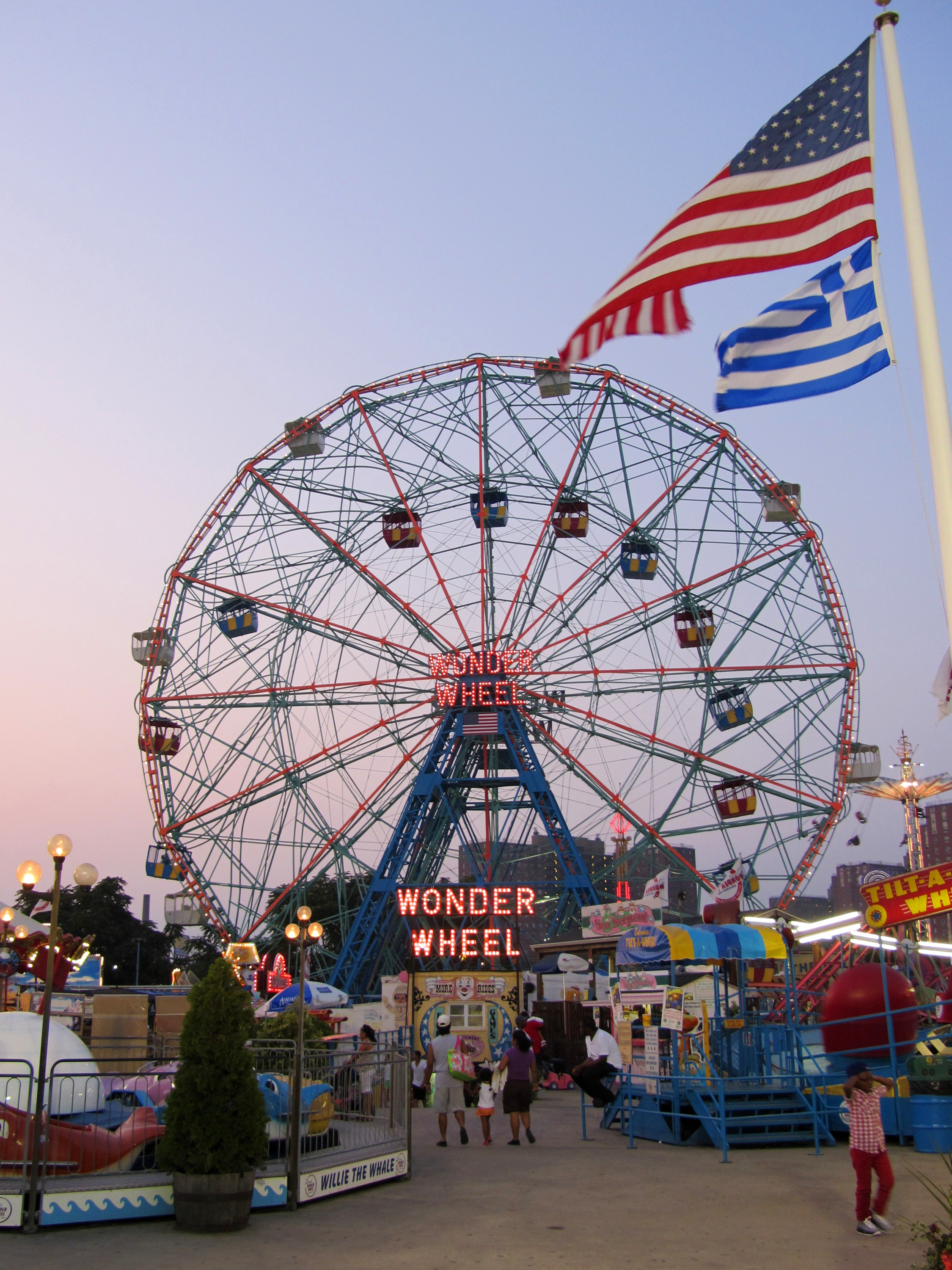
- Interactive map of Deno's Wonder Wheel Amusement Park
- Location: Coney Island, New York, United States
- Coordinates: 40.574310°N 73.979182°W
- Public transit: Coney Island–Stillwell Avenue; West Eighth Street–New York Aquarium
- Opened: 1920 (Wonder Wheel); 1950 (other rides)
- Owner: Dennis Vourderis and Steve Vourderis

Attractions
- Total: 22
- Roller coasters: 3
- Website: http://www.denoswonderwheel.com/

Deno's Wonder Wheel Amusement Park is a family-owned amusement park located at Coney Island, Brooklyn, New York City. It features six adult rides and 16 kiddie rides, including a dozen family rides that parents and children can ride together. The park is named for its main attraction, the Wonder Wheel, a 150-foot (46 m) eccentric wheel built in 1920.

The park overlooks the Atlantic Ocean and Riegelmann Boardwalk along the Coney Island beach. The Wonder Wheel was made a New York City designated landmark by the New York City Landmarks Preservation Commission in 1989.

== History ==
The 150-foot-tall (46 m) Wonder Wheel predates the park, having opened in 1920. It was designed by Charles Hermann, and created and built by Herman Garms in 1918-1920 by the Eccentric Ferris Wheel Company. Until the construction of the 250-foot-tall (76 m) Parachute Jump, it was the tallest attraction in Coney Island. It was a stand-alone attraction operated by Herman Garms. In 1955, Garms built Spook-a-Rama, an indoor dark ride.

Near these two attractions, Denos Vourderis opened a restaurant called the Anchor Bar & Grill. Also, next door to the Wonder Wheel, stood a small kiddie amusement park called Ward's Kiddie Park owned by John Curran. That area was built in 1950. Denos opened up a concession stand there in 1970. In 1976, Denos bought the kiddie amusement park from Curran. In 1983, Denos acquired the Wonder Wheel and Spook-a-Rama from Fred Garms and Walter Kerner Sr. Today the park still has predominantly children's rides along with several family attractions. Since Denos's death in 1994, the park has been operated by his two sons, Dennis and Steve.

In January 2020, Deno's Amusement Park announced a major expansion to coincide with the 100th anniversary of the Wonder Wheel. The expanded park would take over part of the abandoned West 12th Street amusement area, shuttered since 2017. The Vourderis family paid $6 million for the land and another $5.5 million for an unnamed ride. However, due to the COVID-19 pandemic in New York City, the park did not open for the 2020 season, and the expansion was delayed. A Vekoma Suspended Family Coaster called Phoenix soft-opened on June 26, 2021, with a full opening on July 1. Also open in 2021 is Sky Flyer, a micro coaster from SBF Visa Group, which Deno's had purchased at the 2019 IAAPA Expo.

== Attractions ==
Currently Operating
- Big Trucks
- Boats
- Carousel
- Dizzy Dragon
- Fire Engines
- Jets
- Jump Around
- Jumping Motorcycles
- Phoenix - a Vekoma Suspended Family Coaster
- Pony Carts
- Rio Grande Train
- Samba
- Sea Serpent Roller Coaster - a E&F Miler Industries kiddy coaster
- Sky Flyer
- Speedway
- Tilt-A-Whirl
- Twist and Shout (2015)
- Bumper Cars (2012 Formerly Astroland)
- Spook-a-Rama
- Wonder Wheel
- Thunderbolt - a Chance Rides alpine bobs
- Triotech XD

Formerly Attractions

- Dragon (Zamperla powered coaster)
- Duck Parade
- Elephant (Zamperla)
- Freefall (Moser)
- High Flyer (Replace Super Shot)
- Mini Enterprise (Replace Samba)
- Mini Pirate Ship
- Red Baron
- Scooter (Replace Astroland Bumper Cars)
- Scrambler (Formerly Astroland 2015 and Removed in 2016)
- Spin the Apples (Replace Dizzy Dragons)
- Super Shot (Removed in 2008)
- Willie the Whales
