= Sunset Lake (New Jersey) =

Reservoir in the United States

- Location within New Jersey Location within the United States
- Location: Cumberland County, near Bridgeton, New Jersey
- Coordinates: 39°26′48″N 75°14′11″W
- Type: Reservoir
- Basin countries: United States
- Surface elevation: 10 ft (3.0 m)

Sunset Lake is a medium-sized reservoir located in and near the city of Bridgeton in southern New Jersey (Cumberland County). The reservoir lies mostly in Hopewell Township and Upper Deerfield Township, with a small portion within the Bridgeton city limits. The lake was created by damming the Cohansey River less than one mile upstream from the river's head of tide. The dam is located next to Park Drive, a major roadway that cuts throughout the city's park system and connects with Route 49. Originally, the lake was known as "Tumbling Dam Pond".

The neighborhood of Sunset Lake is to the northeast of the lake in Upper Deerfield Township.

== Sunset Lake (present day) ==
Sunset Lake is home to canoe rentals and a swimming beach (Stony Point Beach) operated by the City of Bridgeton Department of Recreation. The lake also offers picnic areas, a boat ramp (public access to Sunset Lake is provided from the Bridgeton City Park, just off County Road 607) at Piney Point (a peninsula that juts out into the lake), and opportunities for fishing. People can kayak or canoe in the lake and carry their boats across the road to the lake's outflow, the Cohansey River. Another canoeing option is the Raceway, a 19th-century earthen structure that was created as a mill race but since has been converted to recreational use. The Raceway meanders through the Cohanzick Zoo and dead-ends near Downtown Bridgeton (near the Nail House Museum). There is also a stream that one could take that feeds from Mary Elmer Lake (a nearby lake also in the Bridgeton Park System).

== History ==
Sunset Lake was once the home of Tumbling Dam Park, situated at the southeast corner of Sunset Lake in Bridgeton. The park was located on the shore of the lake and started out as a boat rental and pavilion area for picnics during the Victorian era. Eventually the park evolved to include early amusement park rides, like the one built by the local Pretzel Amusement Ride Company, with a bowling alley, baseball fields, and concession stands. Notable celebrities of the time visited Tumbling Dam Park; among them were the Wright Brothers and Annie Oakley. The park was damaged during the Flood of 1934 but was repaired, only later to fall into disrepair in the 1950s. The park was eventually torn down and the land sold to developers who built houses on it.

A derecho storm on August 13, 2011, caused the lake to rise and overflow its banks. Since the storm the spillway dam has been repaired, and the lake is now open and stocked with fish.

== Wildlife ==
Sunset Lake is inhabited by various species of wildlife. Many turtles reside in the lake's waters, including snapping turtles. Geese, ducks, and seagulls are the primary avian residents of the lake area. Aquatic residents include sunfish, catfish, and fresh water clams along with leeches.

== Events ==
The city of Bridgeton hosts events from time to time at Sunset Lake:

- Annual Pig King BBQ
- Annual Triathlon
- Various shows, concerts, and plays conducted at the Amphi-theater
