= Cohansey River =

River in New Jersey, United States

Coordinates: 39.38845°N 75.31539°W

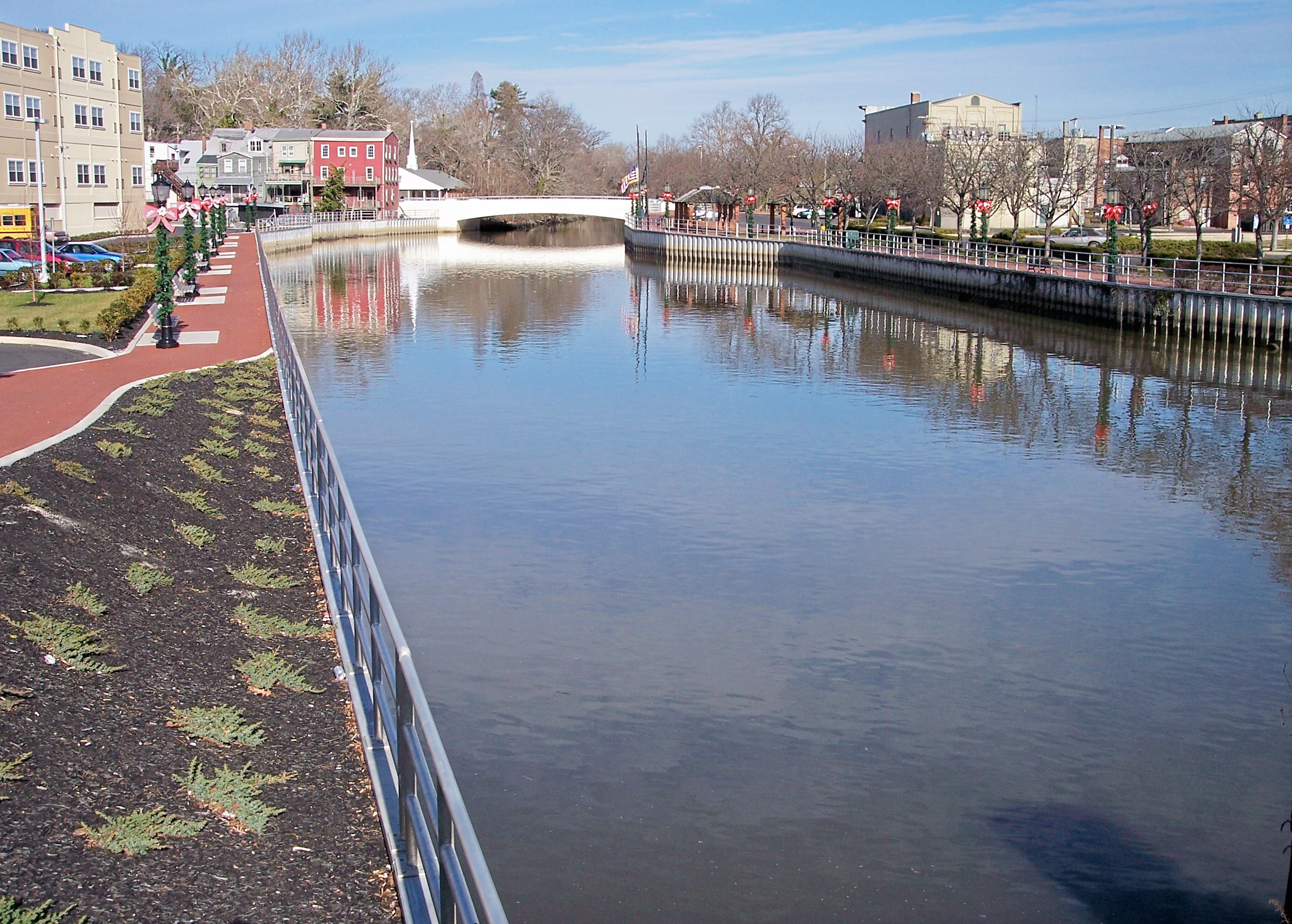
The Cohansey River in Bridgeton in 2006

The Cohansey River, also called Cohansey Creek, is a 30.6-mile-long (49.2 km) river in southern New Jersey of the United States. It drains approximately 108 square miles (280 km^{2}) of rural agricultural and forested lowlands on the north shore of Delaware Bay.

It rises in central Salem County approximately 5 miles (8 km) southeast of Woodstown, and flows south through rural Cumberland County. It flows through Sunset Lake, which is also fed from Mary Elmer Lake, both of which are located in the park system of the city of Bridgeton.

At Bridgeton, the river becomes navigable, although very shallow at low tide: one-foot to a few inches coming through downtown Bridgeton. The city boat ramp downtown is unusable during low tide due to about 20 feet (6 m) of mud between the channel and the ramp. The river widens into a tidal estuary, approximately 10 miles (16 km) long, that flows south, then west, entering Cohansey Cove on Delaware Bay, approximately 7 miles (11 km) southwest of Bridgeton. The mouth of the estuary is surrounded by extensive wetlands and salt marshes.

In colonial times, the river provided an anchorage for vessels approaching Philadelphia. In 1774, the small port village of Greenwich on the river near its mouth was the scene of an incident similar to the more famous Boston Tea Party in which imported tea was burned as a protest against taxation. The river was also known as the Cesaria River in colonial times.

== Navigation and Coast pilot ==
The Cohansey River is in Region 3 of the US Coast Guard and NOAA Mapping system. The following information is reproduced from the US government coast pilot information. This is from the 39th edition and may be out of data, so please do not use this for navigation: Cohansey River, which empties into the northeast side of Delaware Bay 31 miles northwestward of Cape May Light, is used mostly by pleasure craft, although some petroleum is transported to Bridgeton. Cohansey Light (39°20'30"N., 75°21'41"W.), 42 feet above the water, is shown from a black skeleton tower with a white daymark on the south side near the natural entrance. A dredged cut through the narrow neck of land on which the light stands gives a more direct approach to the river; the cut, 0.3 mile northwest of Cohansey Light, is marked on its west side by lights at the inner and outer ends.

The river is unmarked above the dredged cut. In April 1990, the controlling depths were 5 feet to Fairton; thence in 1990-September 2003, shoaling to less than 1 foot to Bridgeton. The usual approach to Cohansey River is along the axis of the dredged cut, but the natural channel eastward of Cohansey Light is sometimes used; the latter has a controlling depth of about 7 feet, and unmarked shoals with depths of 4 to 6 feet must be avoided on either side. Local knowledge is advised when using this approach and in the dredged channel in the upper part of the river off Bridgeton.

== See also ==
- Bridgeton, New Jersey Flood of 1934
- List of New Jersey rivers
- Mahlon Williamson (barque)
