= Hopewell Township School District =

School district in Cumberland County, New Jersey, US

Address
- 122 Sewall Road Hopewell Township, Cumberland County, New Jersey, 08302; United States
- Coordinates: 39.455287°N 75.261734°W

District information
- Grades: K-8
- Superintendent: Meghan Lammersen
- Business administrator: Stephanie Kuntz
- Schools: 1

Students and staff
- Enrollment: 515 (as of 2022–23)
- Faculty: 40.0 FTEs
- Student–teacher ratio: 12.9:1

Other information
- District Factor Group: CD
- Website: Official website
Ind.	Per pupil	District spending	Rank (*)	K-8 average	%± vs. average
1A	Total Spending	$15,656	8	$18,891	−17.1%
1	Budgetary Cost	12,990	17	14,159	−8.3%
2	Classroom Instruction	8,567	32	8,659	−1.1%
6	Support Services	1,490	8	2,167	−31.2%
8	Administrative Cost	1,090	2	1,547	−29.5%
10	Operations & Maintenance	1,742	44	1,612	8.1%
13	Extracurricular Activities	102	25	104	−1.9%
16	Median Teacher Salary	65,536	43	61,136
Data from NJDoE 2014 Taxpayers' Guide to Education Spending. *Of K-8 districts with 401-750 students. Lowest spending=1; Highest=64

The Hopewell Township School District is a community public school district that serves students in kindergarten through eighth grade from Hopewell Township and Shiloh, in Cumberland County, in the U.S. state of New Jersey.

As of the 2022–23 school year, the district, comprised of one school, had an enrollment of 515 students and 40.0 classroom teachers (on an FTE basis), for a student–teacher ratio of 12.9:1.

The district is classified by the New Jersey Department of Education as being in District Factor Group "CD", the sixth-highest of eight groupings. District Factor Groups organize districts statewide to allow comparison by common socioeconomic characteristics of the local districts. From lowest socioeconomic status to highest, the categories are A, B, CD, DE, FG, GH, I and J.

Public school students from both communities in ninth through twelfth grades attend Cumberland Regional High School, which also serves students from Deerfield Township, Fairfield Township, Greenwich Township, Stow Creek Township and Upper Deerfield Township. As of the 2022–23 school year, the high school had an enrollment of 1,124 students and 82.0 classroom teachers (on an FTE basis), for a student–teacher ratio of 13.7:1.

== History ==
The Shiloh School was closed after the end of the 2006-07 school year, and all students from Shiloh are being sent to the Hopewell Crest School as part of a sending/receiving relationship, accounting for nearly 10% of the Hopewell district's enrollment.

== School ==
Hopewell Crest School had an enrollment of 496 students in grades PreK-8 as of the 2020–21 school year.

== Administration ==
Core members of the district's administration are:

- Meghan Lammersen, superintendent
- Stephanie Kuntz, business administrator and board secretary

== Board of education ==
The district's board of education is comprised of nine members who set policy and oversee the fiscal and educational operation of the district through its administration. As a Type II school district, the board's trustees are elected directly by voters to serve three-year terms of office on a staggered basis, with three seats up for election each year held (since 2012) as part of the November general election. The board appoints a superintendent to oversee the district's day-to-day operations and a business administrator to supervise the business functions of the district.
