= Gandys Beach, New Jersey =

Populated place in Cumberland County, New Jersey, US

- Census-designated place
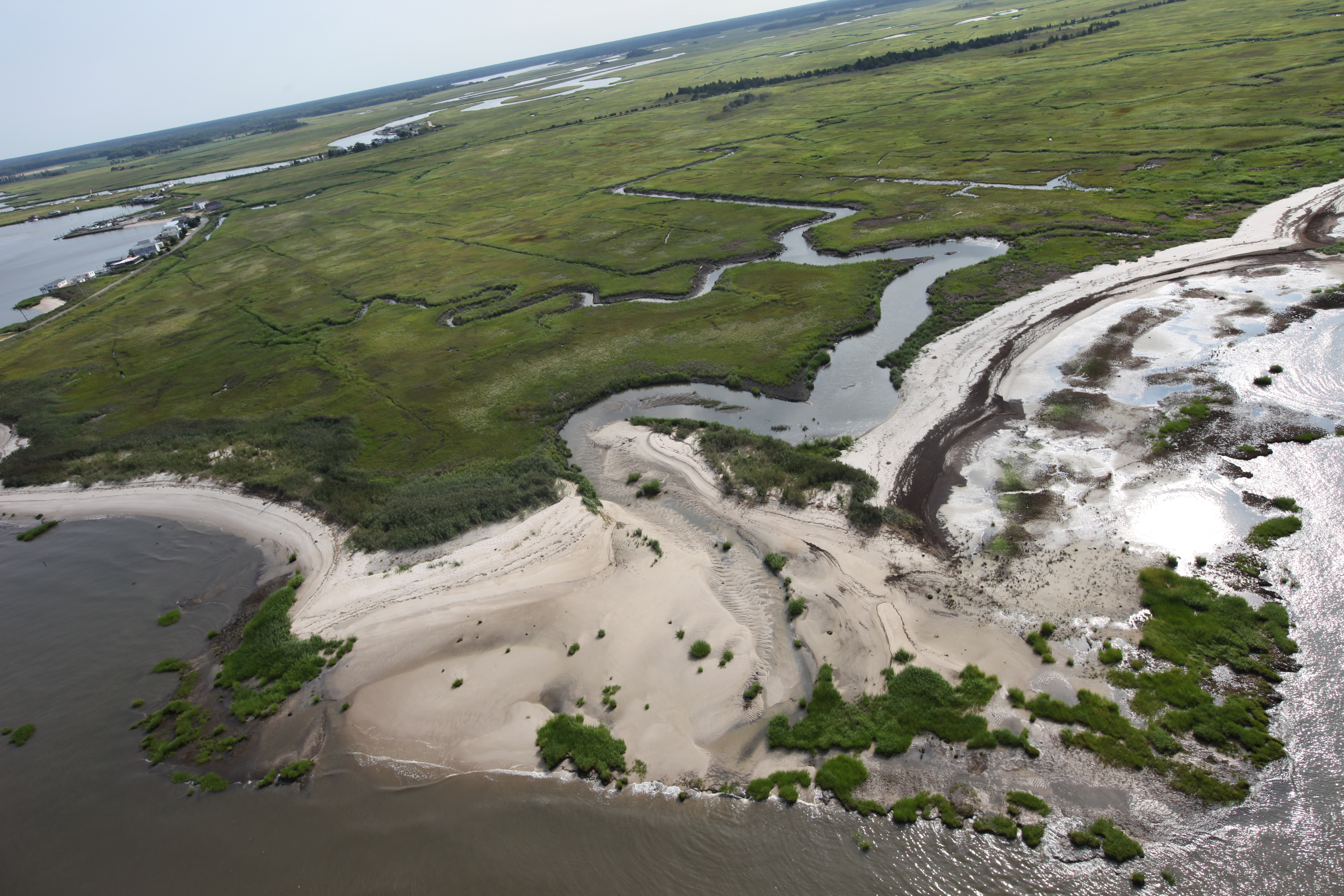
- Beach at Gandys Beach

- Location in Cumberland County Location in New Jersey Location in the United States
- Coordinates: 39°16′17″N 75°13′51″W
- Country: United States
- State: New Jersey
- County: Cumberland
- Township: Downe

Area
  - Total: 0.097 sq mi (0.25 km^{2})
  - Land: 0.097 sq mi (0.25 km^{2})
  - Water: 0 sq mi (0.00 km^{2})
- Elevation: 5 ft (1.5 m)

Population (2020)
  - Total: 25
  - Density: 262/sq mi (101.3/km^{2})
- Time zone: UTC−05:00 (Eastern (EST))
  - Summer (DST): UTC−04:00 (EDT)
- ZIP Code: 08345 (Newport)
- Area code: 856
- FIPS code: 34-25590
- GNIS feature ID: 2806086

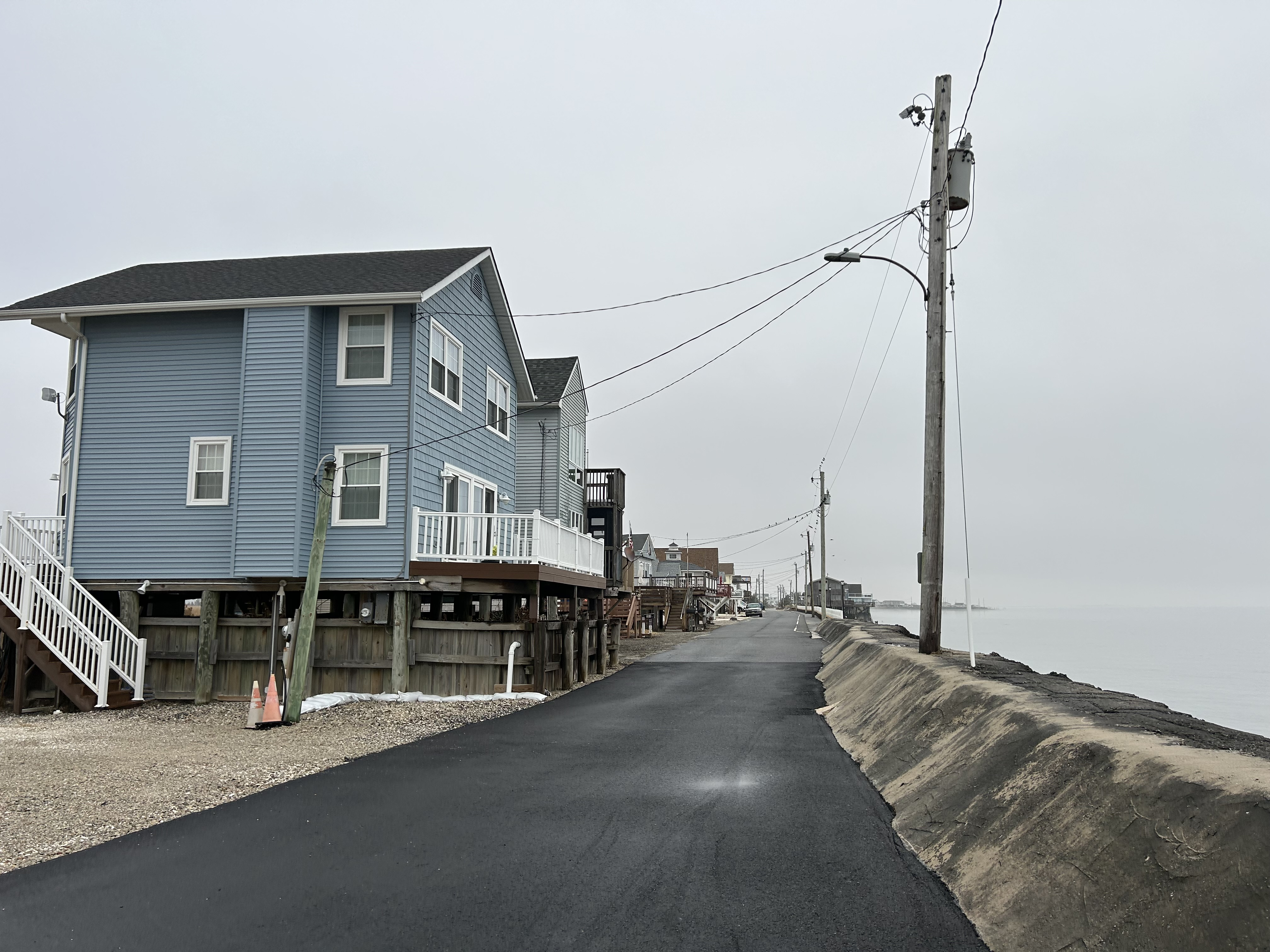
Houses along Cove Road, the only road in Gandys Beach, in December 2024

Gandys Beach is a census-designated place (CDP) located in Cumberland County, in the U.S. state of New Jersey. It is in the southwestern part of the county, in the western part of Downe Township, on the shore of Delaware Bay. It is 5 miles (8 km) southwest of Newport and 16 miles (26 km) southwest of Millville.

Gandys Beach was first listed as a CDP prior to the 2020 census. As of the 2020 census, Gandys Beach had a population of 25.

== Demographics ==
Historical population
Census	Pop.	Note	%±
2020	25		—
U.S. Decennial Census; 2020

Gandys Beach first appeared as a census designated place in the 2020 U.S. census.

Gandys Beach CDP, New Jersey – Racial and ethnic composition Note: the US Census treats Hispanic/Latino as an ethnic category. This table excludes Latinos from the racial categories and assigns them to a separate category. Hispanics/Latinos may be of any race.
Race / Ethnicity (NH = Non-Hispanic)	Pop 2020	2020
White alone (NH)	25	100.00%
Black or African American alone (NH)	0	0.00%
Native American or Alaska Native alone (NH)	0	0.00%
Asian alone (NH)	0	0.00%
Native Hawaiian or Pacific Islander alone (NH)	0	0.00%
Other race alone (NH)	0	0.00%
Mixed race or Multiracial (NH)	0	0.00%
Hispanic or Latino (any race)	0	0.00%
Total	25	100.00%

As of 2020, the area had a population of 25.

== Education ==
It is in the Downe Township School District.
