= Downe Township, New Jersey =

Township in Cumberland County, New Jersey, US

- Township
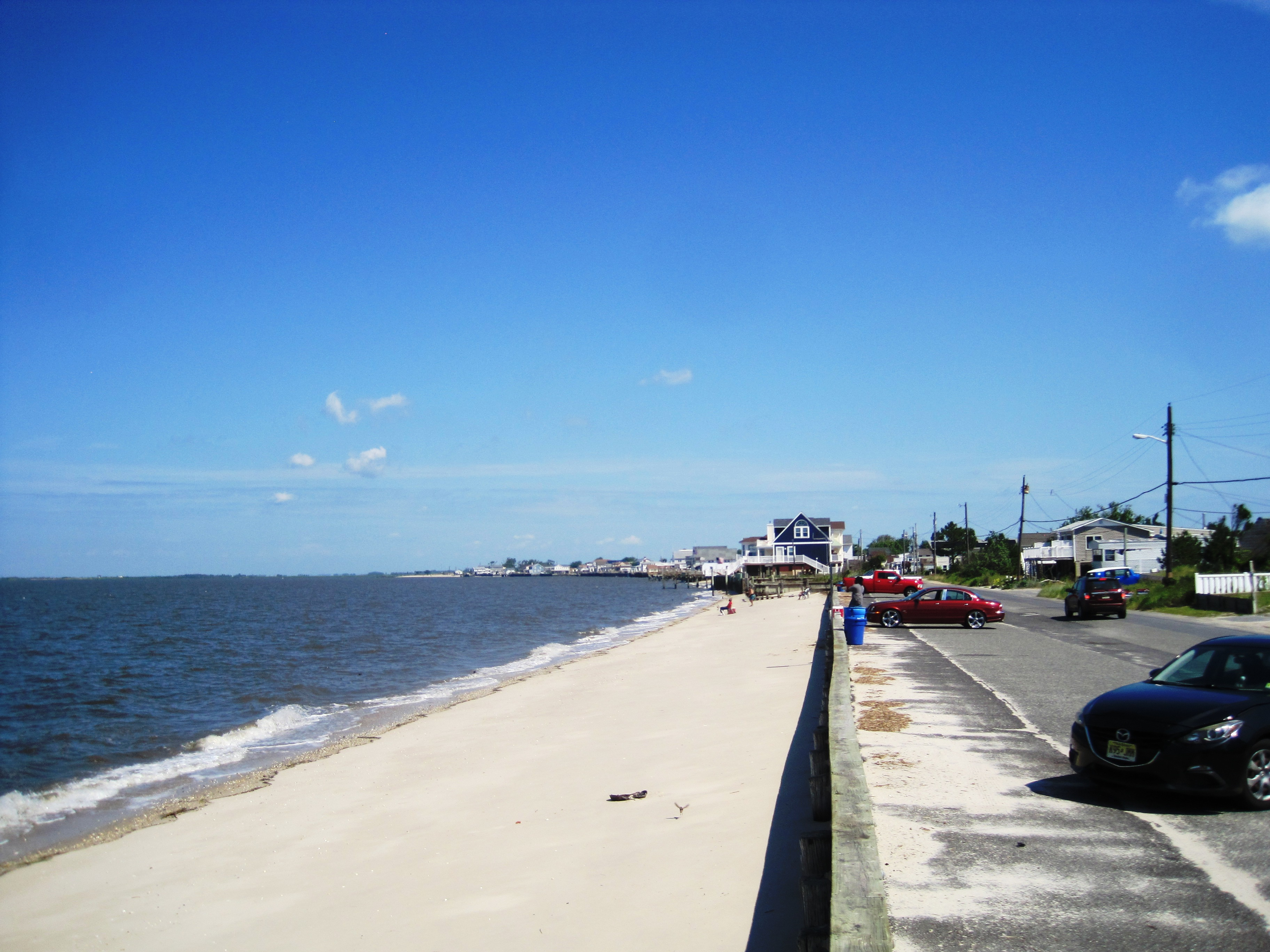
- Fortescue Beach in Downe Township

- Seal

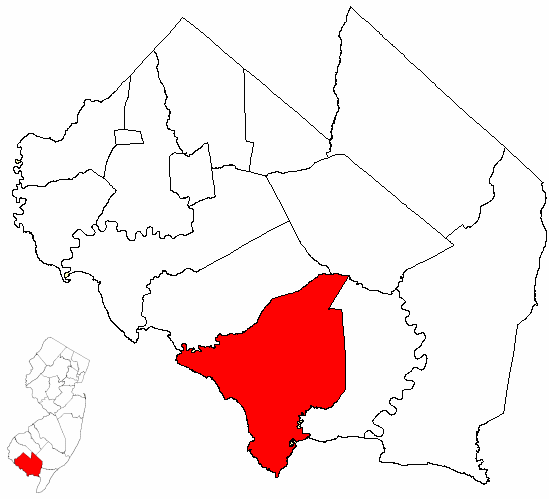
- Location of Downe Township in Cumberland County highlighted in red (right). Inset map: Location of Cumberland County in New Jersey highlighted in red (left).

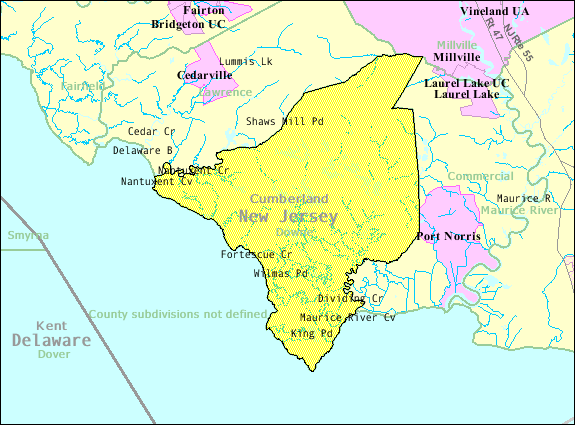
- Census Bureau map of Downe Township, New Jersey

- Location in Cumberland County Location in New Jersey Location in the United States
- Coordinates: 39.269497°N 75.133318°W
- Country: United States
- State: New Jersey
- County: Cumberland
- Royal charter: January 19, 1748
- Incorporated: February 21, 1798

Government
  - Type: Township
  - Body: Township Committee
  - Mayor: Michael L. Rothman (R, term ends December 31, 2026)
  - Municipal clerk: Nadine E. Lockley

Area
  - Total: 54.26 sq mi (140.54 km^{2})
  - Land: 48.40 sq mi (125.36 km^{2})
  - Water: 5.86 sq mi (15.18 km^{2}) 10.80%
  - Rank: 30th of 565 in state 3rd of 14 in county
- Elevation: 0 ft (0 m)

Population (2020)
  - Total: 1,399
  - Estimate (2023): 1,382
  - Rank: 517th of 565 in state 11th of 14 in county
  - Density: 28.9/sq mi (11.2/km^{2})
  - Rank: 560th of 565 in state 14th of 14 in county
- Time zone: UTC−05:00 (Eastern (EST))
  - Summer (DST): UTC−04:00 (Eastern (EDT))
- ZIP Code: 08315 – Dividing Creek; 08321 – Fortescue; 08345 – Newport; 08349 – Port Norris, New Jersey
- Area code: 856 exchange: 785
- FIPS code: 3401118220
- GNIS feature ID: 0882061
- Website: www.downetwpnj.org

Downe Township is a township in Cumberland County, in the U.S. state of New Jersey. It is part of the Vineland-Bridgeton metropolitan statistical area for statistical purposes. As of the 2020 United States census, the township's population was 1,399, a decrease of 186 (−11.7%) from the 2010 census count of 1,585, which in turn reflected decline of 46 (−2.8%) from the 1,631 counted in the 2000 census.

What is now Downe Township was formed by Royal charter on January 19, 1748, as Downes Township, from portions of Fairfield Township. Downe Township was incorporated as one of New Jersey's initial 104 townships by an act of the New Jersey Legislature on February 21, 1798. Portions of the township were taken to form Commercial Township on February 27, 1874. Downe Township is a dry township where alcohol is not allowed to be sold by law.

== Geography ==
According to the U.S. Census Bureau, Downe Township had a total area of 54.26 square miles (140.54 km^{2}), including 48.40 square miles (125.36 km^{2}) of land and 5.86 square miles (15.18 km^{2}) of water (10.80%).

Unincorporated communities, localities and place names located partially or completely within the township include Beadons Point, Beaver Dam, Dividing Creek, Dragston, Egg Island Point, False Egg Island Point, Fortescue, Gandys Beach, Little Neck, Money Island (surrounded by the Gandy's Beach nature preserve), Nantuxent Point, Newport, Newport Landing, Newport Neck, Newport Station, Shaws Mill, The Glades and Turkey Point.

Fortescue was once known as the "weakfish capital of the world", though the population of the fish has sharply declined, sharply impacting the economic vitality of the area.

The township borders the Cumberland County municipalities of Commercial Township, Lawrence Township and Millville, along with the Delaware Bay.

== Demographics ==
Historical population
Census	Pop.	Note	%±
1810	1,501		—
1820	1,749		16.5%
1830	1,923		9.9%
1840	1,920		−0.2%
1850	2,341		21.9%
1860	3,114		33.0%
1870	3,385		8.7%
1880	1,687	*	−50.2%
1890	1,793		6.3%
1900	1,833		2.2%
1910	1,519		−17.1%
1920	1,322		−13.0%
1930	1,574		19.1%
1940	1,546		−1.8%
1950	1,786		15.5%
1960	1,870		4.7%
1970	1,777		−5.0%
1980	1,803		1.5%
1990	1,702		−5.6%
2000	1,631		−4.2%
2010	1,585		−2.8%
2020	1,399		−11.7%
2023 (est.)	1,382		−1.2%
Population sources: 1810–2000; 1810–1920 1840 1850–1870; 1850 1870 1880–1890; 1890–1910 1910–1930; 1940–2000 2000; 2010 2020 * = Lost territory in previous decade

=== 2010 census ===
The 2010 United States census counted 1,585 people, 646 households, and 435 families in the township. The population density was 32.6 per square mile (12.6/km^{2}). There were 996 housing units at an average density of 20.5 per square mile (7.9/km^{2}). The racial makeup was 92.62% (1,468) White, 2.59% (41) Black or African American, 0.50% (8) Native American, 0.25% (4) Asian, 0.00% (0) Pacific Islander, 1.64% (26) from other races, and 2.40% (38) from two or more races. Hispanic or Latino of any race were 3.85% (61) of the population.

Of the 646 households, 21.8% had children under the age of 18; 52.0% were married couples living together; 8.5% had a female householder with no husband present and 32.7% were non-families. Of all households, 24.9% were made up of individuals and 13.3% had someone living alone who was 65 years of age or older. The average household size was 2.45 and the average family size was 2.93.

19.6% of the population were under the age of 18, 6.5% from 18 to 24, 20.3% from 25 to 44, 33.2% from 45 to 64, and 20.4% who were 65 years of age or older. The median age was 47.6 years. For every 100 females, the population had 97.9 males. For every 100 females ages 18 and older there were 98.6 males.

The Census Bureau's 2006–2010 American Community Survey showed that (in 2010 inflation-adjusted dollars) median household income was $45,250 (with a margin of error of +/− $5,437) and the median family income was $49,471 (+/− $9,499). Males had a median income of $36,739 (+/− $5,543) versus $32,841 (+/− $8,768) for females. The per capita income for the borough was $20,428 (+/− $2,019). About 6.7% of families and 14.9% of the population were below the poverty line, including 16.5% of those under age 18 and 13.0% of those age 65 or over.

=== 2000 census ===
As of the 2000 U.S. census, there were 1,631 people, 658 households, and 438 families residing in the township. The population density was 32.1 inhabitants per square mile (12.4/km^{2}). There were 1,134 housing units at an average density of 22.3 per square mile (8.6/km^{2}). The racial makeup of the township was 91.05% White, 4.84% African American, 1.47% Native American, 0.18% Asian, 0.98% from other races, and 1.47% from two or more races. Hispanic or Latino of any race were 3.37% of the population.

There were 658 households, out of which 26.6% had children under the age of 18 living with them, 51.1% were married couples living together, 10.3% had a female householder with no husband present, and 33.3% were non-families. 27.4% of all households were made up of individuals, and 14.3% had someone living alone who was 65 years of age or older. The average household size was 2.48 and the average family size was 3.03.

In the township, the population was spread out, with 23.5% under the age of 18, 6.3% from 18 to 24, 24.2% from 25 to 44, 27.0% from 45 to 64, and 18.9% who were 65 years of age or older. The median age was 42 years. For every 100 females, there were 107.8 males. For every 100 females age 18 and over, there were 96.7 males.

The median income for a household in the township was $34,667, and the median income for a family was $39,375. Males had a median income of $35,000 versus $26,397 for females. The per capita income for the township was $17,366. About 11.5% of families and 13.1% of the population were below the poverty line, including 21.1% of those under age 18 and 14.4% of those age 65 or over.

== Government ==
=== Local government ===
Downe Township is governed under the Township form of New Jersey municipal government, one of 141 municipalities (of the 564) statewide that use this form, the second-most commonly used form of government in the state. The Township Committee is comprised of five members, who are elected directly by the voters at-large in partisan elections to serve three-year terms of office on a staggered basis, with either one or two seats coming up for election each year as part of the November general election in a three-year cycle. At an annual reorganization meeting, the Township Committee selects one of its members to serve as Mayor and another to serve as Deputy Mayor.

As of 2025, members of the Downe Township Committee are Mayor Michael L. Rothman (R, term on committee and as mayor ends December 31, 2025), Deputy Mayor Larry Jordan Sr. (R, term on committee and as deputy mayor ends 2025), Edward Bart (R, 2026), Stephen Byrne (R, 2026) and Robert Campbell (R, 2027).

=== Federal, state and county representation ===
Downe Township is located in the 2nd Congressional District and is part of New Jersey's 1st state legislative district.

For the 119th United States Congress, New Jersey's 2nd congressional district is represented by Jeff Van Drew (R, Dennis Township). New Jersey is represented in the United States Senate by Democrats Cory Booker (Newark, term ends 2027) and Andy Kim (Moorestown, term ends 2031).

For the 2026–2027 session, the 1st legislative district of the New Jersey Legislature is represented in the State Senate by Mike Testa (R, Vineland) and in the General Assembly by Antwan McClellan (R, Ocean City) and Erik K. Simonsen (R, Lower Township).

Cumberland County is governed by a Board of County Commissioners composed of seven members who are elected at large by the citizens of Cumberland County in partisan elections and serve staggered three-year terms in office, with either two or three seats coming up for election each year in a three-year cycle. Annually, the seven board members select a Director and Deputy Director for one-year terms. As of 2025, members of the Cumberland County Board of County Commissioners (with party affiliation, residence and term-end year listed in parentheses) are:

Douglas A. Albrecht (R, Vineland, 2025), Deputy Director Antonio Romero (R, Vineland, 2027), Sandra Taylor (R, Downe Township; 2026), Victoria Groetsch-Lods (R, Vineland, 2025), Arthur Marchand (R, Hopewell Township, 2026), James Sauro (R, Vineland, 2026) and Robert A. Austino (D, Bridgeton, 2027).

The county's constitutional officers are: Clerk Celeste Riley (D, Bridgeton, 2029), Sheriff Michael Donato (R, Bridgeton, 2026) and Surrogate Rudolph Luisi (R, Vineland, 2028).

=== Politics ===
As of March 2011, there were a total of 1,128 registered voters in Downe Township, of which 249 (22.1%) were registered as Democrats, 484 (42.9%) were registered as Republicans and 394 (34.9%) were registered as Unaffiliated. There was one voter registered to another party.

Gubernatorial election results for Downe Township
Year	Republican		Democratic		Third party(ies)	
Year	No.	%	No.	%	No.	%
2025	410	71.80%	159	27.85%	2	0.35%
2021	400	72.60%	145	26.32%	6	1.09%
2017	250	60.83%	145	35.28%	16	3.89%
2013	353	73.39%	113	23.49%	15	3.12%
2009	306	53.87%	189	33.27%	73	12.85%
2005	281	53.12%	217	41.02%	31	5.86%

In the 2012 presidential election, Republican Mitt Romney received 58.8% of the vote (415 cast), ahead of Democrat Barack Obama with 39.1% (276 votes), and other candidates with 2.1% (15 votes), among the 715 ballots cast by the township's 1,172 registered voters (9 ballots were spoiled), for a turnout of 61.0%. In the 2008 presidential election, Republican John McCain received 56.7% of the vote (447 cast), ahead of Democrat Barack Obama, who received 38.1% (300 votes), with 788 ballots cast among the township's 1,127 registered voters, for a turnout of 69.9%. In the 2004 presidential election, Republican George W. Bush received 59.1% of the vote (445 ballots cast), outpolling Democrat John Kerry, who received 38.9% (293 votes), with 753 ballots cast among the township's 1,071 registered voters, for a turnout percentage of 70.3.

United States presidential election results for Downe Township 2024 2020 2016 2012 2008 2004
Year	Republican		Democratic		Third party(ies)	
Year	No.	%	No.	%	No.	%
2024	553	74.73%	183	24.73%	4	0.54%
2020	568	71.81%	214	27.05%	9	1.14%
2016	542	76.55%	143	20.20%	23	3.25%
2012	415	58.78%	276	39.09%	15	2.12%
2008	447	56.73%	300	38.07%	41	5.20%
2004	445	59.10%	293	38.91%	15	1.99%

In the 2013 gubernatorial election, Republican Chris Christie received 73.4% of the vote (353 cast), ahead of Democrat Barbara Buono with 23.5% (113 votes), and other candidates with 3.1% (15 votes), among the 502 ballots cast by the township's 1,072 registered voters (21 ballots were spoiled), for a turnout of 46.8%. In the 2009 gubernatorial election, Republican Chris Christie received 51.7% of the vote (306 ballots cast), ahead of both Democrat Jon Corzine with 31.9% (189 votes) and Independent Chris Daggett with 9.8% (58 votes), with 592 ballots cast among the township's 1,127 registered voters, yielding a 52.5% turnout.

United States Senate election results for Downe Township1
Year	Republican		Democratic		Third party(ies)	
Year	No.	%	No.	%	No.	%
2024	495	71.84%	177	25.69%	17	2.47%
2018	399	71.89%	131	23.60%	25	4.50%
2012	334	53.87%	274	44.19%	12	1.94%
2006	321	54.87%	232	39.66%	32	5.47%

United States Senate election results for Downe Township2
Year	Republican		Democratic		Third party(ies)	
Year	No.	%	No.	%	No.	%
2020	529	68.79%	226	29.39%	14	1.82%
2014	254	61.50%	149	36.08%	10	2.42%
2013	186	69.66%	78	29.21%	3	1.12%
2008	374	54.68%	277	40.50%	33	4.82%

== Education ==
The Downe Township School District serves public school students in pre-kindergarten through eighth grade at Downe Township School. As of the 2018–19 school year, the district, comprised of one school, had an enrollment of 186 students and 17.0 classroom teachers (on an FTE basis), for a student–teacher ratio of 10.9:1. In the 2016–17 school year, Downe had the 38th smallest enrollment of any school district in the state, with 185 students.

Public school students in ninth through twelfth grades attend Bridgeton High School in Bridgeton, as part of a sending/receiving relationship with the Bridgeton Public Schools. As of the 2018–19 school year, the high school had an enrollment of 1,404 students and 112.0 classroom teachers (on an FTE basis), for a student–teacher ratio of 12.5:1.

Students are also eligible to attend Cumberland County Technical Education Center in Vineland, serving students from the entire county in its full-time technical training programs, which are offered without charge to students, paid for by tax dollars of those who are county residents.

== Transportation ==
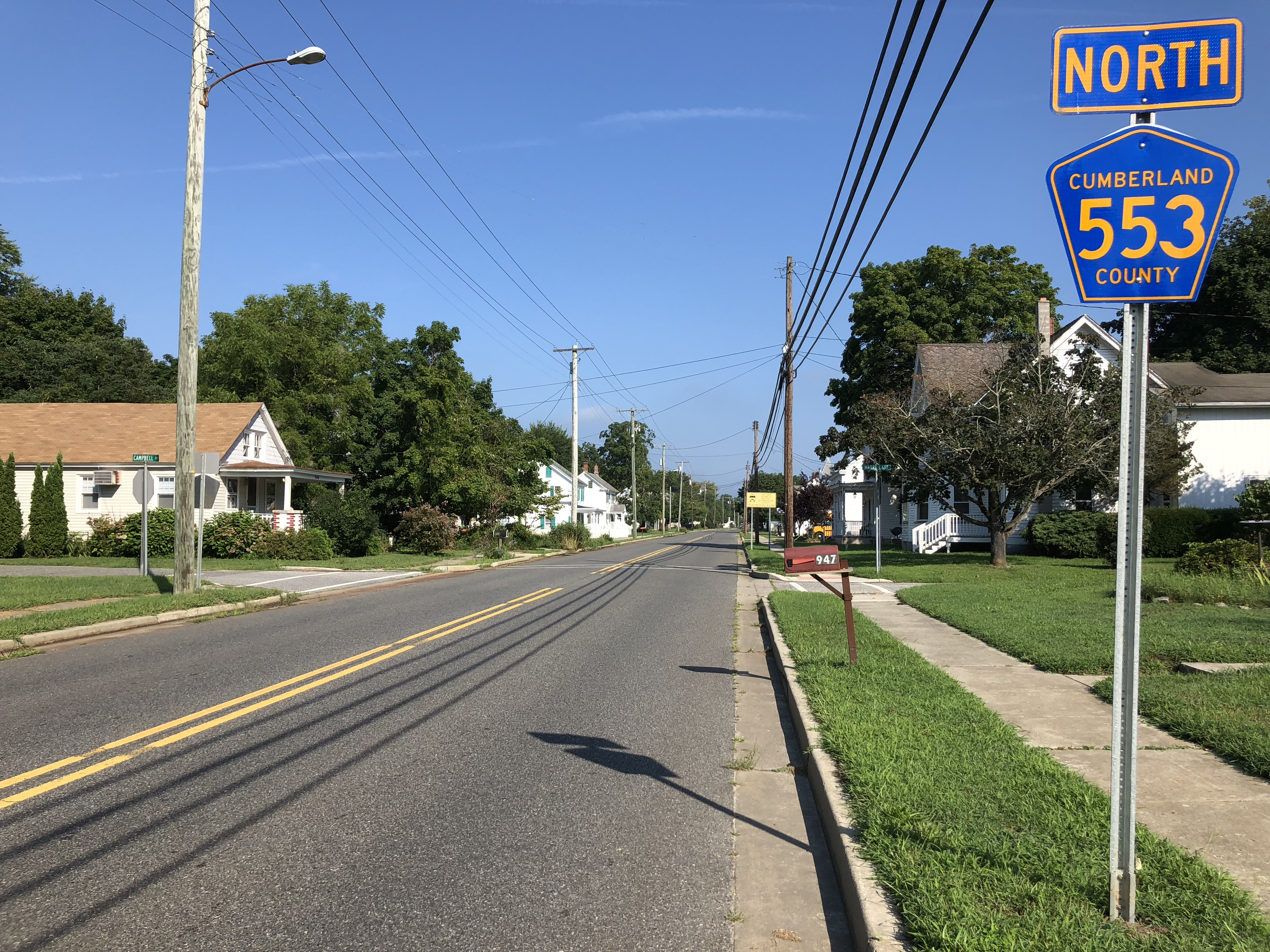
County Route 553 in Downe Township

As of May 2010, the township had a total of 54.68 miles (88.00 km) of roadways, of which 21.99 miles (35.39 km) were maintained by the municipality and 32.69 miles (52.61 km) by Cumberland County.

County Route 553 and County Route 555 are the main roads serving Downe Township.
