= Money Island, New Jersey =

Populated place in Cumberland County, New Jersey, US

- Census-designated place
- Location in Cumberland County Location in New Jersey Location in the United States
- Coordinates: 39.284°N 75.237°W
- Country: United States
- State: New Jersey
- County: Cumberland
- Townships: Downe

Area
  - Total: 0.23 sq mi (0.59 km^{2})
  - Land: 0.16 sq mi (0.42 km^{2})
  - Water: 0.066 sq mi (0.17 km^{2})
- Elevation: 0 ft (0 m)

Population (2020)
  - Total: 22
  - Density: 134.7/sq mi (51.99/km^{2})
- Time zone: UTC−05:00 (Eastern (EST))
  - Summer (DST): UTC−04:00 (EDT)
- FIPS code: 34-47006
- GNIS feature ID: 2806138

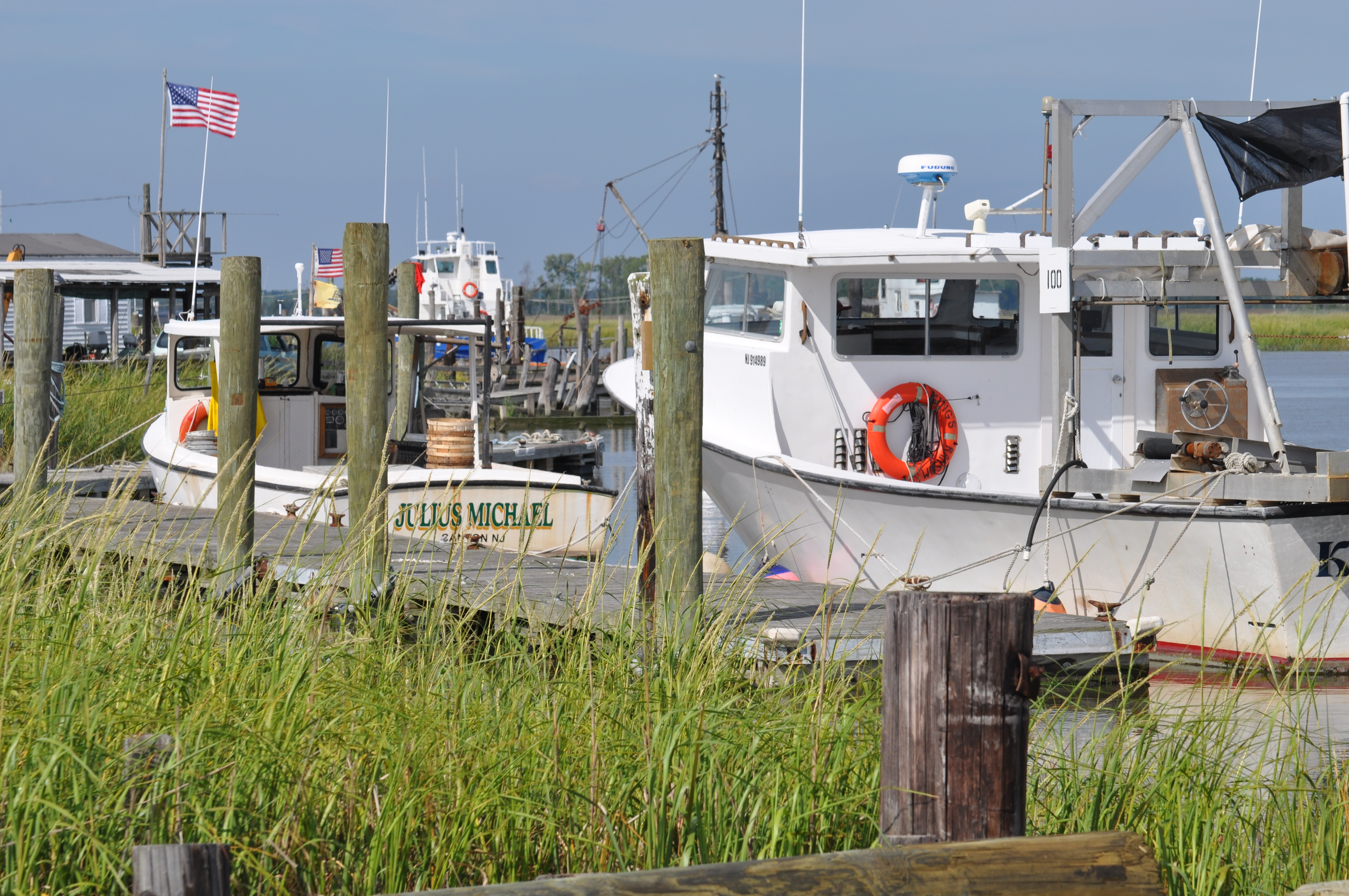
Commercial boat docks at Money Island

Money Island is an unincorporated community and census-designated place (CDP) that is the smallest and most remote of five rural communities that make up Downe Township in Cumberland County in the U.S. state of New Jersey. The road that led to the development of Money Island was constructed in the late 1930s. In the 1940s, the first homes were constructed in the community. The community is located on the shore of the Delaware Bay on the southern side of Nantuxent Creek. Its location may be described as the southwest corner of New Jersey.

Money Island is a low-income community which has been devastated by sea level rise and Hurricane Sandy. Local opinions have been divided regarding participation in the Blue Acres buy-out program, part of the New Jersey Department of Environmental Protection's process of managed retreat.

Money Island remains the second most important seafood landing port in southern New Jersey. The Money Island Marina and more than a dozen seafood harvesters or aquaculture businesses remain, with estimated annual sales of about $20 million. Products include oysters, blue claw crabs, soft-shell crabs, menhaden, conch, eels and horseshoe crabs (for medical research). Horseshoe crab harvesting was discontinued after 2016.

As of June 2016, the number of full-time residents had dropped below 20, and fewer than 10 of its original 40+ houses were occupied. A partnership of non-profit organizations—including The Nature Conservancy, BaySave, a New Jersey Nonprofit Corporation, the Partnership for the Delaware Estuary, and Rutgers University—are engaged in shoreline-stabilization research projects, attempting to arrest the erosion impact of rising waters.

Beacon Publishing Group released the book The Drowning of Money Island in November 2019 by author Andrew S. Lewis. The book featured the story of Tony Novak in his efforts to find sustainability for the community. Since much of the original story copy was trimmed during editing, Novak proposed a follow-up publication called "After the Drowning" that is in early stage production now.

The small Money Island community suffered significant losses during Covid years of 2020 and 2021 including the death of five key members and long term disability of others. Looting and storm damage left the infrastructure in poor condition. The few small fishery businesses operating at Money Island were approved for, but did not receive, Covid recovery funding. Tony Novak CPA relocated his office to Money Island and rebranded the combined operations under the trade name Nantuxent Group in an attempt to help with recovery. The marina, bait shop, charter boats, boat rental and crab business remain closed to the public at the end of the 2022 season. As of November 2022, Money Island had less than 5 full time year-round residents.

== Demographics ==
Historical population
Census	Pop.	Note	%±
2020	22		—
U.S. Decennial Census; 2020

Money Island first appeared as a census designated place in the 2020 U.S. census.

Money Island CDP, New Jersey – Racial and ethnic composition Note: the US Census treats Hispanic/Latino as an ethnic category. This table excludes Latinos from the racial categories and assigns them to a separate category. Hispanics/Latinos may be of any race.
Race / Ethnicity (NH = Non-Hispanic)	Pop 2020	2020
White alone (NH)	15	68.18%
Black or African American alone (NH)	0	0.00%
Native American or Alaska Native alone (NH)	0	0.00%
Asian alone (NH)	0	0.00%
Native Hawaiian or Pacific Islander alone (NH)	0	0.00%
Other race alone (NH)	0	0.00%
Mixed race or Multiracial (NH)	0	0.00%
Hispanic or Latino (any race)	7	31.82%
Total	22	100.00%

As of 2020, the population was 22.

== Education ==
It is in the Downe Township School District.
