= Julie Dawson =

Julie Dawson may refer to:

- Julie Seymour (born 1971), née Dawson, New Zealand netball coach, netball player and middle-distance runner
- Julie Ann Dawson (born 1971), American horror fiction writer, RPG designer, and publisher
- Julie Dawson (actor), Australian actress
