= Bethel African Methodist Episcopal Church (Springtown, New Jersey) =

Historic church in New Jersey, United States

- U.S. National Register of Historic Places
- New Jersey Register of Historic Places
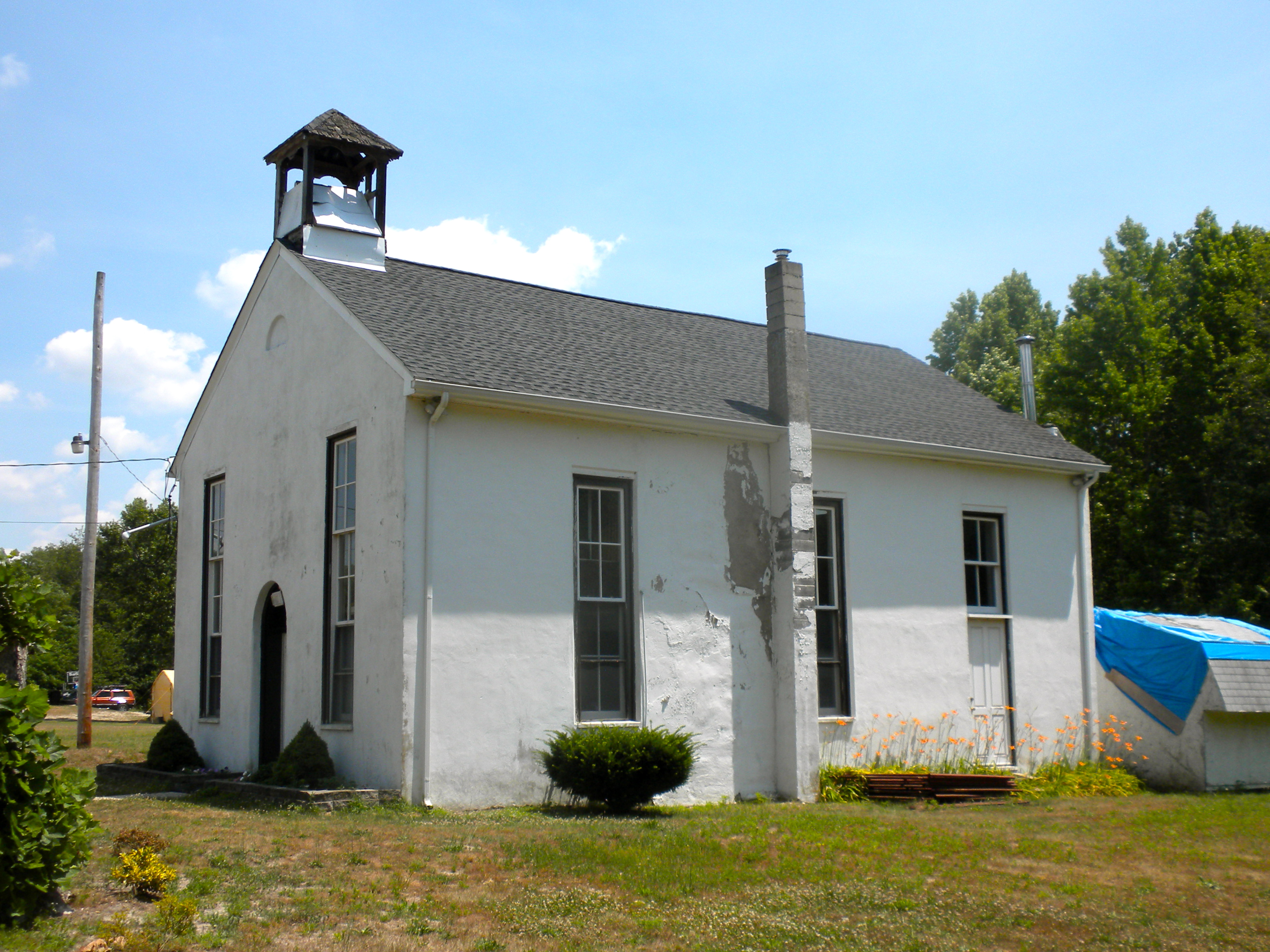

- Location within Cumberland County, New Jersey Location within New Jersey Location within the United States
- Location: 1092 Sheppards Mill Road, Greenwich Township, New Jersey 08323
- Coordinates: 39°24′52″N 75°20′05″W
- Area: 0.81 hectares (2 acres)
- Built: Circa 1838 to 1841
- Architectural style: Early Republic, Federal
- NRHP reference No.: 99001312
- Added to NRHP: November 12, 1999

Bethel African Methodist Episcopal Church is a historic African Methodist Episcopal Church in Springtown, New Jersey, United States. The church was part of two free negro communities, Othello and Springtown, established by local Quaker families, like the Van Leer Family. The congregation was established in 1810 in Greenwich Township as the African Methodist Society and joined the African Methodist Episcopal Church in 1817. A previous church building was burned down in the 1830s in an arson incident and the current structure was built between 1838 and 1841.

It is the oldest African Methodist Episcopal Church congregation in New Jersey and one of the last buildings standing where Richard Allen is known to have preached. The church and community were a stop on the Greenwich Line of the Underground Railroad through South Jersey operated by Harriet Tubman for ten years. The church and its members provided shelter and support for fugitive slaves fleeing Maryland and Delaware for free states in the north and Canada. Several church members were operators in the Underground Railroad.

The church is on the New Jersey Register of Historic Places. It was placed on the National Register of Historical Places in 1999.

== Description ==
The two-story rectangular building was built between 1838 and 1841 next to a tributary of the Cohansey River. It was built using New Jersey sandstone covered with a thin coat of mortar. A belfry was added in 1885.

== History ==
In the 17th century, Swedish, Dutch and English settlers brought slaves to South Jersey to perform the manual labor needed to establish their colonies. Many of the English settlers that founded the West Jersey colony were Quaker and began to debate the morality of owning human beings. In 1738, the Quakers of New Jersey and Pennsylvania united and submitted an agreement to the Society of Friends which recommended discontinuing the use of Africans as slaves. After the Manumission Act of 1786 and New Jersey's Gradual Abolition of Slavery Act of 1804, the free negro communities of Othello and Springtown were established by Quakers who sold small lots of lands to freed slaves to build homes and raise families.

While the Quakers were early proponents of the religious education of slaves, few African-Americans took up Quakerism. However, many Methodists evangelized in South Jersey to slaves and converted many of them. Several African-American preachers, including Richard Allen, traveled throughout the West Jersey colony and had a great impact on establishing Methodism among the African-Americans living there. Bethel African Methodist Episcopal Church is one of the oldest buildings standing where Richard Allen is known to have preached. Jarena Lee, the first female African Methodist Episcopal preacher, is also known to have preached at Bethel African Methodist Episcopal Church.

Initially, Methodist congregations in South Jersey were strong advocates of abolition and white and black parishioners worshipped together. However, in the early 1800s, black parishioners were forced from the Greenwich Township, New Jersey Methodist church after church leaders wavered in their anti-slavery stance as a result of pressure from slaveholder church members. In 1810, black parishioners formed the African Society of Methodists and joined the African Methodist Episcopal church in 1817. By 1824, the Bethel African Methodist Episcopal church congregation had grown to 38 people. The church in Othello, New Jersey, burned down in an arson incident in the late 1830s and services were held in a nearby Hicksite Quaker meetinghouse until the current structure was built sometime between 1838 and 1841.

The church and community were a stop on the Underground Railroad and supported fugitive slaves fleeing from the slave states of Maryland and Delaware to free states in the north, and Canada. The church and community were part of the Underground Railroad route through South Jersey known as the Greenwich Line. The line began in Springtown, New Jersey, ran through the Mount Zion African Methodist Episcopal Church in Small Gloucester and north to Mount Holly, Burlington and Jersey City. Harriet Tubman helped operate the Greenwich Line for over 10 years and she lived and worked in Springtown from 1849 to 1851. The church and its members provided shelter and support to fugitive slaves and several members of the church congregation were operators in the Underground Railroad. The community's location on a peninsula near the Cohansey River provided multiple water routes for slaves crossing the Delaware River from Eastern Maryland. The heavily wooded and swampy areas around Springtown provided hiding places for slaves when slave catchers came through the area.

During the American Civil War, several members of the church enlisted and served in the United States Colored Troops regiment.

By the 1990s, the congregation size declined to only four members. Due to the historical nature of the church, efforts were made to restore the structure. It is on the New Jersey Register of Historic Places and was added to the National Register of Historic Places in 1999.

== See also ==
- National Register of Historic Places listings in Cumberland County, New Jersey
