= Charles Seabrook =

Charles Seabrook may refer to:

- Charles F. Seabrook (1881–1964), American businessman
- Charles C. Seabrook (1909–2003), his son, American executive and pioneer in frozen food
