= Cumberland County Technical Education Center =

Technical high school in New Jersey, United States

Location
- 3400 College Drive; Millville (Vineland postal address), Cumberland County, New Jersey 08360; United States; 39.4352094°N 75.055202°W

Information
- Type: Vocational public high school
- School district: Cumberland County Vocational School District
- NCES School ID: 340361001816
- Principal: Gregory McGraw
- Faculty: 94.0 FTEs
- Grades: 9-12
- Enrollment: 1,194 (as of 2023–24)
- Student to teacher ratio: 12.7:1
- Newspaper: Eye of the Tiger
- Website: cctecnj.org

Cumberland County Technical Education Center (CCTEC, formally known as The John F. Scarpa Technical Education Center of Cumberland County) is a four-year vocational public high school located in Millville, in the U.S. state of New Jersey (with a Vineland postal address) that serves students in ninth through twelfth grades from across Cumberland County, operating as part of the Cumberland County Vocational School District.

As of the 2023–24 school year, the school had an enrollment of 1,194 students and 94.0 classroom teachers (on an FTE basis), for a student–teacher ratio of 12.7:1. There were 207 students (17.3% of enrollment) eligible for free lunch and 63 (5.3% of students) eligible for reduced-cost lunch.

== History ==
The school's previous campus was in Deerfield Township (with a Bridgeton postal address).

The school, previously only a part-time school, relocated starting in the 2016-17 school year to a 200,000 square feet (19,000 m^{2}) campus in Millville constructed at a cost of $70 million and located next to Cumberland County College. The school initiated a new full-time high school program that included 240 students who were a part of the initial graduating class of 2020.

After receiving a donation of $1 million from the John F. Scarpa Foundation, the school was formally named as The John F. Scarpa Technical Education Center of Cumberland County.

== Administration ==
The school's principal is Gregory McGraw. His core administration team includes four assistant principals.

== Admissions ==
County technical high schools in New Jersey may have selective admissions. In 2016 the school had 500 applicants, and testing and 7th and 8th grade grades were used to pick 241 of them.

== Curriculum ==
In 2016 the school had 17 programs.

The school previously had electrician and plumbing/HVAC programs. The CCTEC board voted to end the programs in April 2016 as the number of students had dropped, and the plumbing HVAC/teacher left due to a layoff. Once it was confirmed that the school would become a full time school, this move effectively affected only part-time students already at the school; full-time students were to later have these programs available again, but they were not scheduled to be allowed to take them.

As of 2026, incoming students can be admitted into any of the following programs:

- Automotive Technology
- Construction Trades
- Cosmetology
- Culinary Arts
- Engineering Technology
- Health Science and Medicine
- Information Technology
- Innovation Design & Entrepreneurship
- Law Enforcement
- Studio Production and Broadcasting
- Welding

== Athletics ==
Upon the full time high school program's establishment in 2016, the administrations of Millville Public Schools and Cumberland Regional High School stated that they would not admit CCTEC students into their schools' athletic teams. The CCTEC administration was negotiating with those entities to make a deal allowing athletic cooperation.

Currently, all high school students who wished to participate in high school athletic sports are allowed to play for their sending district's athletic teams. The administrations that are part of this collaborative effort are Millville Public Schools, Cumberland Regional High School, Bridgeton High School, and Vineland Public Schools.
