= Dividing Creek, New Jersey =

Populated place in Cumberland County, New Jersey, US

- Census-designated place
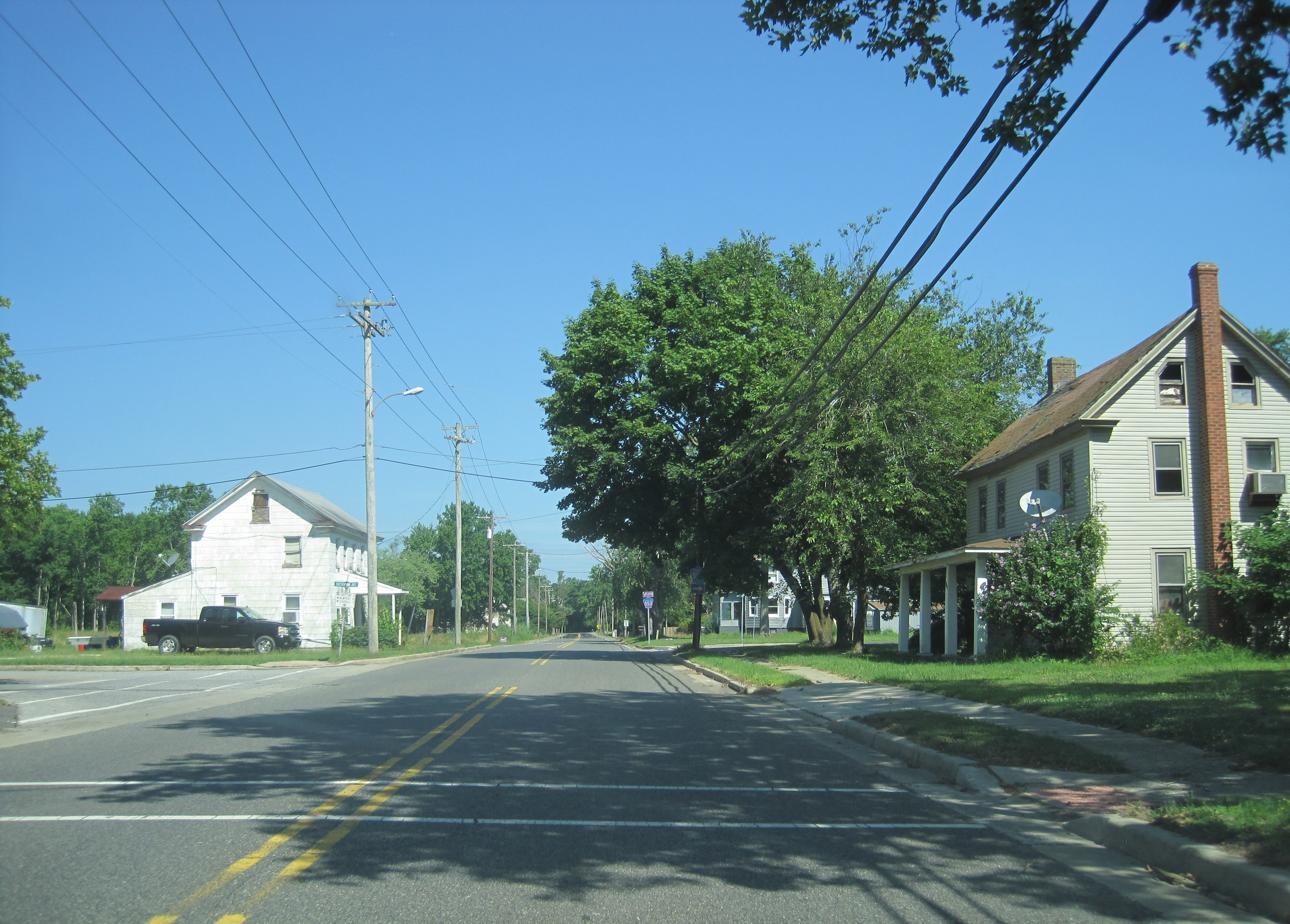

- Location in Cumberland County Location in New Jersey Location in the United States
- Coordinates: 39°16′13″N 75°06′04″W
- Country: United States
- State: New Jersey
- County: Cumberland
- Township: Downe

Area
  - Total: 1.27 sq mi (3.29 km^{2})
  - Land: 1.22 sq mi (3.17 km^{2})
  - Water: 0.050 sq mi (0.13 km^{2})
- Elevation: 10 ft (3.0 m)

Population (2020)
  - Total: 345
  - Density: 282.1/sq mi (108.93/km^{2})
- Time zone: UTC−05:00 (Eastern (EST))
  - Summer (DST): UTC−04:00 (Eastern (EDT))
- ZIP Code: 08315
- Area code: 856
- FIPS code: 34-17890
- GNIS feature ID: 875926

Dividing Creek is an unincorporated community and census-designated place (CDP) located in Downe Township in Cumberland County, in the U.S. state of New Jersey. As of the 2020 census, Dividing Creek had a population of 345.

Dividing Creek is located on County Route 553 9.7 miles (15.6 km) south-southwest of Millville and is also the location of the southern terminus of County Route 555. Dividing Creek has a post office with ZIP Code 08315.

== Demographics ==
Historical population
Census	Pop.	Note	%±
2020	345		—
2020

Dividing Creek first appeared as a census designated place in the 2020 U.S. census.

Dividing Creek CDP, New Jersey – Racial and ethnic composition Note: the US Census treats Hispanic/Latino as an ethnic category. This table excludes Latinos from the racial categories and assigns them to a separate category. Hispanics/Latinos may be of any race.
Race / Ethnicity (NH = Non-Hispanic)	Pop 2020	2020
White alone (NH)	306	88.70%
Black or African American alone (NH)	3	0.87%
Native American or Alaska Native alone (NH)	0	0.00%
Asian alone (NH)	1	0.29%
Native Hawaiian or Pacific Islander alone (NH)	0	0.00%
Other race alone (NH)	0	0.00%
Mixed race or Multiracial (NH)	18	5.22%
Hispanic or Latino (any race)	17	4.93%
Total	345	100.00%

As of the 2020 United States census, the population of the area was 345.

== Education ==
It is in the Downe Township School District.
