= Fortescue, New Jersey =

Populated place in Cumberland County, New Jersey, US

- Census-designated place
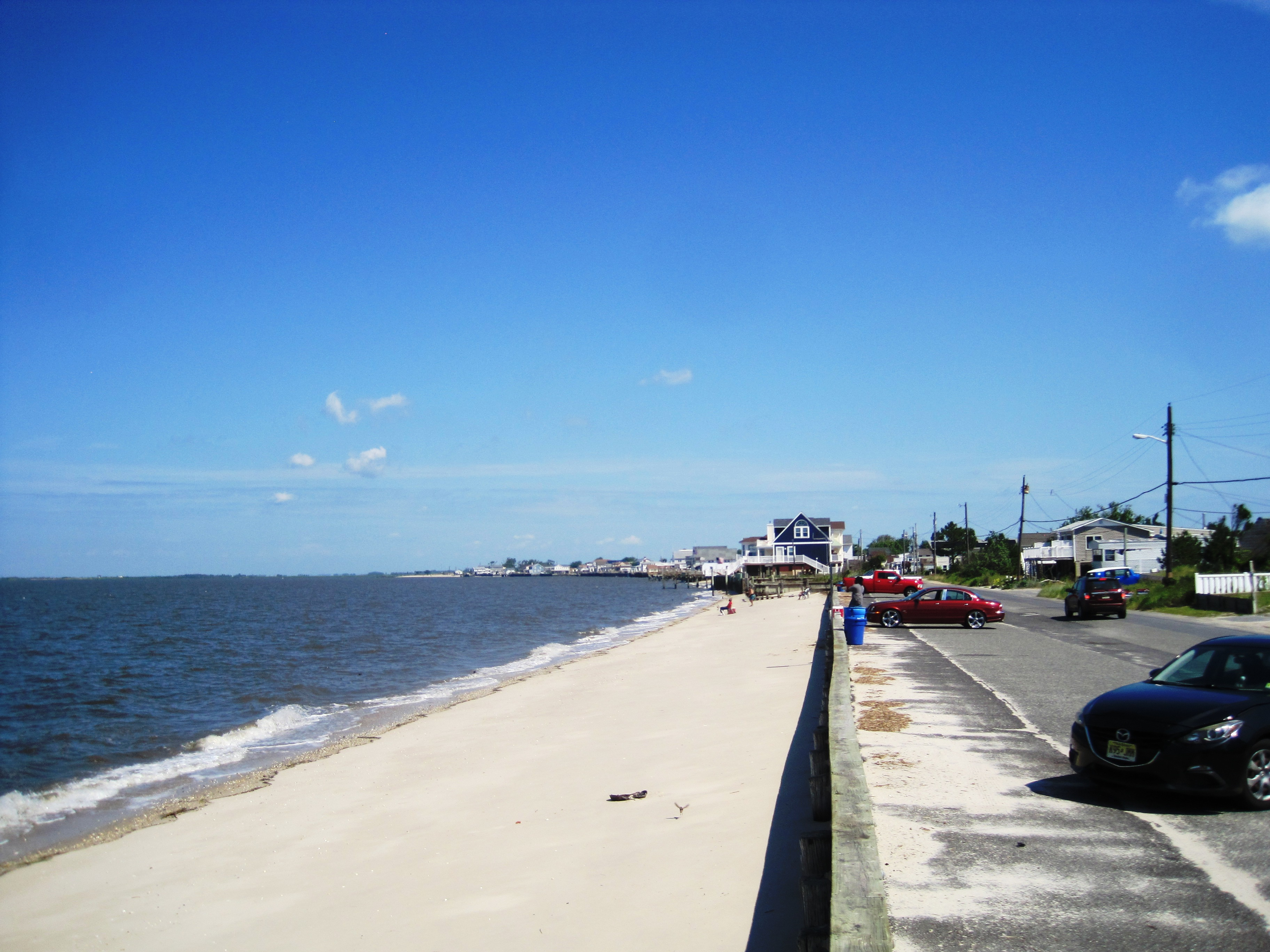
- Fortescue Beach

- Location in Cumberland County Location in New Jersey Location in the United States
- Coordinates: 39°14′15″N 75°10′18″W
- Country: United States
- State: New Jersey
- County: Cumberland
- Township: Downe

Area
  - Total: 0.31 sq mi (0.81 km^{2})
  - Land: 0.29 sq mi (0.75 km^{2})
  - Water: 0.023 sq mi (0.06 km^{2})
- Elevation: 6.6 ft (2 m)

Population (2020)
  - Total: 189
  - Density: 651.7/sq mi (251.6/km^{2})
- ZIP Code: 08321
- FIPS code: 34-24360
- GNIS feature ID: 0876423

Fortescue is a community and census-designated place (CDP) in Downe Township, Cumberland County, in the U.S. state of New Jersey. The community is located on the state's southern coast, on the Delaware Bay, surrounded on three sides by marshland. The area was named for John Fortescue, a local property owner at the time of American independence. As of the 2020 United States census, the CDP's population was 189.

During the late 1970s and mid 1980s, Fortescue experienced the best fishing it had ever seen. Anglers were catching enormous numbers of weakfish every summer. Fortescue was the self-proclaimed "weakfish capital of the world". Overfishing led federal authorities to establish limits in the mid-1970s on the weakfish catch, though by 1990 the fish population had crashed, severely impacting the commercial fishing economy in the area.

Fortescue is part of the Fortescue State Wildlife Management Area which covers 1,311.92 acres (530.92 ha).

== Demographics ==
Historical population
Census	Pop.	Note	%±
2020	189		—
U.S. Decennial Census; 2020

Fortescue first appeared as a census designated place in the 2020 U.S. census.

Fortescue CDP, New Jersey – Racial and ethnic composition Note: the US Census treats Hispanic/Latino as an ethnic category. This table excludes Latinos from the racial categories and assigns them to a separate category. Hispanics/Latinos may be of any race.
Race / Ethnicity (NH = Non-Hispanic)	Pop 2020	2020
White alone (NH)	167	88.36%
Black or African American alone (NH)	0	0.00%
Native American or Alaska Native alone (NH)	0	0.00%
Asian alone (NH)	0	0.00%
Native Hawaiian or Pacific Islander alone (NH)	0	0.00%
Other race alone (NH)	0	0.00%
Mixed race or Multiracial (NH)	15	7.94%
Hispanic or Latino (any race)	7	3.70%
Total	189	100.00%

As of 2020, the area had a population of 189.

== Climate ==
The climate in this area is characterized by hot, humid summers and generally mild to cool winters. According to the Köppen Climate Classification system, Fortescue has a humid subtropical climate, abbreviated "Cfa" on climate maps.

== Education ==
It is in the Downe Township School District.
