= Bards and Sages =

Bards and Sages is an American publisher of speculative fiction and role-playing games. The company was founded in 2002 by horror writer and game designer Julie Ann Dawson. The company produces both print and electronic media. The company was nominated for best electronic publisher in 2006 in the annual Preditors and Editors Readers' Poll.

While the company published a limited number of print products, its primary focus is on electronic media for role-playing games. Bards and Sages is one of the few women-owned and operated companies in the gaming industry. According to The New York Times, only about 10% of the people working in the gaming industry are women. The lack of women involved in both video and tabletop game production is often a topic of conversation among hobbyists, leading to lengthy forum arguments and hundreds of articles on the subject.

In January 2005, Bards and Sages published Dawson's short story and poetry collect, September and Other Stories, to positive reviews.

Between January 2009 - March 2024, Bards and Sages published Bards and Sages Quarterly, a speculative fiction magazine.

== Products ==
=== Role-playing Games ===
- Neiyar: Land of Heaven and the Abyss, a d20 campaign setting
- Koboldnomicon, d20 product focusing on kobolds in gaming
- Adventure Havens Series, a series of d20 supplements

=== Speculative Fiction ===
- Bards and Sages Quarterly, quarterly speculative fiction magazine published between January 2009 - March 2024
