= Springtown, Cumberland County, New Jersey =

Populated place in Cumberland County, New Jersey, US

Springtown, New Jersey
- Unincorporated community
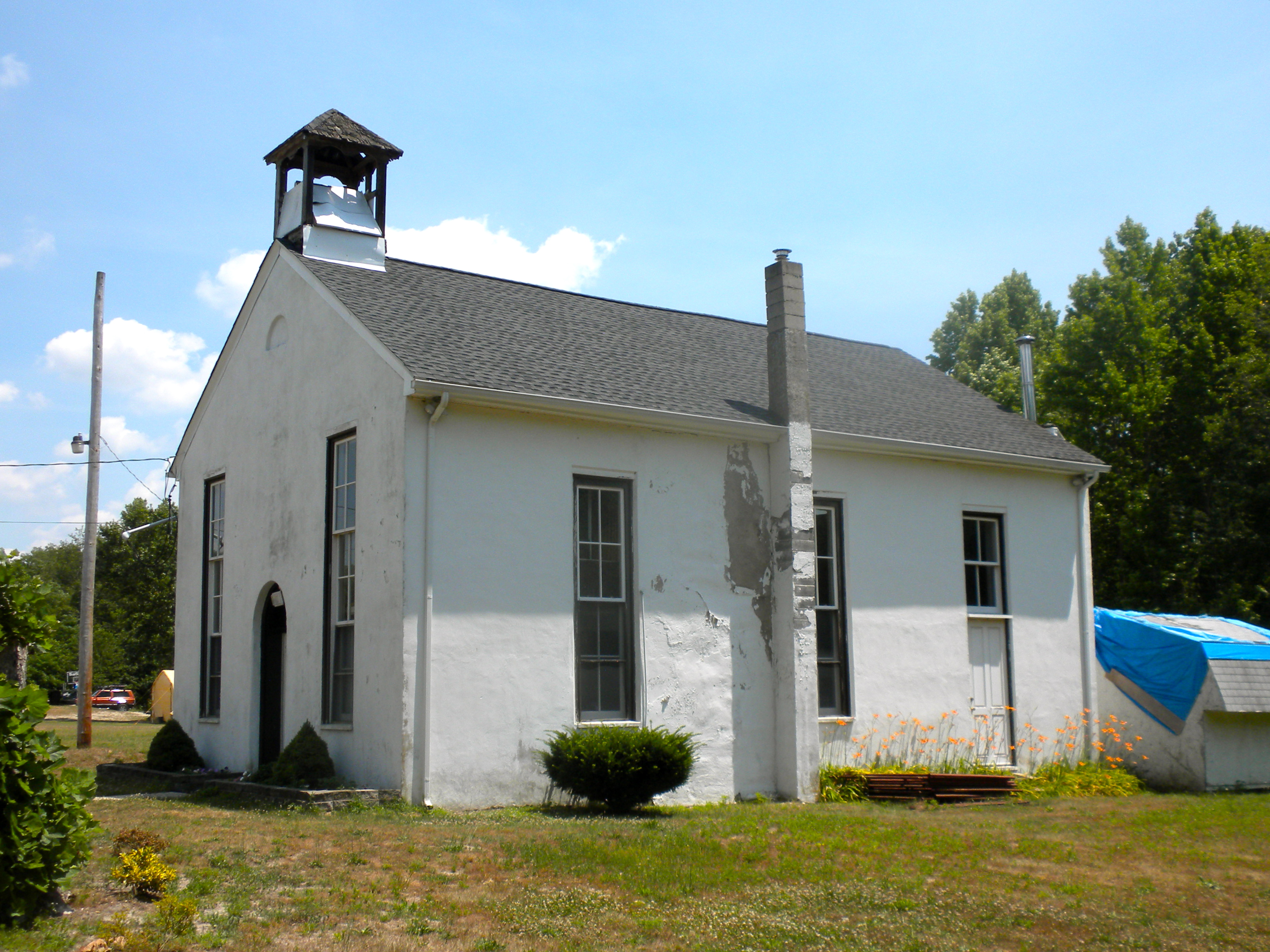
- The Bethel African Methodist Episcopal Church in Springtown is listed on the National Register of Historic Places

- Location within Cumberland County; Inset: Location of Cumberland County in New Jersey. Springtown (New Jersey) Springtown (the United States)
- Coordinates: 39°24′51″N 75°19′54″W
- Country: United States
- State: New Jersey
- County: Cumberland
- Township: Greenwich
- Elevation: 36 ft (11 m)
- Time zone: UTC−05:00 (Eastern (EST))
  - Summer (DST): UTC−04:00 (EDT)
- GNIS feature ID: 880822

Springtown is an unincorporated community in Greenwich Township, in Cumberland County, in the U.S. state of New Jersey.

Springtown is located approximately 6 mi (9.7 km) west of Bridgeton, New Jersey.

Springtown, and the nearby community of Othello, were both founded shortly after the American Revolution by African Americans.

== History ==
Legislation enacted in 1786 enabled Quakers living in Greenwich Township to sell tracts of land to "free negros". Many African Americans soon located to Springtown, and the community became a center of abolitionist activity. Harriet Tubman frequented Springtown from 1849 to 1853, and the settlement was an important station on the Underground Railroad, with five of Cumberland County's seven "station masters" living there.

The Bethel African Methodist Episcopal Church in Springtown offered lodging to fugitive slaves traveling north after leaving Delaware and Maryland's Eastern Shore.
