= Kroelinger Airport =

- IATA: none; ICAO: none; FAA LID: 29N

Summary
- Airport type: Public
- Owner: Bdgs Inc.
- Operator: Robert Pantaleo
- Serves: Vineland, New Jersey
- Location: Cumberland County, New Jersey
- Elevation AMSL: 93 ft / 28 m
- Coordinates: 39°31′26″N 075°02′47″W

Map
- Interactive map of Kroelinger Airport

Runways
Direction	Length		Surface
Direction	ft	m	Surface
10/28	2,086	636	Turf

Statistics (2010)
- Aircraft operations: 170
- Based aircraft: 3
- Source: Federal Aviation Administration

Kroelinger Airport (FAA LID: 29N) is a privately owned, public use airport in Cumberland County, New Jersey, United States. It is located three nautical miles (3.5 mi, 5.6 km) north of the central business district of Vineland.

== Facilities and aircraft ==
Kroelinger Airport covers an area of 51 acres (21 ha) at an elevation of 93 feet (28 m) above mean sea level. It has one runway designated 10/28 with a turf surface measuring 2,086 by 190 feet (636 x 58 m).

For the 12-month period ending July 31, 2010, the airport had 170 general aviation aircraft operations, an average of 14 per month. At that time there were 3 aircraft based at this airport: 100% single-engine.
