= Cumberland County Vocational School District =

School district in Cumberland County, New Jersey, US

Address
- 3400 College Drive Vineland, Cumberland County, New Jersey, 08360; United States
- Coordinates: 39.460805°N 75.157968°W

District information
- Grades: Vocational
- Superintendent: Dina Rossi
- Business administrator: Megan C. Duffield
- Schools: 1

Students and staff
- Enrollment: 1,164 (as of 2023–24)
- Faculty: 94.0 FTEs
- Student–teacher ratio: 12.4:1

Other information
- Website: www.cctecnj.org
| Ind. | Per pupil | District spending | Rank (*) | Vocational average | %± vs. average |
|---|---|---|---|---|---|
| 1A | Total Spending | $20,138 | 7 | $18,891 | 6.6% |
| 1 | Budgetary Cost | 16,575 | 11 | 17,296 | −4.2% |
| 2 | Classroom Instruction | 8,049 | 7 | 9,045 | −11.0% |
| 6 | Support Services | 1,774 | 8 | 2,269 | −21.8% |
| 8 | Administrative Cost | 4,163 | 20 | 2,353 | 76.9% |
| 10 | Operations & Maintenance | 2,454 | 5 | 3,014 | −18.6% |
| 13 | Extracurricular Activities | 119 | 2 | 464 | −74.4% |
| 16 | Median Teacher Salary | 70,823 | 17 | 65,035 |
Data from NJDoE 2014 Taxpayers' Guide to Education Spending. *Of Vocational districts with any number of students. Lowest spending=1; Highest=21

The Cumberland County Vocational School District is a vocational public school district based in Vineland, serving the vocational and training needs of high school students in ninth through twelfth grades and adults from Cumberland County, in the U.S. state of New Jersey.

As of the 2023–24 school year, the district, comprised of one school, had an enrollment of 1,164 students and 94.0 classroom teachers (on an FTE basis), for a student–teacher ratio of 12.4:1.

== School ==
The Cumberland County Technology Education Center relocated for the 2016–17 school year to a 200,000 square feet (19,000 m^{2}) campus in Vineland constructed at a cost of $70 million and located next to Cumberland County College. The school initiated a new full-time high school program involving 240 students who will be part of the initial graduating class of 2020. As of the 2023–24 school year, the high school had an enrollment of 1,194 students and 94.0 classroom teachers (on an FTE basis), for a student–teacher ratio of 12.7:1.

== Administration ==
Core members of the district's administration are:

- Dina Rossi, superintendent
- Megan C. Duffield, business administrator and board secretary

== Board of education ==
The district's board of education is comprised of seven members—the county superintendent of schools and six appointed members—who set policy and oversee the fiscal and educational operation of the district through its administration. As a Type I school district, the board's trustees are appointed by the members of the Cumberland County Board of County Commissioners to serve four-year terms of office on a staggered basis, with either one or two seats up for reappointment each year. The board appoints a superintendent to oversee the district's day-to-day operations and a business administrator to supervise the business functions of the district.
