= Bards and Sages Quarterly =

Speculative fiction magazine

- Issue 1, volume 1 cover
- Editor-in-chief: Julie Ann Dawson
- Categories: Speculative fiction, fantasy, horror, science fiction, short fiction, flash fiction
- Frequency: Quarterly
- First issue: January 1, 2009; 16 years ago
- Company: Bards and Sages
- Country: United States
- Based in: New Jersey
- Language: American English
- Website: www.bardsandsages.com/literary_offerings/bards_and_sages_quarterly
- ISSN: 1944-4699
- OCLC: 275303490

Bards and Sages Quarterly was a quarterly fantasy, horror, and science fiction literary magazine published by Bards and Sages, and edited by Julie Ann Dawson. Its first issue was released in January 2009. It was a semi-professional paying market and publishes short and flash fiction.

Dawson ceased publication of the magazine in 2024.

The Magazine held an annual Readers Choice Author or the Year contest. Past winners included Eugie Foster (2009), Kurt Bachard (2010), Julia Martins (2015) and Deborah Cher (2016).
