= Newport, Cumberland County, New Jersey =

Populated place in Cumberland County, New Jersey, US

Newport, New Jersey
- Census-designated place
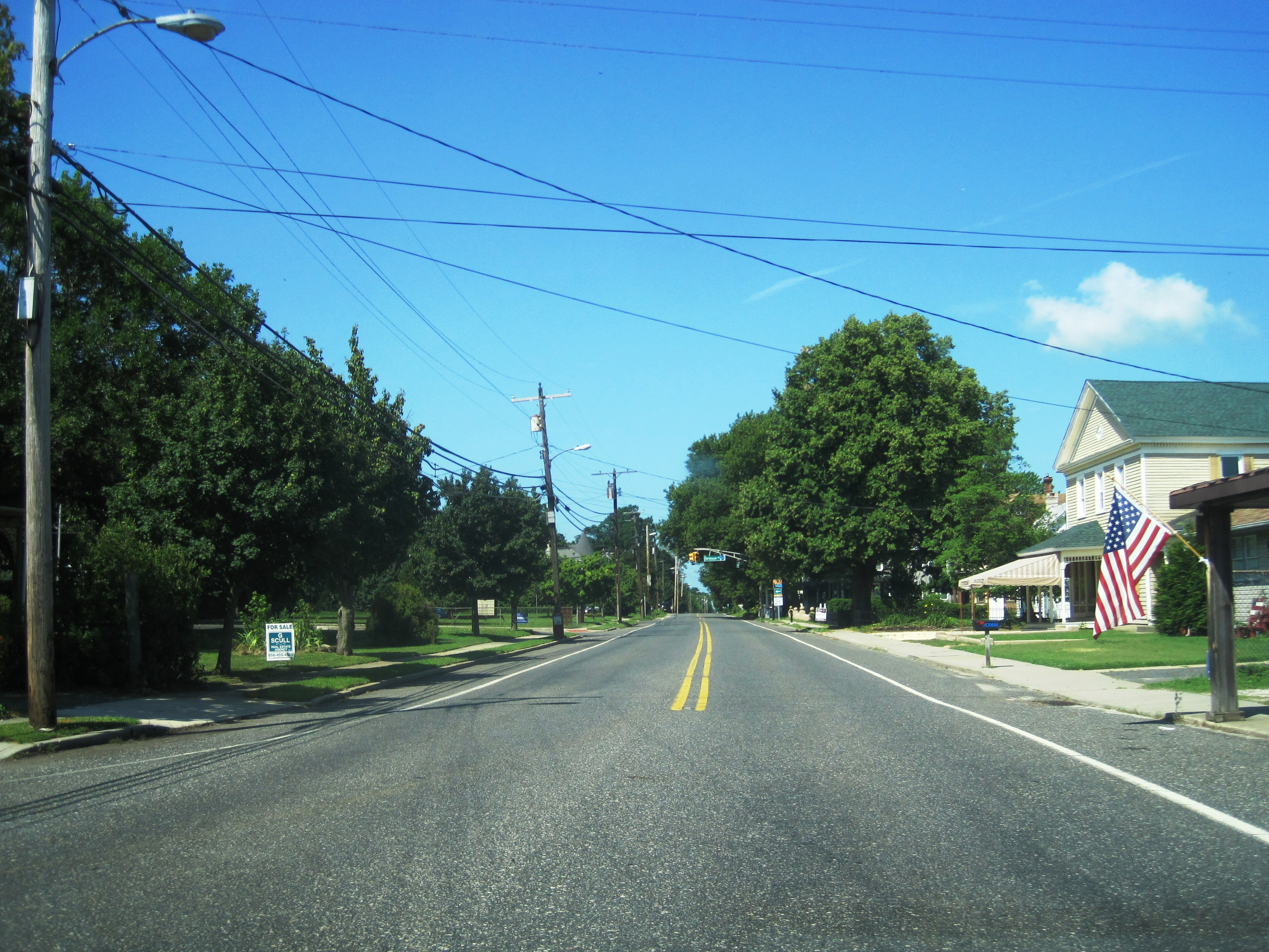
- Center of the community

- Location in Cumberland County Location in New Jersey Location in the United States
- Coordinates: 39°17′48″N 75°10′36″W
- Country: United States
- State: New Jersey
- County: Cumberland
- Township: Downe

Area
  - Total: 2.20 sq mi (5.69 km^{2})
  - Land: 2.13 sq mi (5.51 km^{2})
  - Water: 0.069 sq mi (0.18 km^{2})
- Elevation: 9.8 ft (3 m)

Population (2020)
  - Total: 487
  - Density: 229/sq mi (88.4/km^{2})
- ZIP Code: 08345
- Area code: 856
- FIPS code: 34-51750
- GNIS feature ID: 0878784

Newport is an unincorporated community and census-designated place (CDP) located within Downe Township in Cumberland County, in the U.S. state of New Jersey. The area is served as United States Postal Service ZIP Code 08345.

As of the 2000 United States census, the population for ZIP Code Tabulation Area 08345 was 834.

Newport is a very rural community, with colonial, craftsman, and Victorian style homes. County Route 553 is the main road that runs through Newport. Many coastal roads (mostly dirt) were once used for the transportation of salt hay or Saltmeadow Cordgrass. Salt hay marshes serve as pollution filters and as buffers against flooding and shoreline erosion. It was harvested for bedding and fodder for farm animals and for garden mulch.

Two journals written by Erma Moncrief were utilized in the formation of a book titled Erma's Newport Journal with help from longtime resident Emily Stites. Stites died before the journals became the final copy. The book was completed by notable resident Emma Allen, in 2006, and was sold for $10.00. The library at Downe Township Elementary has a copy of the book.

There are two churches in the community of Newport; Newport Baptist, and Newport Methodist. Barnett's gas station and Newport Deli are directly on Route 553. The Landing Restaurant sits on the bank of the Nantuxent Creek at the dead end of Landing Road. The Sundog Marina is next to The Landing Restaurant. The Delaware Bay can be reached by navigating through the Nantuxent Creek from Sundog Marina.

== Demographics ==
Historical population
Census	Pop.	Note	%±
2020	487		—
U.S. Decennial Census; 2020

Newport was first listed as a census designated place in the 2020 U.S. census.

Newport CDP, New Jersey – Racial and ethnic composition Note: the US Census treats Hispanic/Latino as an ethnic category. This table excludes Latinos from the racial categories and assigns them to a separate category. Hispanics/Latinos may be of any race.
Race / Ethnicity (NH = Non-Hispanic)	Pop 2020	2020
White alone (NH)	432	88.71%
Black or African American alone (NH)	12	2.46%
Native American or Alaska Native alone (NH)	2	0.41%
Asian alone (NH)	0	0.00%
Native Hawaiian or Pacific Islander alone (NH)	0	0.00%
Other race alone (NH)	0	0.00%
Mixed race or Multiracial (NH)	28	5.75%
Hispanic or Latino (any race)	13	2.67%
Total	487	100.00%

As of the 2020 United States census, the population was 487.

== Education ==
It is in the Downe Township School District.
