= Bridgeton Public Schools =

School district in Cumberland County, New Jersey, US

Address
- 41 Bank Street Bridgeton, Cumberland County, New Jersey, 08302; United States
- Coordinates: 39.44111°N 75.223009°W

District information
- Grades: PreK-12
- Superintendent: Celeste Merriweather
- Business administrator: Nicole Albanese
- Schools: 8
- Affiliation: Former Abbott district

Students and staff
- Enrollment: 6,313 (as of 2020–21)
- Faculty: 511.0 FTEs
- Student–teacher ratio: 12.4:1

Other information
- District Factor Group: A
- Website: www.bridgeton.k12.nj.us
Ind.	Per pupil	District spending	Rank (*)	K-12 average	%± vs. average
1A	Total Spending	$18,577	51	$18,891	−1.7%
1	Budgetary Cost	15,843	76	14,783	7.2%
2	Classroom Instruction	9,391	77	8,763	7.2%
6	Support Services	3,063	92	2,392	28.1%
8	Administrative Cost	1,517	65	1,485	2.2%
10	Operations & Maintenance	1,574	45	1,783	−11.7%
13	Extracurricular Activities	197	30	268	−26.5%
16	Median Teacher Salary	58,350	19	64,043
Data from NJDoE 2014 Taxpayers' Guide to Education Spending. *Of K-12 districts with more than 3,500 students. Lowest spending=1; Highest=103

Bridgeton Public Schools is a comprehensive community public school district that serves students in pre-kindergarten through twelfth grade from the city of Bridgeton, in Cumberland County, in the U.S. state of New Jersey. The district is one of 31 former Abbott districts statewide that were established pursuant to the decision by the New Jersey Supreme Court in Abbott v. Burke which are now referred to as "SDA Districts" based on the requirement for the state to cover all costs for school building and renovation projects in these districts under the supervision of the New Jersey Schools Development Authority.

As of the 2020–21 school year, the district, comprised of eight schools, had an enrollment of 6,313 students and 511.0 classroom teachers (on an FTE basis), for a student–teacher ratio of 12.4:1.

The district is classified by the New Jersey Department of Education as being in District Factor Group "A", the lowest of eight groupings. District Factor Groups organize districts statewide to allow comparison by common socioeconomic characteristics of the local districts. From lowest socioeconomic status to highest, the categories are A, B, CD, DE, FG, GH, I and J.

Students from Downe Township and some students from Lawrence Township (other students are sent to Millville Senior High School) attend the district's high school for ninth through twelfth grades as part of sending/receiving relationships.

== History ==
A modern-day high school program began in the Bridgeton Public Schools in the 1870s, when the term "high school" replaced what had been called "grammar school". Construction of a standalone high school building was finished for the 1893–94 school year on the site of the former Bank Street School and the building was formally opened in January of that school year. With growth in the number of high school students, the district acquired the West Jersey Academy, gradually expanding the building in 1922 and then efforts began on a new building in 1929. The school's current building was completed in 1952.

In 1948, schools were racially integrated, and all of the teachers were white.

== Schools ==
Schools in the district (with 2020–21 enrollment data from the National Center for Education Statistics) are:

Pre-Schools

- Geraldine O. Foster Early Childhood Center (308 students in PreK)

Elementary schools

- Broad Street School (936; K-8)
- Buckshutem Road School (686; K-8)
- Cherry Street School (558; K-8)
- ExCEL School (enrollment not listed; K-8)
- Indian Avenue School (668; K-8)
- Quarter Mile Lane School (744; PreK-8)
- West Avenue School (552; K-8)

High school

- Bridgeton High School (1,560; 9-12)

== Administration ==
Core members of the district's administration are:

- Celeste Merriweather, superintendent
- Nicole Albanese, business administrator and board secretary

== Board of education ==
The district's board of education, composed of nine members, sets policy and oversees the fiscal and educational operation of the district through its administration. As a Type II school district, the board's trustees are elected directly by voters to serve three-year terms of office on a staggered basis, with three seats up for election each year held (since 2016) as part of the November general election. The board appoints a superintendent to oversee the district's day-to-day operations and a business administrator to supervise the business functions of the district.
