= Othello, New Jersey =

Populated place in Cumberland County, New Jersey, US

- Census-designated place
- Location in Cumberland County Location in New Jersey Location in the United States
- Coordinates: 39.414°N 75.348°W
- Country: United States
- State: New Jersey
- County: Cumberland
- Townships: Greenwich

Area
  - Total: 1.24 sq mi (3.22 km^{2})
  - Land: 1.24 sq mi (3.21 km^{2})
  - Water: 0.0039 sq mi (0.01 km^{2})
- Elevation: 16 ft (4.9 m)

Population (2020)
  - Total: 132
  - Density: 106.5/sq mi (41.12/km^{2})
- Time zone: UTC−05:00 (Eastern (EST))
  - Summer (DST): UTC−04:00 (EDT)
- FIPS code: 34-55320
- GNIS feature ID: 2806160

Othello is an unincorporated community and census-designated place (CDP) located within Greenwich Township, Cumberland County, in the U.S. state of New Jersey. It was first listed as a CDP in the 2020 census with a population of 132.

== History ==
There were three taverns in old Greenwich: One was the Old Stone Tavern, on Ye Greate Street, another on the wharf, and the third situated in the Ewing-Bacon House, a.k.a. Resurrection Hall, at the head of Greenwich, a.k.a. Othello. Charles Ewing named the family homestead Resurrection Hall. The oldest part of the house was built by Thomas Ewing in the early 18th century. Thomas Ewing, Jr (1722-1771) was a blacksmith and Presbyterian elder.

Othello and nearby Springtown were stations on the Underground Railroad.

While Othello only had a post office from April 1897 until November 1906, the community continues to appear on many maps.

== Geography ==
Othello is located in the part of Greenwich Township referred to locally as the Head of Greenwich, or Upper Greenwich.

County routes passing through Othello include Ye Greate Street (CR 623 and CR 703) and Sheppards Mill Road (CR 650).

Pine Mount Creek is a stream that flows south through Othello to the Cohansey River and empties into Delaware Bay.

== Demographics ==
Historical population
Census	Pop.	Note	%±
2020	132		—
U.S. Decennial Census; 2020

Othello CDP, New Jersey – Racial and ethnic composition Note: the US Census treats Hispanic/Latino as an ethnic category. This table excludes Latinos from the racial categories and assigns them to a separate category. Hispanics/Latinos may be of any race.
Race / Ethnicity (NH = Non-Hispanic)	Pop 2020	2020
White alone (NH)	102	77.27%
Black or African American alone (NH)	17	12.88%
Native American or Alaska Native alone (NH)	0	0.00%
Asian alone (NH)	3	2.27%
Native Hawaiian or Pacific Islander alone (NH)	0	0.00%
Other race alone (NH)	0	0.00%
Mixed race or Multiracial (NH)	3	2.27%
Hispanic or Latino (any race)	7	5.30%
Total	132	100.00%

Othello was first listed as a census designated place in the 2020 U.S. census.

As of the 2020 United States census, the population was 132.

== Education ==
Students are zoned to Greenwich Township School District (for elementary school) and Cumberland Regional School District (for high school).

The Greenwich school district and the Stow Creek Township School District have a cooperative agreement in which all students in grade levels Kindergarten through 4 in both school districts attend the Greenwich Township school facility, Morris Goodwin School, while all students in grades 5-8 in both school districts attend the Stow Creek school facility, Stow Creek School.
