= Julie Ann Dawson =

American writer

Julie Ann Dawson (born August 1971) is an American horror fiction writer, role-playing game designer, and publisher.

== Early life ==
Dawson was born in Millville, New Jersey. Her parents are Michael and Ellie Dacy and she has two younger sisters, Crystal and Monica. While attending high school, she was inspired by Stephen King's novel Salem's Lot to become a writer. She also worked for her high school newspaper. Raised in Bridgeton, New Jersey, she graduated from Bridgeton High School in 1989, where she wrote for the school newspaper.

After high school, she enrolled in Glassboro State College (since renamed as Rowan University). There, she worked for both the college's newspaper and magazine. While at Glassboro, she also began publishing stories and poems in various publications, including Dan DeBono's Gareth Blackmore's Unusual Tales, Happiness Magazine, Lucidity, Black Bough, and The New Jersey Review of Literature. Dawson Dawson graduated from Glassboro State College in 1993.

== Professional life ==
After graduation, Dawson became a freelance writer for Vineland Journal. Embracing the growing electronic market, she published works with Demonground, Poetrymagazine.com, Sabledrake Magazine, RPG Times, and others. She also joined the International Women's Writing Guild (IWWG) and the Speculative Literature Foundation. She founded the Cautus Creative Society, which was for sculptors, poets, painters, and artists to meet. Dawson became an employee of Kirby Vacuum Company. Her first job was as a sales representative before she received a 1995 promotion to field supervisor. In 1996, she switched to being one of the company's recruiters.

In 2002, Dawson launched Bards and Sages, a small press publisher to promote her own projects, and to offer resources for young writers. The company's first project was a writing contest to benefit the IWWG.

Dawson published her first book, September and Other Stories, a collection of horror stories and poems, under Bards and Sages in 2005. It was received to positive reviews.

In March 2005, she released the Bards and Sages's first RPG, Neiyar: Land of Heaven and the Abyss. The book, employing the d20 system licensed by Wizards of the Coast, is set on an isolated jungle island ruled over by female priestesses.

Besides publishing a wide variety of electronic content, Dawson's company has an expanding catalog of print books. The first, Bardic Tales and Sage Advice, was released in February 2006 and features the winners of the company's annual writing contest. The Koboldnomicon, a compilation of d20 gaming material involving kobolds, was released in July 2006. Dead Men (and Women) Walking, an anthology of the undead, was released in September 2006.

Between January 2009 and March 2024, she was the editor-in-chief of Bards and Sages Quarterly, a speculative fiction literary magazine, published by Bards and Sages.

Dawson has been a resident of Bridgeton, New Jersey.
