= Charles C. Seabrook =

American executive (1909–2003)

Charles Courtney Seabrook (15 January 1909 – 4 October 2003) was an American executive who was an earlier pioneer in frozen food.

== Biography ==
Seabrook was born in Bridgeton, New Jersey to Charles Franklin Seabrook and Norma Dale Ivans. He was raised on a family farm in Bridgeton.

Seabrook attended a local school in Deerfield Township, New Jersey and continued his studies at Bridgeton High School from which he graduated in 1927 and then attended Mercersburg Academy. Later, he completed his bachelor's degree in civil engineering from Lehigh University in 1932. His early career included positions at a New Jersey nursery and Seabrook Engineering, a family-owned company.

In the 1930s, Seabrook, alongside his father Charles F. Seabrook and brothers Belford and John, experimented with freezing vegetables using dry ice, a technique that contributed to the early frozen food industry. This led to a collaboration with Clarence Birdseye, a pioneer in the field. The collaboration resulted in a successful line of frozen vegetables under the Seabrook Farms brand. The farm, once a small family operation, expanded to cover 55,000 acres (22,000 ha).

During World War II, Seabrook assisted the War Food Administration in developing food packaging and processing techniques. After the war, Seabrook assumed a role in the sales department of Seabrook Farms and subsequently became president of the National Frozen Food Association.

Despite the company's growth, internal disagreements in the mid-1950s led to the sale of Seabrook Farms to Seeman Brothers, a grocery wholesaler in New York. Subsequently, he left the family business and worked at Standard Packaging Company until his retirement in 1974.

== Personal life ==
Charles Seabrook's first wife, Mae Dilks Seabrook, died in 1978. Later, he married Margaret Huber in 1979, who died in 1997. He is survived by a son, two daughters, a stepdaughter, a stepson, and six grandchildren.
