= Bridgeton High School =

High school in Cumberland County, New Jersey, US

Location
- 111 North West Avenue; Bridgeton, Cumberland County, New Jersey 08302; United States
- 39°26′18″N 75°14′42″W

Information
- Type: Public high school
- School district: Bridgeton Public Schools
- NCES School ID: 340225001784
- Principal: Michael Eckmeyer
- Faculty: 109.0 FTEs
- Grades: 9-12
- Enrollment: 1,641 (as of 2024–25)
- Student to teacher ratio: 15.1:1
- Colors: Maroon and White
- Athletics conference: Cape-Atlantic League
- Team name: Bulldogs
- Website: bhs.bridgeton.k12.nj.us

Bridgeton High School is a comprehensive community public high school that serves students in ninth through twelfth grades from the city of Bridgeton, in Cumberland County, in the U.S. state of New Jersey, operating as part of the Bridgeton Public Schools, an Abbott District. The school has been accredited by the Middle States Association of Colleges and Schools Commission on Elementary and Secondary Schools since 1931.

Students from Downe Township and Lawrence Township attend the high school as part of a sending/receiving relationship.

As of the 2024–25 school year, the school had an enrollment of 1,641 students and 109.0 classroom teachers (on an FTE basis), for a student–teacher ratio of 15.1:1. There were 1,419 students (86.5% of enrollment) eligible for free lunch and 84 (5.1% of students) eligible for reduced-cost lunch.

== History ==
A modern-day high school program began in the Bridgeton Public Schools in the 1870s, when the term "high school" replaced what had been called "grammar school". Construction of a standalone high school building was finished for the 1893–94 school year on the site of the former Bank Street School and the building was formally opened in January of that school year. With growth in the number of high school students, the district acquired the West Jersey Academy, gradually expanding the building in 1922 and then efforts began on a new building in 1929. The school's current building was completed in 1952.

== Awards, recognition and rankings ==
The school was the 334th-ranked public high school in New Jersey out of 339 schools statewide in New Jersey Monthly magazine's September 2014 cover story on the state's "Top Public High Schools", using a new ranking methodology. The school had been ranked 273rd in the state of 328 schools in 2012, after being ranked 303rd in 2010 out of 322 schools listed. The magazine ranked the school 297th in 2008 out of 316 schools. The school was ranked 283rd in the magazine's September 2006 issue, which surveyed 316 schools across the state.

== Athletics ==
The Bridgeton High School Bulldogs compete in the National Division of the Cape-Atlantic League, an athletic conference comprised of both parochial and public high schools located in Atlantic, Cape May, Cumberland and Gloucester counties, operating under the supervision of the New Jersey State Interscholastic Athletic Association (NJSIAA). With 1,315 students in grades 10-12, the school was classified by the NJSIAA for the 2022–24 school years as Group IV South for most athletic competition purposes. The football team competes in the United Division of the 94-team West Jersey Football League superconference and was classified by the NJSIAA as Group V South for football for 2024–2026, which included schools with 1,333 to 2,324 students.

The boys' baseball team won the South Jersey Group IV state sectional championship in 1962 and were runner-up to Livingston High School in 1976 for the Group IV state championship.

The boys cross country team won the Group III state championship in 1988.

The boys track team won the indoor state championship in Group III in 1989 (as co-champion), 1991 and 1994 and won the Group II title in 1995 (co-champion), 1999 (co-champion), 2001 and 2002; the program's six state group titles are tied for 11th-most in the state. The girls track team won the Group III title in 1993 and 1994, and in Group II in 1998 (as co-champion) and 2000; the program's four state titles are tied for tenth-most statewide.

The boys track team won the spring / outdoor track state championship in Group III in 1991-1995, and in Group II in 1997, 2002 and 2006.

The boys track team won the indoor relay championship in Group III in 1994 and in Group II in 1997, 2001 and 2002

The football team won the South Jersey Group II state sectional championship in 1997 and 1999. The 1997 team won the South Jersey Group II state sectional title with a 20-8 win against Gloucester City High School in the championship game, the first title since the school was awarded the championship in 1947.

The boys spring / outdoor track team was the New Jersey State Interscholastic Athletic Association state champions in 1991–1995 in Group III, and in 1997, 2002 and 2006 in Group II.

== Administration ==
The school's principal is Michael Eckmeyer. The school's core administration team includes five assistant principals.

== Notable alumni ==
- Markquese Bell (born 1999), American football safety for the Dallas Cowboys of the National Football League
- Robin Bernstein (born 1953, class of 1972), Florida businesswoman who has served as the United States Ambassador to the Dominican Republic
- John Borican (1913–1942), long-distance runner
- Joseph W. Chinnici (1919-2007), politician who served in the New Jersey General Assembly from the 1st Legislative District from 1972 to 1988
- Nadia Davy (born 1980, class of 1999), Jamaican track athlete who won a bronze medal at the 2004 Olympic Games in Athens, Greece
- Julie Ann Dawson (born 1971, class of 1989), horror fiction writer, role-playing game designer and publisher
- Braheme Days Jr. (born 1995), shot putter
- James Galanos (born 1924, class of 1942), fashion designer
- Helen Gandy (1897–1988) Secretary to Federal Bureau of Investigation Director J. Edgar Hoover for 54 years
- George Jamison (born 1962), NFL linebacker who played for the Detroit Lions
- Harvey Johnson (1919–1983), head coach of the NFLs Buffalo Bills in 1971
- Brison Manor (born 1952), defensive lineman who played eight seasons in the National Football League for the Denver Broncos, from 1977 to 1984
- Rube Oldring (1884–1961), professional baseball outfielder from 1905 to 1918, who played for the Philadelphia Athletics and New York Yankees
- Harold E. Pierce (1922-2006), dermatologist and cosmetic surgeon
- Jeffrey Sammons (born c. 1949, class of 1967), historian and professor who has focused on African-American history, military history and sports history
- Charles C. Seabrook (1909-2003, class of 1927), executive who was an earlier pioneer in frozen food
- George H. Stanger (1902–1958), politician who served in the New Jersey Senate from 1938 to 1946
- Dominique Williams (born 1990), football running back
- Shana Williams (born 1972, class of 1989), former track and field athlete who competed in the long jump
- H. Boyd Woodruff (1917-2017), soil microbiologist who discovered actinomycin and developed industrial production by fermentation of many natural products, including cyanocobalamin (a synthetic form of Vitamin B12), the avermectins and other important antibiotics
