= Downe Township School District =

School district in Cumberland County, New Jersey, US

Address
- 220 Main Street Newport, Cumberland County, New Jersey, 08345; United States
- Coordinates: 39.296942°N 75.164714°W

District information
- Grades: PreK 3-8
- Superintendent: Sherri Miller
- Business administrator: Lisa DiNovi
- Schools: 1

Students and staff
- Enrollment: 176 (as of 2023–24)
- Faculty: 17.4 FTEs
- Student–teacher ratio: 10.1:1

Other information
- District Factor Group: A
- Website: www.downeschool.org
Ind.	Per pupil	District spending	Rank (*)	K-8 average	%± vs. average
1A	Total Spending	$17,789	31	$18,891	−5.8%
1	Budgetary Cost	15,387	37	14,159	8.7%
2	Classroom Instruction	8,805	29	8,659	1.7%
6	Support Services	2,650	44	2,167	22.3%
8	Administrative Cost	1,487	22	1,547	−3.9%
10	Operations & Maintenance	2,235	53	1,612	38.6%
13	Extracurricular Activities	29	9	104	−72.1%
16	Median Teacher Salary	69,748	67	61,136
Data from NJDoE 2014 Taxpayers' Guide to Education Spending. *Of K-8 districts with up to 400 students. Lowest spending=1; Highest=71

The Downe Township School District is a community public school district that serves students in pre-kindergarten through eighth grade from Downe Township, in Cumberland County, in the U.S. state of New Jersey.

As of the 2023–24 school year, the district, comprised of one school, had an enrollment of 176 students and 17.4 classroom teachers (on an FTE basis), for a student–teacher ratio of 10.1:1.

The district participates in the Interdistrict Public School Choice Program, which allows non-resident students to attend school in the district at no cost to their parents, with tuition covered by the resident district. Available slots are announced annually by grade.

Public school students in ninth through twelfth grades attend Bridgeton High School in Bridgeton, as part of a sending/receiving relationship with the Bridgeton Public Schools. As of the 2023–24 school year, the high school had an enrollment of 1,703 students and 103.5 classroom teachers (on an FTE basis), for a student–teacher ratio of 16.5:1.

== History ==
In the 2016–17 school year, Downe had the 38th smallest enrollment of any school district in the state, with 185 students.

The district had been classified by the New Jersey Department of Education as being in District Factor Group "A", the lowest of eight groupings. District Factor Groups organize districts statewide to allow comparison by common socioeconomic characteristics of the local districts. From lowest socioeconomic status to highest, the categories are A, B, CD, DE, FG, GH, I, and J.

== School ==
Downe Township School had an enrollment of 175 students in grades PreK-8 for the 2023–24 school year.

- Sherri Miller, principal

== Administration ==
Core members of the district's administration are:

- Sherri Miller, superintendent
- Lisa DiNovi, business administrator and board secretary

== Board of education ==
The district's board of education, comprised of nine members, sets policy and oversees the fiscal and educational operation of the district through its administration. As a Type II school district, the board's trustees are elected directly by voters to serve three-year terms of office on a staggered basis, with three seats up for election each year held (since 2012) as part of the November general election. The board appoints a superintendent to oversee the district's day-to-day operations and a business administrator to supervise the business functions of the district.
