= Cumberland County, New Jersey =

County in New Jersey, United States

- County
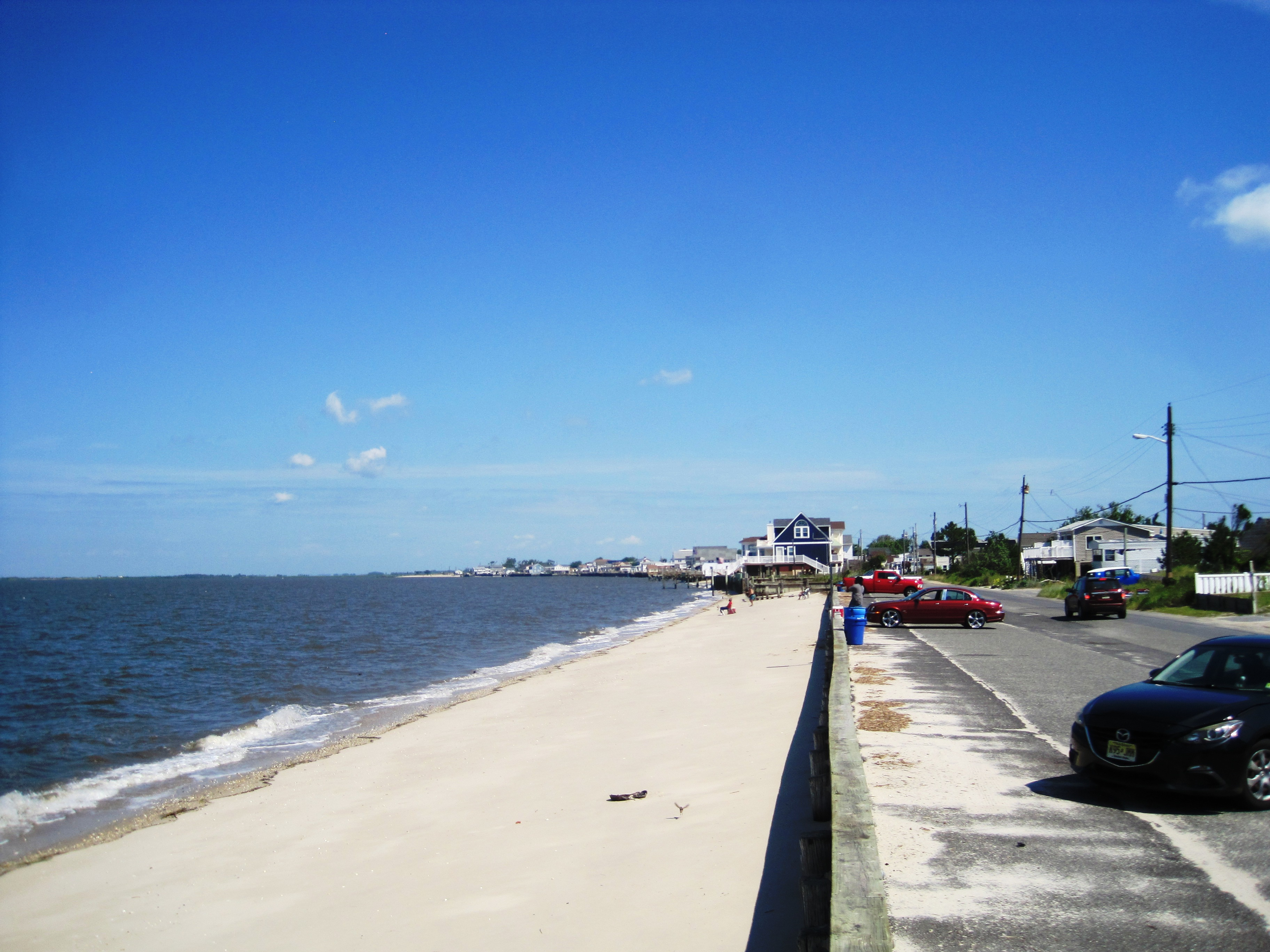
- Fortescue Beach in Downe Township, on the Delaware Bayshore of New Jersey

- Flag Seal

- Location within the U.S. state of New Jersey
- Interactive map of Cumberland County, New Jersey
- Coordinates: 39.33°N 75.13°W
- Country: United States
- State: New Jersey
- Founded: 1748
- Named for: Prince William, Duke of Cumberland
- Seat: Bridgeton
- Largest municipalities: Vineland (population); Maurice River Township (area)

Government
  - Director of the Board of County Commissioners: Director Douglas A. Albrecht (R, term ends December 31, 2023)

Area
  - Total: 677.85 sq mi (1,755.6 km^{2})
  - Land: 483.36 sq mi (1,251.9 km^{2})
  - Water: 194.49 sq mi (503.7 km^{2}) 28.7%

Population (2020)
  - Total: 154,152 ▼
  - Estimate (2025): 157,148
  - Density: 318.92/sq mi (123.13/km^{2})
- Time zone: UTC−5 (Eastern)
  - Summer (DST): UTC−4 (EDT)
- Congressional district: 2nd
- Website: cumberlandcountynj.gov

Cumberland County is a coastal county located on the Delaware Bay in the Southern Shore Region of the U.S. state of New Jersey. As of the 2020 census, the county was the state's 16th-most-populous county, with a population of 154,152, a decrease of 2,746 (−1.8%) from the 2010 census count of 156,898. The United States Census Bureau's Population Estimates Program estimated a 2025 population of 157,148, an increase of 2,996 (+1.9%) from the 2020 decennial census. Its county seat is Bridgeton. Cumberland County is named for Prince William, Duke of Cumberland. The county was formally created from portions of Salem County on January 19, 1748. The county is part of the South Jersey region of the state.

The most populous municipality is Vineland, which had a 2020 population of 60,780; the largest municipality by area is Maurice River Township, which covered 95.76 square miles (248.0 km^{2}).

This county is part of the Vineland-Bridgeton metropolitan statistical area, as well as the Philadelphia metropolitan area.

== History ==
=== Etymology ===
The county is named for Prince William, Duke of Cumberland who is best remembered for his role in putting down the Jacobite Rising at the Battle of Culloden in 1746, which made him immensely popular throughout parts of Britain.

=== Pre-settlement ===
The first people to populate Cumberland County were early descendants of the Lenape, also known as the Delaware, who include all Native American people who have lived in New Jersey Water sources such as the Cohansey River and Maurice River made Cumberland County a resourceful environment for early native groups to utilize. Archaeological materials such as stone tools and pottery have been excavated in sites in Bridgeton and in Fairfield, Greenwich and Stow Creek townships. Some of the earliest cultures that inhabited Cumberland County utilized clovis spear points which date to the Paleoindian period (10,000 BC to 8000 BC). As the climate switched from a tundra to woodlands during the archaic period (8000 BC to 1000 BC), ancestors of the Lenape developed axe technology, and later pottery during the woodland period (1000 BC to 1600 AD). The prehistoric period ended when European exploration and settlement arrived in the area bringing with it greater technology which ultimately supplanted much of the Native populations.

=== History ===
Early European settlement began with the Swedish who called what is now New Jersey New Sweden during the first half of the 17th century. Prior to the United States gaining its independence from Great Britain, Cumberland County was deemed separate from Salem County in 1748 and was named after the Duke of Cumberland. Cumberland County's economic exploits were agricultural and manufacturing, more specifically the county focused on fruits and vegetables, as well as glassware and preserved foods.

America's early successes in glassmaking began in Southern New Jersey during the 18th century and eventually led to John Landis Mason of Vineland New Jersey to invent the mason jar for storing and preserving food at home during the 1850s. Cumberland County's population has historically been "majority-minority". Cumberland County went from holding one hundred and twenty enslaved people in 1790, to two by 1830. Cumberland County included several towns settled by Black Americans many of whom escaped slavery. Parts of the county were used for the Underground Railroad, and housed Harriet Tubman and William Still.

=== Maritime history ===
In addition to agriculture and glassware, Cumberland County is known for its maritime industries. Its main maritime export was oysters until the 1950s when disease destroyed the oyster population. With the oyster industry came shipbuilding in 1780. Later, the industrial revolution and railroad development increased the number of ships and the types of ships being made. By the late 19th century, ships switched from the sloop model to the schooner to be more useful for oystering.

Whaling was also an industry in Cumberland County until 1775 when settlers turned to livestock, farming, and trapping. Caviar was a short-lived industry in the area from the 1860s to 1925, when sturgeon had been overfished. There are 19th and 20th century maritime related artifacts such as ship models, building plans, tools, and rigging equipment at the John Dubois Maritime Museum in Bridgeton.

== Geography ==
According to the United States Census Bureau, as of the 2020 Census, the county had a total area of 677.85 square miles (1,755.6 km^{2}), of which 483.36 square miles (1,251.9 km^{2}) was land (71.3%) and 194.49 square miles (503.7 km^{2}) was water (28.7%). Cumberland is a low-lying, generally featureless coastal county, with many salt marshes near the Delaware Bay. The highest elevation is at one of 12 areas in Upper Deerfield Township that stand approximately 140 feet (43 m) above sea level; the lowest elevation is sea level.

=== Climate and weather ===
Bridgeton, New Jersey

Climate chart (precipitation, max. and min. temperature)
J	F	M	A	M	J	J	A	S	O	N	D
3.6 41 25	2.9 44 28	4.3 52 34	4 63 43	3.8 73 53	4.2 82 63	4.1 87 68	4.1 85 66	4.3 78 59	3.6 67 47	3.3 56 39	4 45 30
- █ Average max. and min. temperatures in °F
- █ Precipitation totals in inches
- Source: The Weather Channel
Metric conversion
J	F	M	A	M	J	J	A	S	O	N	D
90 5 −4	75 7 −2	109 11 1	102 17 6	95 23 12	107 28 17	103 31 20	104 29 19	108 26 15	91 19 8	83 13 4	101 7 −1
- █ Average max. and min. temperatures in °C
- █ Precipitation totals in mm

In recent years, average temperatures in the county seat of Bridgeton have ranged from a low of 25 °F (−4 °C) in January to a high of 87 °F (31 °C) in July, although a record low of −13 °F (−25 °C) was recorded in January 1985 and a record high of 101 °F (38 °C) was recorded in July 1966. Average monthly precipitation ranged from 2.94 inches (75 mm) in February to 4.30 inches (109 mm) in March. Cumberland has a humid subtropical climate (Cfa).

== Demographics ==
Historical population
Census	Pop.	Note	%±
1790	8,248		—
1800	9,529		15.5%
1810	12,670		33.0%
1820	12,668		0.0%
1830	14,093		11.2%
1840	14,374		2.0%
1850	17,189		19.6%
1860	22,605		31.5%
1870	34,665		53.4%
1880	37,687		8.7%
1890	45,438		20.6%
1900	51,193		12.7%
1910	55,153		7.7%
1920	61,348		11.2%
1930	69,895		13.9%
1940	73,184		4.7%
1950	88,597		21.1%
1960	106,850		20.6%
1970	121,374		13.6%
1980	132,866		9.5%
1990	138,053		3.9%
2000	146,438		6.1%
2010	156,898		7.1%
2020	154,152		−1.8%
2025 (est.)	157,148		1.9%
Historical sources: 1790-1990; 1970-2010 2010 2020

=== 2020 census ===
As of the 2020 census, the county had a population of 154,152. The median age was 38.2 years. 23.2% of residents were under the age of 18 and 15.9% of residents were 65 years of age or older. For every 100 females there were 104.6 males, and for every 100 females age 18 and over there were 105.3 males age 18 and over.

The racial makeup of the county was 48.4% White, 18.5% Black or African American, 1.5% American Indian and Alaska Native, 1.4% Asian, <0.1% Native Hawaiian and Pacific Islander, 18.2% from some other race, and 11.9% from two or more races. Hispanic or Latino residents of any race comprised 34.4% of the population.

75.5% of residents lived in urban areas, while 24.5% lived in rural areas.

There were 52,649 households in the county, of which 33.9% had children under the age of 18 living in them. Of all households, 41.0% were married-couple households, 17.7% were households with a male householder and no spouse or partner present, and 32.2% were households with a female householder and no spouse or partner present. About 25.5% of all households were made up of individuals and 12.2% had someone living alone who was 65 years of age or older.

There were 57,119 housing units, of which 7.8% were vacant. Among occupied housing units, 62.7% were owner-occupied and 37.3% were renter-occupied. The homeowner vacancy rate was 2.3% and the rental vacancy rate was 5.9%.

According to the 2019 American Community Survey 1-year estimates, the median household income was $54,587, and the median family income was $65,022. About 13.2% of the population were below the poverty line, including 17.1% of those under age 18 and 10.4% of those age 65 or over.

=== Racial and ethnic composition ===
Cumberland County, New Jersey – Racial and ethnic composition Note: the US Census treats Hispanic/Latino as an ethnic category. This table excludes Latinos from the racial categories and assigns them to a separate category. Hispanics/Latinos may be of any race.
Race / Ethnicity (NH = Non-Hispanic)	Pop 1980	Pop 1990	Pop 2000	Pop 2010	Pop 2020	% 1980	% 1990	% 2000	% 2010	% 2020
White alone (NH)	98,735	95,129	85,510	78,931	65,808	74.31%	68.91%	58.39%	50.31%	42.69%
Black or African American alone (NH)	19,449	22,167	28,134	29,376	26,375	14.64%	16.06%	19.21%	18.72%	17.11%
Native American or Alaska Native alone (NH)	745	1,203	1,077	1,102	905	0.56%	0.87%	0.74%	0.70%	0.59%
Asian alone (NH)	850	1,063	1,338	1,854	2,051	0.64%	0.77%	0.91%	1.18%	1.33%
Native Hawaiian or Pacific Islander alone (NH)	x	x	39	31	12	x	x	0.03%	0.02%	0.01%
Other race alone (NH)	562	143	136	216	595	0.42%	0.10%	0.09%	0.14%	0.39%
Mixed race or Multiracial (NH)	x	x	2,381	2,931	5,352	x	x	1.63%	1.87%	3.47%
Hispanic or Latino (any race)	12,525	18,348	27,823	42,457	53,054	9.43%	13.29%	19.00%	27.06%	34.42%
Total	132,866	138,053	146,438	156,898	154,152	100.00%	100.00%	100.00%	100.00%	100.00%

=== 2010 census ===
The 2010 United States census counted 156,898 people, 51,931 households, and 36,559 families in the county. The population density was 324.4 inhabitants per square mile (125.3/km^{2}). There were 55,834 housing units at an average density of 115.4 per square mile (44.6/km^{2}). The racial makeup was 62.74% (98,430) White, 20.23% (31,741) Black or African American, 1.11% (1,746) Native American, 1.22% (1,907) Asian, 0.04% (59) Pacific Islander, 11.15% (17,492) from other races, and 3.52% (5,523) from two or more races. Hispanic or Latino of any race were 27.06% (42,457) of the population.

Of the 51,931 households, 31.4% had children under the age of 18; 45.2% were married couples living together; 18.6% had a female householder with no husband present and 29.6% were non-families. Of all households, 24% were made up of individuals and 10.8% had someone living alone who was 65 years of age or older. The average household size was 2.79 and the average family size was 3.26.

Of the population, 24% were under the age of 18, 9.5% from 18 to 24, 28.5% from 25 to 44, 25.3% from 45 to 64, and 12.6% who were 65 years of age or older. The median age was 36.5 years. For every 100 females, the population had 106.2 males. For every 100 females ages 18 and older there were 106.9 males.

== Economy ==
The Bureau of Economic Analysis calculated that the county's gross domestic product was $5.9 billion in 2021, which was ranked 17th in the state and was a 3.8% increase from the prior year.

== Government ==
=== County government ===
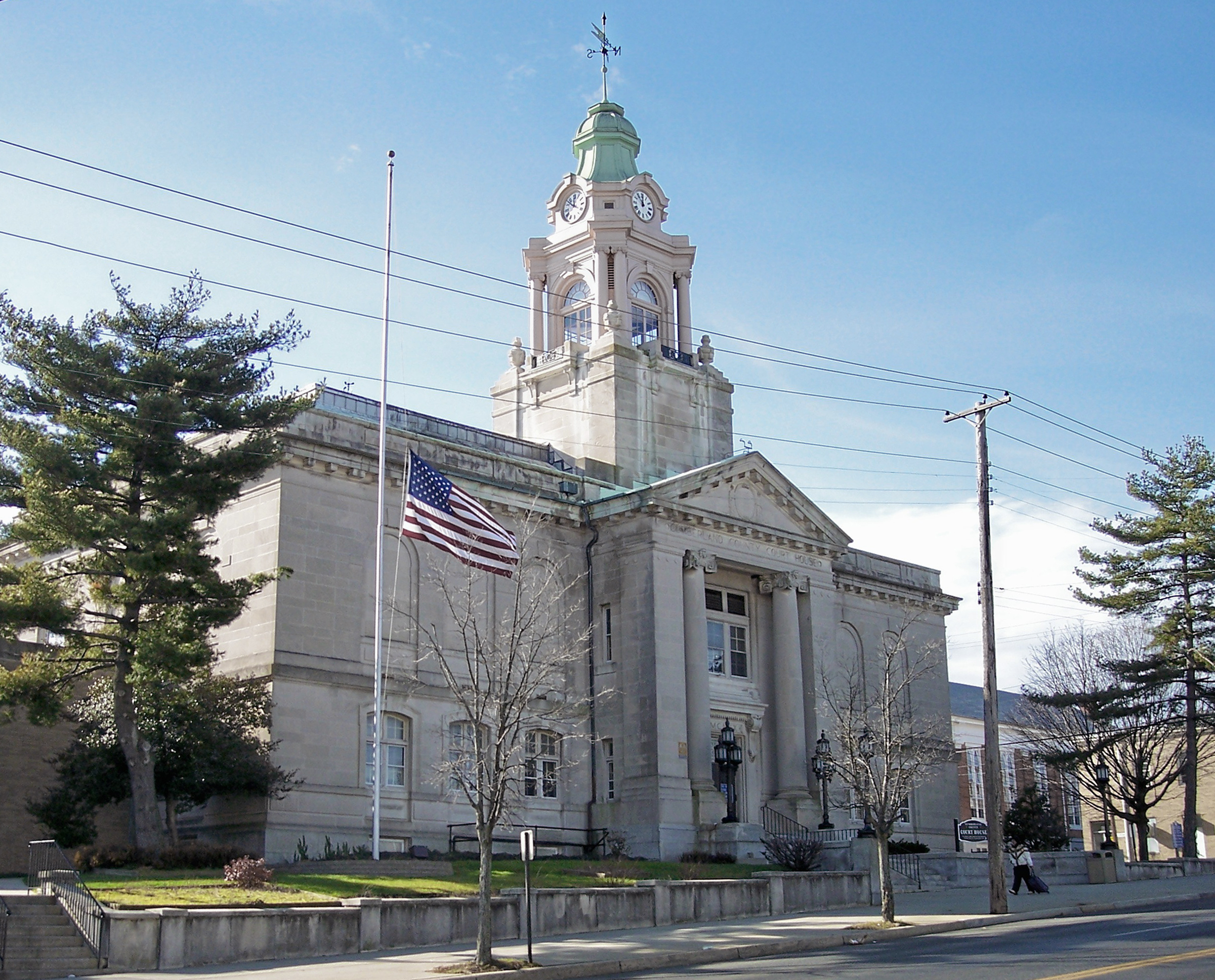
Cumberland County Courthouse in Bridgeton

Cumberland County is governed by a Board of County Commissioners which is comprised of seven members who are elected at large by the citizens of Cumberland County in partisan elections and serve staggered three-year terms in office, with either two or three seats coming up for election each year in a three-year cycle. Each Commissioner is assigned responsibility for one of the county's departments. In 2016, freeholders were paid $15,000 and the freeholder director was paid an annual salary of $16,000.

As of 2025, members of the Cumberland County Board of County Commissioners (with party affiliation, residence, and term-end year listed in parentheses) are (with terms for director and deputy director ending every December 31):

Commissioner	Party, Residence, Term
Robert A. Austino	D, Bridgeton, 2027
Deputy Director Antonio Romero	R, Vineland, 2027
Douglas A. Albrecht	R, Vineland, 2025
Victoria Groetsch-Lods	R, Vineland, 2025
Arthur Marchand	R, Hopewell Township, 2026
James Sauro	R, Vineland, 2026
Sandra Taylor	R, Downe Township, 2026

Pursuant to Article VII Section II of the New Jersey State Constitution, each county in New Jersey has three elected administrative officials known as "constitutional officers." These officers are the County Clerk and County Surrogate (both elected for five-year terms of office) and the County Sheriff (elected for a three-year term). The county's constitutional officers are:

Title	Representative
County Clerk	Celeste Riley (D, Bridgeton, 2029),
Sheriff	Michael Donato (R, Bridgeton, 2026)
Surrogate	Rudolph A. Luisi (R, Vineland, 2028).

The Cumberland County Prosecutor is Jennifer Webb-McRae of Vineland. First nominated by Governor of New Jersey Jon Corzine in January 2010, Webb-McRae was nominated for a second five-year term by Chris Christie in November 2016 and sworn into office after confirmation in January 2017. Cumberland County is a part of Vicinage 15 of the New Jersey Superior Court (along with Gloucester County and Salem County), seated in Woodbury in Gloucester County; the Assignment Judge for the vicinage is Benjamin C. Telsey. The Cumberland County Courthouse is in Bridgeton.

In January 2023, John P. Capizola Jr. was appointed to fill the commissioner seat expiring in December 2023 that had been held by George Castellini until he resigned from office earlier that month.

=== Federal representatives ===
New Jersey's 2nd congressional district includes all of Cumberland County. For the 119th United States Congress, New Jersey's 2nd congressional district is represented by Jeff Van Drew (R, Dennis Township).

=== State representatives ===
The 14 municipalities of Cumberland County are part of two legislative districts.

District	Senate	Assembly	Municipalities
1st	Mike Testa (R)	Antwan McClellan (R) Erik K. Simonsen (R)	Bridgeton, Commercial Township, Downe Township, Fairfield Township, Lawrence Township, Maurice River Township, Millville, and Vineland. The remainder of this district includes portions of Atlantic County & Cape May County.
3rd	John Burzichelli (D)	Heather Simmons (D) Dave Bailey (D)	Deerfield Township, Greenwich Township, Hopewell Township, Shiloh Borough, Stow Creek, Upper Deerfield Township. The remainder of this district includes portions of Gloucester County & Salem County.

=== Law enforcement ===
The New Jersey Department of Corrections operates three correctional facilities in the county: Bayside State Prison, South Woods State Prison, and Southern State Correctional Facility. The three facilities employ 1,500 people and house one of every three state prisoners. In 2007, while the state was preparing to close Riverfront State Prison in Camden, it considered establishing a fourth state prison in Cumberland County.

== Politics ==
United States presidential election results for Cumberland County, New Jersey
Year	Republican		Democratic		Third party(ies)	
Year	No.	%	No.	%	No.	%
1896	7,018	61.09%	3,877	33.75%	593	5.16%
1900	6,780	58.65%	4,036	34.91%	744	6.44%
1904	7,402	64.28%	3,317	28.81%	796	6.91%
1908	6,770	56.56%	4,521	37.77%	679	5.67%
1912	1,895	18.18%	3,858	37.01%	4,671	44.81%
1916	5,692	52.14%	4,573	41.89%	652	5.97%
1920	11,913	68.36%	4,487	25.75%	1,027	5.89%
1924	15,691	71.05%	4,780	21.64%	1,613	7.30%
1928	23,921	77.92%	6,694	21.81%	84	0.27%
1932	16,668	55.61%	12,371	41.28%	932	3.11%
1936	14,500	41.09%	20,492	58.06%	300	0.85%
1940	16,322	45.75%	19,251	53.95%	107	0.30%
1944	14,477	47.91%	15,674	51.87%	67	0.22%
1948	16,556	51.24%	15,195	47.02%	562	1.74%
1952	21,819	53.40%	18,929	46.33%	111	0.27%
1956	24,067	58.07%	17,309	41.76%	68	0.16%
1960	21,283	47.81%	23,199	52.12%	30	0.07%
1964	12,611	27.29%	33,593	72.69%	11	0.02%
1968	18,388	40.42%	21,661	47.62%	5,439	11.96%
1972	26,409	58.18%	18,692	41.18%	291	0.64%
1976	20,535	40.84%	29,165	58.00%	587	1.17%
1980	23,242	50.09%	19,356	41.71%	3,805	8.20%
1984	29,398	57.47%	21,141	41.33%	616	1.20%
1988	26,024	53.83%	21,869	45.23%	456	0.94%
1992	19,253	36.94%	22,220	42.64%	10,643	20.42%
1996	14,744	31.69%	25,444	54.68%	6,345	13.64%
2000	18,882	38.78%	28,188	57.90%	1,614	3.32%
2004	24,362	45.81%	27,875	52.41%	948	1.78%
2008	22,360	38.42%	34,919	60.00%	915	1.57%
2012	20,658	37.31%	34,055	61.51%	656	1.18%
2016	24,453	45.01%	27,771	51.11%	2,107	3.88%
2020	28,952	46.39%	32,742	52.46%	714	1.14%
2024	28,675	51.31%	26,577	47.56%	633	1.13%

Cumberland County tends to be a swing county with Republicans holding most countywide and state legislative offices, as well as the one congressional district that covers the county. Since 1936, the county has voted for the national winner of the presidential election all but five times. It voted Democratic from 1992 to 2020. County margins for Democrats have shrank since peaking in 2012.

In 2012, the county voted for Democrat Barack Obama by 24%. The county shifted 18% rightward from 2012 to 2016, despite the state shifting right by just 4%. In 2020, Democrat Joe Biden only won the county by 6%, even as he won New Jersey by 16%. In 2024, the county voted Republican for the first time since 1988. The county also voted Republican in the concurrent 2024 U.S. Senate election in New Jersey, for the first time since 1972.

As of April 1, 2024 there were a total of 96,165 registered voters in Cumberland County, of whom 31,945 (33.2%) were registered as Democrats, 23,867 (24.8%) were registered as Republicans, and 38,531 (40.1%) were registered as unaffiliated. There were 1,822 voters (1.9%) registered to other parties.

Senate Class 1 election results

United States Senate election results for Cumberland County, New Jersey1
Year	Republican		Democratic		Third party(ies)	
Year	No.	%	No.	%	No.	%
2024	25,441	48.73%	25,186	48.24%	1,583	3.03%
2018	19,244	47.93%	19,386	48.29%	1,517	3.78%
2012	16,795	34.13%	31,367	63.74%	1,051	2.14%
2006	13,537	44.18%	16,243	53.01%	860	2.81%
2000	19,698	45.88%	21,581	50.26%	1,657	3.86%
1994	14,458	47.72%	14,657	48.38%	1,182	3.90%
1988	19,680	42.94%	25,379	55.38%	771	1.68%
1982	14,250	43.48%	17,834	54.42%	689	2.10%

Senate Class 2 election results

United States Senate election results for Cumberland County, New Jersey2
Year	Republican		Democratic		Third party(ies)	
Year	No.	%	No.	%	No.	%
2020	26,626	43.85%	31,992	52.69%	2,102	3.46%
2014	12,455	44.77%	14,830	53.30%	537	1.93%
2013	7,496	47.50%	8,069	51.13%	217	1.37%
2008	18,498	36.34%	31,052	61.00%	1,357	2.67%
2002	13,189	42.34%	17,020	54.64%	943	3.03%
1996	16,886	40.92%	22,129	53.63%	2,246	5.44%
1990	12,765	39.89%	18,186	56.82%	1,053	3.29%
1984	17,738	36.68%	29,520	61.05%	1,097	2.27%

=== State elections ===
Governor election results

Gubernatorial election results for Cumberland County, New Jersey
Year	Republican		Democratic		Third party(ies)	
Year	No.	%	No.	%	No.	%
2025	19,272	47.11%	21,348	52.18%	290	0.71%
2021	17,794	55.65%	13,978	43.72%	201	0.63%
2017	11,876	41.83%	15,686	55.25%	828	2.92%
2013	17,943	56.66%	13,129	41.46%	595	1.88%
2009	14,079	41.75%	17,092	50.69%	2,548	7.56%
2005	12,692	39.05%	18,580	57.16%	1,231	3.79%
2001	13,583	40.31%	19,445	57.71%	668	1.98%
1997	13,651	39.90%	19,977	58.39%	586	1.71%
1993	17,066	46.98%	18,231	50.19%	1,028	2.83%
1989	13,304	35.34%	23,906	63.50%	439	1.17%
1985	21,017	71.85%	7,665	26.20%	570	1.95%
1981	16,109	46.07%	18,460	52.79%	401	1.15%
1977	14,980	45.81%	16,741	51.19%	980	3.00%
1973	15,515	44.97%	18,884	54.73%	102	0.30%
1969	21,348	59.58%	14,340	40.02%	143	0.40%
1965	15,800	44.56%	19,501	54.99%	159	0.45%
1961	15,769	44.79%	19,266	54.73%	169	0.48%
1957	13,663	41.13%	19,520	58.76%	37	0.11%
1953	15,716	51.92%	14,420	47.64%	134	0.44%

== Municipalities ==
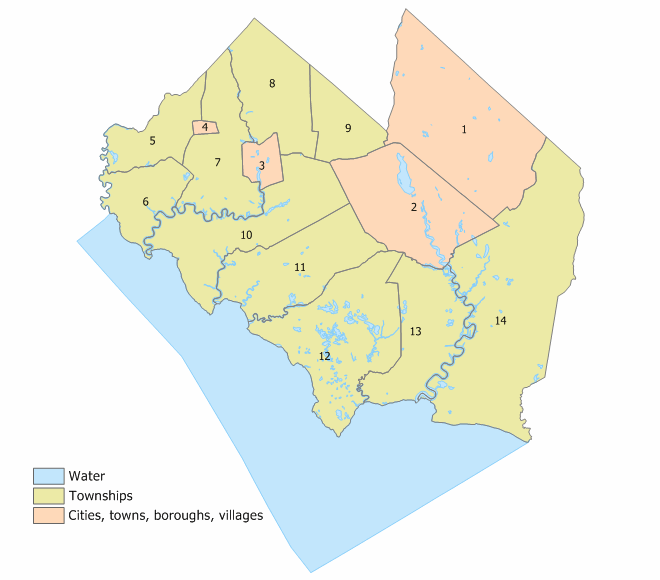
Index map of Cumberland County Municipalities (click to see index key)

1862 map

Interactive map of municipalities in Cumberland County.

The 14 municipalities in Cumberland County (with most 2010 Census data for population, housing units, and area) are:

Municipality (with map key)	Map key	Municipal type	Population	Housing Units	Total Area	Water Area	Land Area	Pop. Density	Housing Density	School District	Communities
Bridgeton	3	city	27,263	6,782	6.43	0.25	6.18	4,102.5	1,097.6	Bridgeton	
Commercial Township	13	township	4,669	2,115	34.44	2.31	32.13	161.2	65.8	Millville (9-12) (S/R); Commercial Township (PK-8)	Buckshutem; Laurel Lake CDP (2,861); Mauricetown CDP (403); Money Island CDP (22); Newport CDP (487); Port Norris CDP (1,111)
Deerfield Township	9	township	3,136	1,143	16.80	0.03	16.76	186.1	68.2	Cumberland Regional (9-12); Deerfield Township (PK-8)	Rosenhayn CDP (1,150)
Downe Township	12	township	1,399	996	54.27	5.66	48.61	32.6	20.5	Bridgeton (9-12) (S/R); Downe Township (PK-8)	Dividing Creek CDP (345); Fortescue CDP (189); Gandys Beach CDP (25); Newport
Fairfield Township	10	township	5,546	2,058	43.95	2.69	41.26	152.6	49.9	Cumberland Regional (9-12); Fairfield Township (PK-8)	Fairton CDP (1,060); Gouldtown CDP (1,601); Sea Breeze
Greenwich Township	6	township	771	369	18.83	1.00	17.84	45.1	20.7	Cumberland Regional (9-12); Greenwich Township (K-8)	Greenwich CDP (251); Othello CDP (132); Sheppards Mill CDP (part; 131); Springtown
Hopewell Township	7	township	4,391	1,741	30.83	0.95	29.87	153.0	58.3	Cumberland Regional (9-12); Hopewell Township (K-8)	Bowentown; Dutch Neck CDP (123); Lakeside-Beebe Run CDP (403); Roadstown CDP (part; 155); Sheppards Mill CDP (part; 131); West Park CDP (1,506)
Lawrence Township	11	township	3,087	1,221	38.33	1.41	36.92	89.1	33.1	Bridgeton (9-12) (S/R); Millville (9-12) (S/R); Lawrence Township (PK-8)	Cedarville CDP (702); Centre Grove CDP (1,281)
Maurice River Township	14	township	6,218	1,506	95.76	2.65	93.11	85.7	16.2	Millville (9-12) (S/R); Maurice River Township (PK-8)	Cumberland; Cumberland-Hesstown CDP (315); Delmont CDP (122); Dorchester CDP (291); Heislerville CDP (227); Leesburg CDP (601); Milmay CDP (part; 919); Port Elizabeth CDP (290)
Millville	2	city	27,491	11,435	44.49	2.49	42.00	676.2	272.3	Millville	
Shiloh	4	borough	444	214	1.21	0.00	1.21	427.3	177.2	Cumberland Regional (9-12); Hopewell Township (K-8) (S/R)	
Stow Creek Township	5	township	1,312	568	18.85	0.55	18.30	78.2	31.0	Cumberland Regional (9-12); Stow Creek (K-8)	Arrowhead Lake CDP (126); Jericho; Marlboro CDP (127); Roadstown CDP (part; 155)
Upper Deerfield Township	8	township	7,645	3,025	31.27	0.18	31.10	246.3	97.3	Cumberland Regional (9-12); Upper Deerfield Township (PK-8)	Carlls Corner CDP (911); Deerfield Street CDP (230); Laurel Heights CDP (380); Seabrook; Seabrook Farms CDP (1,508); Seeley CDP (152); Silver Lake CDP (1,435); Sunset Lake CDP (494)
Vineland	1	city	60,780	22,661	69.03	0.61	68.42	887.5	331.2	Vineland	
Cumberland County		county	154,152	55,834	677.62	193.92	483.70	324.4	115.4		

== Transportation ==
=== Airports ===
The following public-use airports are located in Cumberland County:

- Bucks Airport (00N) in Bridgeton
- Millville Municipal Airport (MIV) in Millville
- Kroelinger Airport (29N) in Vineland

=== Roads and highways ===
As of 2010, the county had a total of 1,271.74 miles (2,046.67 km) of roadways, of which 643.65 miles (1,035.85 km) were maintained by the local municipality, 539.14 miles (867.66 km) by Cumberland County and 88.95 miles (143.15 km) by the New Jersey Department of Transportation.

Cumberland is served only by state and county routes. Major county routes that pass through include County Route 540, County Route 548 (only in Maurice River Township), County Route 550, County Route 552, County Route 553, and County Route 555.

State routes include Route 47, Route 49, Route 55, Route 56, Route 77, and Route 347. Route 55 is the only limited-access road in the county which provides access to Interstate 76, Interstate 295, and the Philadelphia area to the north.

== Parks and recreation ==
The only YMCA in the county is the Cumberland Cape Atlantic YMCA in Vineland. In 2001, the board of directors of what was the Vineland YMCA changed the name to include Atlantic County and Cape May County as the members wanted the Vineland YMCA to reflect a wider group of communities.

=== Winery ===
- Cedar Rose Vineyards

== Education ==
School districts include:

K-12

- Bridgeton Public Schools
- Millville Public Schools
- Salem County Special Services School District
- Vineland Public Schools

Secondary

- Cumberland County Vocational School District
- Cumberland Regional School District

Elementary

- Commercial Township School District
- Deerfield Township School District
- Downe Township School District
- Fairfield Township School District
- Greenwich Township School District
- Hopewell Township School District
- Lawrence Township School District
- Maurice River Township School District
- Stow Creek School District
- Upper Deerfield Township Schools

== See also ==
- National Register of Historic Places listings in Cumberland County, New Jersey
