= Aviation in the New York metropolitan area =

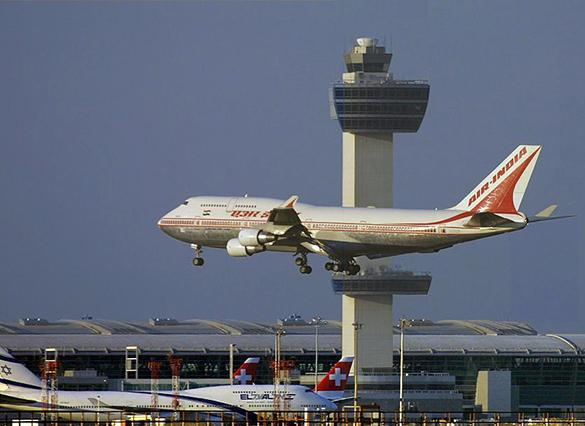
An Air India Boeing 747-400 arrives at John F. Kennedy International Airport, with El Al Israel and Swiss International jets at Terminal 4 in 2004. JFK is the largest entry point for international arrivals to the United States.

The New York metropolitan area has the busiest airport system in the United States and the second-busiest in the world after London. It is the country's most frequently used port of entry and departure for international flights.

The metro area has three major airports: John F. Kennedy International Airport (JFK), LaGuardia Airport (LGA), and Newark Liberty International Airport (EWR), all operated since 1947 by the Port Authority of New York and New Jersey. In 2024, they were used by more than 146.1 million passengers. With 142.7 million passengers, 2025 was the third busiest year, just behind 2023 (143.8 million passengers). Until October 2022, the three shared the International Air Transport Association airport code (IATA code) "NYC"; Newark only uses EWR as of the change. JFK and Newark are connected to regional rail systems by AirTrain JFK and AirTrain Newark respectively.

The class B airspace used by the three airports is extremely congested. The Federal Aviation Administration (FAA) limits the number of flights per hour but they rank among the top five airports in the United States for delays.

The area also includes several satellite or reliever airports that provide commercial air carrier service on a much smaller scale as well as numerous general aviation airports, heliports, and seaplane bases.

== History ==
Teterboro Airport is the oldest operating airport in the New York metropolitan area. Walter C. Teter (1863–1929) acquired the property in 1917. While other localities had municipal airports, New York City itself had a multitude of private airfields, and thus did not see the need for a municipal airport until the late 1920s. Flushing Airport opened in 1927, quickly becoming the city's busiest airport; it closed in 1984. Newark Liberty International Airport opened in 1928. It was followed in 1930 by Floyd Bennett Field: New York City's first municipal airport, built largely to serve the growth of commercial aviation after World War I. LaGuardia Airport was opened in 1939, and Floyd Bennett Field was closed for general aviation two years later. John F. Kennedy International Airport opened as Idlewild Airport in 1948.

From the 1940s through the 1970s, many airlines provided ticketing, baggage, and airport ground transportation services at remote terminals located in Manhattan. The need for remote terminals arose because at that time airlines were competing with traditional forms of transportation (e.g., railroads) that operated between city centers and there were limitations in passenger processing capacity and parking supply at airports. The 42nd Street Airlines Terminal opened in 1941 on Park Avenue across from Grand Central Terminal. Traffic congestion on streets in the area of the 42nd Street Airlines Terminal led to the opening of the East Side Airlines Terminal in 1953 to provide service to Idlewild and La Guardia airports from its location near the entrance to the Queens–Midtown Tunnel and the opening of the West Side Airlines Terminal in 1955 to provide service to Newark Airport from its location near the entrance to the Lincoln Tunnel. After the opening of these new remote terminals the 42nd Street Airlines Terminal was renamed the Airlines Building and became a ticketing-only facility. By the early 1970s, there was less need for remote terminals because most airlines had acquired better ticketing and baggage handling facilities at the airports and more air passengers were traveling to or from the suburbs rather than having trip origins or destinations in Manhattan. The West Side Airlines Terminal closed in 1972, the Airlines Building was demolished in 1978, and the East Side Airlines Terminal closed in 1984.

The Aviation Hall of Fame and Museum of New Jersey, Cradle of Aviation Museum, Marine Air Terminal and Newark Metropolitan Airport Buildings preserve the history of aviation in the New York metro area.

== Incidents ==
- September 11 attacks
- Airliner accidents and incidents in New York City
- Airliner accidents and incidents in New Jersey

== Airspace ==
The vast majority of airspace above the metropolitan area is controlled by the Federal Aviation Administration (FAA) and split into complex sectors that organize the flow of flights to and from the area's many airports, as well as transitory air traffic between neighboring regions.

- New York Air Route Traffic Control Center (ZNY) in Ronkonkoma, Long Island, is one of 22 Air Route Traffic Control Centers (ARTCC) in the United States. It is responsible for high-altitude traffic above the New York Metropolitan Area and Philadelphia/Delaware Valley metro area, as well as 3,250,000 square miles (8,400,000 km^{2}) of oceanic airspace. The unit was located at JFK Airport until July 1963, when it moved to a purpose-built site in Suffolk County that was designed to resist a nuclear attack.
- New York TRACON (N90), located in Westbury, Long Island, is one of seven large terminal radar approach control units in the United States. It handles air traffic in southern New York State and southeastern Connecticut.
- Philadelphia TRACON as of July 2024 handles air traffic for Northern New Jersey airports.
- VFR corridors

Flights under visual flight rules (VFR) are allowed in the East River VFR corridor and the Hudson River VFR corridor, which extend north from the Verrazzano–Narrows Bridge. The Hudson River corridor allows VFR flight between Manhattan and the New Jersey Hudson Waterfront north to the Alpine Tower just north of New York City. The East River corridor ends southwest of LGA airspace at the northern end of Roosevelt Island.

As of 2014, about 1% of flights to the Port Authority-controlled airports use the Next Generation Air Transportation System, which relies on the Global Positioning System instead of radar.

== Major commercial airports ==
=== John F. Kennedy International Airport ===
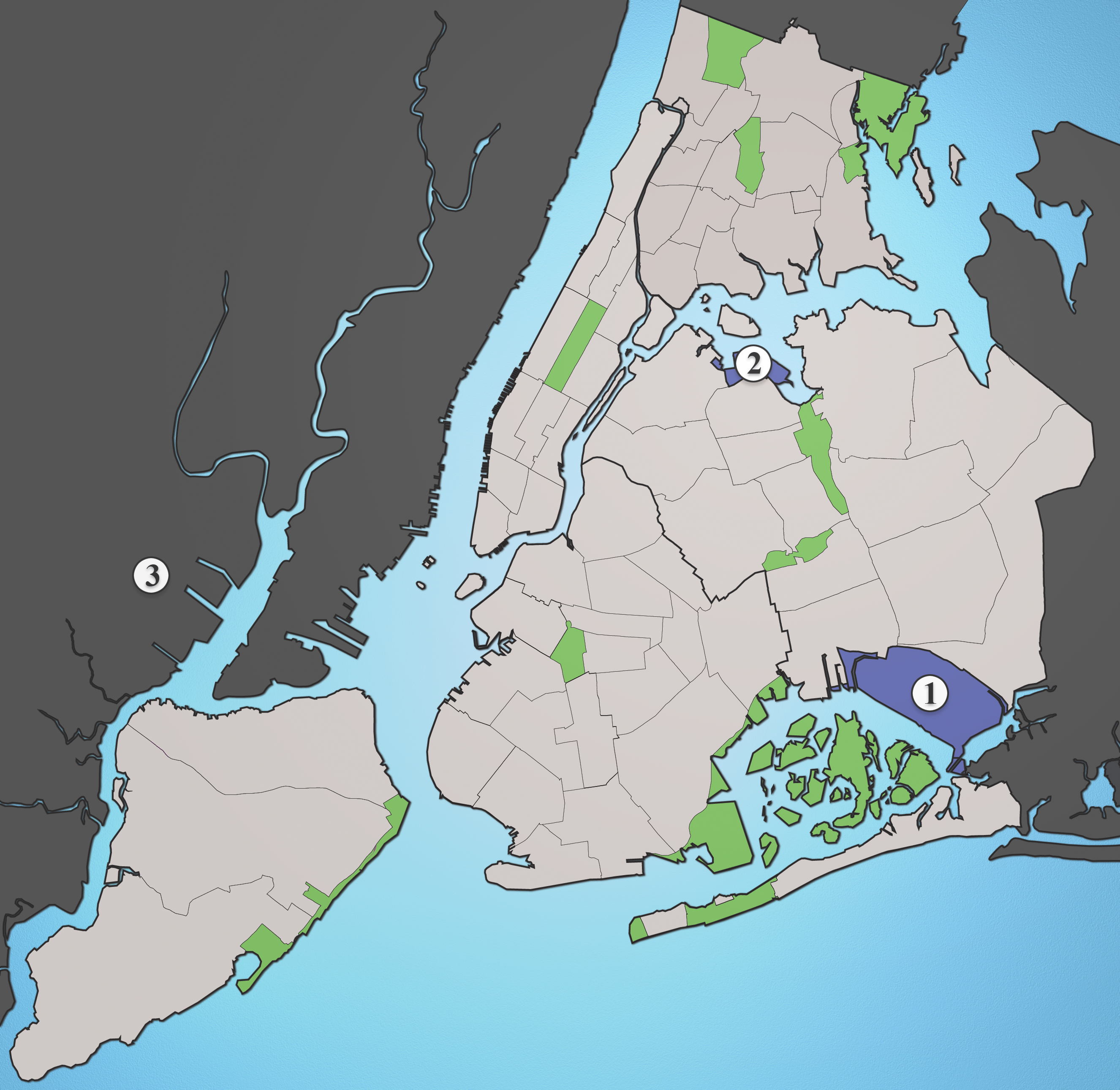
Location of the three largest airports in the area: 1) John F. Kennedy 2) LaGuardia 3) Newark Liberty

John F. Kennedy International Airport (JFK) is the major entry point for international arrivals in the United States, and it is the largest international air freight gateway in the nation by value of shipments. Sections of the airport have been a foreign trade zone since 1984. About 100 airlines from more than 50 countries operate flights to JFK. The JFK–London Heathrow route is the leading U.S. international airport pair with over 2.9 million passengers in 2000. Other top international destinations from JFK are Charles de Gaulle Airport in Paris, Incheon International Airport in Seoul, Barajas Airport in Madrid, Ben Gurion International Airport in Tel Aviv, Cibao International Airport in Santiago de los Caballeros, Las Américas International Airport in Santo Domingo, Frankfurt Airport in Frankfurt, Narita and Tokyo International Airports in Tokyo, Changi Airport in Singapore, and Guarulhos International Airport in São Paulo. The airport is located along Jamaica Bay near Howard Beach, Queens. The elevated AirTrain JFK people mover system connects JFK to the New York City Subway and the Long Island Rail Road.

=== LaGuardia Airport ===
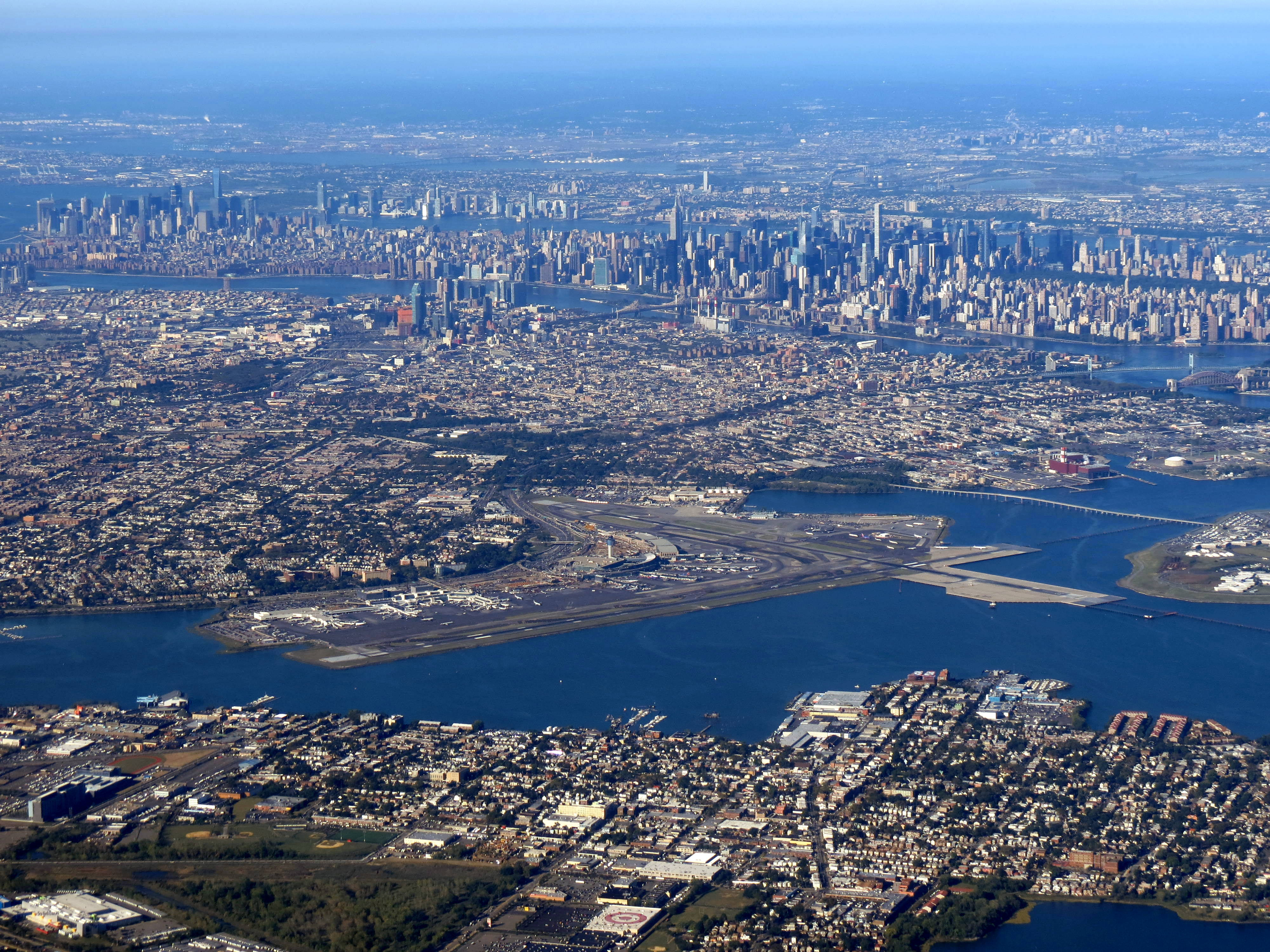
Aerial view of LaGuardia Airport with Manhattan in the background in September 2016

LaGuardia Airport (LGA), the smallest of the New York area's primary airports, handles domestic air service and flights to Canada. It is named for Fiorello H. La Guardia, the city's Depression-era mayor known as a reformist and strong supporter of the New Deal. The airport is located in northern Queens, about 6 miles (9.7 km) from downtown Manhattan.

In 1984, a "perimeter rule" was introduced to reduce congestion, which prohibits incoming and outgoing flights that exceed 1,500 miles (2,400 km) except on Saturdays, when the ban is lifted, and to Denver, Colorado, which has a grandfathered exemption. As a result, most transcontinental and international flights use JFK and Newark (although there are short-haul international flights to the Canadian cities of Toronto, Montreal and Ottawa). The LGA-Toronto-Pearson route is the leading US international pair by number of flights, with 17,038 flights in 2019.

Plans were announced in July 2015 to entirely rebuild LaGuardia Airport in a multibillion-dollar project to replace its aging facilities; this project would also accommodate a new AirTrain LaGuardia connection.

=== Newark Liberty International Airport ===
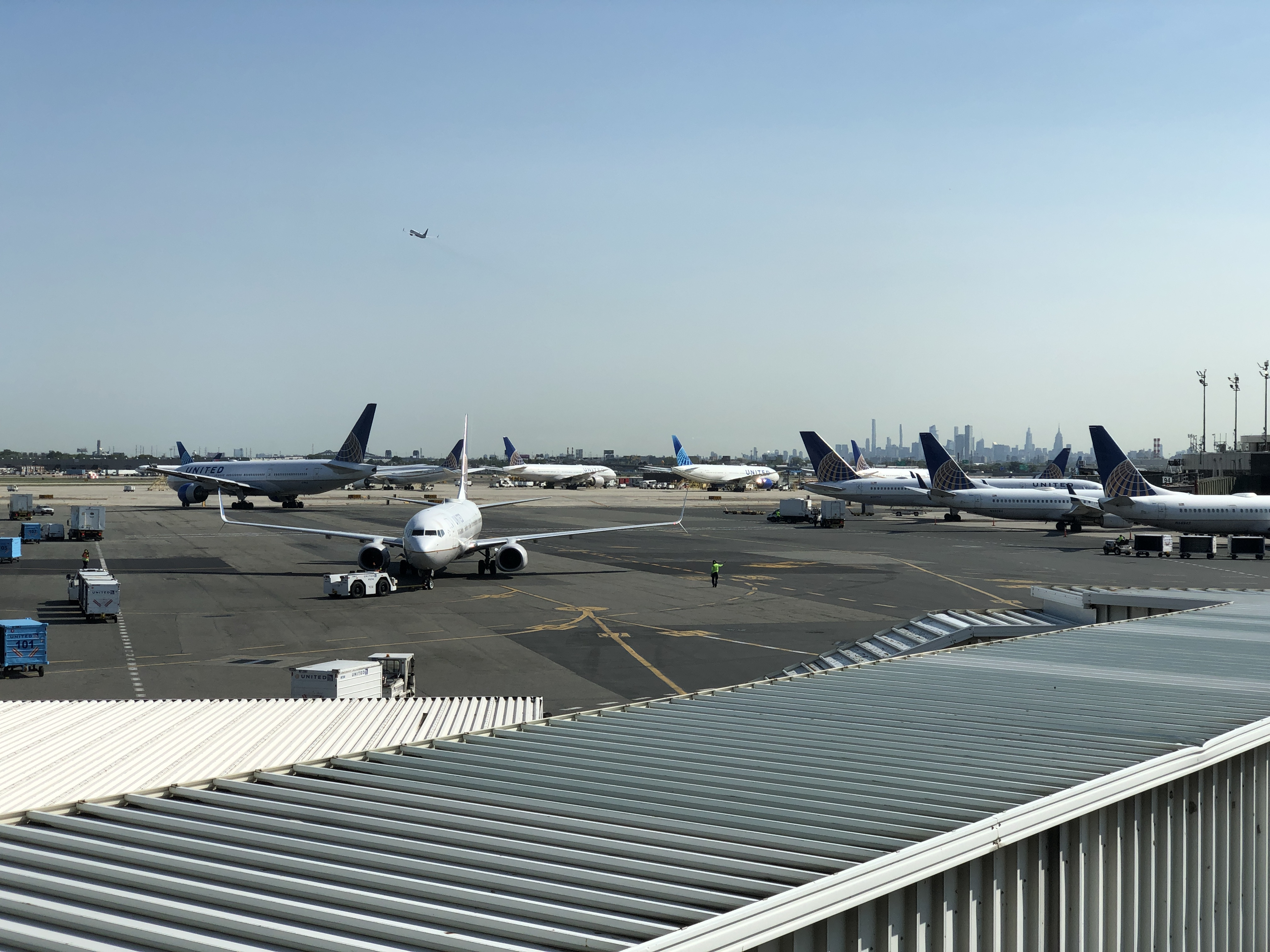
View of Manhattan in the distance from Newark Liberty International Airport with many United Airlines aircraft operating in September 2022

Opened in 1928, Newark Liberty International Airport (EWR) is considered the first major commercial airport in North America. Amelia Earhart dedicated the Newark Metropolitan Airport Administration Building in 1935. It is the fifth busiest international air gateway. From 2003, Newark became the terminus of the world's longest non-stop scheduled airline route, Continental's service to Hong Kong International Airport by United Airlines and Cathay Pacific in 2014 respectively.

In 2004, Singapore Airlines broke Continental's record by starting direct 18-hour flights to Singapore. The airport is located in Newark, New Jersey, about 12 miles (19 km) west of downtown Manhattan. The top three international destinations from Newark are London, Toronto and Tel Aviv. It connects to NJ Transit commuter trains and Amtrak intercity trains via the AirTrain Newark monorail. In 2022, the International Air Transport Association removed Newark from the NYC city code.

== Other commercial airports ==
=== Long Island MacArthur Airport ===
Long Island MacArthur Airport (ISP), otherwise known as Islip Airport, is located in Ronkonkoma, New York, in Suffolk County, about 44 miles (71 km) east of Manhattan. It is owned and operated by the Town of Islip, and has been designated by the FAA an official New York airport. This airport is primarily served by low-cost carriers Southwest Airlines, JetBlue, Frontier Airlines, and Breeze Airways to domestic destinations mostly in the southeast.

=== Stewart International Airport ===
Stewart International Airport (SWF) is located about 60 miles (97 km) northwest of the city in Orange County, New York. In 2007, the Port Authority of New York and New Jersey took control of operations at Stewart and has committed $500 million to its upgrade and expansion. From June 2017 to September 2019 Stewart was the only secondary airport in the New York metro area offering flights to Europe. This was enabled by a main runway of over 11,000 feet.

=== Westchester County Airport ===
Westchester County Airport (HPN) is located in and owned by Westchester County, New York, about 33 miles (53 km) north of the city, along the border with Connecticut. It sees service to a dozen destinations, and has seen increases of nearly 100,000 enplanements in the period from 2008 to 2010.

== General aviation airports ==
=== Republic Airport ===
Republic Airport (FRG) is a general aviation reliever airport located in East Farmingdale, Long Island, on the border of Nassau and Suffolk counties. It is the busiest general aviation airport in the New York Metropolitan region, primarily serving Long Island and is owned by the New York State Department of Transportation, who contracts its operation to a third-party. The airport is about 28 miles (45 km) from midtown Manhattan.

=== Teterboro Airport ===
Teterboro Airport (TEB) is a general aviation reliever airport located in the Boroughs of Teterboro, Moonachie, and Hasbrouck Heights in Bergen County, New Jersey. It is owned by the Port Authority of New York and New Jersey, who contracts its operation to a third-party company. The airport is 12 miles (19 km) from midtown Manhattan in the New Jersey Meadowlands, which makes it very popular for private and corporate aircraft.

=== Additional general aviation airports ===
In addition, there are many smaller general aviation airports, as well as several seaplane bases in the port district and the adjoining region. Among them are:

- Brookhaven Airport (HWV)
- Central Jersey Regional Airport (JVI)
- Danbury Municipal Airport (DXR)
- Essex County Airport (CDW)
- Greenwood Lake Airport (4N1)
- Hackettstown Airport (N05)
- Hudson Valley Regional Airport (POU)
- Igor I. Sikorsky Memorial Airport (BDR)
- Lincoln Park Airport (N07)
- Linden Airport (LDJ)
- Little Ferry Seaplane Base (2N7)
- Meriden Markham Municipal Airport (MMK)
- Monmouth Executive Airport (BLM)
- Morristown Municipal Airport (MMU)
- New York Skyports Inc. Seaplane Base (QNY)
- Newton Airport (New Jersey) (3N5)
- Old Bridge Airport (3N6)
- Princeton Airport (39N)
- Sands Point Seaplane Base (7N3)
- Solberg–Hunterdon Airport (N51)
- Somerset Airport (SMQ)
- Trenton–Robbinsville Airport (N87)
- Waterbury–Oxford Airport (OXC)

== Heliports ==
There are numerous heliports in the New York metro area. Three of the busiest are in Manhattan:

- Downtown Manhattan Heliport (JRB), at the eastern end of Wall Street on Pier 6, on the East River, was the first heliport in the United States to be certified for scheduled passenger helicopter service by the FAA. Also known as the Downtown Skyport, it is the normal landing spot for US presidents visiting New York. The soundproof terminal contains gift shops, administrative offices, a VIP lounge and general passenger waiting area, as well as X-ray and bomb-detection machines at a security checkpoint.
- East 34th Street Heliport (6N5) has a terminal building and fuel station; it averages 20,000 take-offs and landings each year.
- West 30th Street Heliport (JRA) opened on September 26, 1956, and three months later began hosting scheduled passenger flights by New York Airways, the first airline flights to Manhattan.

A heliport operated from the roof of the Pan Am Building in midtown Manhattan from 1965 through 1968 and again for a short period in 1977, before a fatal accident caused it to close. In 1968, the East 60th Street Heliport was opened to divert general aviation aircraft from the major commercial airports to smaller airfields (such as Teterboro), where passengers could board a helicopter and travel onward to Midtown Manhattan; the heliport was shut down in the late 1990s amid noise and safety concerns.

== Seaplanes ==
Seaplane bases in the New York metropolitan area include:

- New York Skyports Seaplane Base
- Sands Point Seaplane Base

From 1934 to the mid-1980s, Wall Street Skyport served as a seaplane base that was primarily used by suburban commuters working in the Financial District of Lower Manhattan. Since 2015, New Jersey has largely prohibited the use of seaplanes on navigable waters.

== Capacity and delays ==
An average of 40% of passenger aircraft delays in the U.S. originated in the New York metropolitan area, some in the area and others due to cascading effects. One-third of aircraft in the national airspace system move through the New York area at some point during a typical day. The three major airports rank among the worst airports for delays in the U.S. despite FAA caps limiting the number of takeoffs and landings per hour to 83 at both JFK and EWR and 71 at LGA. While an increased demand for passengers and freight is foreseen, limited land availability in the heavily urbanized area and prohibitive costs constrict expansion of JFK, EWR, and LGA. Approaches to mitigate delays and increase capacity include costly runway expansion projects and greater use of reliever airports. Before the establishment of the Great Swamp National Wildlife Refuge in 1960, the PANYNJ had proposed to build an airport at the location in Morris County, New Jersey but was widely opposed. Studies conducted by the Federal Aviation Administration, the Regional Plan Association, the PANYNJ, and others have identified few sites within the region that would satisfy the requirements for a major airport and evaluated potential dispersion of flights to outlying commercial airports, including Atlantic City International Airport (ACY), Lehigh Valley International Airport (ABE), Bradley International Airport (BDL), and Tweed New Haven Regional Airport (HVN). In July 2013, the PANYNJ took control of ACY.

== Defunct airports ==
The first municipal airport in New York City was Floyd Bennett Field, developed to lure business away from Newark, but it was ultimately unsuccessful as a general aviation airport and became a Naval Air Station in 1941. It is now part of Gateway National Recreation Area. The New York City Police Department leases facilities for their helicopter operations from the National Park Service.

Flushing Airport was another early airport in New York City. It opened in 1927 and was the busiest airport in New York for a time. A decade later it was overshadowed by the larger LaGuardia Airport located nearby. The airport was decommissioned in 1984 after a fatal accident in 1977. Now the area is wetlands owned by the New York City Economic Development Corporation.

Holmes Airport existed in the Jackson Heights section of Queens from 1929 until 1940. It was put out of business by competition from the new LaGuardia Airport, nearby. Naval Air Station Rockaway near Fort Tilden and Miller Field on the South Shore of Staten Island were military airfields facing Lower New York Bay. Rockaway was active in the 1920s, and Miller from 1921 until 1969. Both are part of Gateway National Recreation Area.

== See also ==
- List of airports in Connecticut
- List of airports in New Jersey
- List of airports in New York
- Transportation in New York City
