= List of airports in New Jersey =

This is a list of airports in New Jersey (a U.S. state), grouped by type and sorted by location. It contains all public-use and military airports in the state. Some private-use and former airports may be included where notable, such as airports that were previously public-use, those with commercial enplanements recorded by the FAA or airports assigned an IATA airport code.

== Airports ==
This list contains the following information:

- **City served** – The city generally associated with the airport, as per the airport's master record with the Federal Aviation Administration. This is not always the actual location since some airports are located in smaller towns outside of the city they serve. It is not meant to be a complete list of cities served, which can be found in or added to each airport's Wikipedia article.
- **FAA** – The location identifier assigned by the Federal Aviation Administration (FAA). These are linked to each airport's page at the New Jersey Department of Transportation (NJDOT) Airport Directory (PDF files ranging in size from 537 to 893 kilobytes).
- **IATA** – The airport code assigned by the International Air Transport Association (IATA). Those that do not match the FAA code are shown in bold.
- **ICAO** – The location indicator assigned by the International Civil Aviation Organization (ICAO).
- **Airport name** – The official airport name. Those shown in **bold** indicate the airport has scheduled passenger service on commercial airlines.
- **Role** – One of four FAA airport categories, as per the 2021–2025 National Plan of Integrated Airport Systems (NPIAS) report released September 2020:
  - P-s: Commercial service – primary are publicly owned airports that receive scheduled passenger service and have more than 10,000 passenger boardings (enplanements) each year. Each primary airport is sub-classified by the FAA as one of the following four "hub" types (s):
    - L: Large hub that accounts for at least 1% of total U.S. passenger enplanements.
    - M: Medium hub that accounts for between 0.25% and 1% of total U.S. passenger enplanements.
    - S: Small hub that accounts for between 0.05% and 0.25% of total U.S. passenger enplanements.
    - N: Nonhub that accounts for less than 0.05% of total U.S. passenger enplanements, but more than 10,000 annual enplanements.
  - CS: Commercial service – nonprimary are publicly owned airports that receive scheduled passenger service and have at least 2,500 passenger boardings each year.
  - R: Reliever airports are designated by the FAA to relieve congestion at a large commercial service airport and to provide more general aviation access to the overall community.
  - GA: General aviation airports are the largest single group of airports in the U.S. airport system. They are public-use airports that do not have scheduled service or have scheduled service with less than 2,500 passenger boardings each year.
- **Enplanements** – The number of enplanements (commercial passenger boardings) that occurred at the airport in calendar year 2024, as per FAA records released October 2025.

City served	FAA	IATA	ICAO	Airport name	Role	Enplanements (2024)
				**Commercial service – primary airports**		
Atlantic City	ACY	ACY	KACY	**Atlantic City International Airport**	P-S	489,848
Newark	EWR	EWR	KEWR	**Newark Liberty International Airport**	P-L	24,544,320
Trenton	TTN	TTN	KTTN	**Trenton–Mercer Airport**	P-N	241,950
				**Reliever airports**		
Belmar / Farmingdale	BLM	BLM	KBLM	Monmouth Executive Airport (was Allaire Airport)	R	421
Caldwell	CDW	CDW	KCDW	Essex County Airport	R	134
Hillsborough	47N			Central Jersey Regional Airport	R	0
Lincoln Park	N07			Lincoln Park Airport	R	0
Linden	LDJ	LDJ	KLDJ	Linden Airport	R	4
Morristown	MMU	MMU	KMMU	Morristown Municipal Airport	R	3,178
Mount Holly	VAY	**LLY**	KVAY	South Jersey Regional Airport	R	50
Princeton / Rocky Hill	39N	**PCT**		Princeton Airport	R	114
Readington	N51			Solberg–Hunterdon Airport	R	0
Robbinsville	N87			Trenton–Robbinsville Airport	R	0
Somerville	SMQ		KSMQ	Somerset Airport	R	24
Sussex	FWN		KFWN	Sussex Airport	R	0
Teterboro	TEB	TEB	KTEB	Teterboro Airport	R	14,411
				**General aviation airports**		
Hammonton	N81			Hammonton Municipal Airport	GA	0
Lakewood	N12			Lakewood Airport	GA	0
Millville	MIV	MIV	KMIV	Millville Municipal Airport	GA	12
Ocean City	26N			Ocean City Municipal Airport	GA	12
Toms River	MJX	MJX	KMJX	Ocean County Airport	GA	12
West Milford	4N1			Greenwood Lake Airport	GA	0
Wildwood	WWD	WWD	KWWD	Cape May Airport (Cape May County Airport)	GA	29
Woodbine	OBI		KOBI	Woodbine Municipal Airport	GA	12
				**Other public-use airports** (not listed in NPIAS)		
Andover	12N			Aeroflex–Andover Airport (Aeroflex–Andover Field)		
Berlin	19N			Camden County Airport		67
Blairstown	1N7			Blairstown Airport		4
Bridgeton	00N			Bucks Airport		
Cross Keys	17N			Cross Keys Airport		10
Hackettstown	N05			Hackettstown Airport		
Jobstown	2N6			Redwing Airport		
Little Ferry	2N7			Little Ferry Seaplane Base		
Lumberton	N14			Flying W Airport		
Old Bridge	3N6			Old Bridge Airport		
Pedricktown	7N7			Oldmans Township Airport		
Pittstown	N85			Alexandria Airport (Alexandria Field)		
Pittstown	N40			Sky Manor Airport		
Vincentown	N73			Red Lion Airport		
Vineland	29N			Kroelinger Airport		
Vineland	28N			Vineland–Downstown Airport		
West Creek	31E			Eagles Nest Airport		26
Williamstown	C01			Southern Cross Airport		
				**Other military airports**		
Lakehurst	NEL	NEL	KNEL	NAES Lakehurst (Maxfield Field)		
Wrightstown	WRI	WRI	KWRI	McGuire Air Force Base		2,282
				**Notable private-use airports**		
Clarksboro	NJ25			Hollingshead Airport		
Flemington	NJ29			Bradford Field		
Pemberton	3NJ1			Pemberton Airport (public-use until 2006, was FAA: 3N7)		
				**Notable former airports**		
Asbury Park	ARX	ARX		Asbury Park Neptune Airport (closed 1977)		
Atlantic City	AIY	AIY	KAIY	Atlantic City Municipal Airport (Bader Field) (closed 2006)		
Bridgeton	N50			Li Calzi Airport (Li Calzi Airpark) (closed 2011?)		
Andover	13N			Trinca Airport		
Hanover				East Hanover Airport (closed 1984)		
Matawan	2N8			Marlboro Airport (closed 2002)		
Newton	3N5			Newton Airport		
Pennington	N75			Twin Pine Airport (closed 2008)		
Philadelphia				Camden Central Airport (closed 1957)		
Princeton	N21			Forrestal Airport (closed 1989?)		
Vineland	25N			Rudy's Airport (closed 2005)		
Williamstown	80N			Piney Hollow Airfield (closed)		
Colts Neck	N61			Colts Neck Airport (closed 1988)		

== See also ==
- New Jersey World War II Army Airfields
- Aviation in the New York metropolitan area
