= Hadley Field =

Former airport in South Plainfield, New Jersey, United States (1924–1928)

Coordinates: 40.5559°N 74.4298°W

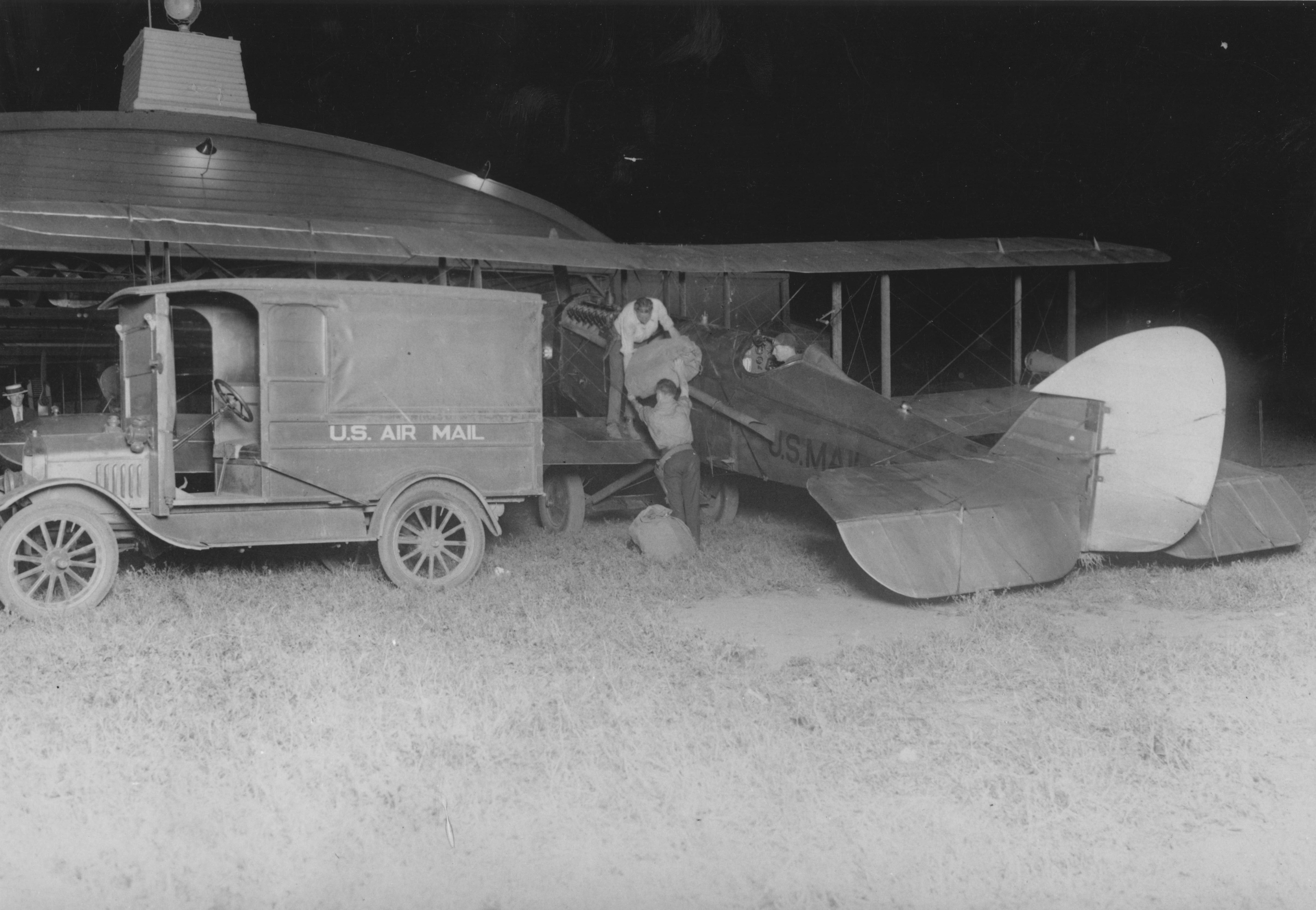
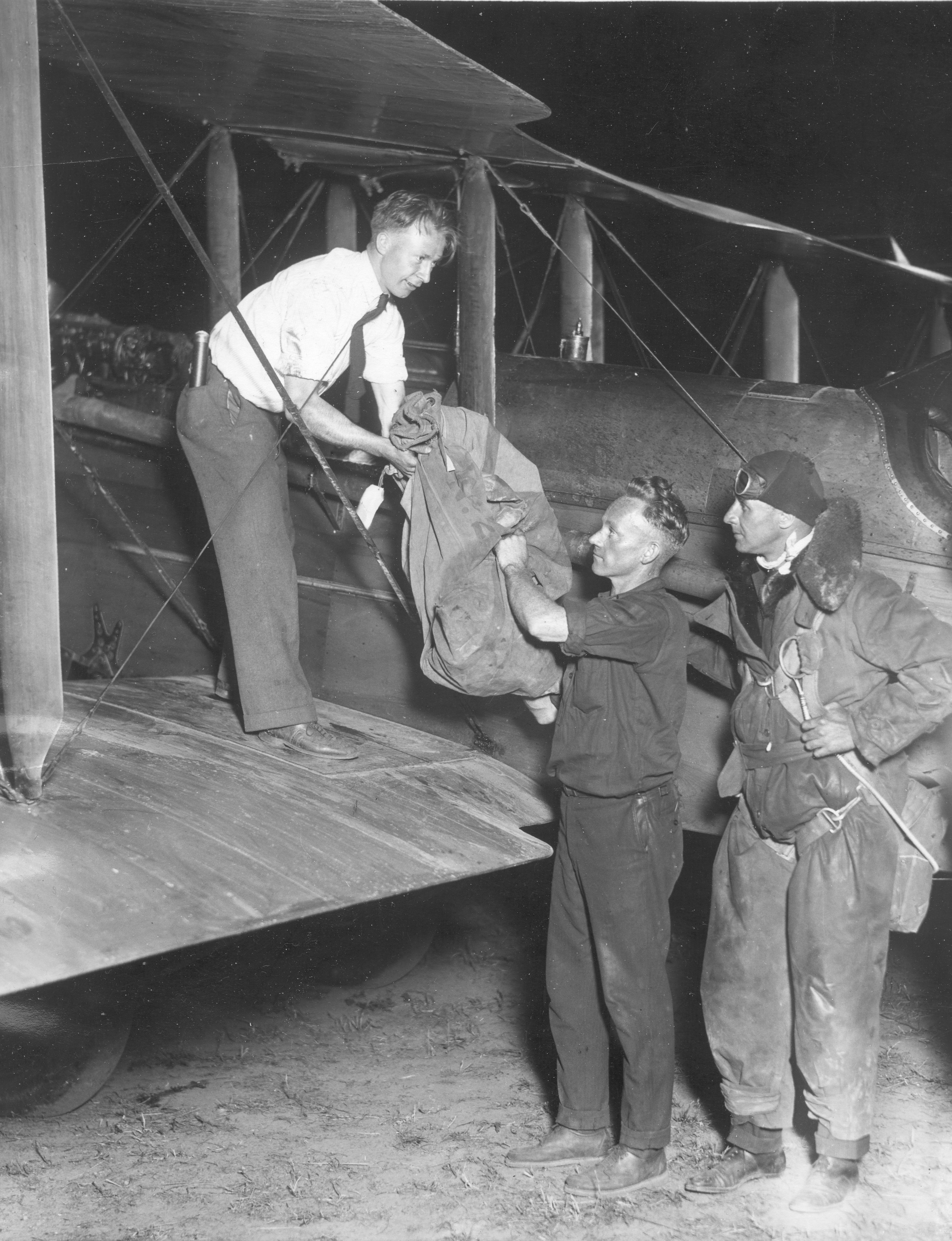
Postal employees transferring airmail to and off airplanes (left and right, respectively) at Hadley Field in July 1925.

Hadley Field was an airport in South Plainfield, in Middlesex County, New Jersey, United States. It contained the Nike Missile Battery NY-65 and was used as a landing site for some of the nation's early air mail service. Hadley Field opened in 1924, and closed in 1928 when Newark Metropolitan Airport opened. The site has since been redeveloped into a strip mall and is currently owned by National Realty and Development Corp.

== See also ==
- Aviation in the New York metropolitan area
- List of airports in New Jersey
