= N61 =

N61 may refer to:

- N61 road (Ireland)
- N61 road (Netherlands)
- Roxas Boulevard, in Manila, Philippines
- Nebraska Highway 61, in the United States
- Colts Neck Airport, a former airport in the United States
