= N87 =

N87 may refer to:

- N87 (Long Island bus)
- HMS Una (N87), a submarine of the Royal Navy
- London Buses route N87
- N87 road (Ireland)
- Nebraska Highway 87, in the United States
- Trenton–Robbinsville Airport, in Mercer County, New Jersey, United States
