= KBLM =

KBLM may refer to:

- Monmouth Executive Airport (ICAO code KBLM)
- KBLM-LP, a defunct low-power television station (channel 25) formerly licensed to Riverside and Perris, California, United States
