= Bradford Field =

Bradford Field may refer to:

- Bradford Field (New Jersey), a private airport in Flemington, New Jersey, United States (FAA: NJ49)
- Bradford Field (North Carolina), a private airport in Huntersville, North Carolina, United States (FAA: NC05)

== See also ==
- Bradford Airport (disambiguation)
