= N81 =

N81 may refer to:

- N81 (Long Island bus)
- Hammonton Municipal Airport, in Atlantic County, New Jersey, United States
- N81 highway (Philippines)
- N81 road (Ireland)
- Nokia N81, a mobile phone
