= Sussex Airport (New Jersey) =

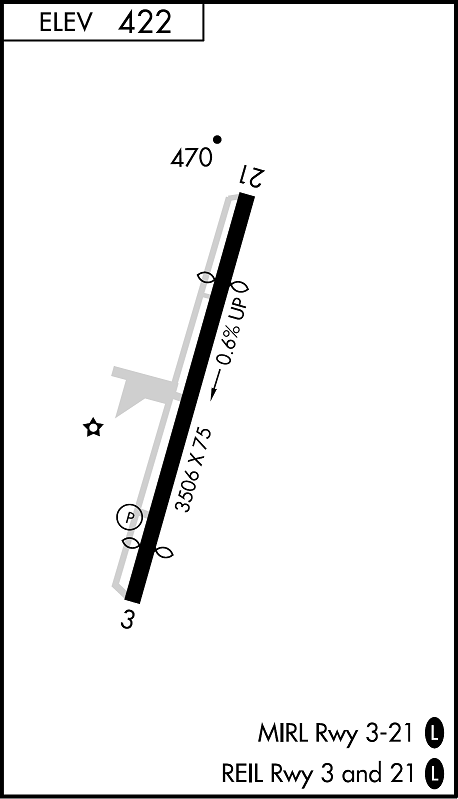
- IATA: none; ICAO: KFWN; FAA LID: FWN

Summary
- Airport type: Public Use
- Owner: Sussex Aviation LLC
- Serves: Sussex, New Jersey
- Location: Wantage Township, Sussex County, New Jersey
- Elevation AMSL: 422 ft / 129 m
- Coordinates: 41°12′01″N 074°37′23″W
- Website: www.sussexaviation.com

Map
- Interactive map of Sussex Airport

Runways
Direction	Length		Surface
Direction	ft	m	Surface
3/21	3,506	1,069	Asphalt

Statistics (2019)
- Aircraft operations: 21,444
- Based aircraft: 29
- Source: Federal Aviation Administration

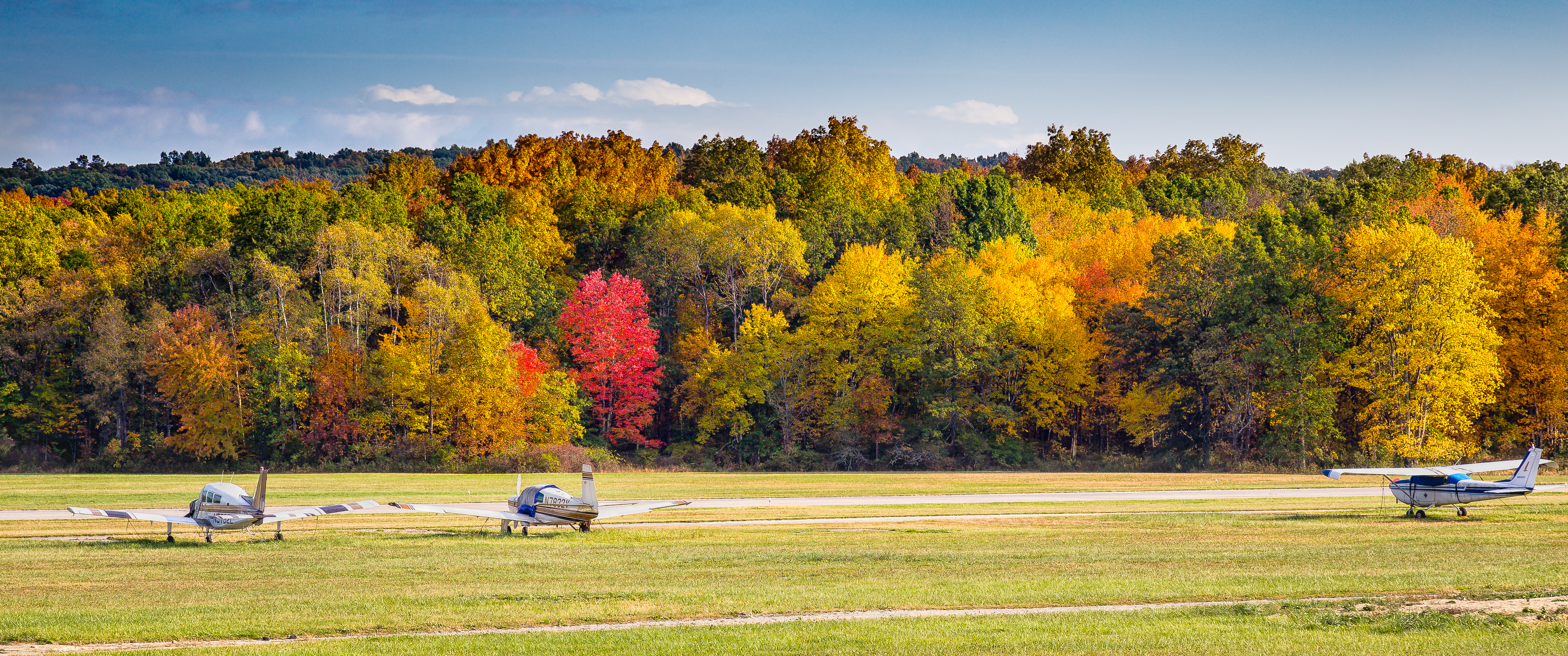
View across airport

Sussex Airport (ICAO: KFWN, FAA LID: FWN) is a privately owned, public use airport located one mile southwest of Sussex in Wantage Township, Sussex County, New Jersey. It is just outside Sussex Borough. The public-use airport is privately owned by Sussex Aviation LLC which purchased it in 2015.

The airport used to host the Sussex Airshow but the previous owner had stopped holding the shows (as of 2009) while he tried to sell the airport. The township of Wantage was then studying the feasibility of purchasing the airport.

Most U.S. airports use the same three-letter location identifier for the FAA and IATA, but this airport is FWN to the FAA and has no IATA code.

== Ownership ==
The airport is privately owned by Sussex Aviation LLC, which purchased the field in 2015 and operates it as Sussex Airport. The company is managed by Alan Antaki, a private airport owner and operator who also owns Monmouth Executive Airport in Wall Township, New Jersey. Antaki has been active in preserving and seeking funding for both facilities, and his ownership of Monmouth Executive has included a prominent dispute with Monmouth County over potential acquisition efforts.

== Facilities ==
Sussex Airport covers 96 acres (39 ha) at an elevation of 421 feet (128 m). Its one runway, 3/21, is 3,506 by 75 feet (1,066 x 23 m). In the year ending May 1, 2019 the airport had 21,444 general aviation aircraft operations, average 59 per day. 29 aircraft were then based at the airport: 86% single-engine, and 14% multi-engine.

The airport does not have air traffic control (ATC), instead using UNICOM where pilots talk on common radio frequencies to coordinate runway and taxiway use.

=== Runway information ===
- Rwy 3 threshold displaced 466 feet (142 m)
- Rwy 21 threshold displaced 756 feet (230 m)
- RNAV (GPS) Rwy 3 approach published
- VOR-A approach published

=== On field ===
- Fuel: 100LL, Jet-A
- Major frame service
- Major powerplant service
- Skydiving school
- Parking
- Tie-downs
- Hangars
- Airport diner

=== Off field ===
- Several small diner restaurants in the borough and surrounding Wantage Township, one directly adjacent to the airfield
- Sussex Inn, 9 Main St, Sussex, NJ – 1 mi
- Shopping and other activities (including Mountain Creek Ski Resort/Waterpark) within 10 miles (16 km) of airport

== Controversies ==
=== Embezzlement by former owner (2009) ===
In 2009, the airport's former owner, Paul Styger, pleaded guilty to federal charges of embezzlement. This stemmed from his misuse of $378,000 of grant money provided for airport improvements. He faced up to two years in prison. He was eventually convicted, and was ordered to repay the money and was put on probation without getting any prison sentence. Wantage Township officials admittedly knew that Styger was under investigation for embezzlement, but were asked to keep silent by state and federal agencies in an attempt to preserve the integrity of the investigation.

=== Hangar and land-use dispute (2024–present) ===
Beginning in 2024 and continuing through 2025, the airport's current owner, Sussex Aviation LLC (Alan Antaki), has been involved in a dispute with the owner/operator of a parcel adjacent to the airfield, William Gennaro (doing business as When Pigs Fly LLC), over the use of multiple private hangars located off-airport on an 18-acre parcel adjacent to the Airport. Antaki and his attorneys allege that the hangars are being used primarily for non-aeronautical storage (for example, cars and other vehicles) in contravention of the property's permitted use and of agreements associated with the parcel; they argue that such non-aeronautical uses jeopardize the airport's ability to obtain certain federal grant funds and otherwise threaten the airport's aeronautical operations. Gennaro and his counsel counter that federal guidance allows temporary non-aeronautical use of vacant hangars and that the land-use board should grant a zoning variance to allow continued rentals to non-aviation tenants when hangars are otherwise unoccupied.

The dispute has produced municipal enforcement actions, land-use hearings before the Wantage Township Land Use Board, municipal court and appellate litigation concerning ordinance violations related to hangar storage, and civil filings in which Sussex Aviation LLC has intervened to protect the airport's interests. Public meeting minutes, local reporting, and court dockets show the matter remains active before the Wantage Land Use Board and in related court filings as of mid-2025.

== See also ==
- List of airports in New Jersey
