= Lincoln Park Airport =

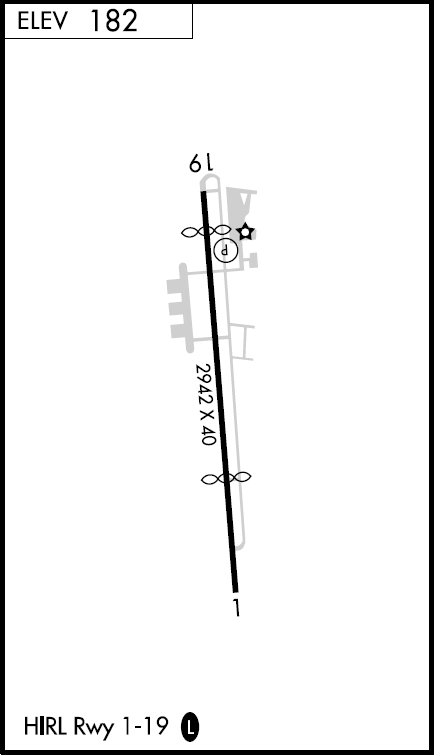
- IATA: none; ICAO: none; FAA LID: N07

Summary
- Airport type: Public use
- Owner: George C. Peck, Sr.
- Serves: Lincoln Park, New Jersey
- Location: Morris County, New Jersey
- Elevation AMSL: 182 ft / 55 m
- Coordinates: 40°56′51″N 074°18′52″W
- Website: LincolnParkN07.com

Map
- Interactive map of Lincoln Park Airport

Runways
Direction	Length		Surface
Direction	ft	m	Surface
1/19	2,942	897	Asphalt

Statistics (2010)
- Aircraft operations: 28,642
- Based aircraft: 110
- Source: Federal Aviation Administration

Lincoln Park Airport (FAA LID: N07) is a privately owned, public use airport located two nautical miles (4 km) north of the central business district of Lincoln Park, in Morris County, New Jersey, United States. It is included in the National Plan of Integrated Airport Systems for 2019–2023, which categorized it as a general aviation reliever airport.

== Facilities and aircraft ==
Lincoln Park Airport covers an area of 168 acres (68 ha) at an elevation of 182 feet (55 m) above mean sea level. It has one runway designated 1/19 with an asphalt surface measuring 2,942 by 40 feet (897 x 12 m).

For the 12-month period ending March 31, 2018, the airport had 30,150 general aviation aircraft operations, an average of 83 per day. At that time there were 94 aircraft based at this airport: 88% single-engine, 6% helicopter, and 5% multi-engine.

== Airport services ==
- Aero Safety Training, an airplane (fixed wing) flight school located at the airport

== See also ==
- List of airports in New Jersey
