= Lakewood Airport =

- IATA: none; ICAO: none; FAA LID: N12

Summary
- Airport type: Public
- Owner: Lakewood Township
- Operator: Steve Reinman
- Serves: Lakewood, New Jersey
- Location: Ocean County, New Jersey
- Elevation AMSL: 42 ft (13 m)
- Coordinates: 40°04′00″N 074°10′40″W
- Website: www.lakewoodnj.gov/travel#airport

Map
- Interactive map of Lakewood Airport

Runways
Direction	Length		Surface
Direction	ft	m	Surface
6/24	2,987	910	Asphalt

Statistics (2023)
- Aircraft operations (year ending 5/31/2023): 26,475
- Based aircraft: 39
- Source: Federal Aviation Administration

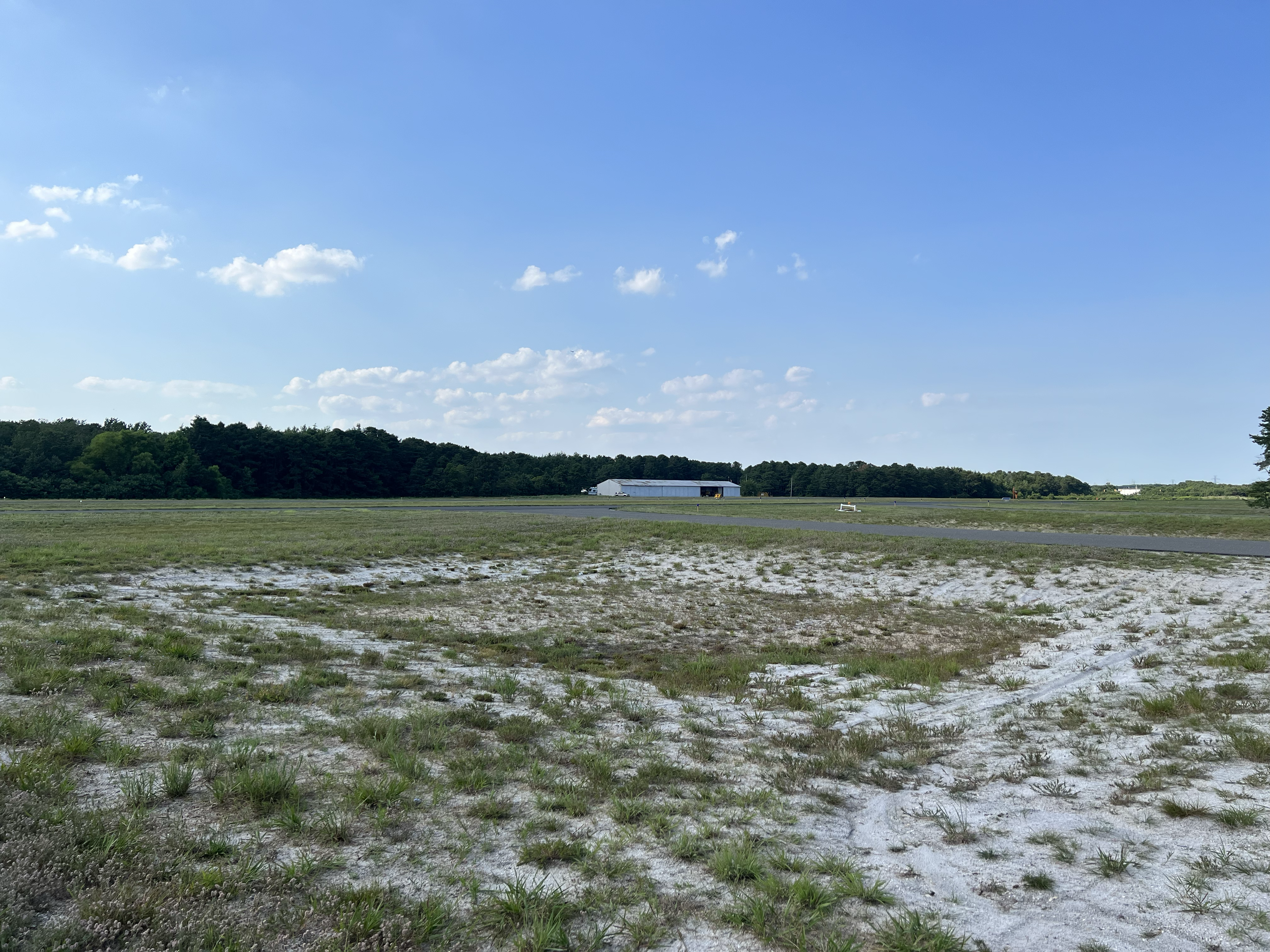
The airport as seen from the collection of T-Hangars.

Lakewood Airport (FAA LID: N12) is a public use airport located 3 nautical miles (5.6 km) southeast of the central business district of Lakewood, in Ocean County, New Jersey, United States. The airport is owned by Lakewood Township. It is included in the National Plan of Integrated Airport Systems for 2011–2015, which categorized it as a general aviation facility.

The airport is home to the Pineland Composite Squadron of the Civil Air Patrol, unit number NER-NJ-096.

== Facilities and aircraft ==
Lakewood Airport covers an area of 192 acres (78 ha) at an elevation of 42 feet (13 m) above mean sea level. It has one runway designated 6/24 with an asphalt surface measuring 2,987 by 60 feet (910 x 18 m).

For the 12-month period ending May 31, 2023, the airport had 26,475 general aviation aircraft operations, an average of 72 per day. At that time there were 39 aircraft based at this airport: 36 single-engine, 1 multi-engine, 1 helicopter, and 1 ultralight.

== Incidents and accidents ==
On November 17, 1967, a Piper PA-28-140 aircraft, registered as N4492J and operated by Ocean City Aviation, crashed during a training flight near the airport. The aircraft was destroyed, resulting in the fatalities of both occupants: a 26-year-old commercial pilot with 3,050 total flight hours and a student pilot. The accident occurred during a go-around maneuver on approach, with the probable cause attributed to the student pilot's failure to maintain flying speed and the pilot-in-command's inadequate supervision. The National Transportation Safety Board (NTSB) investigated the incident, concluding that the aircraft stalled and crashed, with a post-impact fire ensuing. The investigation was completed within six months.

On March 20, 1999, an unregistered, homebuilt M-Squared Sprint 1000 aircraft experienced a fatal accident near the airport. The aircraft, powered by a Rotax 582 engine, was destroyed during a forced landing following an engine failure. The pilot, a 75-year-old male with extensive flight experience, was fatally injured, while the passenger sustained serious injuries. The accident occurred during a local flight that originated from the Jackson Ultralight Center in Jackson, New Jersey. Witnesses reported that the aircraft began a right turn after takeoff, but the engine failed shortly thereafter. The aircraft then entered a left turn, which evolved into a cartwheel before impacting the ground. The engine failure was attributed to the seizure of the magneto piston within the cylinder sleeve due to an over-temperature event. The engine's exhaust gas temperature had reached 1,168 degrees Fahrenheit, exceeding the normal operating range of 930 to 1,150 degrees Fahrenheit. The National Transportation Safety Board (NTSB) determined the probable cause of the accident to be the pilot's loss of control following the engine failure, resulting in an unintentional stall/spin.

On July 3, 2000, a Champion 7GCAA aircraft registered as N8384V operated by O'Brien Aviation crashed at the airport, resulting in the fatal injury of the 44-year-old commercial pilot. The pilot was undergoing supervised training for banner-tow operations at the time of the accident. The single-seat aircraft was not equipped for dual instruction, so the pilot received guidance via radio from a ground-based operator. After successfully picking up a banner, the pilot reported a full right rudder deflection and was instructed to land. Witnesses observed the aircraft making a left turn toward the airport, consistent with a landing pattern, before it stalled to the left and impacted the ground. Post-accident examination revealed that the banner-tow rope had become entangled around the rudder horn, restricting rudder movement. Although the banner release hook was in the "release" position, the banner remained attached. The aircraft was not equipped with a stall warning system. The National Transportation Safety Board (NTSB) determined the probable cause of the accident to be the pilot's failure to maintain airspeed, resulting in an inadvertent stall. Contributing factors included the entanglement of the tow rope with the rudder horn, restricted rudder movement, the pilot's limited experience in banner-tow operations, and the absence of a stall warning system on the aircraft. The pilot had approximately 515 total flight hours, with only about 10 hours in banner-tow operations.

On December 19, 2024, a Cessna 172M Skyhawk, registered as N12194, experienced a landing accident at the airport. The aircraft sustained substantial damage after impacting the airport terrain and a treeline during the landing sequence. The flight had departed from and was returning to Lakewood Airport. Of the three occupants on board, one sustained minor injuries, while the other two were unharmed. The National Transportation Safety Board (NTSB) initiated a Class 4 investigation into the incident. Weather conditions at the time were reported as visual meteorological conditions (VMC) with clear skies and light winds. The final report from the investigation is expected to provide further details on the cause of the accident.

== See also ==
- List of airports in New Jersey
