= Bradford Airport =

Bradford Airport may refer to:

- Bradford Aerodrome, serving Bradford, Ontario, Canada (IATA: YFD)
- Bradford County Airport, serving Towanda and Bradford County, Pennsylvania, United States (FAA: N27)
- Bradford Regional Airport, serving Bradford and McKean County, Pennsylvania, United States (IATA: BFD)
- Leeds Bradford Airport, serving Leeds and Bradford in West Yorkshire, England (IATA: LBA)

== See also ==
- Bradford Field (disambiguation)
