= Monmouth Executive Airport =

Airport in Wall Township, New Jersey, United States

- IATA: BLM; ICAO: KBLM; FAA LID: BLM

Summary
- Airport type: Public use
- Owner: Wall Aviation (Wall Herald Corporation)
- Serves: Belmar / Farmingdale, New Jersey
- Location: Wall Township, New Jersey
- Opened: June 1946; 80 years ago
- Elevation AMSL: 153 ft (47 m)
- Coordinates: 40°11′12″N 074°07′28″W
- Website: monmouthjetcenter.com

Map
- Interactive map of Monmouth Executive Airport

Runways
Direction	Length		Surface
Direction	ft	m	Surface
14/32	7,345	2,239	Asphalt
3/21	3,508	1,069	Asphalt

Statistics (2022)
- Aircraft operations (year ending 7/31/2022): 63,750
- Sources: Federal Aviation Administration

Monmouth Executive Airport (IATA: BLM, ICAO: KBLM, FAA LID: BLM) is a privately owned, public-use airport in Wall Township, Monmouth County, New Jersey, United States. It lies beside Route 34 about five miles west of Belmar, the city with which the Federal Aviation Administration (FAA) associates it, and just east of Farmingdale, next to the Wall Stadium racetrack. It has two asphalt runways, the longer of which measures 7,345 feet (2,239 m), and the FAA's National Plan of Integrated Airport Systems lists it as a privately owned reliever airport.

The airport was built by Edward I. Brown Jr., a local pilot who began clearing a former gravel pit for a landing field in about 1940 and, after wartime service as a Navy pilot, opened it in June 1946 as Monmouth County Airport. Brown renamed it Allaire Airport in 1983 and Monmouth Executive Airport in 2001. In its early decades it had a fly-in drive-in theater, promoted as the first in the world (1948), scheduled airline flights by All American Airways and its successor Allegheny Airlines (1951–1956), an Army Signal Corps flight-test detachment from Fort Monmouth (1952–1963), and a commuter carrier, Monmouth Airlines, which Brown incorporated in 1968.

Monmouth County tried several times to acquire the airport, by purchase or condemnation, in the 1960s, 1970s, 1980s and 2000s; a purchase contract signed in 1983 fell through, and later negotiations ended in 2005. Brown owned the airport until his death in 2006, and in December 2013 his family sold it to Wall Aviation, a group led by Alan Antaki. A further county effort, begun in 2023, to study taking the airport ended in March 2025 with an agreement that left it in private ownership. Antaki also owns Sussex Airport in Wantage Township, New Jersey.

In a 2011 analysis by the Regional Plan Association, Monmouth Executive scored highly as a potential airport for airline flights to expand capacity and relieve aviation congestion in the New York area.

== History ==
=== Origins and opening (1938–1946) ===
The airport was the creation of Edward I. Brown Jr. (1917–2006), who was born in Ocean Grove, grew up at the Jersey Shore, and bought his first airplane, a seaplane he used for sightseeing flights at Seaside Heights, in 1937. Looking for an airport site in Wall Township, he was referred to Phoebe Brisbane, the widow of the newspaper editor Arthur Brisbane, whose family owned a former sand and gravel pit along Route 34. By Brown's later account, Brisbane rented him the tract, for $100 a year, until he could afford to buy it; he dated the purchase of the first 450 acres to 1938, the year from which the airport has since counted its history.

In February 1939 the Asbury Park Press reported that Brown was "interested in establishing an airport on Route 34 west of Belmar", and in the spring of 1940 he applied to the state aviation department to license a field for light aircraft there, to be called Belmar Airport. He began work in the summer of 1940, clearing the scrub pine with a World War I tank from the American Legion post in Belmar that he had repaired and converted into a bulldozer, and flew his own airplane in and out of the strip he made. The work stopped when Brown became an Army ferry pilot in February 1942 and then a Navy pilot.

After his discharge in 1945 Brown, by then the owner of the tract, resumed construction with his wife Christene on what the Press described as a 500-acre property bounded by Route 34 and Hurley Pond Road. The plans called for two runways of at least 3,000 feet and a combined house, office and hangar, and Brown named his privately owned field Monmouth County Airport. The Civil Aeronautics Administration approved the airport in December 1945, and it was formally opened with an air fair on June 16, 1946, that drew more than 10,000 people. In an advertisement in Flying magazine in July 1947 the airport listed three runways, two of them paved and 3,700 feet long, equipment for night flying, a hangar for 20 visiting airplanes, a Link Trainer and a flight school approved by the Civil Aeronautics Administration.

=== Fly-in theater and other ventures ===
Brown later said that his flight school "started to die out" in 1947 and that he had to find other income to pay for the airport. On June 3, 1948, he opened beside the field what the Press called the first fly-in, drive-in theater in the world. It held more than 500 cars and 20 airplanes; pilots who landed at the airport taxied to a ramp behind the cars, where a jeep towed each airplane to a stand with its own speaker. The theater was designed by the architect Claude Birdsall and built in about three and a half months, at a cost of nearly $125,000 for buildings and equipment, on 16 acres; the trade annual Theatre Catalog reported in 1950 that an average of eight to ten airplanes a week had used it since the opening. According to Mechanix Illustrated, Brown had the idea after seeing a pilot circle an outdoor film showing at a Florida naval base during his Navy service. In 1956 the advertising magazine Tide reported that as many as 15 airplanes were coming to a showing. Brown went on to build drive-ins at Toms River and Manahawkin and eventually sold all three to the Walter Reade chain; he bought the Wall theater back in the mid-1960s, though not, he said, to run it as a theater.

Rents from non-aviation tenants became a mainstay of the business. By 1962 the airport tract held a bowling alley, the drive-in, four electronics companies, a plastics company and a United Parcel Service garage, and it was the largest taxpayer in Wall Township; by 1968 Brown counted 33 buildings in an industrial park whose rents, he said, carried the airport through slow periods. He also ran an amusement park, Ed Brown's Playground, on the property, and owned a local weekly newspaper, the Wall Herald.

=== Airline service and the Army (1951–1963) ===
The airport on U.S. Geological Survey maps of 1954, with the drive-in theater and a radio range station marked. Wall Stadium is at the bottom.

In July 1949 All American Airways applied to the Civil Aeronautics Board for authority to fly between Atlantic City and Newark by way of the airport. Scheduled airline service began on June 1, 1951, when the airline made the airport a stop on a route linking Washington, Atlantic City and Newark. More than 1,000 people attended the "Air Service Day" ceremony, at which U.S. Senator Robert C. Hendrickson cut a ribbon, and the flights gave the northern Shore its first regular airmail service. A year later the airline was operating four Douglas DC-3 departures a day, two to Washington and two to New York's Idlewild Airport, from a 3,800-foot main runway, and had carried more than 1,500 passengers.

Traffic never approached the airline's forecasts. In May 1956 the carrier, by then renamed Allegheny Airlines, told the Civil Aeronautics Board that an average of 95 passengers a month were boarding at the airport against a projected 500, and that the new Garden State Parkway and New Jersey Turnpike had put Newark Airport 45 minutes away by road. It was allowed to suspend the service that year and never resumed it, and the board made the discontinuance permanent in March 1961.

From 1952 the Army Signal Corps at Fort Monmouth based its aviation section at the airport, leasing hangars and a firehouse and staffing the control tower, to flight-test airborne communications and ground-controlled approach equipment; an Air Force weather detachment supported it. The unit, the Signal Corps Army Aviation Center, had first been housed at Red Bank Airport; when it marked its first anniversary on July 1, 1953, it occupied the main hangar and several other buildings at Monmouth County Airport, had grown from 13 to 186 military and civilian personnel, and operated Cessna L-19 and de Havilland L-20 liaison airplanes and Hiller and Bell helicopters. A Signal Corps officer wrote in Flying in 1954 that the center had used the airport as its base until July of that year, when it was integrated into the Army Electronic Proving Ground at Fort Huachuca, Arizona; Fort Monmouth's aviation section remained at the airport. In February 1961 the Federal Aviation Agency designated a control zone around the airport to protect the instrument and radar approaches used there by military and civil aircraft. Brown and the Army disagreed over the rent and the upkeep of the field, and in December 1963 the section, with 52 aircraft and about 140 military and civilian personnel, moved to the Lakehurst Naval Air Station. Communications and weather reporting at the airport ended on November 29, 1963, and the Federal Aviation Agency revoked the control zone in January 1964. In April 1967 the agency approved a civilian operation of the tower: Brown said that two certified controllers would staff it, at first on weekends, from April 29. By 1973, he said, the tower had not been used for several years because it was too expensive to staff, and the airport has remained without an operating tower.

A "First Annual National Aviation Trade Show", endorsed by the National Aviation Trades Association, was advertised for June 1–9, 1957, at the airport. By 1958 the airport had a radio beacon transmitting on 281 kilocycles with the identifier BLM, which Yachting magazine noted was also of use to boaters off the coast. In June 1963 the paved main runway was 4,000 feet long and 100 feet wide, and a gravel cross runway had recently been relocated and shortened from 2,800 to 2,200 feet. On June 3, 1964, a windstorm tore the roof from a hangar at the airport and damaged 12 airplanes.

=== County purchase attempts and Monmouth Airlines (1962–1981) ===
Monmouth Airlines timetable of October 1968, showing one of its Beechcraft 99s

The prospect of losing the Army led the Monmouth County Board of Chosen Freeholders to consider buying the airport in 1962 and 1963. In May 1966 the board announced that it intended to acquire the 700-acre property for between $1 million and $2 million and would condemn it if Brown refused to sell. Brown promised a "bitter battle" in the courts, and the county did not proceed; in July 1967 the freeholders asked him instead to consider selling about 400 acres of the property, and they returned to the idea in 1973, and a county-commissioned study in 1977 favored the Wall airport among the possible sites for a county airport. The Tri-State Regional Planning Commission, in its annual report for 1977–78, recommended that the airport receive airline service by 1995 unless Newark Airport was still underused at that time.

Brown had run charter flights from the start and in 1956 began an air taxi service to Newark and Idlewild. The service was using the name Monmouth Airlines by early 1967, when it announced 20 scheduled flights a week to Washington National Airport from March 6, flown with twin-engined airplanes and a four-engined de Havilland Heron. In May 1968 Brown organized it as a corporation, Monmouth Airlines, Inc., which acquired three 15-seat Beechcraft 99 turboprops and by that August was flying 14 scheduled flights a day to Washington and Boston. Its timetable of October 14, 1968, lists flights from the airport to Washington National and to Hanscom Field near Boston, and flights between Boston and Philadelphia. The main runway, 4,200 feet long in 1968, was lengthened to 5,000 feet in 1973; by 1979 an instrument landing system had recently been installed, and a group of private investors agreed to put money into the airline. The airline was renamed Ocean Airways in May 1979 and flew from the airport to Washington, with some flights stopping at Atlantic City; it was $942,000 in debt by early 1980, went bankrupt in 1981 and ceased operating. On October 24, 1971, a Monmouth Airlines Beechcraft 99 flying from New York to Allentown by way of Scranton had struck Blue Mountain in Moore Township, Pennsylvania, killing both pilots and two of the passengers. The National Transportation Safety Board attributed the accident to the pilot's failure to follow the approved procedures for an instrument approach.

=== Allaire Airport (1983–2001) ===
The airport, then named Allaire Airport, on U.S. Geological Survey maps of 1989. Route 34 is the red road at right.

In May 1983 Brown renamed the field Allaire Airport, and that September he and Freeholder Director Harry Larrison Jr. signed an $8.3 million contract for the county to buy more than 267 acres, including the main airport buildings, with a federal grant expected to cover 90 percent of the price. Brown was to stay on as manager. The contract was challenged in court by a Democratic freeholder, and at the end of 1983 a Superior Court judge ruled that the board could not give Brown the three-year management position that the contract provided for. Control of the board then passed to the Democrats. In June 1984, after a consultant's study, the board voted 3–1 to affirm its plans to acquire the airport, and a county advisory committee recommended that as much as 1,580 acres around it be studied as an "airport development district"; Brown, who said he had been willing to sell only if he could stay on as manager, said he would fight the acquisition. On September 25, 1984, an $800,000 bond ordinance for the county's share of the price fell one vote short of the four it needed. In April 1985 the board suspended negotiations after the site of a former tenant of the airport's industrial park, Monitor Devices, was proposed for the federal Superfund list, and that August, with Brown saying that the airport was not for sale, a majority of the freeholders said they would not condemn it. The Federal Aviation Administration, which had kept its $7.5 million grant available since 1983, questioned the county's lack of progress, and the grant was later withdrawn. A newspaper feature of November 1983 described the field as the largest privately owned, public-use airport in New Jersey, covering 654 acres, with a 7,000-foot main runway exceeded in length only by runways at the Newark and Atlantic City airports; Brown said in 1985 that about 217 small aircraft and 15 helicopters were based there.

The following years were marked by disputes between Brown and Wall Township over zoning. The township's zoning board rejected a hotel and convention center that he proposed in 1984, and the two sides went to court after he began holding events, including a boat show, in a hangar he called the Allaire Exposition Center. In October 1988 Brown announced in his newspaper that he would close the airport at the end of the month "until such time as the political climate becomes much improved", and gave aircraft owners notice to leave; he withdrew the threat after several weeks. By then he owned about 800 acres. The New York Times reported in January 1988 that about 225 airplanes and 15 helicopters were based at the airport, which by Brown's count handled 100,000 to 150,000 landings a year, and that Governor Thomas Kean had asked the United States Customs Service to designate it, with Morristown Airport, a port of entry for international flights. Brown had by then used the front page of his weekly newspaper, The Herald, to criticize the township planning board's handling of his applications; the township administrator called the coverage "grossly unfair" and "self-serving". By April 1988 the developer K. Hovnanian had bought 38 acres beside the airport from Brown for a planned $50 million business park. A United States Geological Survey map published in 1989 shows the airport under the Allaire name with its present pair of crossing runways. A study of general aviation published by the New Jersey Department of Transportation in 1996 described Allaire, a designated reliever airport, as the state's largest privately owned, privately funded public-use airport, at 850 acres. It counted more than 173,000 aircraft operations a year and nearly 275 based aircraft, gave the lengths of the runways as 7,000 and 3,500 feet, and estimated that in 1994 the airport's aviation tenants and visitors had supported 469 jobs and about $29.8 million in economic activity in the state. On July 1, 1999, Brown opened a third runway, a 1,500-foot strip for the 27 banner-towing airplanes then based at the field.

=== Wall Township purchase attempt (1998–2000) ===
The airport in a U.S. Geological Survey color-infrared aerial photograph of 1995

In August 1998 the Wall Township Committee, concerned about what would become of the airport after Brown, obtained from him a nine-month exclusive option to buy it at a minimum price of $36 million. Township officials said that owning the airport would let the township control how it developed, and a state grant of $152,000 paid for a feasibility study. About 300 people attended a public meeting on the purchase in May 1999, at which a state aeronautics official said the state supported it.

The option expired that May. On August 17, 1999, township officials and Representative Chris Smith announced that the New Jersey Department of Transportation would contribute $12 million and the Federal Aviation Administration up to $24 million toward the price. Days later Brown said that "negotiations for the sale are over", noting that the grants would be paid over four years. Talks continued, and in February 2000 he turned down a revised offer that would have let him lease the airport back for up to ten years, saying: "My airport is not for sale."

=== Proposed sale to the county (2001–2005) ===
In 2001 Brown, then 84, renamed the field Monmouth Executive Airport and offered Monmouth County an exclusive option to buy the 673-acre property for at least $36 million. Federal Aviation Administration records still listed it as Allaire Airport in late 2002. The FAA changed the name from Allaire Airport to Monmouth Executive Airport in its description of the surrounding controlled airspace in a rule published in September 2011. Wall Township at first opposed a county purchase, fearing that the county would expand the field into a commercial airport, but the two governments then worked toward an agreement, and in a non-binding referendum that November 4,975 township voters supported the county's negotiations and 2,270 opposed them. The agreement between the two governments, set out in a letter from the freeholder director in September 2001, committed the county not to establish commercial cargo or scheduled passenger service, to make payments to the township in lieu of property taxes, and to give the township a part in drawing up a master plan for the airport. That October the township and Brown settled a lawsuit in which the township had accused him of putting up a building without its approval; Brown maintained that state and federal aviation authorities had approved it. On October 25, 2001, after a training airplane was damaged in a landing, Brown closed the airport for about 21 hours in a dispute with township police, who would not let him move the airplane from the runway until federal authorities had inspected the scene; he put up a sign at the entrance reading "Wall police seize airport – closed".

The talks continued for four years, held up by the price, which stood at $41 million by 2003, and by environmental studies of the site. The state's annual appropriations acts of 2000, 2001 and 2002 each listed $3 million for "Allaire airport" among the projects to be paid for from the Transportation Trust Fund. A state transportation commission reported in 2003 that discussions were under way that could lead to an outright purchase of the airport with a combination of federal, state and local funds, and in the summer of 2004 the state aeronautics division's newsletter said that negotiations for a public purchase were in progress. In September 2005 Brown said the negotiations were finished; he was concerned that a purchase made with federal money would allow the FAA to require all-night operation and larger aircraft, which he opposed. He died on June 14, 2006, aged 89.

=== Sale of the airport (2006–2013) ===
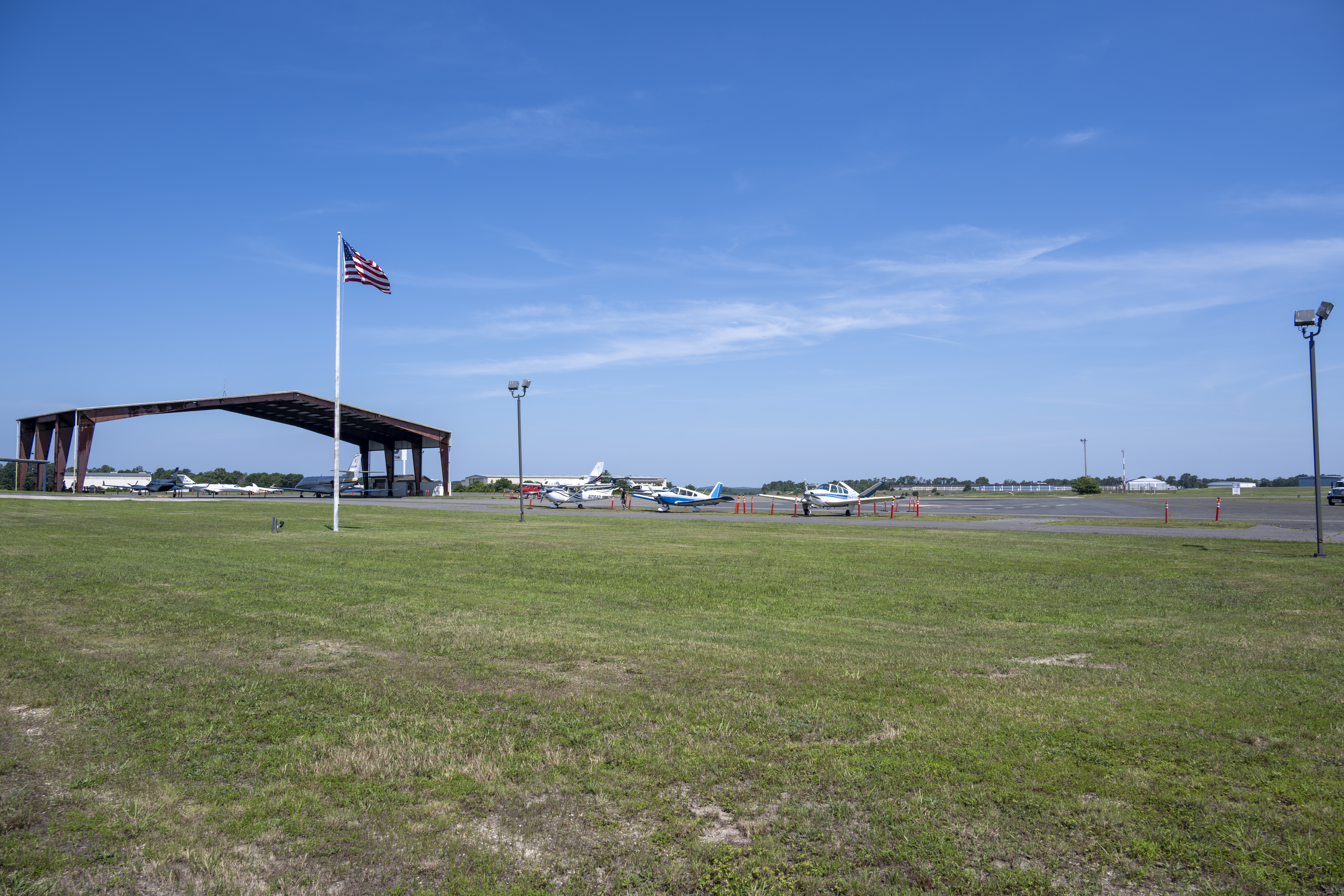
Ramp and shade hangar at the airport

After Brown's death his stepson, Jack Taylor, ran the airport for the family. In 2008 U.S. Helicopter Corporation, which flew scheduled helicopter services from Manhattan, stated in its filings with the Securities and Exchange Commission that it provided a limited seasonal service between Manhattan and the airport. In 2011 Taylor said that the airport employed almost 500 people and paid Wall Township $1.3 million a year in property taxes. In August 2007 the county was told that the trust that owned the airport had sold it to Onyx Equities, a real-estate investment company based in Woodbridge; a year later the buyer was still in its due-diligence period, and the sale was not completed. County officials, who had been negotiating to buy the airport themselves, said they were surprised by the sale; according to the county, Onyx had undertaken to keep the property an airport restricted to small aircraft and to clean up the pollution on the site. In October 2009 a second prospective buyer, Hotel Acquisition Corp., announced that it intended to acquire the airport, and the property was still under contract to it in April 2010. In 2010 Wall Herald Corporation agreed to pay about $20 million toward the cleanup of the Monitor Devices Superfund site, in the airport's industrial park, where a tenant had manufactured circuit boards from 1977 to 1980 and contaminated the groundwater with solvents; the Environmental Protection Agency had proposed the site for its National Priorities List in April 1985 and placed it on the list on June 1, 1986. The Brown family's lawyer said that about $20 million of the proceeds of the airport's sale would go to the cleanup, and the Environmental Protection Agency was to begin cleaning up the groundwater with $3 million in federal stimulus funds. The agency had announced in August 2009 that up to $5 million in Recovery Act money would go toward the groundwater cleanup. The treatment system has operated since 2010, and in September 2023 the agency amended its cleanup plan to deal with 1,4-dioxane that had been found in the groundwater after the work began.

In December 2013 the family sold the airport to Wall Aviation, an investment group led by Alan Antaki that had sought to buy it for more than a decade. The price was not disclosed; the sale was structured as a purchase of stock, so that the airport remained the property of Wall Herald Corporation, and the buyers took on the remaining cleanup costs. In 2024 NJ.com described Antaki as the president and majority stockholder of Wall Herald Corporation. The new owners said they intended to turn what their consultant called a "hobby airport" into a facility for corporate aircraft. They brought in a new fuel supplier and gave notice to the skydiving and banner-towing businesses that had long been based there, citing the hazard of mixing slow aircraft and parachutists with jets. The fixed-base operator reopened under a new name, Monmouth Jet Center, on November 22, 2013. By the summer of 2014 the two main aerial-advertising companies and the skydiving operators had left. The banner operators said that flying from airfields farther away would raise their costs, and attributed the change to the owners' wish to attract a wealthier clientele; the airport's manager said that banner and skydiving flights had brought in a negligible share of its revenue, and a regional tourism official called the banner planes part of what the Jersey Shore represents.

=== Taxes and Wall Township (2013–2024) ===
When the sale was announced in November 2013, Wall Herald Corporation owed Wall Township about $2.3 million in property taxes and penalties, and the property had been scheduled for a tax sale that month. The buyers agreed with the township to pay off the arrears in installments. In 2015 the township committee approved an amended installment agreement, under which the company was to pay up to $100,000 a month toward about $2 million still owed, along with an agreement on the development of non-aeronautical land at the airport.

In 2016 Wall Herald appealed to the New Jersey Tax Court against a $45 million assessment of the airport, the township's largest property taxpayer. The company said in its filings that the township's revaluation consultant had at first valued the property at about $30.4 million; the township administrator said the assessment had not been changed arbitrarily. A settlement in December 2017 reduced the assessment to $34 million, and in March 2018 the township committee hired an aviation consultant to advise it in its discussions with the airport. In February 2024 the company's attorney said that it had paid more than $2.8 million in overdue taxes, interest and penalties and had been current on its property taxes since 2021, which the township administrator confirmed.

=== Cleanup cost settlements (2010–2025) ===
Under the 2010 consent decree, Wall Herald Corporation agreed to pay the United States $19.76 million out of the proceeds of a sale of its stock or property. According to a notice filed by the Department of Justice in federal court in April 2024, the United States approved the 2013 stock sale although it did not produce enough to pay the amount due, on the understanding that the company would pay the Environmental Protection Agency in full within a year. The filing states that the company did not make its lump-sum payment of $20.8 million by the January 15, 2015 deadline, which was then extended several times; that it paid a $2.5 million installment by October 8, 2021, and made its required monthly payments; and that it did not make the final principal payment due on December 31, 2023. In a sixth modification filed on April 29, 2024, the United States extended the deadline for the outstanding principal, then about $16.5 million, to December 31, 2025, with interest payable until then. The Coast Star reported in October 2024 that the company had paid off the debt, which was more than $16 million; an EPA spokesperson confirmed that it had been paid in full, and a spokesperson for the company said Antaki had used a loan to pay it.

In April 2016 Wall Herald sued the New Jersey Department of Environmental Protection and the administrator of the state's Spill Compensation Fund, seeking a declaration that liens the state had filed against the airport property under the state's Spill Compensation and Control Act, for its costs of cleaning up the site, were invalid. Under a consent judgment entered in October 2018, the company agreed to pay the state $1,381,085 for past and future cleanup costs and natural resource damages, including $1,175,000 due within three years. Consent amendments entered in July 2022, July 2023 and July 2024 extended the deadline for that payment, less monthly installments paid in the meantime, to June 1, 2025.

=== County acquisition study (2023–2025) ===
The airport in 2023 (National Agriculture Imagery Program). Wall Stadium is at lower right.

In November 2023 the Monmouth County Board of County Commissioners adopted a resolution to "explore possible alternatives to preserve the airport", citing the state's eminent domain statute, and its attorneys notified Antaki that the county intended to inspect and appraise the property. A state law enacted in 2022 had allowed counties to operate airports as public utilities and to issue bonds to acquire them. Antaki opposed any takeover and accused the county of wanting to profit from a film studio that Netflix plans to build at the former Fort Monmouth; Commissioner Director Thomas A. Arnone said the county's concern was the safety and financial condition of the airport.

The county hired the consulting firm Merchant Aviation, under a $180,000 contract, to assess whether the airport could be better run and maintained under public ownership. Its inspection, on November 22, 2024, was limited to two hours, between 1 and 3 a.m., which county officials said left most of the runways, taxiways and buildings unexamined; Antaki's attorney replied that airport safety is regulated by the New Jersey Department of Transportation and the FAA rather than the county, and that the state had just renewed the airport's license. In September 2024 Wall Herald Corporation sued the county, its sheriff and its park rangers in federal court, alleging that employees handing out leaflets against the takeover at the Monmouth County Fair that July had been moved away from the fairgrounds and told to give leaflets only to people who asked for them. The parties stipulated to the suit's dismissal, and the court entered an order of dismissal on September 29, 2025.

On March 13, 2025, after a meeting between Arnone and Antaki, the commissioners passed a resolution ending the effort. It recorded that Antaki had obtained a $1 million state grant for runway repairs, had agreed to give the county a right of first refusal if he sold the airport, and would explore training partnerships with Brookdale Community College and vocational schools. The Asbury Park Press reported that the county had by then spent nearly $300,000 on legal and marketing fees in the effort and was committed to nearly $200,000 more, not counting the consultant's fee.

== Facilities and operations ==
Older hangars and apron on the east side of the airport, October 2025

The airport is at an elevation of 153 feet (47 m) and has two asphalt runways: 14/32, which is 7,345 by 100 feet (2,239 by 30 m), and 3/21, which is 3,508 by 50 feet (1,069 by 15 m) and is closed to aircraft weighing more than 12,500 pounds. The FAA publishes RNAV (GPS) instrument approaches to both ends of runway 14/32 and a VOR approach to the airport. There is no control tower; the field has an automated weather station, and 100LL and Jet A fuel are sold. Published figures for the size of the property have varied, from 638 acres to about 850 acres; the Asbury Park Press gave 740 acres in 2026. The New Jersey Department of Transportation's airport directory for 2022 gives 850 acres.

In October 2021 the Wall Township planning board unanimously approved Wall Herald's application to rebuild runway 14/32 at a width of 100 feet, down from 125 feet, and to relocate its taxiway; a hearing in July had been carried over. The state's Airport Improvement Program has helped pay for pavement work: the New Jersey Department of Transportation's list of grants for fiscal year 2017 includes about $1.45 million for emergency runway and taxiway pavement repairs at the airport, and its list for fiscal year 2025, released in February 2025, includes $900,000 in state funds toward a $1,000,000 partial runway mill-and-fill and marking replacement project. The department's list for fiscal year 2026, released in April 2026, includes $822,689.55 in state funds toward a $914,099.50 partial runway mill-and-fill and marking replacement project (phase 2) at the airport.

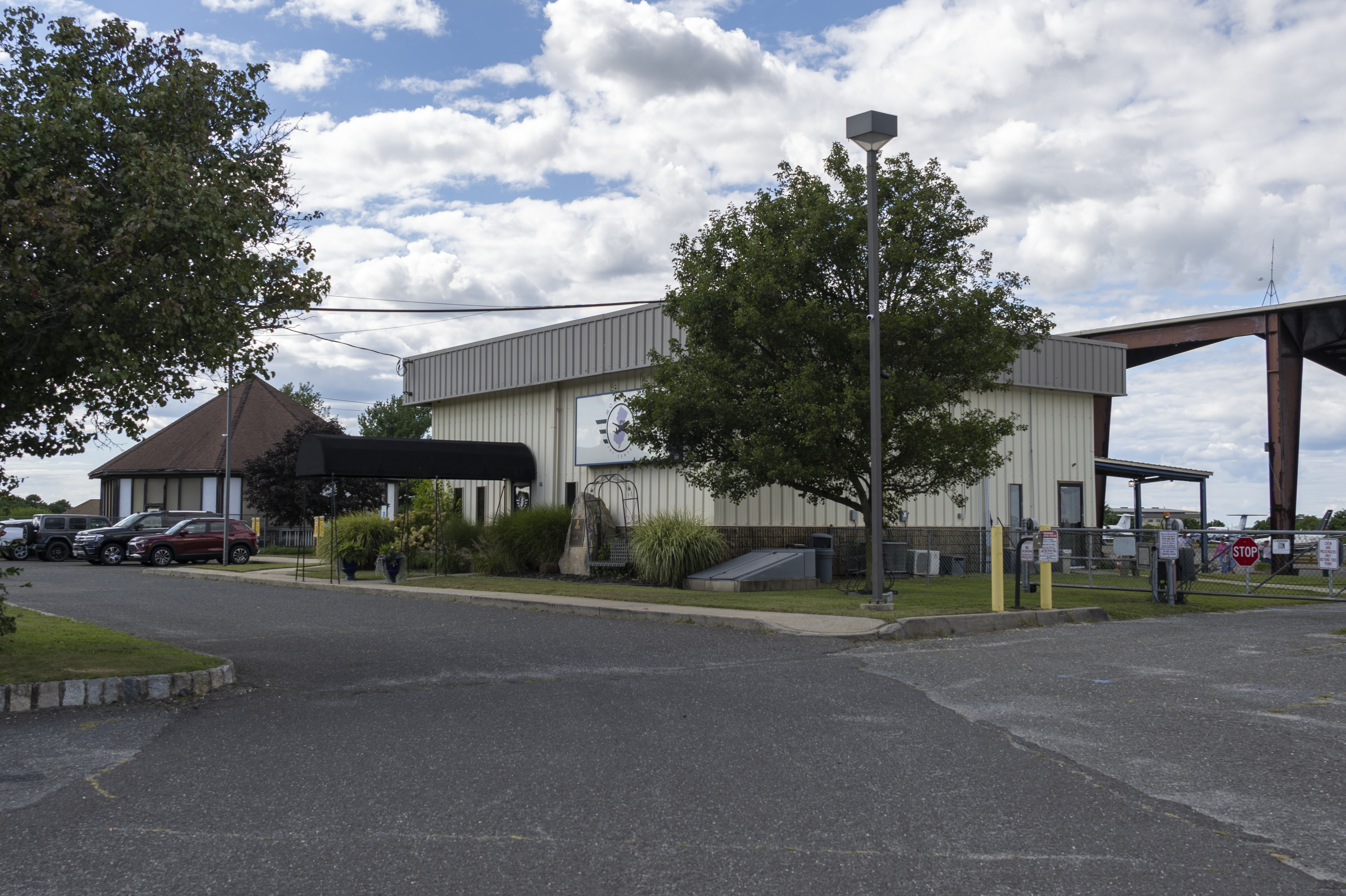
The fixed-base operator, Monmouth Jet Center, in August 2025

The fixed-base operator is Monmouth Jet Center. Two flight schools, Monmouth Flight Academy and Elite Flight Experience, are based at the airport.

A study of the economic impact of the state's airports published by the New Jersey Department of Transportation in 2016 attributed 193 jobs, a payroll of about $12.6 million and about $40.2 million in annual economic output to the airport. In the year ending July 31, 2022, the airport had 63,750 aircraft operations, an average of 175 per day, of which 85 percent were general aviation and 15 percent air taxi. The FAA's National Plan of Integrated Airport Systems for 2025–2029 classes it as a privately owned reliever airport with no assigned role ("unclassified"), records 32 based aircraft, and estimates no development costs for it over the period. According to an FAA spokesperson quoted in 2025, the airport has never received FAA grant funding. In 2009 the Asbury Park Press reported that $1.08 million in federal airport funds had been allocated in the airport's name since 1982, at least half of which paid for an environmental audit the county commissioned in 2003 while it was considering buying the property; an airport official said the owners had "never used public funds". The FAA's list of grants approved in fiscal year 2003 includes one of $540,000, with Monmouth County as sponsor, to conduct an environmental study at the airport. In April 2020 the airport was among New Jersey airports allocated federal CARES Act relief funds, in its case $1,000.

Both runways were scheduled to close to fixed-wing aircraft from September 14 to October 15, 2026, for the resurfacing of runway 14/32, with hangar access and helicopter traffic still permitted. The project was to cost $2.7 million, most of it covered by state Department of Transportation grants. The main runway closed on September 14, the day of a groundbreaking ceremony for the project.

== Air shows and other events ==
A second annual air fair at the airport was scheduled for June 15, 1947. Flying magazine's calendar for June 1960 listed the Greater Asbury Park Jaycees' second annual air fair at the airport for June 11, with the Navy's Blue Angels as the featured act. In August 2010 the "Wings of Freedom" tour of World War II-era aircraft, including a B-24 bomber, was scheduled to be on display at the airport from August 25 to 29.

== Accidents and incidents ==
- On June 4, 1980, a man stole a Piper Aztec from the airport at about 5 a.m. and, about 40 minutes later, crashed it into a house in Neptune Township, which burned. He was killed; no one else was injured. In 1983 the New Jersey Supreme Court held the flight school that owned the airplane liable for the damage on the ground, under a state law that makes aircraft owners absolutely liable for such damage, although the airplane had been taken without its permission.
- On June 11, 1985, a Cessna 152 (N4956B) flown by an instructor and a student pilot who had not yet soloed collided with a hovering Sikorsky S-76A helicopter (N176FJ) as the Cessna lifted off from a touch-and-go landing on runway 3. The helicopter had approached from the south and was hovering near the parallel taxiway; its pilot had neither seen the Cessna nor heard it on the radio. The Cessna crashed in an open field, killing the instructor and seriously injuring the student. The damaged helicopter landed, and the four people aboard had minor injuries.
- On October 12, 1988, an amateur-built Rand Robinson KR-2 (N3774G) crashed and burned on its first flight from the airport, killing its 72-year-old pilot. Investigators found no mechanical failure and noted that he had little or no experience in the type.
- On July 18, 1996, a Champion 7GCBC Citabria (N7557F) operated by United Aerial Advertising stalled and crashed while its pilot was attempting to pick up a banner, killing him. The National Transportation Safety Board (NTSB) cited the pilot's handling of the maneuver and his limited experience in banner towing.
- On July 1, 2002, a Piper PA-18 (N2414P) on a banner-towing flight drifted off the right side of runway 32 during takeoff, banked steeply and struck the ground, and then burned. The pilot was killed. The NTSB attributed the accident to his failure to maintain directional control and found no mechanical fault.
- On May 5, 2003, a Beech A36 Bonanza (N111TW) flying from Sarasota, Florida, to Bridgeport, Connecticut, ran out of fuel while diverting to the airport and struck trees about 1.8 miles to the northwest. The 75-year-old pilot was killed and his son was seriously injured. The NTSB cited the pilot's delayed decision to refuel.
- On March 28, 2007, a Piper PA-28-151 (N33521) on a local flight crashed in woods in Howell Township, about four miles southwest of the airport, after its 70-year-old pilot became disoriented and asked air traffic control for help. He was killed. The NTSB found that he had serious medical conditions he had not reported to the FAA and concluded that he was probably impaired by a stroke or transient ischemic attack.
- On July 5, 2008, an amateur-built Van's RV-7 (N916R) that had taken off from the airport dived almost vertically into the Shark River Inlet, about four miles to the east, killing its owner and pilot. The NTSB could not determine why control was lost. The same airplane had been damaged at the airport on October 31, 2006, when a disconnected throttle linkage caused a loss of power on its first test flight.

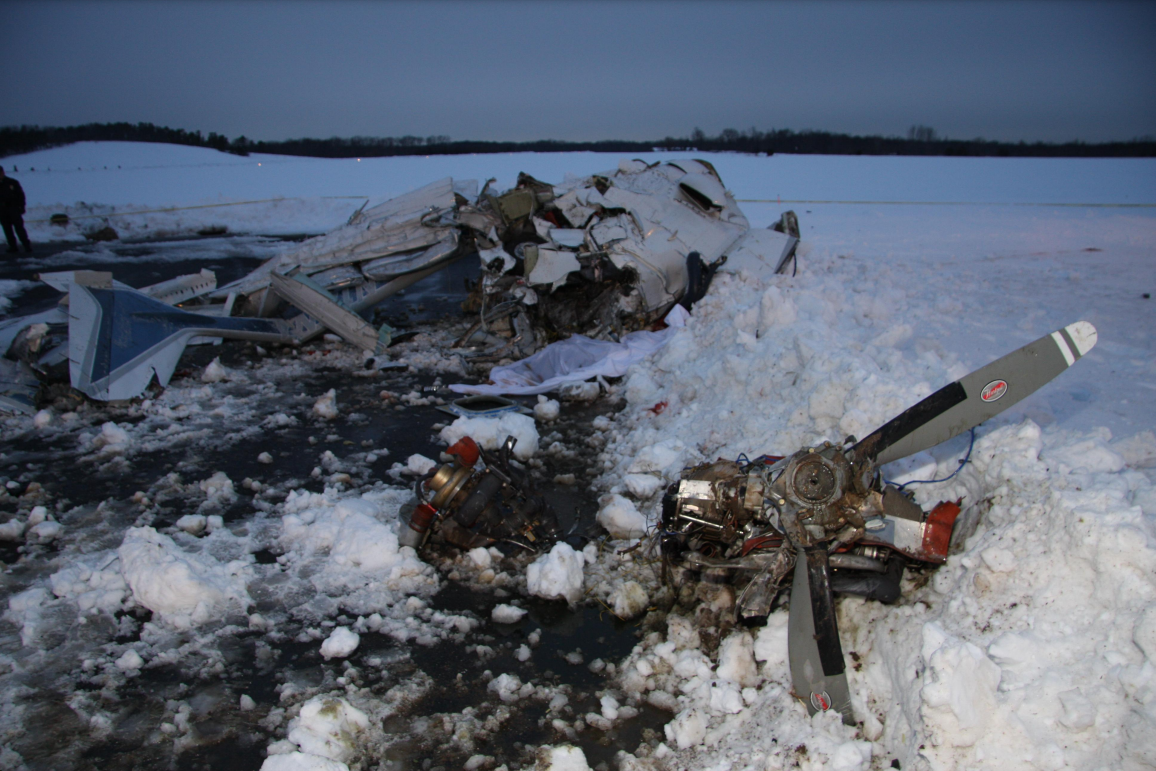
Wreckage of N12NA at the airport after the February 2010 accident

- On February 15, 2010, a Cessna T337G (N12NA) broke up during a low, high-speed pass over runway 32 when the outer section of its right wing failed as the airplane pitched up. All five people aboard, two of them children, were killed. The NTSB found that the pilots had exceeded the airplane's operating limitations; it also noted that the airplane had been modified under 22 supplemental type certificates whose combined effect had not been evaluated.
- On September 23, 2013, F-16 fighters intercepted a single-engine Diamond DA40 that had entered airspace restricted for the United Nations General Assembly and escorted it to a landing at the airport, where law enforcement officers met it; officials said there appeared to be no connection with terrorism.
- Late on February 25, 2020, a Learjet 55 arriving from Richmond, Virginia, ran off the runway while landing and came to rest on the edge of a hillside. The two crew members and three passengers were not injured.
- On September 2, 2023, a Cirrus SR20 (N420PB) that a student pilot had flown solo from the airport at night crashed in woods and burned shortly after a takeoff from Ocean County Airport in Toms River, killing the pilot.
- On July 13, 2026, a Smith Aerostar 601P that had flown from the airport earlier that evening crashed shortly after taking off from Adirondack Regional Airport in Saranac Lake, New York, for the return flight, killing the pilot and his two passengers. The NTSB's preliminary report found that the airplane had climbed no higher than 125 feet above the ground.

== See also ==
- List of airports in New Jersey
- Aviation in the New York metropolitan area
- Colts Neck Airport, a former general aviation airport elsewhere in Monmouth County
