= Colts Neck Airport =

Defunct airport in Monmouth County, New Jersey

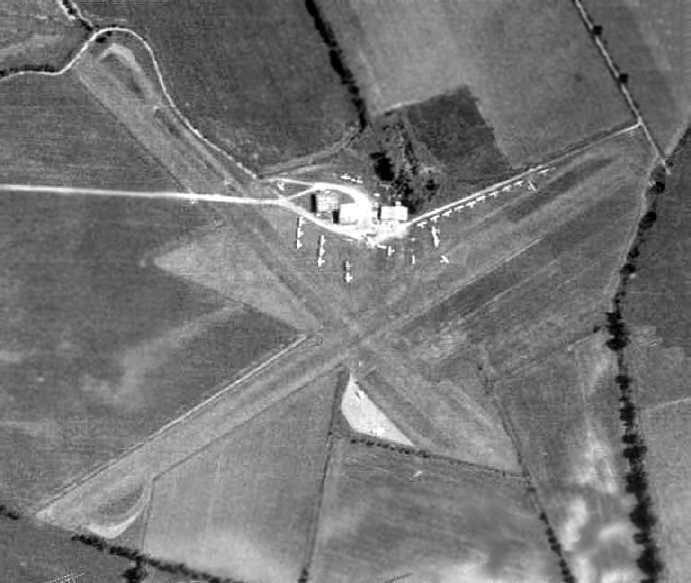
- Aerial view of the airport, c. 1970
- IATA: none; ICAO: none; FAA LID: N61

Summary
- Airport type: Private (defunct)
- Owner: George J. DeGarmo (1930s–1940s); Armand Hammer (c. 1952–1982); Harry and Steven Markos (1982–c. 1984); Sidney Weiner and Martin Granoff (c. 1984–1988)
- Operator: C-Wings, Inc. (1940s); Shore Air Services (1962–1967); Paul Wille / Wilco Aviation (1968–1988)
- Location: Colts Neck Township, New Jersey, U.S.
- Opened: 1938
- Closed: November 1988
- Built: 1937–1938
- Elevation AMSL: 100 ft (30 m)
- Coordinates: 40°16′40.8″N 74°10′55.2″W

Map
- Location within Monmouth County, New Jersey Location within New Jersey

Runways
Direction	Length		Surface
Direction	m	ft	Surface
6/24		2,490	Turf
14/32		2,060	Turf
- Runway data: 1979 New Jersey Airport Directory, as cited by Freeman

Colts Neck Airport (FAA LID: N61) was a small privately owned general-aviation airport in Colts Neck Township, Monmouth County, New Jersey, United States. The turf airfield lay just south of the village of Colts Neck, south of County Route 537 and west of Route 34. It began in the late 1930s as the private landing field of the aviator George J. DeGarmo, and by 1947 it was in commercial use.

Over some four decades a succession of fixed-base operators offered flight instruction, aircraft rental, sales and charter at the field, which was also used for crop dusting, banner towing, glider flying, Civil Air Patrol activity and hot air ballooning. Plans announced in 1962 to pave and lengthen the main runway were not carried out, and county officials who considered the field as a possible county-owned airport in 1966 and 1977 favored Monmouth County Airport in Wall Township instead.

The land was owned for about 30 years by the industrialist Armand Hammer, who sold it in 1982. Later owners planned houses and a golf course for the tract, and the airport closed at the beginning of November 1988, after they settled a zoning lawsuit with the township. The tract was eventually developed with houses and the golf course that is now Trump National Golf Club Colts Neck.

== History ==
=== Origins and early years ===
The airport began as the private landing field of George J. DeGarmo, an aviator who was president of Standard Aerial Survey, an aerial-survey company based in Newark. In December 1936 DeGarmo, then living in Hackensack, bought the 191-acre Higgins farm, on the south side of the county road in the village of Colts Neck, for use as a summer home. In October 1937 the Red Bank Register reported that he was "having an airplane landing field made" on the estate, and the Asbury Park Press has given 1938 as the year in which the airport was built. By July 1939 DeGarmo had put up a large hangar, in which he kept his company's four aircraft, beside a landing field 1,200 feet long. A 1945 newspaper profile of the township said that, before entering military service, he had flown daily in his own plane between Newark Airport and "the private air field on the property".

A 1972 newspaper report described the airstrip as "built in the 1930's" on the former DeGarmo farm, and in 1962 the Register described DeGarmo, a former Navy flyer who by then headed a precast-concrete company, as the airport's designer and former owner. According to a 1973 New York Times feature, the Navy used the airport's hangar during World War II to serve the nearby Earle ammunition depot. No airport at Colts Neck appears on the sectional charts of November 1942 or 1945; the earliest chart that depicts it is the January 1948 New York sectional, which shows a 2,400-foot unpaved runway. A 1947 aerial photograph shows two grass runways and three hangars. An airport directory published in Skyways magazine in November 1947 listed Colts Neck Airport as an all-turf field with a wind cone, hangars, minor repairs, and 80- and 90-octane fuel.

By June 1947 the field was operated by C-Wings, Inc., a company headed by William Cubbage of Middletown that sold, serviced and repaired Stinson aircraft and was then building a crop duster. The Register described the airport in 1948 as privately owned by DeGarmo and lying on his estate on the Colts Neck–Freehold road, an eighth of a mile west of Route 34.

The Lincroft–Holmdel Kiwanis club held benefit air shows at the airport on June 6, 1948, and June 12, 1949. At the first, more than thirty aircraft were exhibited, a Navy blimp from Lakehurst made two wheel landings, an Army radar truck was opened to the public and a local pilot demonstrated crop dusting. The Kiwanis Magazine put the attendance at about 3,500. The second included a dive-bombing exhibition by Navy Corsair fighters and displays by a blimp and two helicopters, and drew between three and four hundred spectators.

In 1960 the aviation division of Fort Monmouth, which had been using the airport as a base for Army helicopters, stopped doing so after dairy farmers complained to the township committee that the low-flying helicopters were upsetting their cows and affecting milk production.

=== Shore Air Services (1962–1967) ===
In October 1962 Shore Air Services, Inc., headed by Gordon D. "Duff" Donald Jr., a former Air Force instructor pilot, took over the airport, renting it from Armand Hammer, the former owner of Shadow Isle Farms. Until then, the Register reported, pilots had normally stopped at the field only on weekends. Donald opened it seven days a week and announced plans to pave the 2,500-foot main runway and extend it by 950 feet, install lighting for night flying, and build T-hangars and a pilots' ready room, with a motel, restaurant and swimming pool to follow on sublet land. The mayor, Joseph L. Moreau Jr., said he was "shocked" to learn of the project from the newspaper, and stated that the airport was a non-conforming use under the township's zoning ordinances and could not be expanded. The runways remained unpaved.

Donald's partner in the operation, William Grossman, and Grossman's wife were killed on March 17, 1963, when their Piper Apache crashed into Long Island Sound shortly after taking off from Bridgeport, Connecticut, for Colts Neck. Shore Air began selling Beechcraft aircraft in late 1962, and by August 1963 it had added a conference room, a maintenance shop and a snack bar, along with landing lights that a pilot could switch on by radio from the air. The field was the base of the Holmdel Flying Club, a 75-member club sponsored by the Bell Telephone Company, and of the Red Bank Composite Squadron of the Civil Air Patrol. By 1967 Sky Advertising Corporation, a firm headed by Cecil Coffrin that made up its advertising banners in Brooklyn, was flying its seven banner-towing aircraft from the airport. Aerial photographs show 12 aircraft parked at the field in 1963, compared with one in 1957.

In May 1966 Shore Air's shop refurbished a non-flying Aeronca 65-TL in Air Force colors; it was trucked to the Kennedy Compound in Hyannis Port, Massachusetts, on May 27, a gift from Joseph P. Kennedy Sr. to his 24 grandchildren that was set up in the yard of Jacqueline Kennedy's house, where John F. Kennedy Jr. and his cousins could play in it. Kurt Wagner, the mechanic who ran Shore Air's aircraft shop at the airport and who painted the aircraft, recalled in 1999 that Jacqueline Kennedy had sent him a note of thanks. The same month, Monmouth County officials planning a county-owned airport said they would study buying Colts Neck Airport because of its proximity to Fort Monmouth, although the purchase of Monmouth County Airport in Wall Township remained the likeliest proposal.

The airport closed on October 31, 1967. Donald said that the landowner would not extend Shore Air's lease for more than six months, and that the company could not continue to operate on that basis.

=== Wilco Aviation (1968–1980s) ===
The airport on the U.S. Geological Survey topographic map as photorevised in 1981, between Route 537 (top), Route 34 (right) and the Route 18 freeway

The airport reopened under Paul Wille, who took it over in 1968 and managed it into the 1980s. His company, Wilco Aviation Corporation, operated the field, where he ran a flight school and rented light aircraft. Wille leased the land from a holding company headed by Hammer. He said in 1972 that he had discontinued commercial flights because "they would not be compatible with the community", and that the airport was used principally for instruction in light single-engine aircraft. A 1970 aerial photograph shows 26 aircraft parked at the field.

A 1973 New York Times feature called the unpaved field "one of the oldest and most rustic airports in the metropolitan area". It reported that the airport was the home base of about a dozen vintage aircraft dating from 1933 to 1946, eight of them owned by Coffrin's firm and used for skywriting and banner towing, and of the largest group of Piper J-3 Cubs in the state. Coffrin, then 73, had skywritten the alphabet for filming by the children's television program Sesame Street. In April 1973 Gustave Scheurer, the founder of the Aero Club Albatross, a New Jersey gliding club established in 1929, flew from the airport an open-frame primary glider of about 1928 that he had rebuilt over two years, before presenting it to the National Soaring Museum in Elmira, New York.

In August 1971 the acting director of the state Division of Aeronautics said that the airport had been sold, would be developed, and would close within 18 months, but it stayed open. A neighbor publicly criticized the airport as a safety hazard and a source of noise, and after residents questioned its safety the state aeronautics division informed the township in February 1973 that the airport was being operated in compliance with state and federal regulations.

In January 1973 an Asbury Park bank began sending checks by helicopter from the airport to the Wall Street heliport to speed their clearance. That May, Exxon, which owned the airport's two underground fuel tanks, let its aviation-fuel contract with the field lapse before agreeing to continue supplying it; Wille said the airport used about 45,000 gallons a year.

A 1977 consultants' study of sites for a county-owned airport kept Colts Neck Airport among three locations still under consideration but judged its development as a county facility costly, despite open, flat terrain with room for expansion; Monmouth Airport in Wall Township remained the leading choice. The 1979 New Jersey Airport Directory listed Wille as manager and Sky Advertising and Wilco Aviation as fixed-base operators. In October 1979 a light aircraft that had towed a banner reading "Long Live the Shah" past the New York hospital where Mohammad Reza Pahlavi, the deposed Shah of Iran, was being treated was followed by a New York City police helicopter to Colts Neck Airport, where its pilot was given four summonses.

Recollections quoted in the Abandoned & Little-Known Airfields survey describe flight instruction, banner towing and glider towing at the field, and pilot Rich Peabody recalled that when he moved to the area in 1984 it had about 30 based light aircraft and about 10 sailplanes. National Transportation Safety Board (NTSB) accident records from the 1980s likewise involve gliders, a glider tug and banner-towing aircraft flying from the airport. By 1985 Wille, still the airport's manager, and his wife were also giving rides and lessons in hot-air balloons, which The Register described rising above the airport.

=== Sale, closure and redevelopment ===
The former airport site (center) in 2023, with Route 537 across the top, Route 34 at right and Route 18 at lower right

Hammer moved to California in 1955 but kept Shadow Isle Farm and the airport, which he held through a company, Monmouth Developers Inc. In March 1978 he proposed a residential golf complex on the tract, with two 18-hole courses and 79 houses, but the plan was not pursued. In October 1982, after owning the land for about 30 years, he sold some 420 acres, including the airport, for $1.2 million to Harry and Steven Markos, New York nurserymen. Their agent said that they would keep the airport in operation while offering it for sale with about 100 adjoining acres.

About 1984 the land was bought by the developers Sidney Weiner and Martin Granoff of Saddle Brook. A plan for 81 houses and six farms on the 416-acre tract, which the township planning board discussed in January 1986, called for the airport to be closed and its hangar and grass runway removed. The developers sued the township over an ordinance that allowed one house for every ten acres in agricultural zones. The three-year lawsuit ended in September 1988 with an agreement under which 57 houses and a golf course would be built and 318 acres set aside as open space; Weiner said that the airport had been notified and would close by October 31.

Banner-towing aircraft were still operating from the airport in May and June 1988, and pilot Adam Rosenberg, who learned to fly there, recalled renting aircraft until August 1988, when it was "finally shutting down". Reporting the impending closure that October, the Asbury Park Press described two dilapidated hangars, bumpy grass runways and fewer than a dozen aircraft left on the field. The Central Jersey Gliding Club, which had kept five sailplanes and a tow plane there, had already moved to another airport, and Wille said that he had not spent much on maintenance in recent years because he had known that the airport would eventually close. The airport closed at the beginning of November 1988. Jack Elliott, aviation columnist of The Star-Ledger, wrote that more than 50 aircraft had at one time been based on the 40-acre field, and that groups of schoolchildren and scouts had visited it over two decades.

On September 27, 1990, a Cessna 150 that had landed at the field low on fuel crashed while taking off again through grass eight to ten inches high; the NTSB's finding of probable cause refers to a takeoff "from a closed airport". The last aeronautical chart on which the Abandoned & Little-Known Airfields survey located the airport is the June 1985 New York sectional, and it no longer appeared on the December 1993 chart. A report by the New Jersey General Aviation Study Commission's Subcommittee on Airport Closings, presented to the commission on June 25, 1996, said that a corporation that had bought the land for development, and then decided not to proceed because of a downturn in the economy, closed the airport on its lawyers' advice because of alleged exposure to liability.

The redevelopment took more than a decade. In 1992 the developers then pursuing the project sought approval for 49 houses on 414 acres at the former airport site, off Hominy Hill Road, and hoped to add a private golf course. A 1995 USGS aerial photograph shows the site not yet redeveloped, and the 1996 subcommittee report said of the land: "That land is still vacant." In October 2000 the developer of Colts Neck Country Club, a 49-house development then under construction off Hominy Hill Road, won preliminary approval for an adjoining 18-hole golf course designed by Jerry Pate, the first seven holes of which were to be integrated into the housing development. The course opened as Shadow Isle Golf Club; Donald Trump bought it out of foreclosure in 2008 and renamed it Trump National Golf Club Colts Neck. The survey describes a 2013 aerial photograph as showing a golf-course community covering the site, and quotes a 2005 correspondent, William Angus, as saying that the airfield was "completely gone".

== Facilities ==
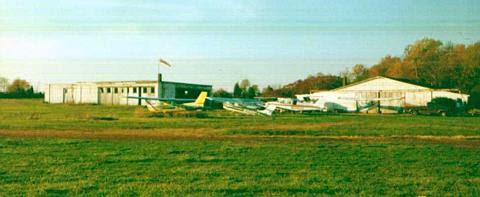
The main hangar and ramp, in an undated photograph by Adam Rosenberg

The airport had two turf runways, which the 1979 New Jersey Airport Directory listed as 6/24 (2,490 ft) and 14/32 (2,060 ft). The 1979 and 1985 aeronautical charts show a 2,500-foot runway, and earlier sources give shorter lengths (for example, 2,400 and 1,350 ft in the 1968 Flight Guide). The U.S. Geological Survey's topographic map of the area, as photorevised in 1981 from aerial photographs taken in 1976, shows the two runways crossing south of a group of buildings. The airfield itself covered about 40 acres of the surrounding tract. One pilot recalled that the only entrance was a dirt road from Route 537 that crossed a runway to reach the hangar and office area, and another recalled a row of T-hangars and a conventional hangar.

Pilot Adam Rosenberg described the field as "two runways and a seriously-beat-up hanger and office". He wrote that the FAA database listed a UNICOM frequency (122.8) that nobody on the field listened to, and that it listed fuel, "but no pilot I know trusted it to have more gasoline than water". NTSB reports of landing accidents in 1983 and 1985 refer respectively to a hump and a rut in the sod runway.

== Accidents and incidents ==
- On July 18, 1964, a pilot for an aerial-advertising company was killed when his aircraft crashed and burned in a field next to the airport. Police said that he had been making a second pass over a banner strung between two poles, to hook it to the aircraft, when the plane nosed over.
- On August 30, 1971, a helicopter leased by the Monmouth County Mosquito Extermination Commission crashed and burned shortly after takeoff from the airport, killing its pilot, Michael V. Sheehan, 23. The airport manager said that the helicopter had just been refueled and that the fuel hose apparently caught on a landing skid as it lifted off. In 1973 a jury awarded the helicopter's owner $22,500 against Wilco Aviation and the airport employee who had refueled the aircraft.
- On November 10, 1972, a Piper Colt flown by a student pilot crashed on a residential street during takeoff from the airport; the pilot received a minor head injury. Wille said that inspectors attributed the crash to engine failure caused by fuel contamination, and that it was the first off-airport crash in more than a decade.
- A Piper Cherokee owned by Wilco Aviation and rented at Colts Neck crashed on a golf course in Wall Township in April 1979, killing the pilot and a passenger; investigators believed that they had been returning to Colts Neck from Robbinsville.
- The Aviation Safety Network lists a Champion 7GCAA Citabria (registration N87108) that was written off in a maneuvering accident on August 15, 1982; the record gives N61 as both departure and destination airport. Its only occupant was not killed.
- On August 17, 1985, a Cessna 305A (N5250G) that had flown from Colts Neck dived into the water while towing a banner at low level along the beach at Brooklyn, New York, killing the pilot. Investigators found a failed aileron cable but could not establish whether it had broken before the impact.

== See also ==
- List of airports in New Jersey
