= Aviation in the Philadelphia metropolitan area =

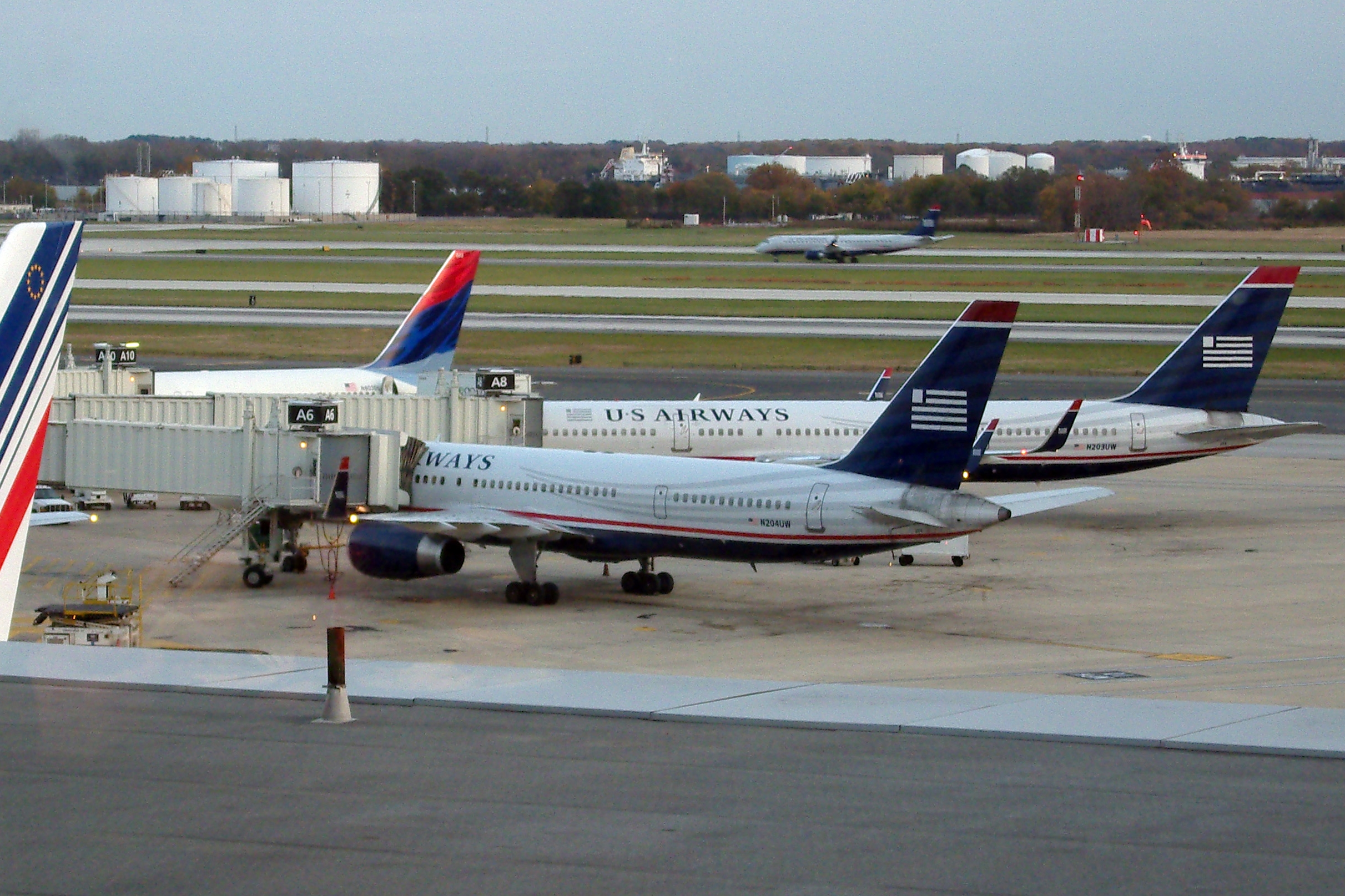
Aircraft at Philadelphia International Airport in Philadelphia, 2008

The Philadelphia metropolitan area has some of the busiest airspace in the Northeastern United States. The area has a population of approximately 6,100,000 with over 40,000,000 passengers passing through the area's airports. The major airports include Philadelphia International Airport, Atlantic City International Airport, and Reading Regional Airport.

== Commercial airports ==
- Philadelphia International Airport
- Atlantic City International Airport
- Reading Regional Airport
- Wilmington Airport

=== Philadelphia International Airport ===
The airport was established in 1925 for use by the Pennsylvania Air National Guard. During World War II the United States Army Air Forces used the airport as a First Air Force training airfield. Philadelphia Municipal became Philadelphia International in 1945, when American Overseas Airlines began flights to Europe. The airport saw massive growth and many airlines over the years. Including multiple hubs. Now a hub for American Airlines, 70% of its traffic is from its hub carrier.

As of 2015, the airport had passenger numbers of 31,444,403 passengers, 411,368 aircraft operations and 403,783.9 tons of cargo.

=== Atlantic City International Airport ===
The airport was built in 1942 as Naval Air Station Atlantic City and has served the Atlantic City area ever since. In August 1943, NAS Atlantic City changed its mission to strictly fighter training, consisting of low and high altitude gunnery tactics, field carrier landing practice (FCLP), carrier qualifications (CQ), bombing, formation tactics, fighter direction, night operations and an associated ground school curriculum. Since 1958, the airport has been home to Atlantic City Air National Guard Base and the 177th Fighter Wing (177 FW), an Air Combat Command (ACC)-gained unit of the New Jersey Air National Guard, operating the F-16C/D Fighting Falcon. ACY is also home to Coast Guard Air Station Atlantic City.

=== Reading Regional Airport ===
Opened as a civil airport in April 1938, Reading Airport was used by the United States Army Air Forces First Air Force as a training airfield during World War II. In the 1950s TWA, Capital and Colonial (then Eastern) stopped at Reading. Allegheny replaced Capital in 1960, TWA left in late 1962, Eastern left in 1969, and Reading dropped out of the OAG in 2004.

== See also ==
- Aviation in Pennsylvania
