= Vineland–Downstown Airport =

- IATA: none; ICAO: none; FAA LID: 28N

Summary
- Airport type: Public
- Owner: Downstown Arpt. Inc.
- Operator: Curtis Nixholm
- Serves: Vineland, New Jersey
- Location: Franklin Township, Gloucester County, New Jersey
- Elevation AMSL: 120 ft / 37 m
- Coordinates: 39°32′22″N 074°58′04″W

Map
- Interactive map of Vineland–Downstown Airport

Runways
Direction	Length		Surface
Direction	ft	m	Surface
2/20	2,251	686	Turf
12/30	1,800	549	Turf

Statistics (2013)
- Aircraft operations: 43
- Based aircraft: 3
- Source: Federal Aviation Administration

Vineland–Downstown Airport (FAA LID: 28N) is a privately owned, public-use airport in Franklin Township, Gloucester County, New Jersey, United States. It is located four nautical miles (4.6 mi, 7.4 km) northeast of the central business district of Vineland, a city in Cumberland County.

== Facilities and aircraft ==
Vineland–Downstown Airport covers an area of 45 acres (18 ha) at an elevation of 120 feet (37 m) above mean sea level. It has two runways with turf surfaces: 2/20 is 2,251 by 100 feet (686 x 30 m) and 12/30 is 1,800 by 100 feet (549 x 30 m).

For the 12-month period ending October 31, 2010, the airport had 1,095 general aviation aircraft operations, an average of 3 per day. At that time there were 21 aircraft based at this airport, all single-engine.
