= Somerset Airport (New Jersey) =

Somerset Airport George Walker Field
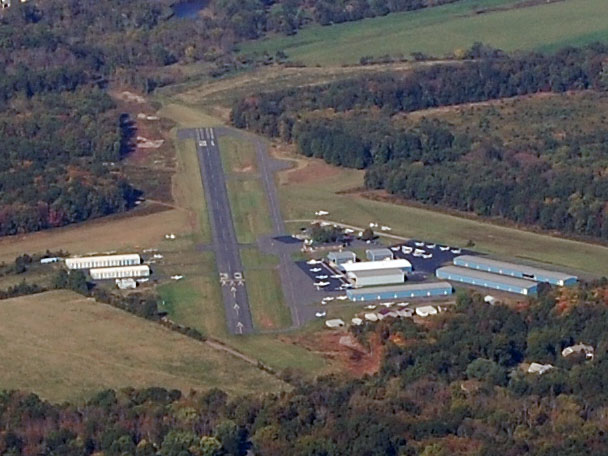
- IATA: none; ICAO: KSMQ; FAA LID: SMQ

Summary
- Airport type: Public
- Owner: Somerset Air Service, Inc.
- Serves: Somerville
- Location: Bedminster, New Jersey
- Elevation AMSL: 106 ft / 32 m
- Coordinates: 40°37′34″N 074°40′12″W
- Website: www.SomersetAirport.com

Map
- Interactive map of Somerset Airport

Runways
Direction	Length		Surface
Direction	ft	m	Surface
12/30	2,739	835	Asphalt
8/26	1,923	586	Turf
17/35	1,700	518	Turf

Statistics (2023)
- Aircraft operations (year ending 4/30/2023): 43,700
- Based aircraft: 92
- Sources: FAA and airport web site

Somerset Airport (ICAO: KSMQ, FAA LID: SMQ) is a public-use airport in Bedminster Township, Somerset County, New Jersey, United States. It is located three miles (5 km) north of the central business district of Somerville and is privately owned by Somerset Air Service, Inc. The airport is also known as George Walker Field.

Although most U.S. airports use the same three-letter location identifier for the FAA and IATA, Somerset Airport is assigned SMQ by the FAA but has no designation from the IATA (which assigned SMQ to Sampit Airport in Indonesia).

== Facilities and aircraft ==
Somerset Airport covers an area of 210 acres (85 ha) which contains three runways:

- Runway 12/30: 2,739 × 65 ft (835 × 20 m), surface: asphalt
- Runway 8/26: 1,923 × 100 ft (586 × 30 m), surface: turf
- Runway 17/35: 1,700 × 150 ft (518 × 46 m), surface: turf

For the 12-month period ending April 30, 2023, the airport had 43,700 aircraft operations, an average of 120 per day, all of which were general aviation. As of April 30, 2023, there were 92 aircraft based at this airport: 83 single-engine, 4 multi-engine, 3 helicopters, and 2 gliders.

== 2017 Presidential temporary flight restrictions ==
Somerset Airport is within a 10-mile radius of the Trump National Golf Club in Bedminster, New Jersey, and thereby subject to FAA flight restrictions whenever President Donald Trump is in Bedminster. Thus, the airport was shut down from August 4–20, 2017 while Trump resided in Bedminster.

== See also ==
- List of airports in New Jersey
