= N61 road (Netherlands) =

Motorway in Zeeland, Netherlands

N61, or rijksweg 61, is a freeway in the province of Zeeland in the Netherlands, running between Terneuzen and Schoondijke.
