= Hammonton Municipal Airport =

Coordinates: 39°40′02.888″N 074°45′27.84″W

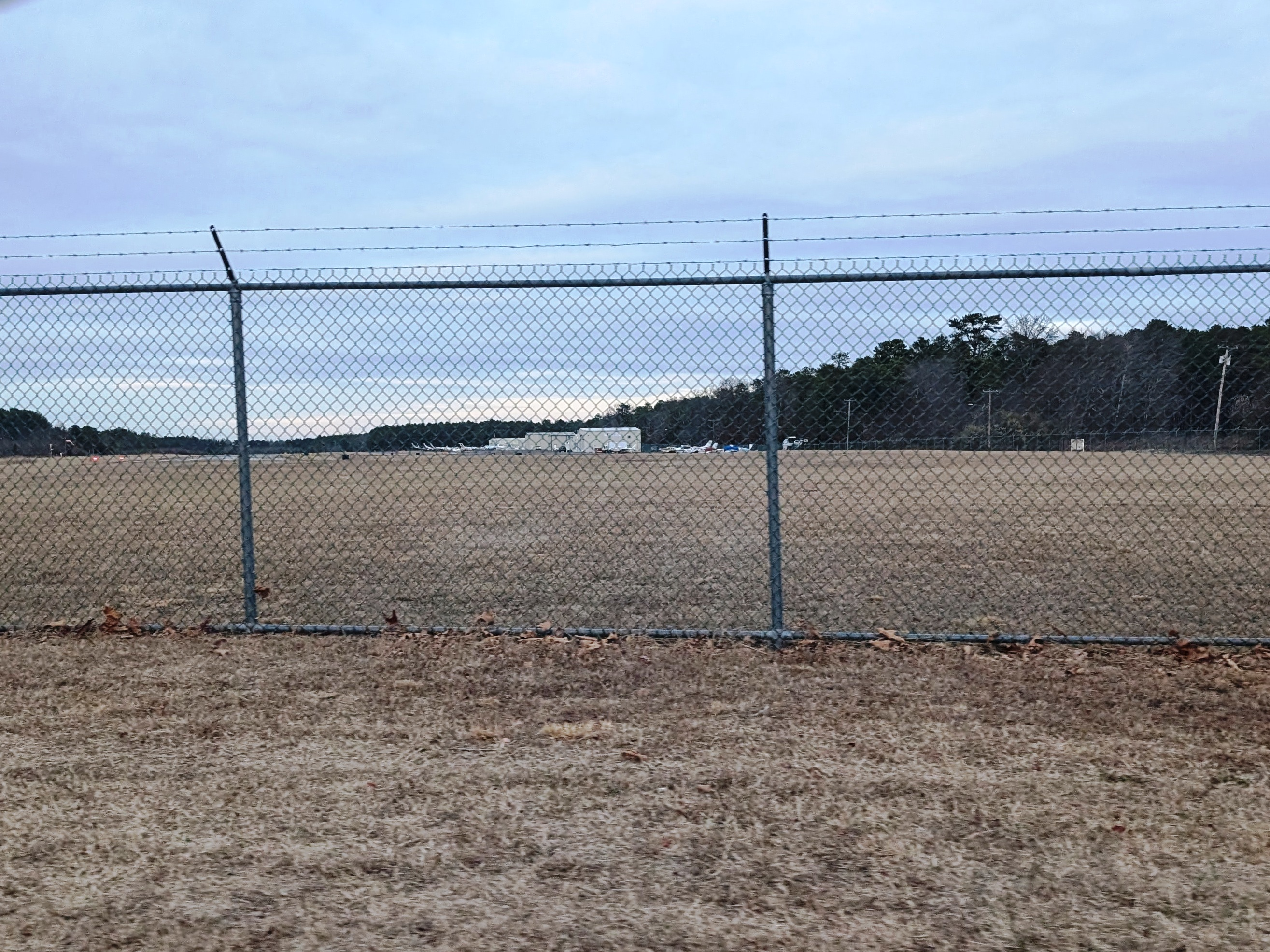
- Airport as seen from Airport Road
- IATA: none; ICAO: none; FAA LID: N81

Summary
- Airport type: Public use
- Owner: Town of Hammonton
- Operator: Jerry Barberio
- Serves: Hammonton, New Jersey
- Location: Atlantic County, New Jersey
- Elevation AMSL: 65 ft (20 m)

Map
- Interactive map of Hammonton Municipal Airport

Runways
Direction	Length		Surface
Direction	ft	m	Surface
3/21	3,601	1,098	Asphalt

Statistics (2022)
- Aircraft operations (year ending July 31, 2022): 20,400
- Based aircraft: 33
- Source: Federal Aviation Administration

Hammonton Municipal Airport (FAA LID: N81) is a public-use airport located three nautical miles (5.6 km; 3.5 mi) northeast of the central business district of the town of Hammonton in Atlantic County, New Jersey, United States. The airport is publicly owned.

== Facilities and aircraft ==
Hammonton Municipal Airport covers an area of 107 acres (43 ha) at an elevation of 65 feet (20 m) above mean sea level. It has one runway designated 03/21 with an asphalt surface measuring 3,601 by 75 feet (1,098 x 23 m).

For the 12-month period ending July 31, 2022, the airport had 20,400 aircraft operations, an average of 56 per day: 100% general aviation. At that time there were 33 aircraft based at this airport: 13 single-engine, 12 multi-engine and 8 helicopters.

== Accidents and incidents ==
- On 28 December 2025, two helicopters collided in midair over the airport.

== See also ==
- List of airports in New Jersey
