= Little Ferry Seaplane Base =

Coordinates: 40°50′34″N 074°01′48″W

- IATA: none; ICAO: none; FAA LID: 2N7

Summary
- Airport type: Public use
- Owner/Operator: Anastasios G. Georgas
- Serves: Little Ferry, New Jersey
- Location: Bergen County, New Jersey
- Elevation AMSL: 0 ft / 0 m

Map
- Interactive map of Little Ferry Seaplane Base

Runways
Direction	Length		Surface
Direction	ft	m	Surface
1/19	5,500	1,676	Water

Statistics (2015)
- Aircraft operations: 0
- Based aircraft: 0
- Source: Federal Aviation Administration

Little Ferry Seaplane Base (FAA LID: 2N7) is a public-use seaplane base located one nautical mile (1.852 km) east of the central business district of the borough of Little Ferry on the Hackensack River in Bergen County, New Jersey, United States. The base is privately owned. Although the Federal Aviation Administration still lists the base as active, New Jersey has prohibited operating seaplanes on navigable waterways since 2015, and no dock facilities have been deemed unsafe.

== Facilities and aircraft ==
Little Ferry Seaplane Base covers an area of 1 acre (0.40 ha) at an elevation of 0 feet (0 m) above mean sea level. It has one runway designated 01/19 with a water surface measuring 5,500 by 150 feet (1,676 x 45 m).

For the 12-month period ending December 31, 2014 the base had 0 aircraft operations. At that time, 0 aircraft were based there.
