= Bradford Field (New Jersey) =

- IATA: none; ICAO: none; FAA LID: ~~NJ49~~

Summary
- Airport type: Private
- Owner: Howard A. Greenwald
- Location: Flemington, New Jersey
- Elevation AMSL: 530 ft (160 m)
- Coordinates: 40°30′02″N 074°57′22″W

Map
- Interactive map of Bradford Field

Runways
Direction	Length		Surface
Direction	ft	m	Surface
6/24	1,800	549	Turf
- Source: Federal Aviation Administration

Bradford Field (FAA LID: ~~NJ49~~) was a private-use airport located four miles (6.4 km) west of the central business district of Flemington, a borough in Hunterdon County, New Jersey, United States. It was privately owned by Howard A. Greenwald.
