= Trenton–Robbinsville Airport =

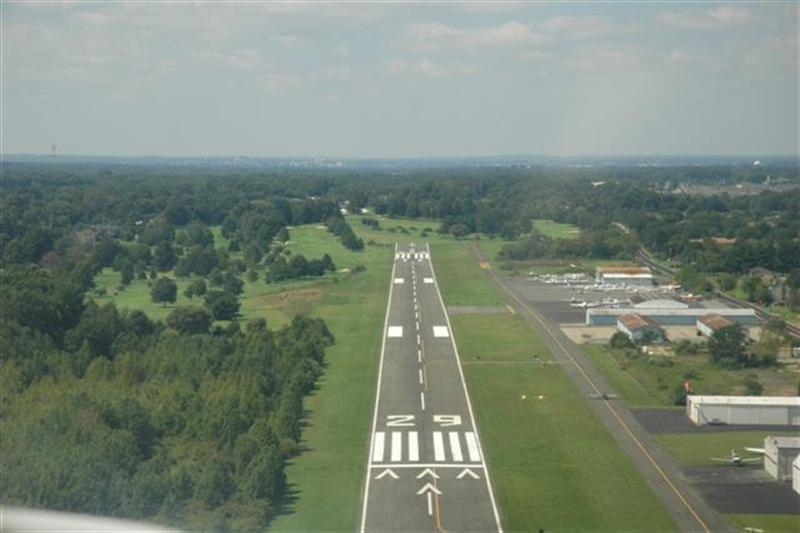
- IATA: none; ICAO: none; FAA LID: N87

Summary
- Airport type: Public use
- Owner: TRA Inc.
- Location: Robbinsville, New Jersey
- Elevation AMSL: 118 ft / 36 m
- Coordinates: 40°12′50″N 074°36′06″W
- Website: RobbinsvilleAirport.com

Map
- Interactive map of Trenton–Robbinsville Airport

Runways
Direction	Length		Surface
Direction	ft	m	Surface
11/29	4,275	1,303	Asphalt

Statistics (2023)
- Aircraft operations (year ending 3/31/2023): 26,500
- Based aircraft: 37
- Source: Federal Aviation Administration

Trenton–Robbinsville Airport (FAA LID: N87) is a privately owned, public use airport a mile east of the center of Robbinsville in Mercer County, New Jersey, United States. The National Plan of Integrated Airport Systems for 2011–2015 categorized it as a general aviation reliever airport.

The airport is next to Miry Run Golf Course on Sharon Road just off Route 130. Trenton–Robbinsville Airport offers gas, lessons, rental planes, and hangars for private planes. Cutting Edge Aviation and Aviation Charters, at the west end of the field, offers full service aircraft maintenance.

== Facilities ==
Trenton–Robbinsville Airport covers 139 acres (56 ha) at an elevation of 118 feet (36 m). Its one runway, 11/29, is 4,275 by 75 feet (1,303 x 23 m).

In the year ending March 31, 2023, the airport had 26,500 general aviation aircraft operations, average 73 per day. 37 aircraft were then based at this airport: 31 single-engine, and 6 multi-engine.

Air Mods Flight Center operates a flight school and an airplane repair shop at the airport with mainly Piper aircraft.

== See also ==
- List of airports in New Jersey
