= Hackettstown Airport =

- IATA: none; ICAO: none; FAA LID: N05

Summary
- Airport type: Public use
- Owner/Operator: Jennifer Schwanda
- Serves: Hackettstown, New Jersey
- Location: Mansfield Township, Warren County, New Jersey
- Elevation AMSL: 670 ft (200 m)
- Coordinates: 40°49′18.4″N 074°51′15″W
- Website: hackettstownairport.com

Map
- Interactive map of Hackettstown Airport

Runways
Direction	Length		Surface
Direction	ft	m	Surface
5/23	2,200	671	Asphalt

Statistics (2006)
- Aircraft operations: 19,000
- Based aircraft: 36
- Source: Federal Aviation Administration

Hackettstown Airport (FAA LID: N05) is a public-use airport located in the Beattystown area of Mansfield Township, Warren County, New Jersey, United States, three nautical miles (5.56 km) southwest of the central business district of Hackettstown. The airport is privately owned. Although most U.S. airports use the same three-letter location identifier for the FAA and IATA, this airport is assigned N05 by the FAA but has no designation from the IATA.

== Facilities and aircraft ==
Hackettstown Airport covers an area of 65 acres (26 ha) at an elevation of 670 feet (204 m) above mean sea level. It has one runway designated 05/23 with an asphalt surface measuring 2,200 by 50 feet (671 x 15 m).

For the 12-month period ending January 1, 2006, the airport had 19,000 aircraft operations, an average of 52 per day: 100% general aviation. At that time there were 36 aircraft based at this airport: 100% single-engine.
