= Relief airport =

Airport made to add additional capacity

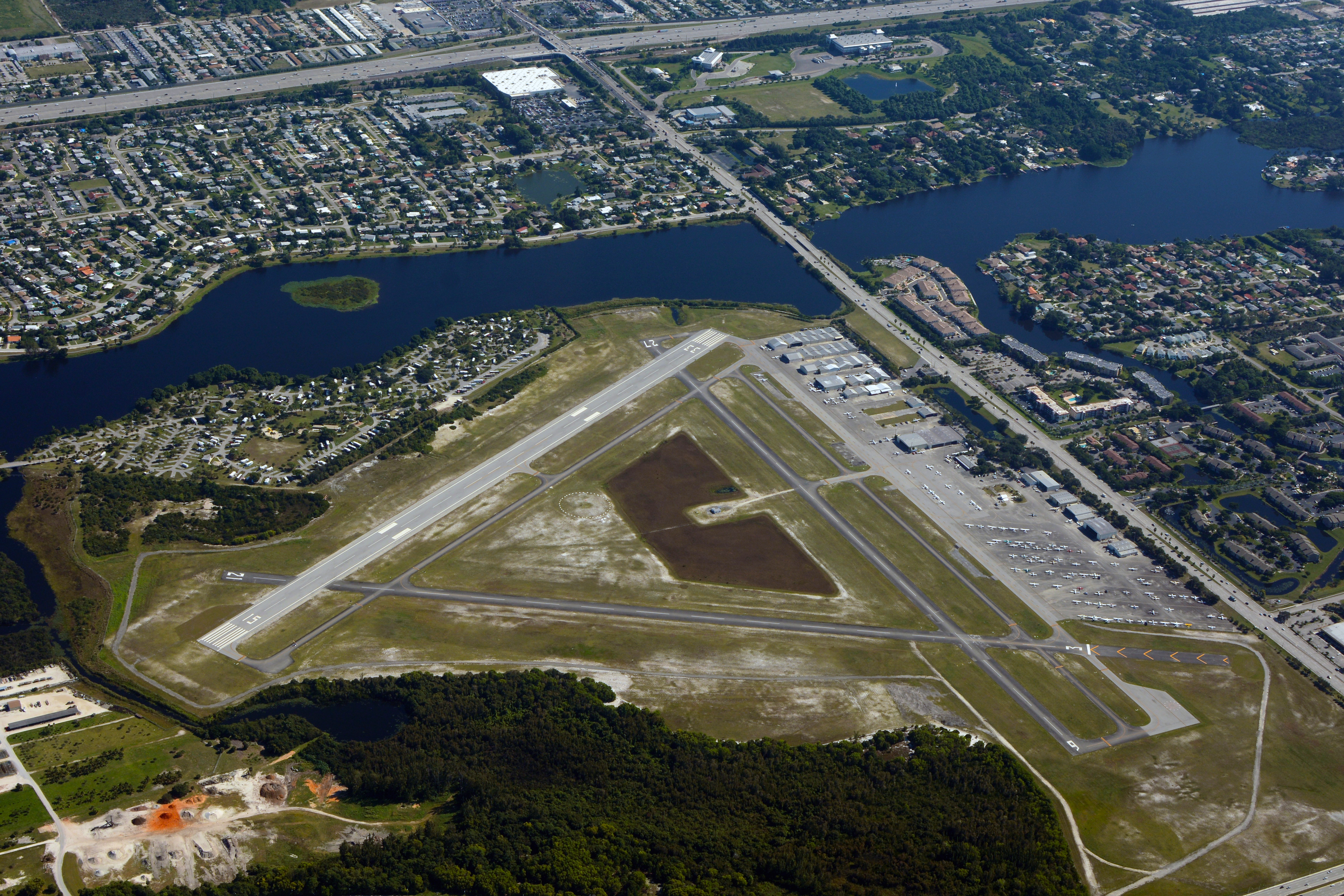
Palm Beach County Park Airport

A relief airport or reliever airport is an airport that is built or designated to provide relief or additional capacity to an area when the primary commercial airport(s) requires additional capacity, on a long-term or temporary basis.

== Usage ==
Reliever airports also relieves the need for capacity by relocating non-jet general aviation activity from a commercial airport to a different facility.

By removing aircraft with lower capacities and slower speeds, the commercial service airport is able to operate more flights with larger aircraft and handle more passengers increasing the efficiency with minimal additional cost in facilities. This also spreads out the aircraft over a wider area generally improving air traffic in the entire community.

== Examples ==
In the United States, for an airport to qualify as a FAA-designated reliever, it must have 100 or more based aircraft or 25,000 annual itinerant operations.

== See also ==
- Airport slot
- Executive airport, a marketing term employed to promote general aviation to corporate jet travelers
- FAA airport categories
- List of cities with more than one commercial airport
