= East 34th Street Heliport =

Heliport in New York City

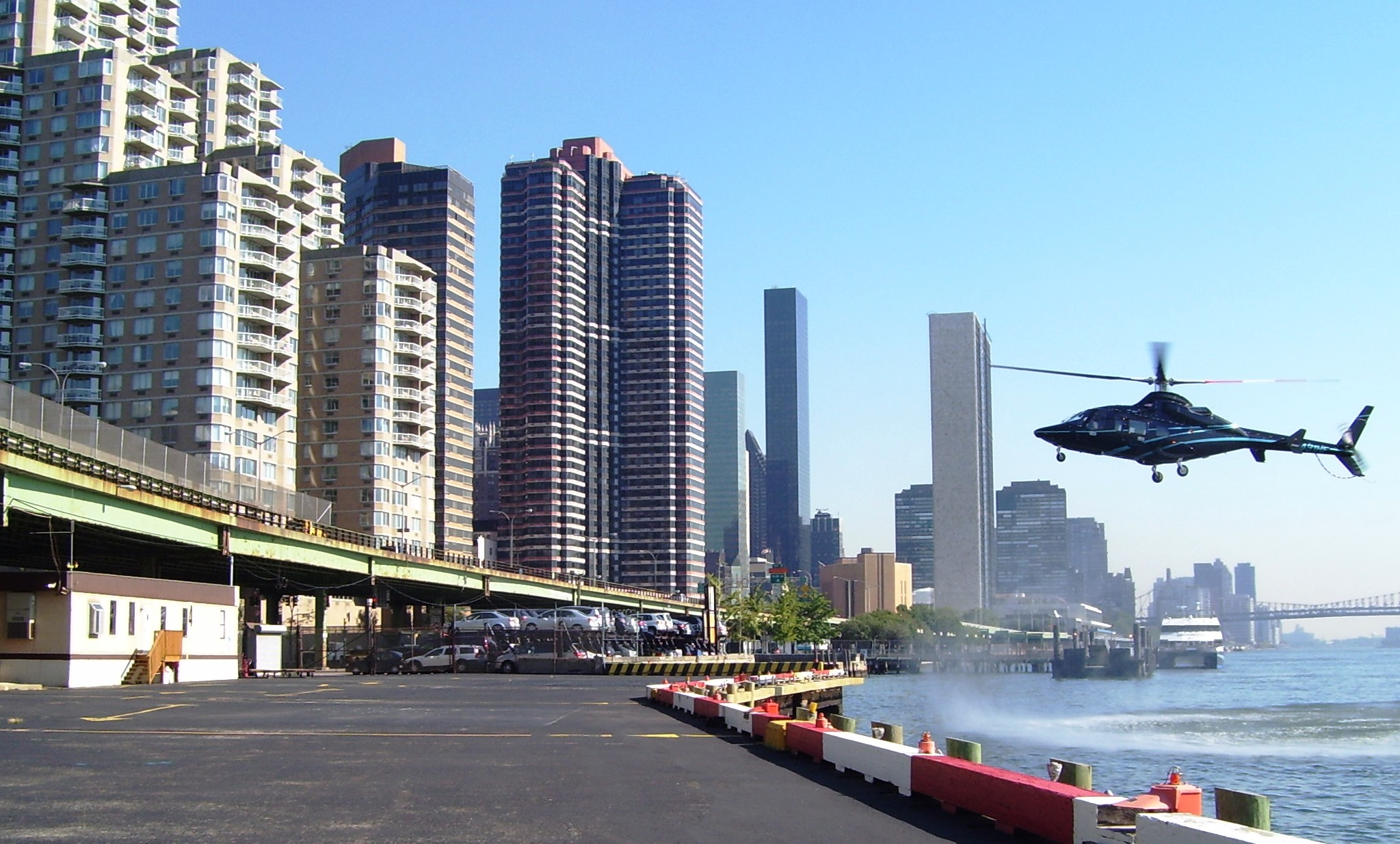
- IATA: none; ICAO: none; FAA LID: 6N5

Summary
- Airport type: Public
- Owner: Economic Development Corp
- Operator: Atlantic Aviation
- Serves: New York City
- Location: East 34th Street, New York, NY 10016
- Opened: June 16, 1972
- Elevation AMSL: 10 ft (3.0 m)
- Coordinates: 40°44′33″N 073°58′19″W
- Website: Official website

Map
- Interactive map of East 34th Street Heliport

Helipads
Number	Length		Surface
Number	ft	m	Surface
1	304	93	Asphalt
2	44	13	Asphalt
3	44	13	Asphalt
4	44	13	Asphalt
T	44	13	Asphalt
- Source: Airnav

East 34th Street Heliport (FAA LID: 6N5) is a heliport on the east side of Manhattan located on the East River Greenway, between the East River and the FDR Drive viaduct. Also known as the Atlantic Metroport at East 34th Street, it is a public heliport owned by New York City and run by the Economic Development Corporation.

== History ==
=== Planning and development ===
In the mid-1960s, New York officials were mulling sites for heliports, particularly waterfront sites because of concerns about noise and the safety of operating rotorcraft above Manhattan.

In 1964, Vincent A. G. O'Connor, a former commissioner of the city's Marine and Aviation Department, told The New York Times that a site on the East River waterfront near East 34th Street was one of the preferred options because a viaduct was being planned to carry FDR Drive across East 34th Street, removing a bottleneck caused by a traffic signal on the at-grade highway.

In 1965, a helipad opened on the roof of the Pan Am Building on Manhattan's East Side, despite opposition to its location away from the waterfront.

In 1966, New York City Mayor John Lindsay asked the Triborough Bridge and Tunnel Authority and Port of New York Authority to study a new facility east of First Avenue between East 36th and 38th streets that would include a 2,000-space parking garage with a rooftop heliport that could provide intercity passenger service; the facility was never built for lack of money.

The heliport atop the Pan Am Building was abandoned in 1968 after failing to make enough money. (It reopened for three months in 1977 before a helicopter crash killed five people). The city's Marine and Aviation Department sought to replace the Pan Am heliport by building a helipad next to the East River at East 34th Street. This was approved by the New York City Planning Commission in March 1971 and the New York City Board of Estimate the following month. The heliport was built on a concrete bulkhead that had been used by the Lehigh Valley Railroad and before that had been the site of the original East 34th Street Ferry Landing.

=== Opening and early years ===
The East 34th Street Heliport was built to handle about 20 private and charter flights per day of four-passenger helicopters. Its design included an option to expand onto a purpose-built pier into the East River, enabling the heliport to accommodate 30- to 48-passenger helicopters providing scheduled service to regional airports or for intercity service, for a total of 50 to 60 daily flights.

The heliport opened on June 16, 1972, and began operating three days later with charter flights. In October 1973, Island Helicopters Corporation signed a ten-year lease with the city to operate the heliport and be its fixed-base operator.

In 1979, WCBS-TV contracted with Island Helicopters to base a Bell LongRanger at the heliport to rapidly deploy reporters and film crews around the area, including to the suburbs, and to provide live television coverage from the air. By 1980, most of the flights were for sightseeing. The heliport saw an average of 29 flights per day in 1976, 40 in 1978, and 67 flights in 1980.

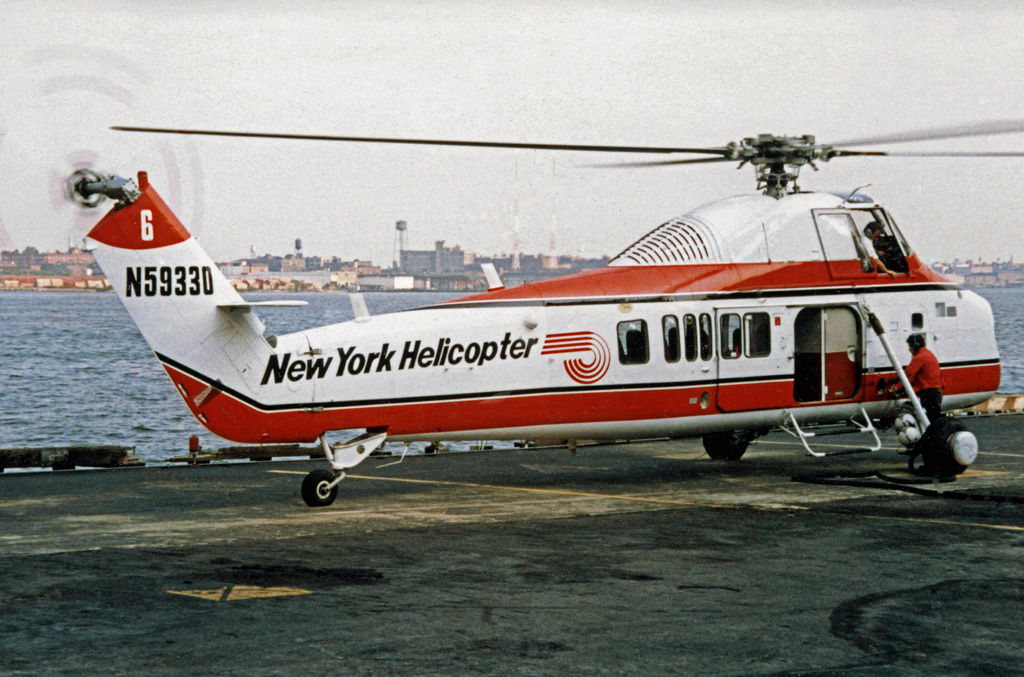
New York Helicopter Sikorsky S-58 at East 34th Street Heliport in 1987

In January 1981, New York Helicopter, a new subsidiary of Island Helicopters, began offering scheduled service— 48 daily flights on weekdays and 28 daily flights on weekends—from the heliport to the three major airports serving the city: John F. Kennedy, La Guardia and Newark. The airline used the nine-seat Aérospatiale Dauphin until 1985, then the 14-seat turbine-powered Sikorsky S-58T. Service to the three airports increased to a total of 72 daily flights during the mid-1980s, but then shrank by the early 1990s. Service to LaGuardia ended in November 1987, to Newark in 1991, and to JFK in January 1994.

Traffic at the heliport peaked in 1985 with an average of 85 flights per day. In 1987, two years after the Rivergate apartment building opened on East 34th Street between First Avenue and the FDR Drive, tenants complained about the helicopter noise and asked city officials to forbid flights between 11 p.m. and 7 a.m. At the time, the heliport was the only one in the city operating 24 hours a day. The apartment building also discovered that the special permit granted by the City Planning Commission for the heliport had expired in 1976 and was never renewed, and asked the New York City Board of Standards and Appeals to determine which city agency regulated the facility.

=== Later operation ===
Island Helicopters was found to have underreported its income from 1975 to 1980, was sued by the city, and filed for bankruptcy. It continued to provide service. In 1988, an audit by New York City Comptroller Harrison J. Goldin found that Island Helicopters was understating its revenue and owed the city $287,000 in rent; the company agreed to pay this sum plus the accrued interest. As part of its original dispute with the city over unpaid rent, the company had agreed to apply for a renewal of the special permit for the heliport and began to prepare an Environmental Impact Statement (EIS). The city, through its Economic Development Corporation (EDC), later assumed responsibility for completing the EIS as part of the second dispute over unpaid rent. Island Helicopters had previously renewed the option on its original lease with the city, which was set to expire in October 1995.

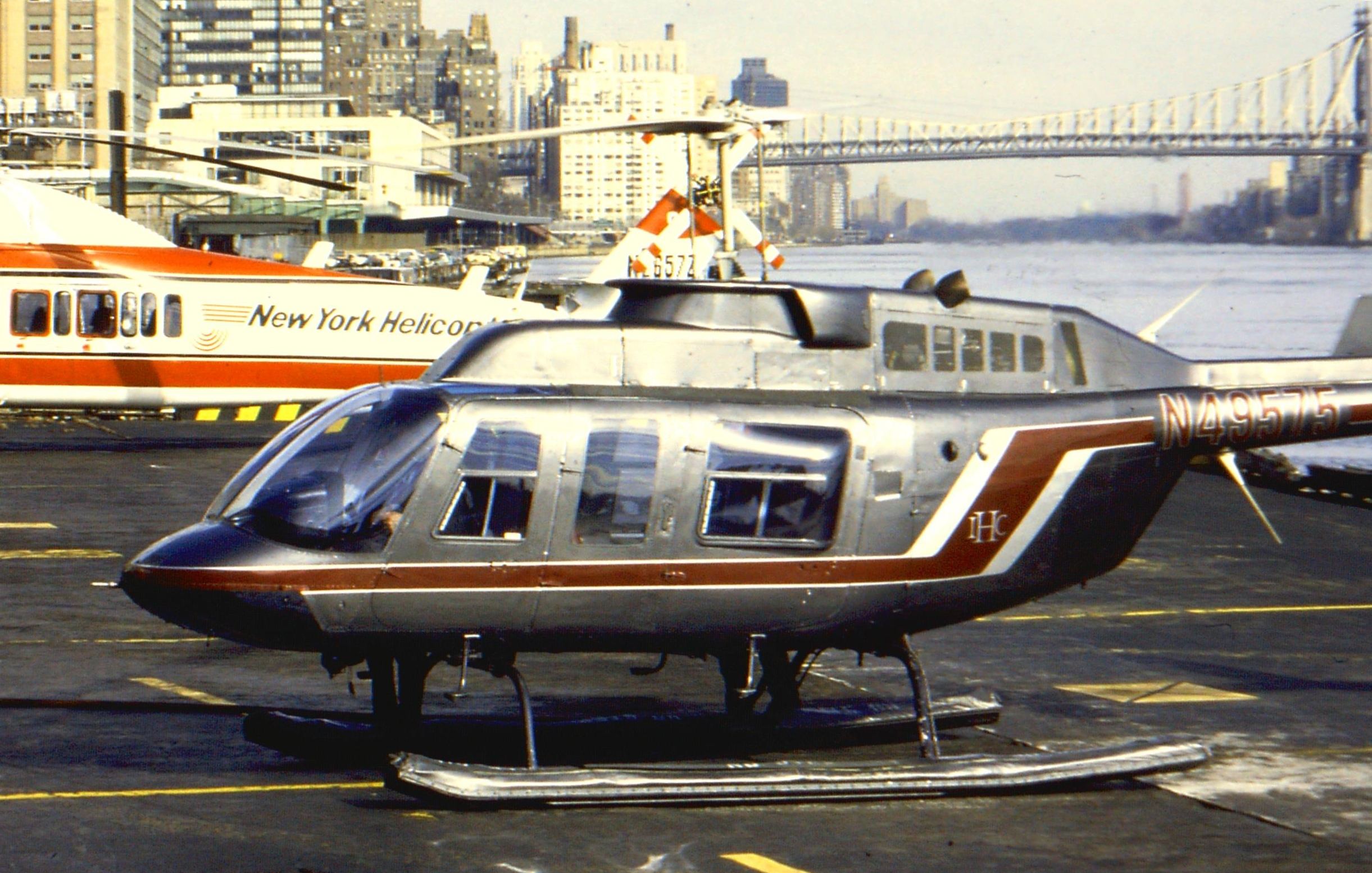
A helicopter used for sightseeing flights parked at the heliport in 1987

Noise complaints led the city to reduce the number of permitted flights to and from the heliport by 47 percent. At the time, the East 34th Street Heliport was believed to be the busiest public-use heliport in the world. The nearby New York University Medical Center also expressed concerns about pollution.

In May 1996, EDC issued a request for proposals from heliport operators; it included limits on takeoffs, landings, and operating hours. Island Helicopters (operating as National Helicopter) sued the city over the restrictions to flights, arguing that the limits could force it into bankruptcy. Federal district judge Sonia Sotomayor decided in favor of National Helicopter. The city appealed the ruling.

The city then moved to evict National Helicopter from the East 34th Street Heliport over its failure to pay $700,000 in back rent. It also planned to close the East 60th Street Heliport, moving its operator (Johnson Controls, which did not operate sightseeing flights) to the East 34th Street Heliport. National Helicopter filed for federal bankruptcy protection in an attempt to prevent the eviction, but the company's request was dismissed. The company was ultimately evicted from the heliport in August 1997, which brought an end to the sightseeing flights. The following year, a federal appellate court ruled that the city could restrict flights at the East 34th Street Heliport; the city imposed operating hours of 8 a.m. to 8 p.m. on weekdays and 10 a.m. to 6 p.m. on weekends. Weekend flights were banned altogether later in the year.

In March 2003, Macquarie Infrastructure Corporation was selected as the new fixed-base operator of the heliport. The heliport is operated by Atlantic Aviation, a subsidiary of Macquarie.

In February 2007, US Helicopter began providing passenger service from the 34th Street Heliport to JFK and Newark airports. Through the Transportation Security Administration's Screening Partnership Program, passengers checked baggage and underwent security screening at the heliport and disembarked at the airside zone of the terminals of partner airlines, bypassing the need to check luggage or go through security at the airport if their flight was departing from the same terminal. Flights to JFK Airport originally operated to Gate C43 in American Airlines' Terminal 9 and were shifted to Gate 11 in Delta Air Lines' Terminal 3 in May 2007 due to the construction of American's new terminal. Flights to Newark Airport operated to Gate 71 at Continental Airlines' Terminal C. The passenger flights ended in September 2009 when US Helicopter shut down its operations due to financial difficulties.

Atlantic Aviation's operation of the heliport was renewed for five years in October 2024. Under its agreement with EDC, Atlantic will add charging stations for electric vertical take-off and landing (eVTOL) aircraft within a year of Federal Aviation Administration certification for commercial operations of eVTOLs. New York City has been announced as a launch market for eVTOLs; Archer Aviation and Joby Aviation plan to operate eVTOL air taxis to the airports serving the city. Atlantic has been working with Archer, Beta Technologies, and Joby to make sure the heliport can accommodate all certified eVTOLs and plans to install both Combined Charging System (CCS) and global electric aviation charging system (GEACS) chargers. The heliport plans to continue accommodating conventional aircraft. On May 1, 2026, the heliport hosted a demonstration flight of an eVTOL air taxi operated by Joby Aviation.

== Current operations ==
Since this is a heliport and not an airport, there are no instrument procedures for this facility. Boats in the nearby East River require pilots to be careful when approaching the heliport's landing pad.

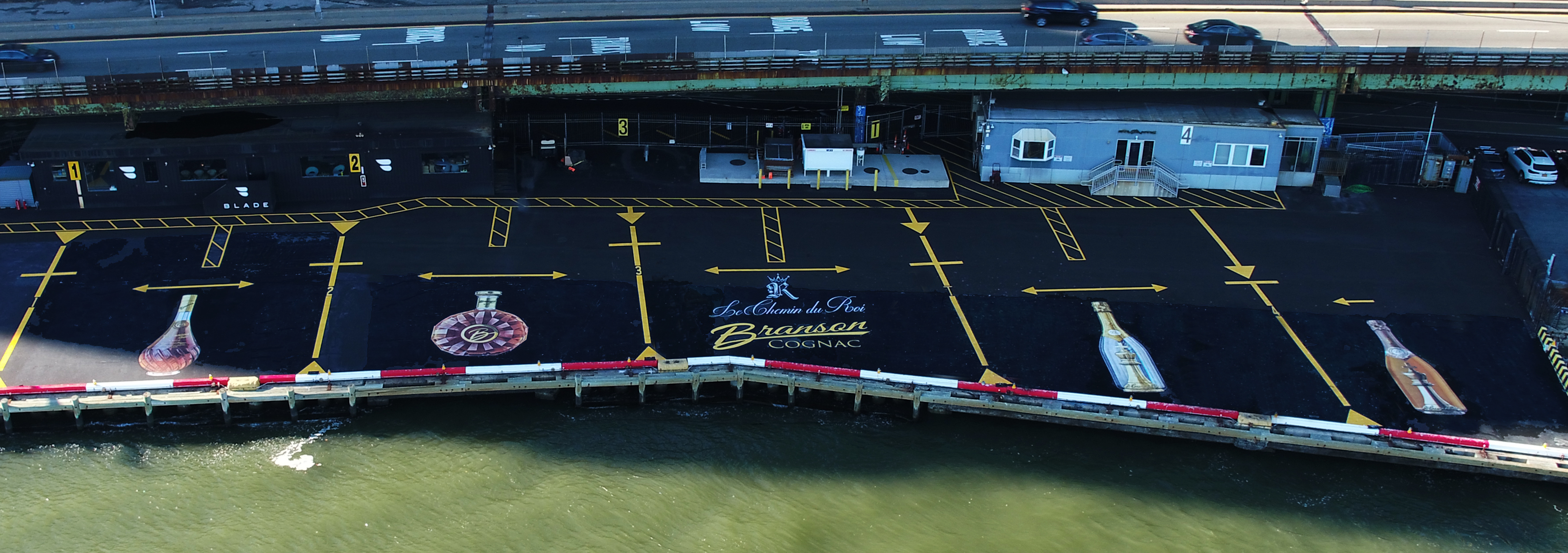
East 34th Street Heliport

== Statistics ==
In 2010, 72% of the flights were air taxi, 18% general aviation, 9% commuters, and less than 1% military. In 2017, 96% were air taxi, 3% transient general aviation, and 2% military.

== Accidents and incidents ==
- On May 23, 1974, David Frank Kamaiko, a 21-year-old man from Greenwich Village claiming to be a member of the Jewish Defense League, hijacked a helicopter from the East 34th Street Heliport and demanded $2 million in ransom. The helicopter's pilot landed on top of the Pan Am Building, then tried to escape; Kamaiko shot him in the arm. The other hostage inside the helicopter disarmed Kamaiko, and police took him into custody.
- On February 27, 1975, a Bell 47G-2A on a non-commercial flight from Garden City crashed into a fence while attempting to land at the 34th Street Heliport in gusty winds. The pilot was severely burned in the resulting fire, but survived.
- On April 26, 1985, the engine on an Aérospatiale SA 360 Dauphin operated by New York Helicopter failed shortly after takeoff from the heliport, sending the helicopter into the East River. Five passengers and two crewmembers were rescued but one passenger trapped inside the submerged craft was killed.
- On May 2, 1988, a Bell 206-B on a sightseeing flight around Manhattan crashed into the East River near Long Island City while preparing to land at the East 34th Street Heliport, killing one person and injuring four others.
- On February 10, 1990, a strong gust of wind sent a Bell 206-L on a sightseeing flight crashing into the East River shortly after taking off from the East 34th Street Heliport. A 14-year-old boy was unconscious when pulled from the wreckage and later died. The pilot and three other passengers (including the boy's father and two French tourists) were injured in the crash but survived.
- On June 17, 2005, a Sikorsky S-76C carrying six MBNA executives returning to Delaware after a business meeting in New York City crashed into the East River less than one minute after taking off from the East 34th Street Heliport. All eight aboard survived the crash.
- On October 4, 2011, a Bell 206 crashed into the East River, killing one person, after taking off from the East 34th Street Heliport. The pilot and three other passengers on board were rescued, though one died of his injuries a week later. The National Transportation Safety Board report on the crash, released on December 20, 2012, said the cause was excess weight in the helicopter; the aircraft is rated to carry 3,200 pounds (1,451 kg), but it was estimated to have weighed between 3,228 pounds (1,464 kg) and 3,461 pounds (1,570 kg) at takeoff.
- On June 10, 2019, an AgustaWestland AW109 Power en route to Linden, New Jersey, crashed into the Axa Equitable Center on Seventh Avenue, which sparked a fire on the top of the building and killed the pilot, Tim McCormack.

== See also ==
- Aviation in the New York metropolitan area
- Downtown Manhattan Wall Street Heliport
- East 34th Street Ferry Landing
- List of airports in New York
- West 30th Street Heliport
