= 1990 East River helicopter crash =

Sightseeing helicopter crash in New York City

Coordinates: 40°44′32″N 73°58′17″W

The 1990 East River helicopter crash occurred on February 10, 1990, when a sightseeing helicopter carrying five people plunged into the East River shortly after takeoff from the East 34th Street Heliport in Manhattan, New York City. The crash critically injured 13-year-old Robert Faller, who was trapped underwater in the wreckage for nearly 20 minutes. Despite rescue and medical efforts, Faller died five days later. The crash was the third fatal incident involving Island Helicopter Corporation near the same heliport within a five-year span.

== Accident ==
The helicopter, a Bell 206-L JetRanger operated by Island Helicopter Corporation, took off from the East 34th Street Heliport just after 3:00 p.m. on February 10, 1990. On board were the pilot, Charles Rodda, and four passengers: Robert Faller, his father Bernard Faller, and two French tourists, Eric Denoul and Fabienne Gomet.

Witnesses reported seeing sparks, smoke, and flames coming from the helicopter's rotors as it struggled to gain altitude. Moments later, it crashed into the river about 50 yards (46 m) offshore, flipped upside down, and drifted with the current. While the pilot and three other passengers escaped, Faller remained strapped in his seat and submerged in the wreckage.

Police divers responded quickly, and Detective Kevin Brodley pulled Faller to the surface after nearly 20 minutes underwater. He was placed on a respirator in Bellevue Hospital's intensive care unit, but never regained consciousness. He died five days later on February 15, 1990.

The boy had been visiting his father for the weekend and was on a sightseeing flight when the accident occurred. His father reportedly dove into the water in an attempt to rescue him. Faller was a student at Woodmere Middle School in Long Island.

== Investigation ==
The National Transportation Safety Board (NTSB) opened an investigation into the crash. The pilot stated that a sudden gust of wind may have struck the helicopter's tail during liftoff, causing one of the skids to hit the water. He reported hearing a bang but was unsure if it occurred before or after impact.

Some witnesses claimed they saw smoke or fire, but NTSB officials stated there was no evidence of fire or mechanical failure. Investigators were also examining a cracked engine part—a power turbine governor—that was sent to Washington, D.C. for further analysis.

The crash was the third involving Island Helicopter Corporation in five years. Previous accidents in 1985 and 1988 also involved fatalities near the East River.

== Aftermath ==
The incident renewed scrutiny of sightseeing helicopter safety and operations over Manhattan and the East River. Several emergency responders and civilians who assisted in the rescue were treated for exposure. Two civilians who attempted rescues were hospitalized.

The only fatality in the crash, Robert Faller, was remembered by his school community as a bright and inquisitive student. He had recently received a medal for academic excellence in a program sponsored by Hofstra University and had celebrated his bar mitzvah in December 1989. Neighbors described him as "the sweetest, nicest kid," with a fondness for Nintendo and strong performance in school.

== Memorials ==
Robert Faller has been memorialized through a series of educational initiatives. In 2012, the Robert H. Faller Environmental Pond was dedicated at Woodmere Middle School in Long Island, where Faller had been a student. Designed and constructed by sixth-grade students with help from professionals, the pond became the focal point of the school's environmental learning center.

The environmental center includes a greenhouse, native plant gardens, butterfly habitats, and multiple biome simulations. It supports interdisciplinary education and continues to be used by students year-round.

The project was funded by the Robert Faller Foundation, a nonprofit created by Faller's family to support education in his memory. In addition to the pond, the foundation funds educational materials, memorial scholarships, and special programs across the Hewlett-Woodmere school district.

The Robert Faller Award was also established to honor students who embody curiosity, resilience, and a commitment to community. The first recipients of the award were Robert Schlaff and David Spiro.

== See also ==
- East River
- National Transportation Safety Board
