= New York Airways =

US helicopter airline (1949–1979)

| IATA | ICAO | Call sign |
|---|---|---|
| NY | NY | NEW YORK |
- Founded: 1949; 77 years ago
- Ceased operations: 1979; 47 years ago
- Focus cities: New York City
- Destinations: See Destinations below
- Parent company: See Fleet below
- Headquarters: LaGuardia Airport; Flushing, New York, United States

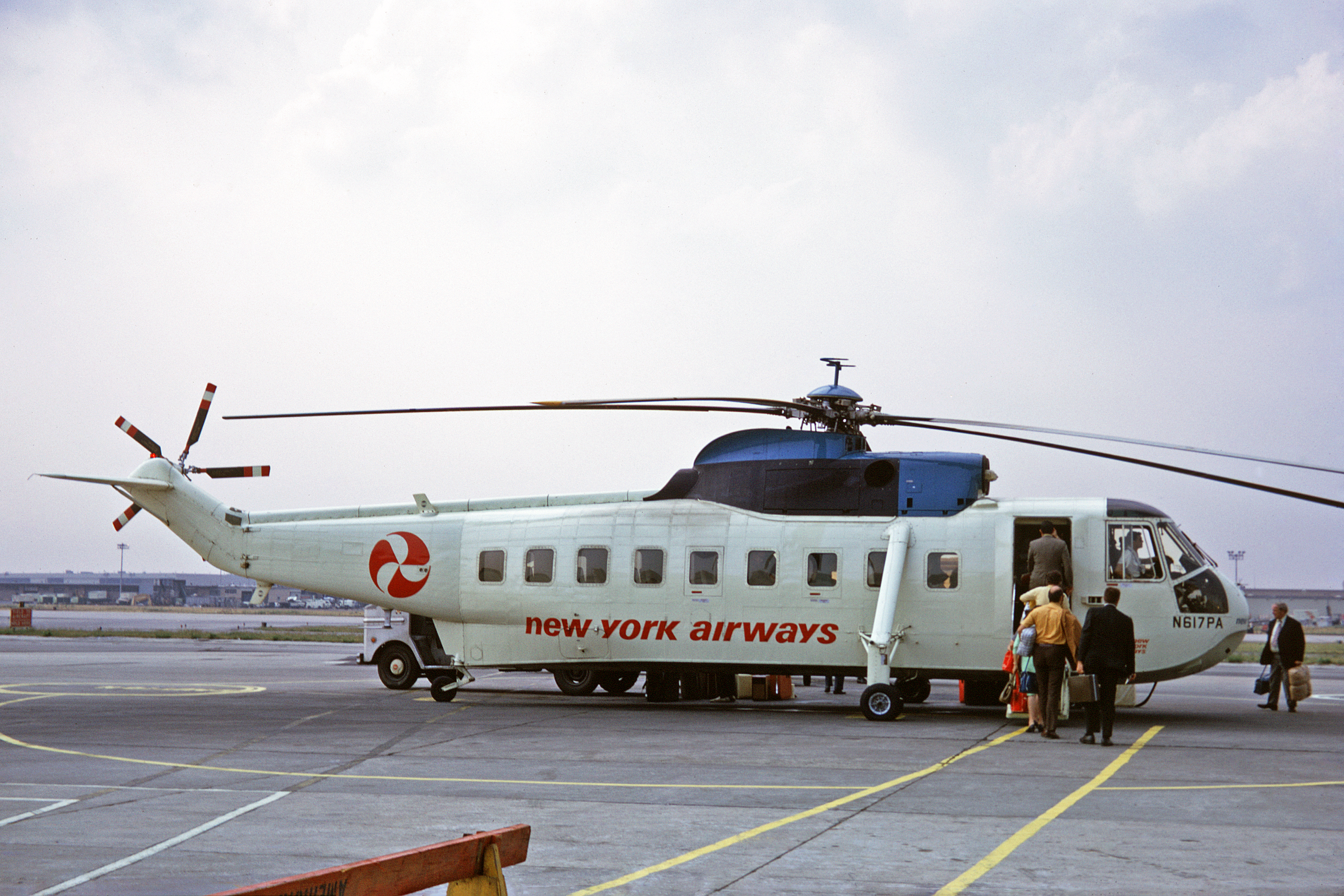
S-61 JFK Airport 1970

New York Airways was an American helicopter airline in the New York City area, founded in 1949 as a mail and cargo carrier. On 8 July 1953 it may have been the first scheduled helicopter airline to carry passengers in the United States, with headquarters at LaGuardia Airport. Although primarily a helicopter airline operator with scheduled passenger operations, New York Airways also flew fixed wing aircraft, such as the de Havilland Canada DHC-6 Twin Otter 19-passenger STOL twin turboprop aircraft.

== History ==
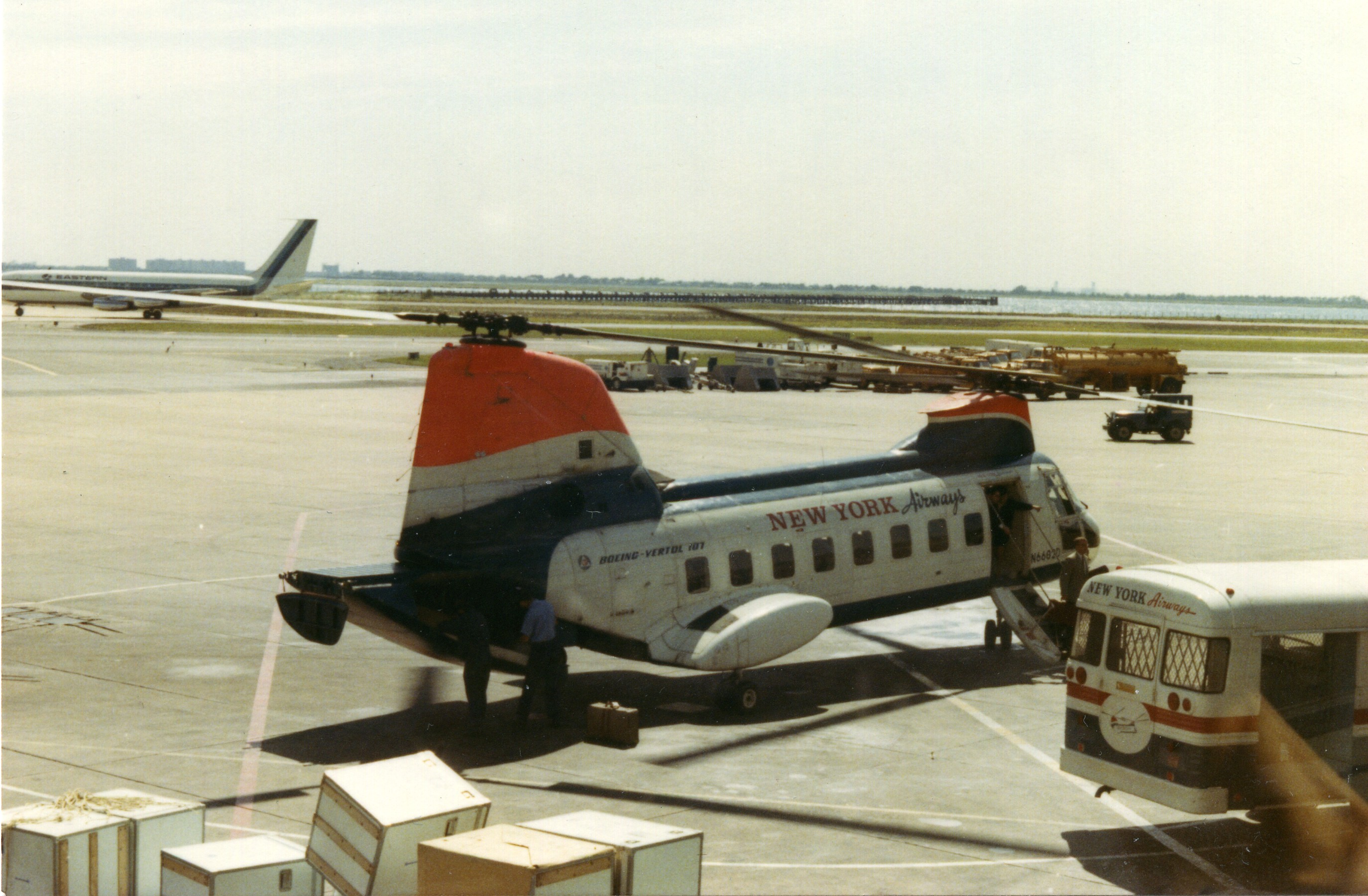
New York Airways Boeing Vertol 107-II after landing at JFK

Passenger flights started with Sikorsky S-55 helicopters, with three Sikorsky S-58s added to its five S-55s in 1956; in 1958 the Boeing Vertol V-44, a 15-seat civil version of the Piasecki H-21, took over. In 1962 they transitioned to the tandem rotor, twin turbine engine powered Boeing Vertol 107-II Turbocopter and later operated the twin turbine engine Sikorsky S-61. In February 1955 the one-way fare from LaGuardia to Idlewild was $4.50 ($54 in 2025 dollars). The aircraft was a Sikorsky H-19, registration number N418A. The trip took ten minutes and their phone number was DEfender 5-6600.

The first scheduled passenger flights to Manhattan arrived in December 1956 at the West 30th Street Heliport. The downtown heliport on East River Pier 6 opened in 1960 and New York Airways moved all its Manhattan passenger flights down there around December 1960. Due to route restrictions on the single-engine Vertol 44, nonstop flights from Manhattan to Idlewild (JFK) had to await the twin-engine Boeing Vertol 107. Moody's says in 1962 the "operating revenue" of $3.9 million included $2.2 million federal subsidy. In June 1964 they had 32 daily flights from JFK to Newark Airport and 33 returning; all flights each way between about 0900 and 1930 stopped at Wall Street. The only other flights were 15 round trips a day between JFK and the Port Authority building at the World's Fair, as La Guardia was still under construction.

Scheduled flights to the top of the Pan Am Building (now MetLife Building) began in December 1965; they ended in 1968, then resumed for a few months in 1977. In April 1966 23 flights a day flew nonstop to Pan Am's terminal at JFK, scheduled 10 minutes; passengers could check in at the Pan Am Building 40 minutes before their scheduled departure out of JFK. The downtown heliport had 13 flights a day to Newark, 5 nonstops to TWA's terminal at JFK and 12 to LGA, all of which continued to JFK. (Downtown had no weekend flights.) Soon after Pan Am Building flights resumed the March 1977 Official Airline Guide (OAG) showed 48 weekday S-61 departures from there: 12 to EWR, 14 to LGA then JFK, and 22 nonstops to JFK.

New York Airways employed the first African American airline pilot. Perry H. Young made his historic first flight on February 5, 1957. Young had previously made history as the first African American flight instructor for the United States Army Air Corps.

== Destinations ==
At its peak the airline partnered with 24 international and domestic airlines. At various times it served:

- John F. Kennedy International Airport (JFK)
- LaGuardia Airport (LGA)
- Newark Airport (EWR)
- West 30th St, Manhattan
- Pan Am Building roof-top heliport
- Wall Street Heliport 40.7013°N 74.009°W
- Battery Park City Heliport
- Stamford, Connecticut Heliport
- Teterboro Airport (TEB)
- Westchester County Airport (HPN)
- Downtown Trenton
- New Brunswick 40.467°N 74.481°W
- Hadley Field 40.555°N 74.433°W
- Morristown Municipal Airport

In 1969 the Official Airline Guide (OAG) listed some inter-airport flights using STOL Twin Otters along with the Vertol flights. Fuel prices soared after the 1973 oil crisis, damaging profitability. The airline could not recover after the 1977 Pan Am Building accident and the 1979 oil crisis, and New York Airways filed for bankruptcy on May 18, 1979. The number of passengers boarded, in thousands, scheduled flights only were 68 in 1957, 144 in 1960, 537 in 1967, 268 in 1970.

== Fleet ==
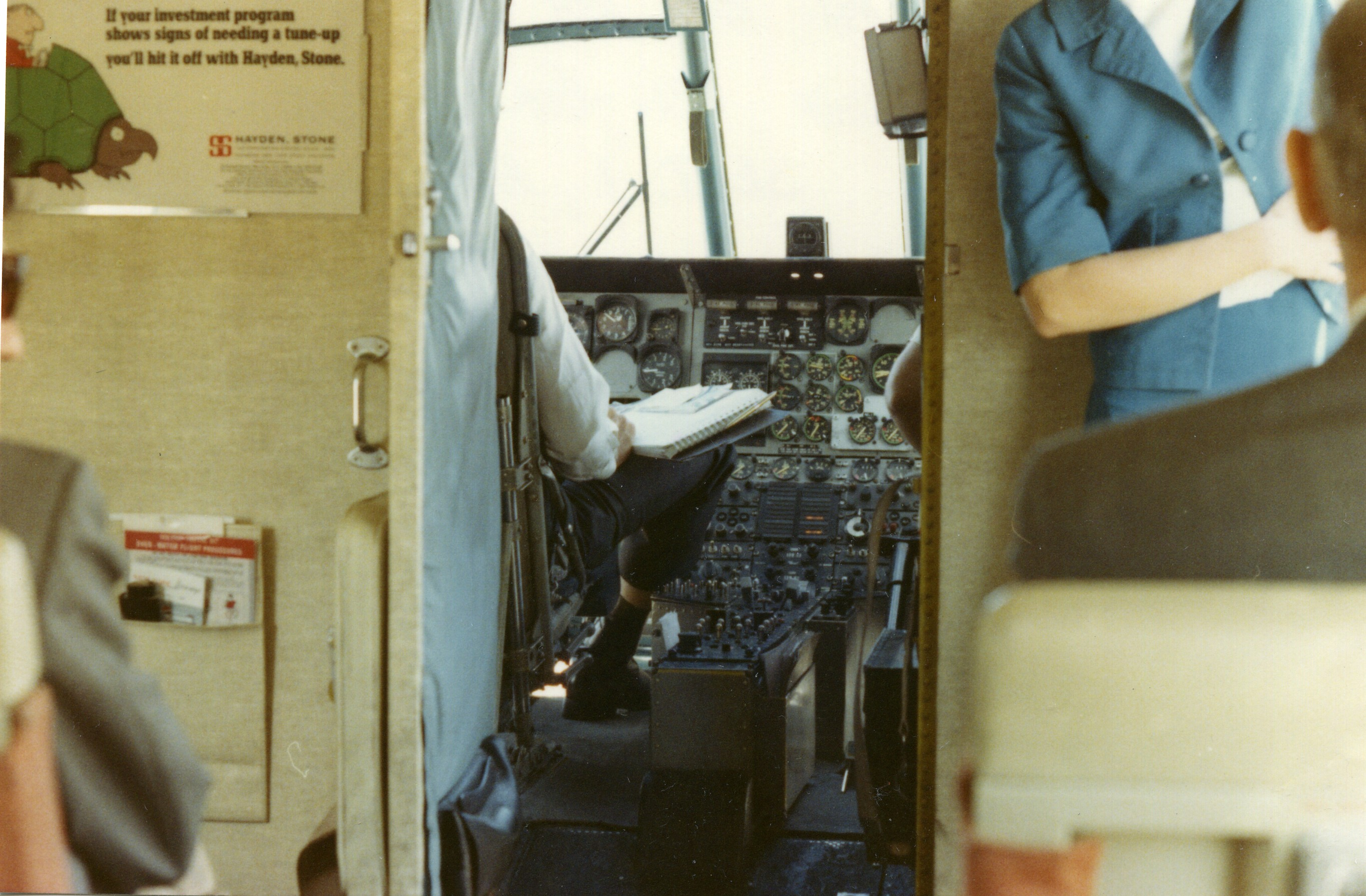
Interior shot of N6682D as it prepares to depart the Pan Am Building in September, 1967.

All surviving New York Airways Boeing Vertol 107s are now operated by Columbia Helicopters, based in Aurora, Oregon:

- N6672D
- N6674D
- N6675D
- N6676D
- N6682D
- N107PA (Operated under contract to Pan Am)
- N108PA (Operated under contract to Pan Am)

N6674D is the highest flying time helicopter in the world, with more than 82,000 flight hours since its construction in 1962.

N6682D is in the 1968 film Coogan's Bluff, starring Clint Eastwood, taking off atop the Pan Am Building. N108PA is the helicopter arriving with Eastwood.

N6676D is shown taking off from the Downtown Manhattan/Wall St. Heliport in the last of the Secret Agent 077 trilogy of films, 1966's Special Mission Lady Chaplin. It appears in the 1967 spy thriller Matchless, arriving and taking off from the Pan Am Building.

== Accidents ==
On October 14, 1963, New York Airways Flight 600, a Boeing Vertol 107, registration N6673D, crashed shortly after takeoff from Idlewild Airport (now JFK) en route to Newark via Wall Street. All three passengers and all three crew members died. The accident was caused by mechanical failure due to contaminated lubricants.

On July 15, 1969, de Havilland Canada DHC-6 Twin Otter 200 N558MA was 12 minutes behind schedule on a flight from New York to Newark, so the pilot decided to take off from a runway intersection. During initial climb the plane was caught in the wake vortex of a departing jet and crashed, killing 3 (2 crew and 1 passenger) of the 14 occupants.

On May 16, 1977, the landing gear failed on a Sikorsky S-61L (N619PA) while it was taking on passengers on the roof of the Pan Am Building. The aircraft fell onto its side. Its spinning principal rotor blades killed four passengers waiting to board (including movie director Michael Findlay) and injured a fifth. Parts of a broken blade fell into the streets below, killing one pedestrian and injuring another. The accident precipitated the permanent closure of the heliport. The Cinema Museum in London holds film of this helicopter from summer 1963.

On April 18, 1979, a Sikorsky S-61L (N618PA), while on departure climbout from Newark International Airport, experienced a fracture of one of the tail rotor blades, resulting in severe vibrations and an immediate return and descent to the airport. At about 150 feet altitude, the entire tail rotor gearbox was torn from the aircraft, resulting in an immediate and radical center of gravity change to the aircraft. This caused a severe nose down attitude and uncontrolled contact with the ground. Compounding the accident was the failure of both hydraulic systems due to the loss of the tail rotor gear box, which rendered the aircraft virtually uncontrollable. There were three fatalities and thirteen serious injuries. The airline ceased flying that day and never resumed operations, filing for bankruptcy the following month.

== See also ==
- US Helicopter
- Boeing Vertol CH-46 Sea Knight
- List of defunct airlines of the United States
