= US Helicopter =

US aviation service (2004–2009)

IATA	ICAO	Call sign
UH	USH	US HELI
- Founded: 2004; 22 years ago
- Ceased operations: September 25, 2009; 17 years ago
- Hubs: None
- Focus cities: New York City
- Frequent-flyer program: None
- Alliance: Delta Air Lines
- Subsidiaries: None
- Fleet size: 3
- Destinations: 5 scheduled, many other chartered
- Headquarters: New York City, New York
- Key people: John F. Haskins (CEO & President) Donal McSullivan (Senior VP, CMO); George J. Mehm Jr. (Senior VP, CFO & Treasurer); Terence O. Dennison (Senior VP, COO) Gabriel Roberts (VP, Finance & Administration)
- Website: FlyUSH.com (defunct) used by another organization

US Helicopter (OTCID Basic: USHP) was an independent air shuttle service that operated regularly scheduled helicopter flights from Manhattan to Newark and JFK airports. Flights left from Downtown (JRB, near Wall Street) and Midtown (TSS, East 34th Street) Manhattan Heliports to Delta Air Lines Terminal 3 at John F. Kennedy International Airport (JFK). There were also flights to and from Bridgeport, Connecticut (BDR). It was headquartered at the Downtown Manhattan Heliport, Pier 6 E River in Lower Manhattan, New York City.

== Services ==
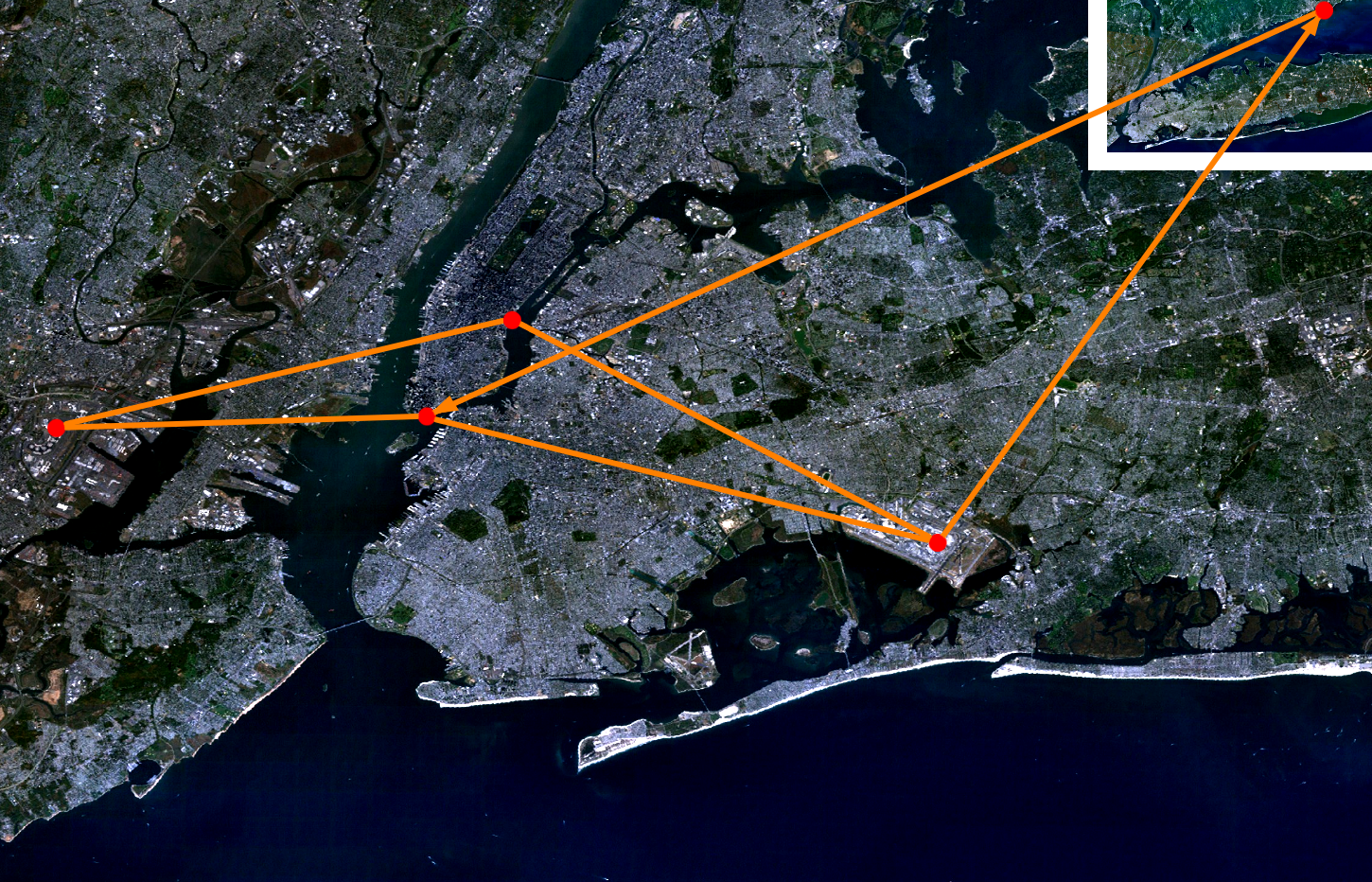
Airports served are shown as red dots. Routes are shown by orange lines.

When operating, flights to the airport lasted eight minutes and cost $159. Flights operated on weekdays from 7:15 am to 7:45 pm, with service on the hour to JFK, then back to the Manhattan heliports at half past the hour. The company also offered chartered service to popular locations including the Hamptons, Washington, D.C., Mohegan Sun, Foxwoods and Atlantic City. Working with the air traffic control and FAA, the helicopters operated on specially dedicated flight paths between the heliports and airports. The fleet consisted of three 8-seat Sikorsky S-76 dual-engine helicopters with first-class executive leather interiors, each operated by two pilots. US Helicopter was the only scheduled helicopter airline service in the United States certified by both the United States Department of Transportation and the Federal Aviation Administration.

The company offered seasonal service to East Hampton, New York and Belmar, New Jersey. East Hampton flights took 35 minutes and Belmar flights took 18 minutes. These flights cost $799 and $326, respectively, and operated annually from June to September.

Each heliport was equipped with a VIP lounge/waiting area, as well as TSA screening capability. They had roomy leather chairs, large TVs, and Bloomberg Terminals. Passengers traveling via Delta Air Lines and Continental Airlines were checked in at the heliport and could obtain boarding passes and baggage receipts to their final destination. These passengers remained in secure areas, eliminating the need to go through airport security again at the airport. Passengers traveling with other airlines could connect to the appropriate terminal to complete the check-in process and proceed through security to their flight gate.

== History ==
The company started its service in March 2006. Service to the East 34th Street Heliport was added in September 2006 and to Newark Liberty International Airport in November 2006. Flights from Newark used to operate from a secured area at Gate 71 in Continental Airlines' Terminal C.

The company had severe financial difficulties in 2009 and had to borrow operating funds at high interest rates. On 25 September 2009, US Helicopter suddenly shut down. The next month, the company filed an 8-K form stating that it no longer had resources to continue to file Securities and Exchange Commission reports or prepare financial statements. The airline never operated again.

== Airports served ==
- Downtown Manhattan Heliport (Downtown Manhattan)
- East 34th Street Heliport (Midtown Manhattan)
- John F. Kennedy International Airport, Terminal 3, Gate 11 (Queens)
- Newark Liberty International Airport, Continental Airlines Terminal C, Gate 71 (Newark, New Jersey)
- Sikorsky Memorial Airport (Bridgeport, Connecticut)
- East Hampton Airport (East Hampton, New York) (seasonal)
- Monmouth Executive Airport (Belmar, New Jersey) (seasonal)

== Fleet ==
- 3 Sikorsky S-76B
- 0 Sikorsky S-76C (order canceled due to bankruptcy)

== See also ==
- List of defunct airlines of the United States
- New York Airways, the first helicopter airline to serve Manhattan; now defunct
