= New York Helicopter =

Transportation company based in New York City, 1980–1988

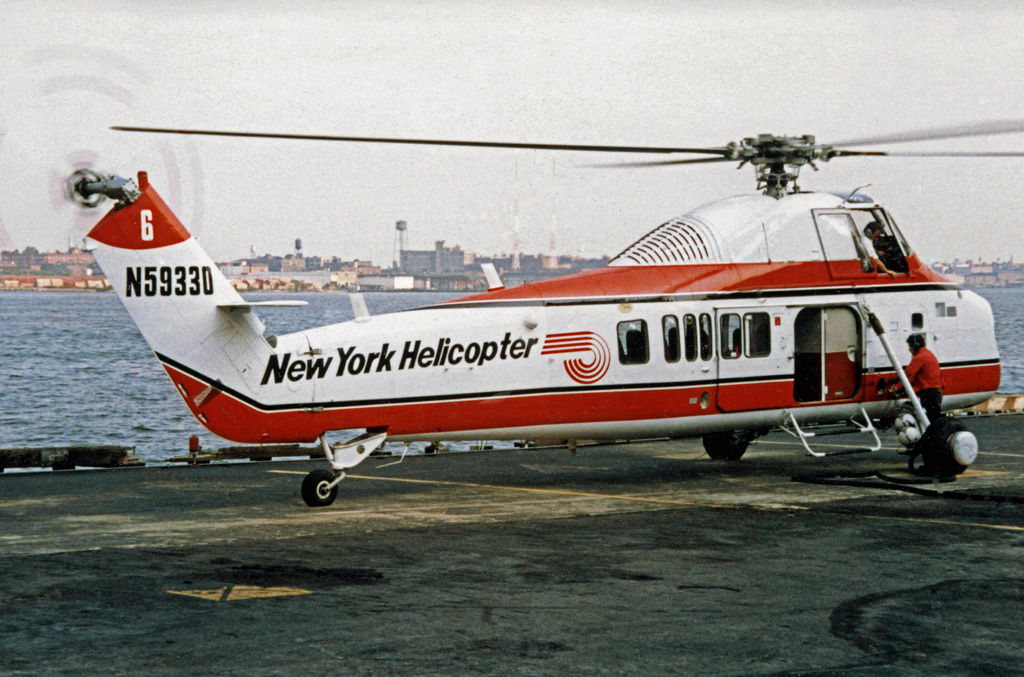
IATA	ICAO	Call sign
NYH	—	—
- Founded: July 1980; 46 years ago
- Ceased operations: April 15, 1988; 38 years ago
- Fleet size: 11
- Parent company: Island Helicopters
- Headquarters: East 34th Street Heliport
- Key people: Reed Phillips (CEO)

New York Helicopter was an American helicopter transportation company, formed in July 1980 and fully owned and operated as a subsidiary of Island Helicopter Corporation. It provided scheduled service from Manhattan's East 34th Street Heliport on the East River and the three major metro New York airports: Kennedy, LaGuardia, and Newark. The company also provided sightseeing and private charter operations.

An unrelated sightseeing company named New York Helicopter (also known as New York Helicopter Tours and New York Helicopter Charter) began in the 1990s and was still operating in 2025. In 1984, Island Helicopters, parent company of New York Helicopter, filed for Chapter 11 bankruptcy protection.

== Fleet ==
The original 1980–1988 company operated:

- two Sikorsky S-58s
- two Aérospatiale AS 350s
- seven Aérospatiale SA 360s

== See also ==
- List of defunct airlines of the United States
