= Downtown Manhattan Heliport =

Heliport in New York City

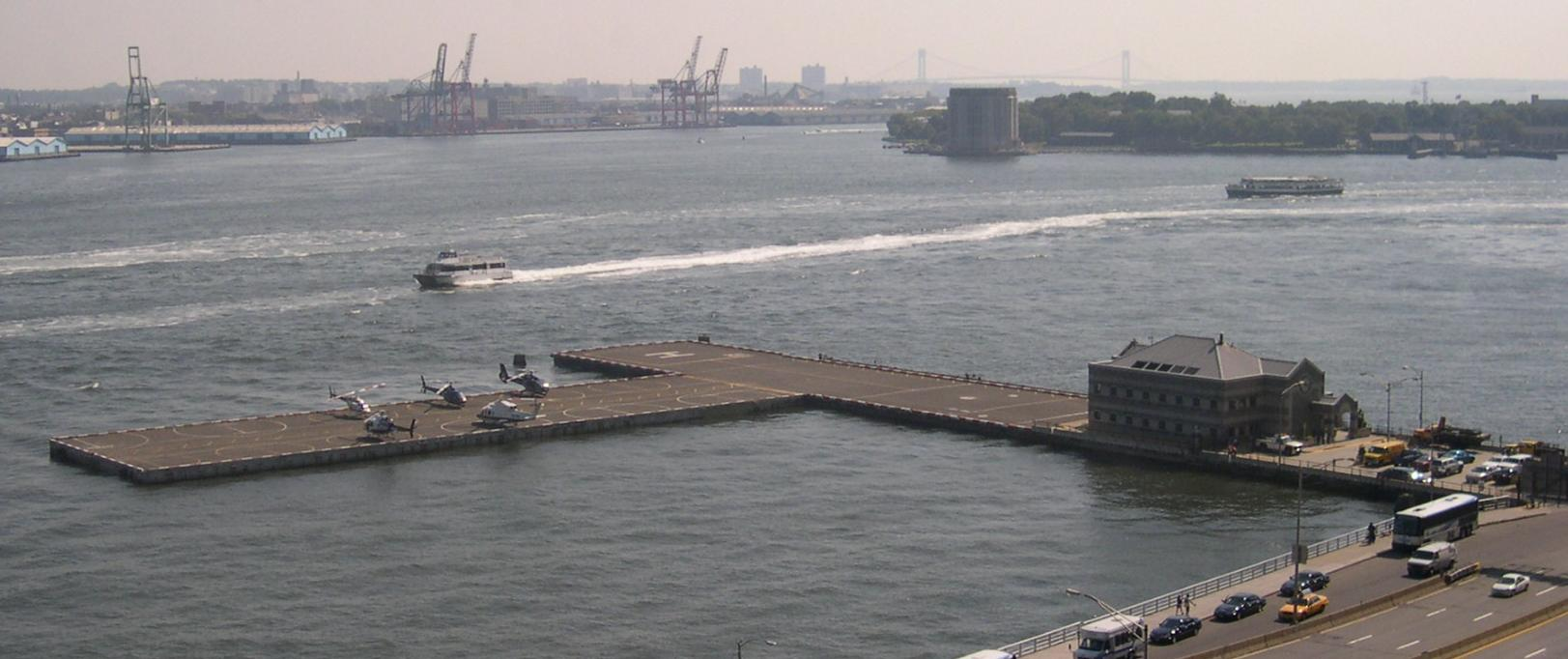
- IATA: JRB; ICAO: KJRB; FAA LID: JRB

Summary
- Airport type: Public
- Owner: NYCEDC
- Operator: Downtown Skyport LLC
- Serves: New York City
- Opened: December 8, 1960
- Elevation AMSL: 7 ft (2.1 m)
- Coordinates: 40.701116°N 74.008801°W
- Website: www.downtownskyportnyc.com

Map
- Interactive map of Downtown Manhattan Heliport

Helipads
Number	Length		Surface
Number	ft	m	Surface
H1	62	19	Concrete

Statistics (2003)
- Aircraft operations: 10,002
- Source: FAA and official site

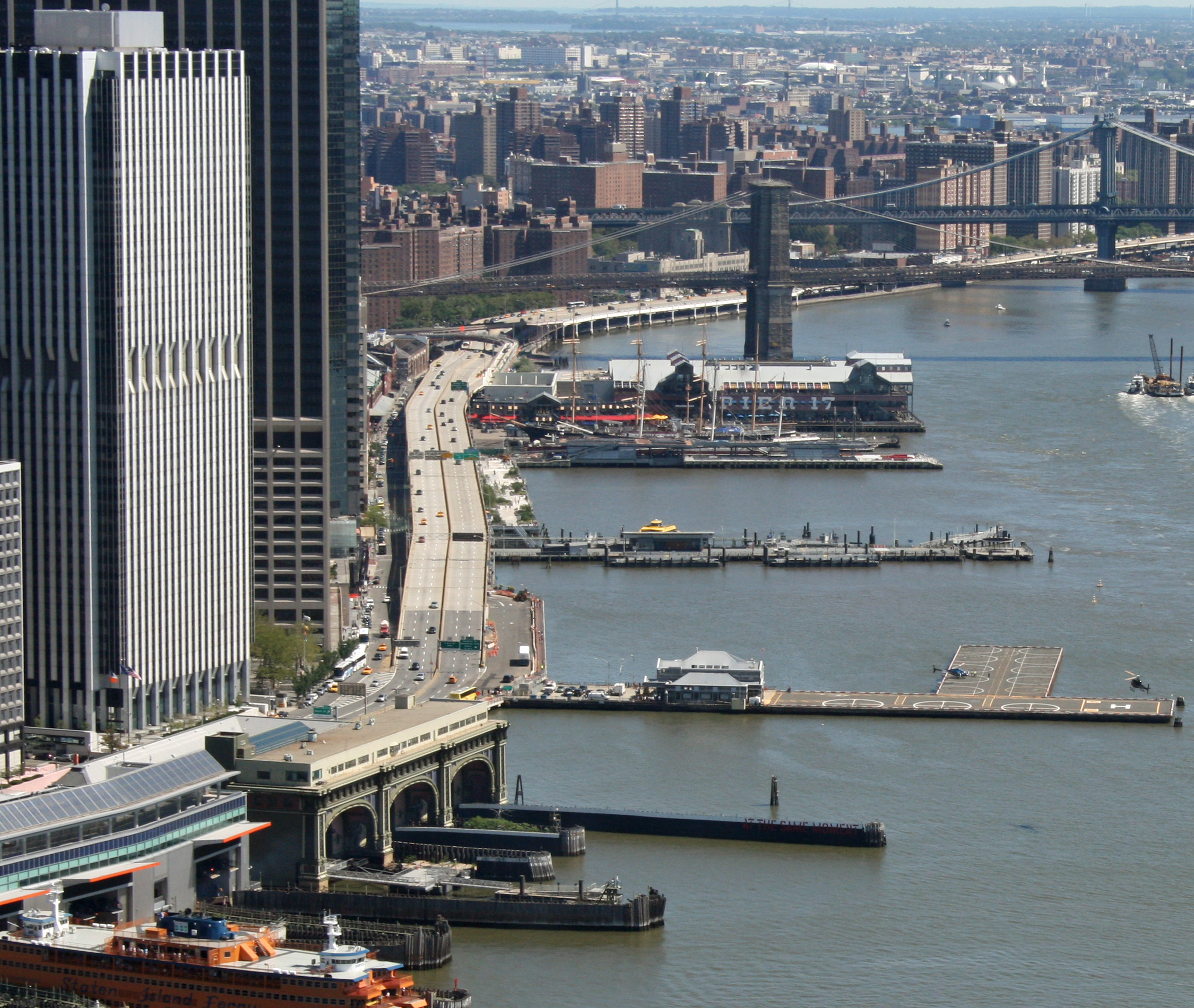
Downtown Manhattan Heliport at Pier 6 in the East River

The Downtown Manhattan Heliport (IATA: JRB, ICAO: KJRB, FAA LID: JRB) (Downtown Manhattan/Wall St. Heliport) is a helicopter landing platform at Pier 6, on the East River, in the Financial District of Lower Manhattan in New York City. The heliport was renamed to Downtown Skyport in April 2025.

The heliport was built by the Port of New York Authority in 1960 on a pier formerly used as a general cargo terminal and was reconstructed from 1983 to 1987. The Port Authority operated the facility until 2008, after which operation of the city-owned heliport was taken over by Saker Aviation. It was the first heliport in the United States to receive Federal Aviation Administration certification for scheduled passenger helicopter service, the first public heliport with a semi-automatic fire protection foam system, and the first heliport to use a barge for aircraft parking. It is currently the only heliport in New York City that accommodates sightseeing flights.

== History ==
=== Opening and early years ===
In the mid-1950s, the Port of New York Authority (PA) prepared a transportation master plan that proposed the development of six new heliports in the metropolitan area, including one at the southern tip of Manhattan near The Battery or Wall Street. The PA opened the West 30th Street Heliport in 1956 (one of the locations identified in the master plan) and New York Airways began operating helicopter shuttle service between that heliport and area airports, but passenger demand was much lower than projected and thought to be a result of competition by other forms of ground transportation. It was believed that a helicopter landing pad in Lower Manhattan would attract more passenger demand, which led to the PA to study the feasibility of a new heliport. The Downtown-Lower Manhattan Association also recommended the establishment of a heliport as part of the redevelopment of old piers on the East River and the New York City Marine and Aviation Department allocated space along the waterfront to the development of a heliport by the PA.

Plans for the new heliport and a 37-year lease of the site to the PA were approved by the New York City Board of Estimate on May 27, 1960. Built by the PA at a cost of $230,000, the original facility included an 80-by-85-foot (24 by 26 m) helicopter landing pad, a 300-by-85-foot (91 by 26 m) parking and loading area for helicopters, a one-story terminal building, and parking lot for autos. The Downtown Manhattan Heliport opened on December 8, 1960.

The same day the new heliport opened, New York Airways began operating flights to LaGuardia Airport (LGA), Newark Airport (EWR) and New York International Airport (JFK). Scheduled service to the airports was temporarily suspended in December 1969 due to the high costs of operating Boeing Vertol 107s and resumed in May 1971 with the introduction of Sikorsky S-61s to the airline's fleet; service to Morristown Airport in New Jersey was also added at this time. New York Airways' helicopter service at the Wall Street Heliport was suspended in February 1977 with the reopening of the heliport on the roof of the Pan Am Building. The airline stopped operating in Manhattan after an accident atop the Pan Am Building in May 1977 resulted in five deaths. The airline did not return to the Wall Street Heliport because the vertical takeoffs required by the landing pad's configuration reduced the loads that could be carried by helicopters and they could not carry enough passengers to break even. When the airline resumed operations in Lower Manhattan in April 1978, it did so at a temporary heliport built on landfill in Battery Park City.

In April 1971, Island Helicopters, Inc. began providing scheduled commuter service between the Wall Street Heliport and Roosevelt Field Industrial Park on Long Island. The flights operated for three years until service was suspended in April 1974.

The original heliport was constructed on a wooden pier originally built in 1888 as a general cargo terminal, and by the late 1970s and early 1980s deterioration of the piles supporting the structure led to segments of the pier being forced out and portions of the helicopter parking area to be closed off. A visit by United States president Jimmy Carter in November 1978 was diverted from the Wall Street Heliport to the West 30th Street Heliport due to safety concerns by the Secret Service. The Wall Street Heliport was eventually closed due to structural issues on September 16, 1983 and flights were diverted to a temporary heliport that had been used by the PA on landfill in Battery Park City.

=== Reconstruction ===
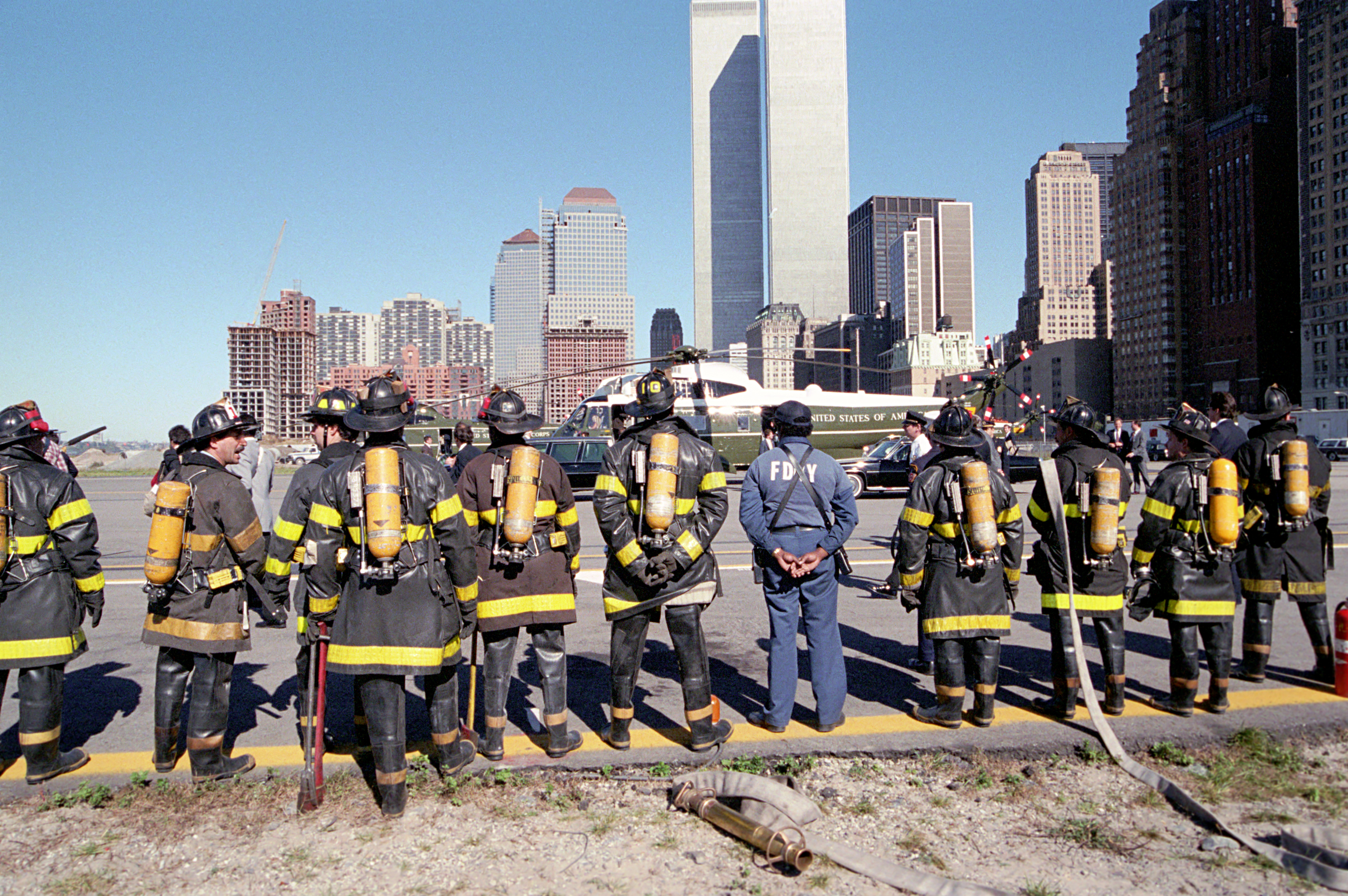
A landing pad in Battery Park City was used by aircraft during reconstruction, including Marine One in 1985.

The cost of reconstructing the heliport was estimated to be nearly $7 million. Coincidentally, in 1983 the Federal Aviation Administration (FAA) launched its National Prototype Heliport Demonstration and Development Program, a project to illustrate the usefulness and viability of developing full-service heliports in the United States for eventual all-weather operations. The Wall Street Heliport, which was renamed the Downtown Manhattan Heliport, was one of four heliports selected by the FAA to be part of the program. The old pier was demolished and replaced by a new concrete structure. Although the PA's lease with the city covered an area of approximately 8 acres (3.2 ha) and allowed for significant expansion of the heliport's operational area, the replacement pier was built to the same dimensions as the old pier and a barge was added to provide parking for helicopters (considered to be an anchored floating structure), which avoided the need for the preparation of a lengthy environmental assessment.

As part of the project, tests were made using a Microwave Landing System (MLS) at the Battery Park City Heliport and at a pier near Wall Street. Plans to install a permanent MLS were abandoned when the site in Red Hook, Brooklyn on which the transmitter was to be located was put up for sale by the PA. A semi-automatic fire protection foam system was installed that provided full coverage of the pier and could be remotely operated from the terminal; it was the first public heliport to include such a system. The PA entered into a new 20-year lease with the city for the heliport site on March 1, 1986. The diversion of flights to the Battery Park City Heliport concluded in September 1987 and the reconstructed Downtown Manhattan Heliport was dedicated on October 27, 1987. The overall cost of the reconstruction project was $13 million, of which $6 million was paid for by the federal government as part of the FAA's National Prototype Heliport Demonstration and Development Program and $3 million was spent by the PA to ensure that the new heliport would be completed in time before the lease of the temporary heliport at Battery Park City ran out.

After the new facility opened, the PA experienced a problem with seagulls dropping clams onto the heliport to break open the shells and feared that the birds could get caught in helicopter rotors and bring aircraft down or the contents of the clam shells on surfaces could cause helicopters' landing gear to skid or passengers to slip and fall. To address the issue, the PA employed a technique that had been successfully used by the United States Coast Guard at Floyd Bennett Field in Brooklyn, using stencils to paint patterns of flying seagulls on the surface to keep the birds away.

From December 1989 to March 1990, Trump Air provided scheduled service to LGA using Sikorsky S-61s to provide connections for passengers on Trump Shuttle flights. In 1990, the Downtown Manhattan Heliport became the first heliport in the United States to receive FAA certification under Federal Aviation Regulations Part 139 for scheduled passenger helicopter service.

National Helicopter Corp. started operating sightseeing flights at the heliport in 1997 after the company had been evicted from the city-owned East 34th Street Heliport over unpaid rent. This move was estimated to add about 50 daily takeoffs and landings on weekdays to the Downtown Manhattan Heliport. The PA was unable to restrict National Helicopter Corp. from using the facility since federal funds had been used to build the heliport and for this same reason sightseeing flights could not be banned until 2008.

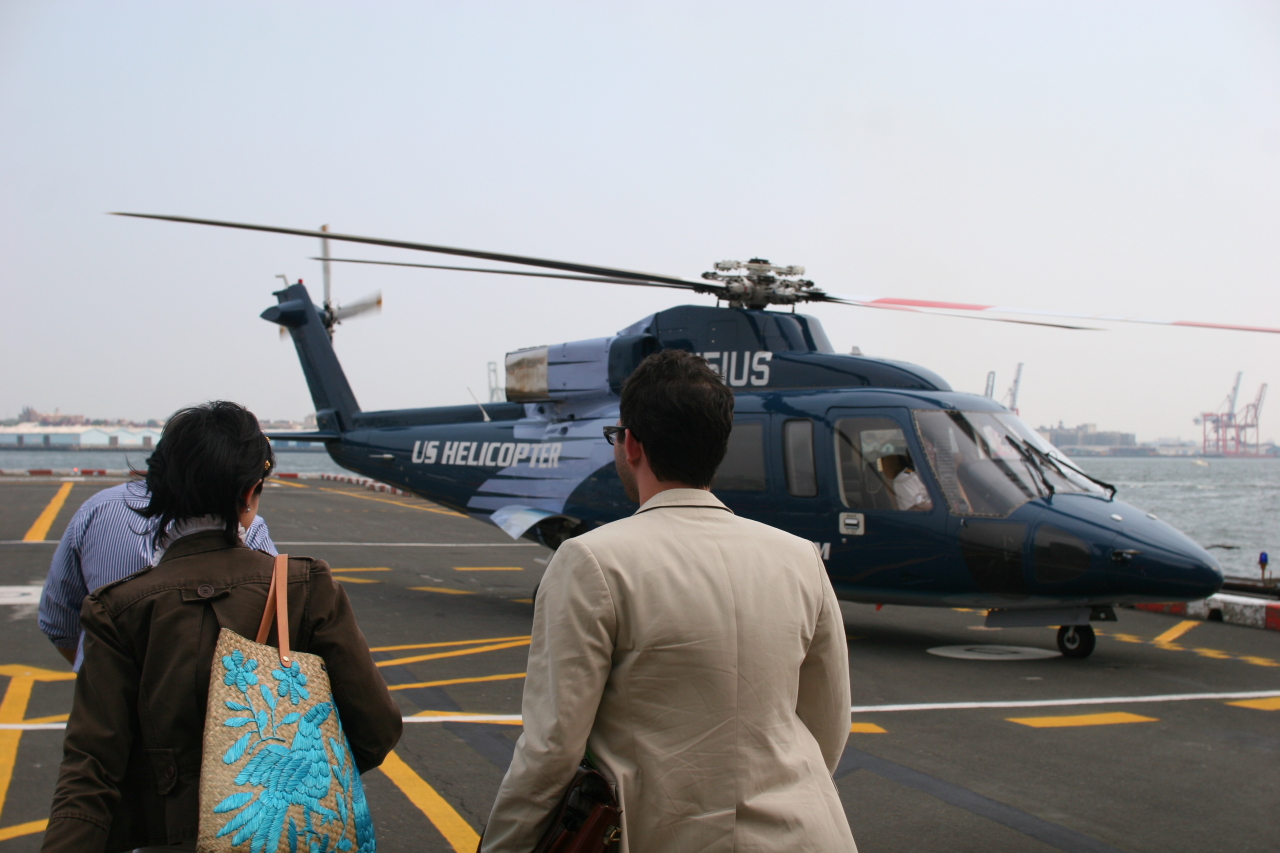
Passengers boarding a US Helicopter flight to JFK Airport in 2006

In March 2006, US Helicopter resumed scheduled passenger service to airports with hourly flights to JFK. Service to EWR was added in December 2006. With the addition of a Transportation Security Administration (TSA) checkpoint, passengers checked baggage and underwent security screening at the heliport and disembarked at the airside zone of the terminals of partner airlines, bypassing the need to check luggage or go through security at the airport if their flight was departing from the same terminal. The Downtown Manhattan Heliport was the first heliport in the United States to be "federalized" by the TSA. The flights operated until September 2009 when US Helicopter ceased all service due to financial difficulties.

=== Change to private operator ===
The PA's lease on the heliport site expired in August 2007 and was not renewed. The agency continued to operate the facility while the city sought out a new operator for the facility. Prior to the selection of a new fixed-base operator for the heliport, the city performed noise studies to determine how much new traffic the facility could handle, accommodating flights diverted from the West 30th Street Heliport. The new operator was also required to implement a refueling system available for helicopters using the facility; previously the heliport did not have any fuel services.

City officials selected FirstFlight to take over operations at the Downtown Manhattan Heliport and the company began operating the facility on November 1, 2008. The change in the heliport's operator resulted in a five-month suspension of US Helicopter's scheduled flights from the Downtown Manhattan Heliport to EWR and JFK because FirstFlight did obtain approval from TSA for a passenger security screening plan and then demanded higher rent from US Helicopter after a security plan was approved. US Helicopter service resumed in March 2009 after city officials helped to negotiate an agreement between FirstFlight and US Helicopter. FirstFlight subsequently changed its name to Saker Aviation.

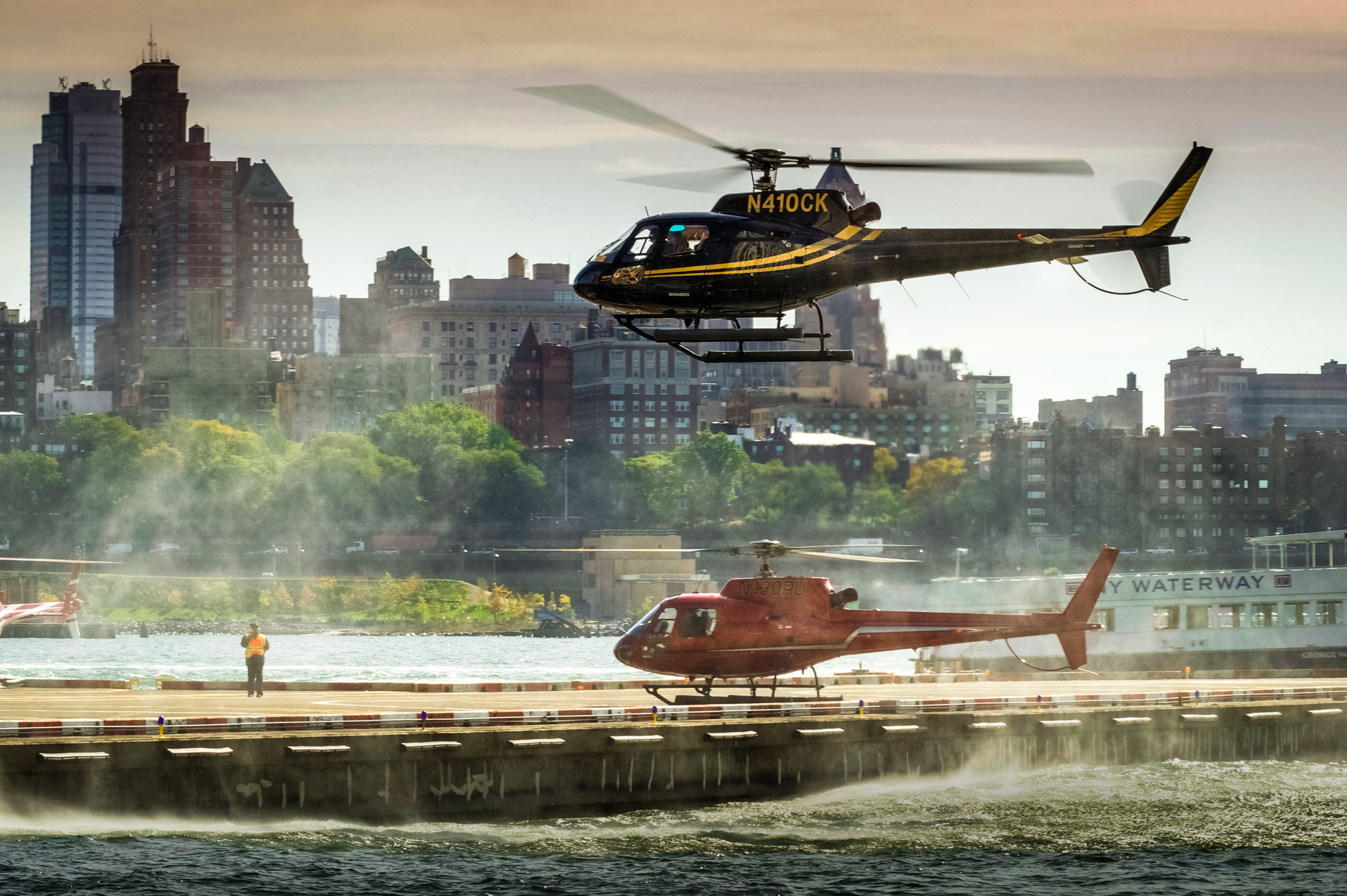
Flight operations at the heliport in 2014

When sightseeing flights were banned from the West 30th Street Heliport on April 1, 2010, the Downtown Manhattan Heliport was left as the only heliport in New York City that could accommodate sightseeing flights. In 2010, the downtown heliport handled at total of 43,386 flights, of which 41,540 were sightseeing-related. Sightseeing flights that had been operating from the West 30th Street Heliport shifted to the Downtown Manhattan Heliport, which prompted complaints about the noise and pollution generated by tourist flights from residents in Manhattan and Brooklyn, visitors to the Brooklyn Bridge Park, and students attending school on Governors Island, with some groups calling for a complete ban on all tourist flights. Traffic at the Downtown Manhattan Heliport increased to 58,021 total flights in 2014; the New York City Economic Development Corporation (NYCEDC) estimated that over 56,000 of these were sightseeing trips.

In February 2016, an agreement between the city and helicopter tour operators was reached to cut the number of sightseeing flights in half by January 1, 2017 (compared to 2015 baseline levels), restrict sightseeing flights to a maximum of 300 a day on Saturdays, and eliminate all sightseeing flights on Sundays. As a result of the agreement, the Downtown Manhattan Heliport is now capped at accommodating a maximum of 29,651 tourist flights per year.

To protect Lower Manhattan from future flooding associated with coastal storms and projected sea level rise, NYCEDC and the Mayor's Office of Climate Resiliency commissioned the preparation of a master plan for climate resilience in the Financial District and Seaport areas. The plan was released in 2021 and included strategies to rebuild the East River waterfront from The Battery to the Brooklyn Bridge such as the addition of a floodwall. The master plan projected that the existing deck of the Downtown Manhattan Heliport would be flooded on a monthly basis by the 2050s and proposed for a replacement heliport to be built at a higher elevation near its existing site with access to the pier for emergency and service vehicles provided via a flood gate.

In November 2023, the Downtown Manhattan Heliport was the site of the first piloted demonstration flights of electric vertical take-off and landing (eVTOL) aircraft from an urban heliport, which were operated by Joby Aviation and Volocopter. That same month, NYCEDC issued a request for proposal (RFP) seeking a heliport operator which would be encouraged to incentivize the use of eVTOLs after FAA certification of this type of aircraft and develop a plan to install the infrastructure needed to accommodate eVTOLs. The RFP also included a requirement to support the development of a marine micro-distribution facility at the site, which would receive waterborne freight deliveries and facilitate last-mile deliveries by greener forms of transportation, such as cargo bikes. In November 2024, NYCEDC announced that Downtown Skyport LLC, a joint venture between Skyports Infrastructure (operator of the London Heliport) and Groupe ADP, was the winner of the RFP. The new contract was anticipated to take effect in February 2025. Downtown Skyport LLC took over operation of the heliport in April 2025, which was also renamed as the "Downtown Skyport".

== Operations ==
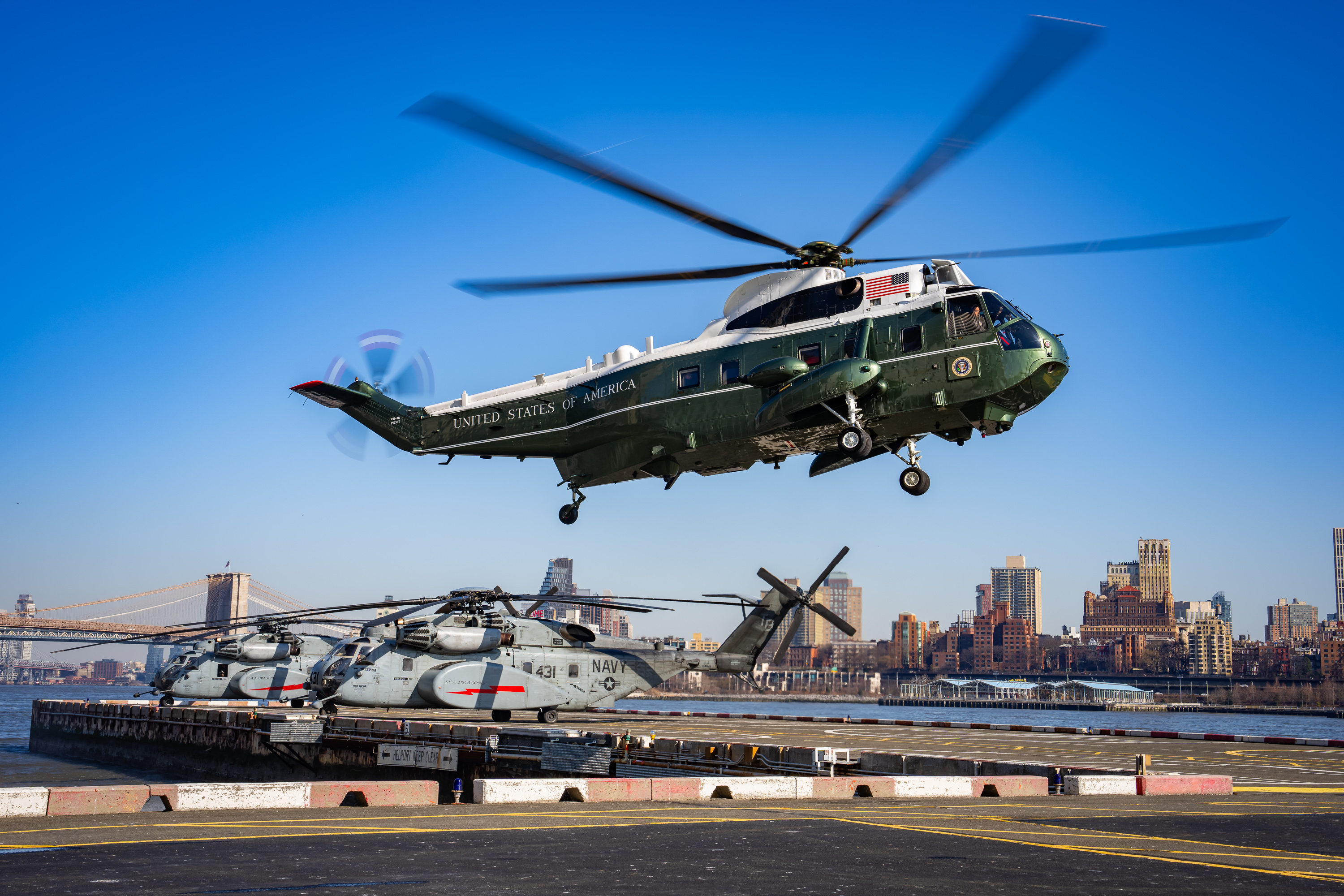
Marine One landing at the heliport in 2024

Much of the heliport's traffic is generated by Wall Street and the lower Manhattan financial district; top business executives and time-sensitive document deliveries often use the heliport. The heliport is the normal landing spot for the President of the United States on visits to New York. Former New York City Mayor Michael Bloomberg frequently used the heliport to fly between Bloomberg L.P. headquarters and Johns Hopkins University when he was chairman of both institutions.

In the year ending December 30, 2003, the airport had 10,002 aircraft operations, an average of 27 per day: 90% general aviation and 10% military.

== Facilities ==
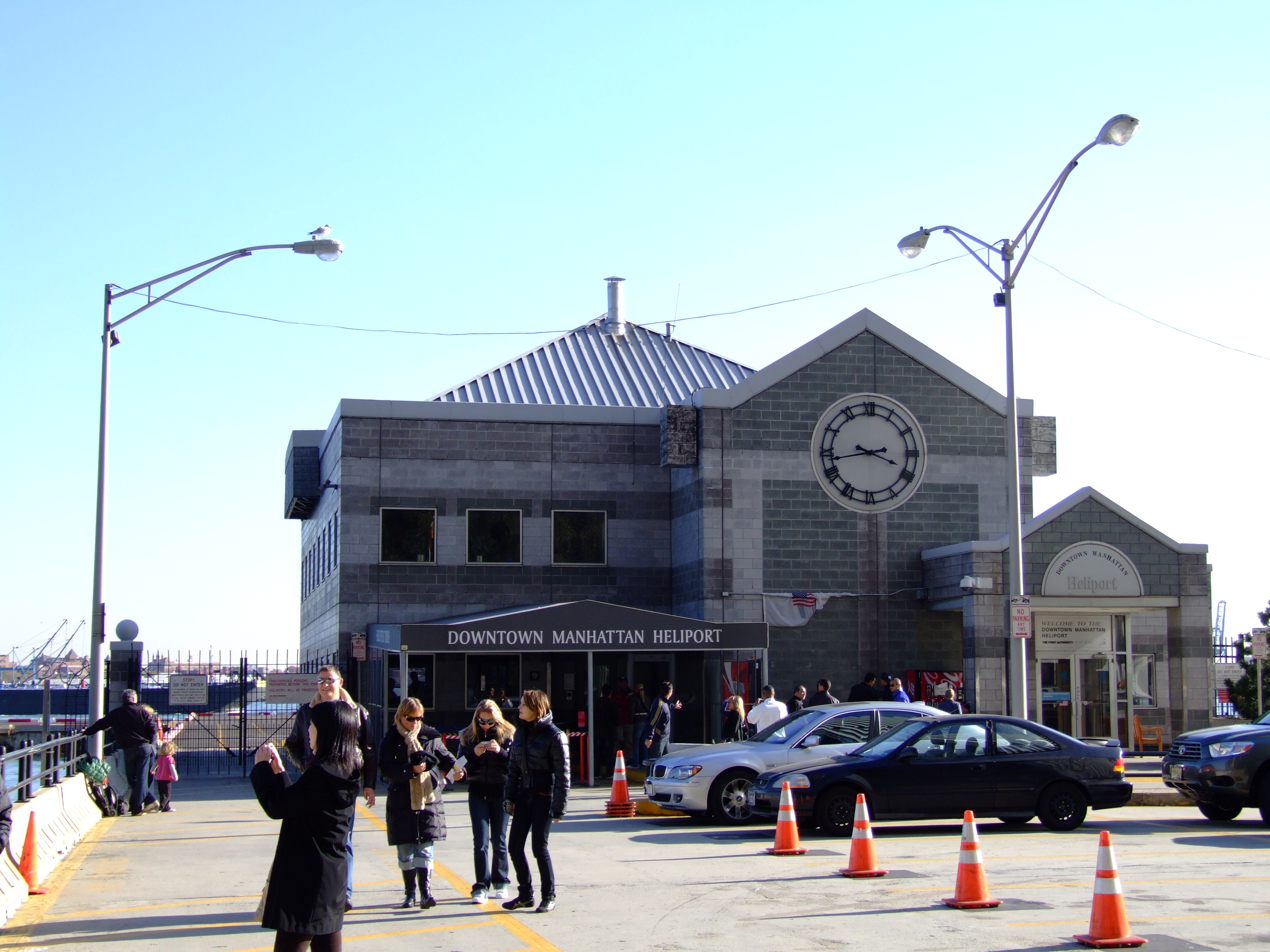
The terminal building and auto parking lot in 2008

The heliport covers 2 acres (0.81 ha) at an elevation of 7 feet (2.1 m). It has one helipad, H1, 62 ft × 62 ft (19 m × 19 m) concrete that can accommodate aircraft weighing up to 50,000 pounds (22,680 kg).

The heliport's facilities are located on a 550-by-85-foot (168 by 26 m) concrete pier and a 300-by-90-foot (91 by 27 m) barge, the Alice G. Neumann, which is anchored perpendicularly to the north side of the pier. The helipad is located at the far end of the pier, which also contains a parking lot for autos and a 6,300-square-foot (590 m^{2}), two-story soundproof concrete terminal building that includes a waiting room and pilot's lounge, with administrative offices and a flight observation deck located on the second floor.

A total of 13 helicopter parking spaces are currently provided at the heliport, 10 of which are located on the barge and 3 of which are located on the pier. While the helipad at the end of the pier serves as the designated Touch-down and Lift-off (TLOF) area, the 13 spaces on the barge and pier are also used as hybrid takeoff/landing and parking spots. The spots on the pier can accommodate a maximum helicopter rotor blade diameter of 45 feet (14 m) and the spots on the barge can accommodate a maximum rotor blade diameter of 44 feet (13 m), except for one spot that is designed for a maximum rotor blade diameter of 36 feet (11 m). The Downtown Manhattan Heliport was the first heliport to use a barge for aircraft parking.

== Accidents and incidents ==
- On June 14, 2005, a Bell 206 Long Ranger on a sightseeing flight crashed into the East River shortly after takeoff. The pilot and six passengers, one of which was critically injured, were rescued by police boats. The National Transportation Safety Board determined the probable cause of the accident was a result of "the pilot's inadequate preflight planning, which resulted in an attempted takeoff with an overweight helicopter."
- On December 13, 2021, a Bell 429 operated by the New York Police Department experienced ground resonance while landing and the pilot slammed the aircraft into the ground to avoid hitting other people and another helicopter in the vicinity of the landing pad. The helicopter was substantially damaged and the co-pilot was injured.

== See also ==
- Aviation in the New York metropolitan area
- List of airports in New York
