= West 30th Street Heliport =

Heliport in Manhattan, New York

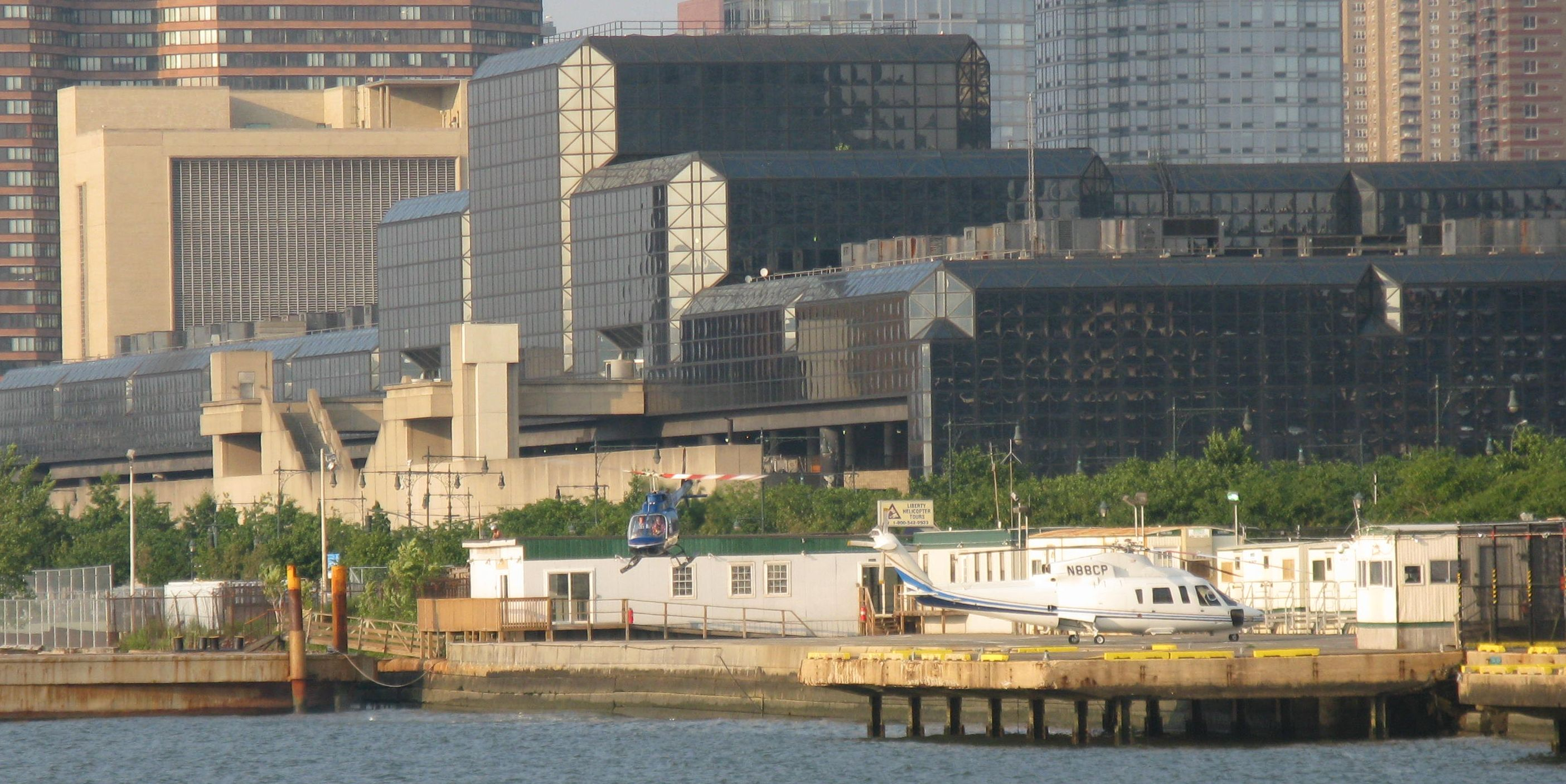
- IATA: JRA; ICAO: KJRA; FAA LID: JRA

Summary
- Airport type: Public
- Owner: Hudson River Park Trust
- Operator: Air Pegasus
- Serves: New York City
- Location: New York City
- Opened: September 26, 1956
- Elevation AMSL: 7 ft (2.1 m)
- Coordinates: 40.754626°N 74.006808°W
- Website: westsideheliport.com

Map
- Interactive map of West 30th Street Heliport

Helipads
| Number | Length | | Surface |
| Number | ft | m | Surface |
|---|---|---|---|
| 1 | 44 | 13.4 | Asphalt |
| 2 | 44 | 13.4 | Asphalt |
| 3 | 44 | 13.4 | Asphalt |
| 4 | 44 | 13.4 | Asphalt |
| 5 | 37 | 11.3 | Asphalt |
| 6 | 37 | 11.3 | Asphalt |
| 8 (H-A) | 44 | 13.4 | Asphalt |
| 9 (H-B) | 44 | 13.4 | Asphalt |
| 10 (H-C) | 37 | 11.3 | Asphalt |
| 11 (H-D) | 37 | 11.3 | Asphalt |
- Source: Airnav

The West 30th Street Heliport, also known as the Westside Heliport (IATA: JRA, ICAO: KJRA, FAA LID: JRA), is a heliport on the West Side of Manhattan in New York City. Originally constructed by the Port of New York Authority (PA) in 1956, the facility has been operated by Air Pegasus since 1981. The heliport currently operates under a lease agreement with the Hudson River Park Trust.

== History ==
=== Planning and development ===
In November 1953, New York City Marine and Aviation Department commissioner Edward F. Cavanagh Jr. proposed the development of a helicopter landing area serving Midtown Manhattan along the Hudson River waterfront to New York Airways and the Port of New York Authority (PA). The heliport was to be situated on barges tied up to piers at a point between 33rd and 37th streets. Although the specific location of the heliport was not identified, a landing pad in this area would provide convenient access for the delivery of mail carried by helicopters to and from the General Post Office (located on Eighth Avenue between 31st and 33rd streets) and would also allow for helicopter landings and take-offs to occur over open water. At that time, New York Airways was operating helicopters transporting mail and passengers between the airports serving the area. The proposed heliport would require PA approval because of a 1947 pact between the city and the PA related to the development of new airport facilities.

The following month, New York City Mayor-elect Robert F. Wagner Jr. announced that he would appoint Cavanagh as the city's Fire Commissioner and Vincent A. G. O'Connor would be replacing him as the new commissioner of the city's Marine and Aviation Department. O'Connor included a proposed heliport on the Hudson River at 30th Street in his request for capital funds for 1955, but the helicopter landing pad was to be included as part of a new freight-forwarding terminal. O'Connor further outlined the city's plans for the heliport at a budget hearing in January 1955, mentioning that it would be built atop a terminal on a L-shaped pier that would be used to transfer cargo from railroad car floats to trucks. The terminal was estimated to cost $1,250,000 and an additional $150,000 to $250,000 would be required in order to strengthen its roof to accommodate helicopter take-offs and landings.

Both New York Airways and the PA advised O'Connor that the plan for a rooftop heliport was not feasible. In August 1955, a letter from PA executive director Austin J. Tobin to O'Connor accused the city of needlessly delaying construction of a heliport and asked for immediate permission for the PA to construct a 100-by-400-foot (30 by 122 m) helicopter landing pad on the site at ground level, which was estimated to cost $50,000 and could be completed in 30 days. It was to be a temporary facility that could be used for about three to five years before enough data and experience were collected to design and build a permanent heliport, which was estimated to cost $5,000,000. The PA had made a similar proposal 18 months before as a result of the advancement of plans developed with Cavanagh, but never received approval and O'Connor had instead proposed a different plan for the site with the heliport on the roof of the freight terminal. The PA indicated that the rooftop heliport was infeasible from operational and economic standpoints, would cost $600,000 for the helicopter landing pad alone, and that the proposed freight-forwarding terminal could be instead constructed to the north of the proposed heliport site. O'Connor replied to Tobin's letter the next day and denied permission for the PA to build the proposed temporary heliport, citing safety concerns related to its close proximity to the West Side Elevated Highway.

In September 1954, the PA shared letters from Igor Sikorsky and Colonel William B. Bunker that both backed its proposed heliport design. Three months later, O'Connor shared a report by the consulting engineering firm of Frederic R. Harris Inc. that raised concerns over the safety of motorists driving adjacent to the proposed heliport—both on the elevated highway and on the roadway beneath it. In January 1956, the Civil Aeronautics Administration (CAA) sent its own specialists to New York City to study the two plans and ended up endorsing the PA's proposal for an at-grade heliport and rejecting the city's proposal for a rooftop heliport. After the CAA issued its findings, Mayor Wagner created a special committee to further study the two plans and issue a report to the Board of Estimate. The committee also endorsed the PA's plan for the proposed temporary heliport, finding that the development of helicopters had not yet advanced to a stage where it was practicable to make plans for a permanent helicopter facility, and also indicated that the heliport should include a landing pad extending into the river.

Plans for the heliport and a five-year lease of the city-owned site to the PA were approved by the Board of Estimate on June 28, 1956. Construction began on July 2, 1956. The facility was built on a 70-by-400-foot (21 by 122 m) section of bulkhead and included two helicopter landing pads, each 80 by 80 feet (24 by 24 m) in size, which extended 40 feet (12 m) into the water and were supported on steel piles driven into bedrock. A parking area for helicopters, two helicopter tie-down areas, and a passenger terminal were provided onshore. The PA agreed to restrict helicopters from operating over the West Side Highway during take-offs and landings and a screening fence was installed along the east side of the heliport adjacent to the highway.

=== Opening and early years ===
The heliport opened on September 26, 1956 with New York Airways operating Sikorsky S-55s outfitted with pontoons carrying mail and cargo to La Guardia and Newark airports. It was Manhattan's first commercial heliport. The first flights carrying passengers were delayed for a couple of weeks to allow helicopter pilots to better familiarize themselves with wind and operating conditions at the waterfront landing pad. On December 5, 1956, New York Airways began operating scheduled passenger flights between the West 30th Street Heliport and La Guardia and Newark airports using five-passenger Sikorsky S-55s. Service to and from New York International Airport was available via connecting helicopter flights at La Guardia Airport. Direct helicopter service to and from New York International Airport was added in August 1957, which coincided with the introduction of twelve-passenger Sikorsky S-58s equipped with floats. The S-58s were soon pulled from service at the waterfront heliport when their floats were found to cause excessive vibration and replaced back with S-55s. New York Airways began operating float-equipped, fifteen-passenger Vertol 44-Bs at the West 30th Street Heliport in June 1958.

When the heliport first opened, it was projected to accommodate 1,000,000 passengers a year by 1965 and 5,000,000 passengers a year by 1970. However, the actual passenger demand at the facility was much lower than projected, with only 11,990 annual passengers being handled by 1959, which was the first full year of operation of the larger capacity Vertol 44-Bs. The low passenger volumes were thought to be a result of competition by other forms of ground transportation (taxis and limousines) and scheduling issues related to unreliable equipment. It was believed that a new heliport in Manhattan's Financial District would attract more passenger demand, which led to the PA's development of the Downtown Manhattan Heliport, which opened on December 8, 1960. New York Airways had requested permission from the Civil Aeronautics Board (CAB) to temporarily transfer its operations from the West 30th Street Heliport to the Downtown Manhattan Heliport the day the new heliport opened because its fleet was not large enough to serve both heliports. Cutbacks in federal subsidies later forced New York Airways to end its service to Midtown Manhattan; the airline received approval from the CAB in December 1961 to suspend all operations at the West 30th Street Heliport, which at the time it was only using for mail and cargo services.

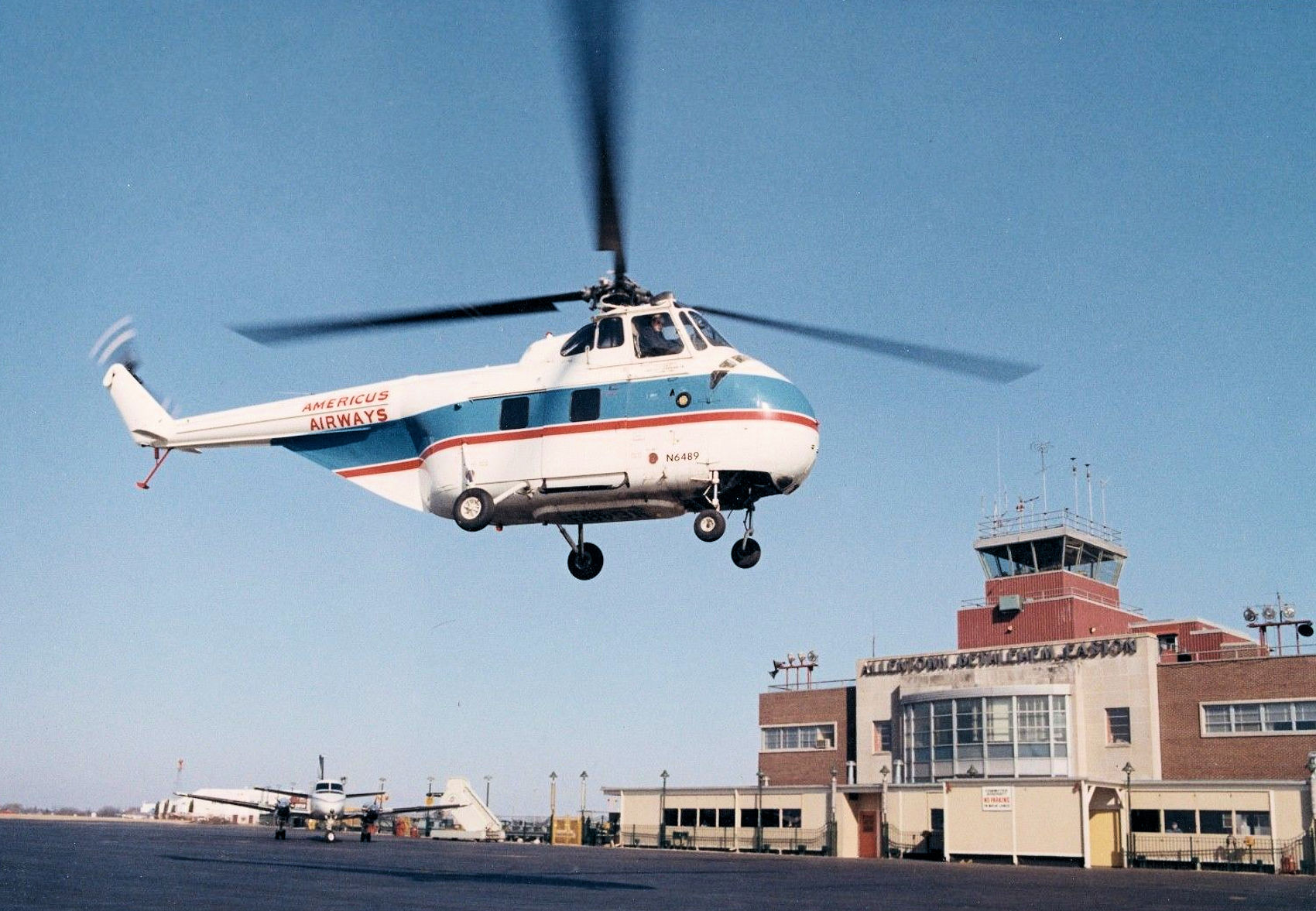
Americus Airways helicopter landing at Allentown, PA in 1969

In December 1969, Americus Airways began providing daily scheduled helicopter service between Allentown–Bethlehem–Easton Airport in Pennsylvania and the West 30th Street Heliport using Sikorsky S-55s. The airline was a subsidiary of Albert Moffa Enterprises, Inc. and headed by Albert Moffa, who owned the Americus Hotel in Allentown. Moffa had originally planned to operate the flights to New York City from the rooftop of the hotel. The flights were discontinued in November 1970 after the service failed to attract enough passengers to break even.

=== Later operation ===
The West 30th Street Heliport had 1,916 annual operations in 1980. The following year, the PA authorized Air Pegasus to serve as the private operator of the facility, which at the time was still being leased to the PA by the city. Air Pegasus added a lounge and communications equipment to the heliport to make it more attractive. While ownership of the site was subsequently transferred from New York City to New York State as part of the proposed development of the Westway, the lease of the heliport site to the PA was continued on a month-to-month basis. By 1983, helicopter traffic at the facility increased to 18,200 annual operations—primarily by business executives—and the landing pad was often referred to as the "VIP Heliport". Sightseeing flights were also offered from the heliport by Air Pegasus and Air Metro.

In September 1984, Resorts International Airline (RIA), a subsidiary of Resorts International, began providing scheduled passenger service between the West 30th Street Heliport and Atlantic City, New Jersey using a fleet of 24-passenger Sikorsky S-61s. RIA helicopters landed at the Steel Pier in Atlantic City, which was located a block away from the Resorts International Hotel-Casino. RIA was rebranded as Trump Air in 1988 after Donald Trump had acquired control of Resorts International by purchasing a controlling stake in the company. In addition to landing at the pier, helicopters also provided service to Bader Field in Atlantic City. In 1989, Trump Air expanded its operations by providing service on summer weekends to The Hamptons. Flights operated from West 30th Street to Suffolk County Airport in Westhampton Beach and East Hampton Airport. Trump Air ended its helicopter service to Atlantic City in 1991, citing financial difficulties and rising fuel costs following the Iraqi invasion of Kuwait.

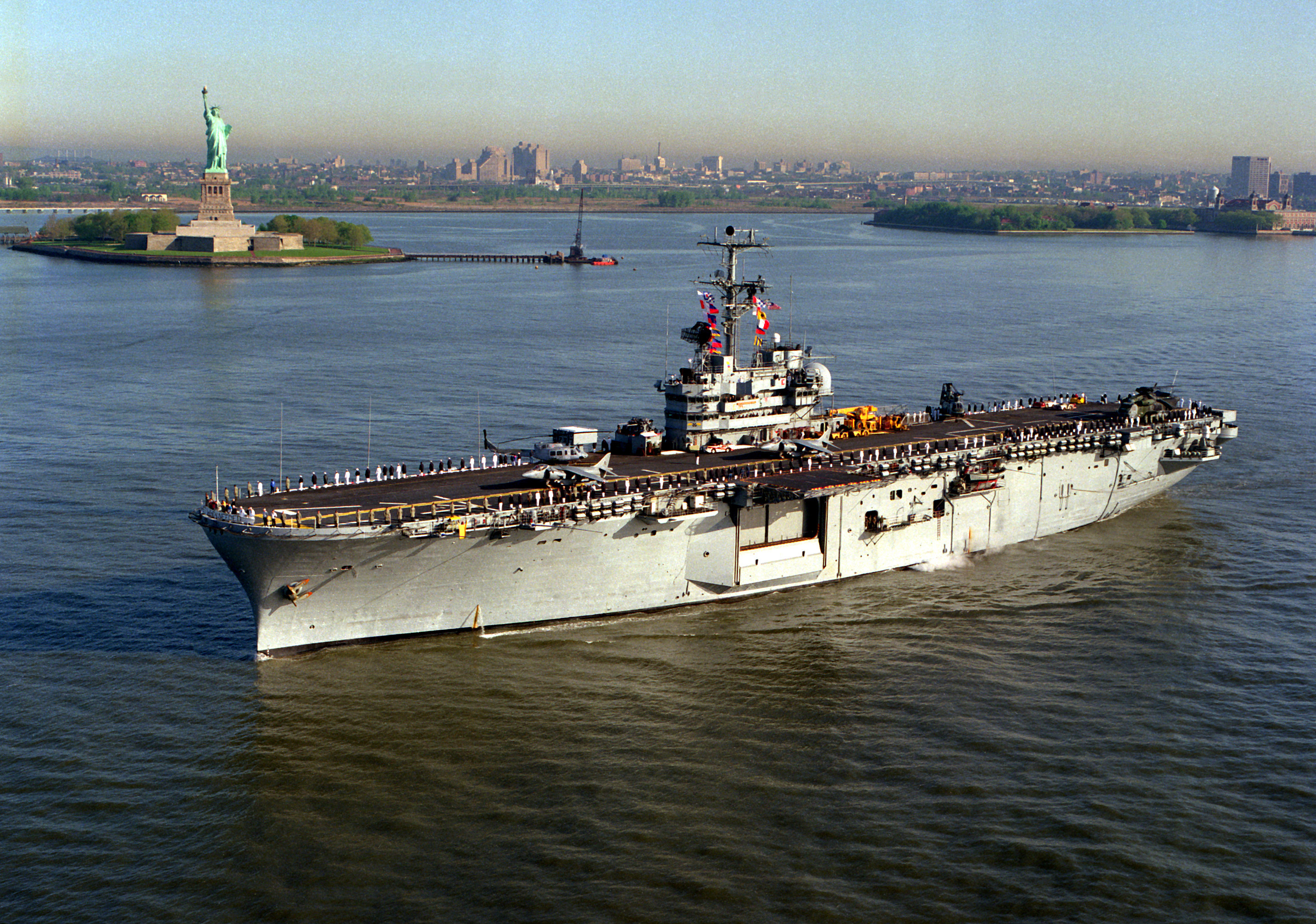
USS Guadalcanal was proposed as a floating heliport to replace the West 30th Street Heliport

In the mid-1990s, the Intrepid Sea, Air & Space Museum tried to acquire the decommissioned amphibious assault ship Guadalcanal, berth her next to Intrepid, and use Guadalcanal as a floating heliport to replace the West 30th Street Heliport. The plan was intended to expand the museum and increase its revenue while also freeing up space at the existing heliport site for the planned reconstruction of the West Side Highway and development of the Hudson River Park. The city had originally inquired about using Intrepid as a heliport, but the museum suggested the use of Guadalcanal as an alternative. The plan was abandoned after local residents objected that the ship would block their views of the Hudson River. The city then tried to relocate the heliport to Pier 76, replacing the car pound that occupied the pier at West 35th Street opposite the Javits Convention Center, and sought proposals for operators of a proposed 90,000-square-foot (8,400 m^{2}) helicopter landing pad at the site. At that time, more than half of the business at the heliport was coming from sightseeing flights.

Air Pegasus continued to serve as the heliport's operator, and oversight of the facility was taken over from the PA by the New York State Department of Transportation (NYSDOT). Air Pegasus entered into an agreement with NYSDOT in 1996 to operate the heliport that was set to expire in 2001. The oversight was subsequently assumed by the Hudson River Park Trust, a partnership between the state and city that was created by the Hudson River Park Act of 1998 to design, build, operate and maintain the Hudson River Park. The legislation permitted the operation of a heliport within the park for commercial and emergency uses, but not for tourism or recreational purposes. After the agreement with the Hudson River Park Trust expired, Air Pegasus continued operating the heliport on a month-to-month renewal of the lease.

Subsequent attempts were made to relocate the heliport in the following decade. In 2007, plans were drawn up by city and state officials to relocate the heliport two blocks to the north, to the former site of Pier 72. In 2008, a proposal was made by Air Pegasus, the operator of the facility, to temporarily relocate the heliport onto barges moored about 100 feet (30 m) offshore of the current site until a permanent location for the heliport could be identified. In the mid-2000s, the facility was averaging more than 45,000 helicopter operations each year. Air Pegasus has been a family-run business that originally was formed by Alvin Trenk to operate the heliport in 1981 and has since been run by Trenk and his daughter Abigail.

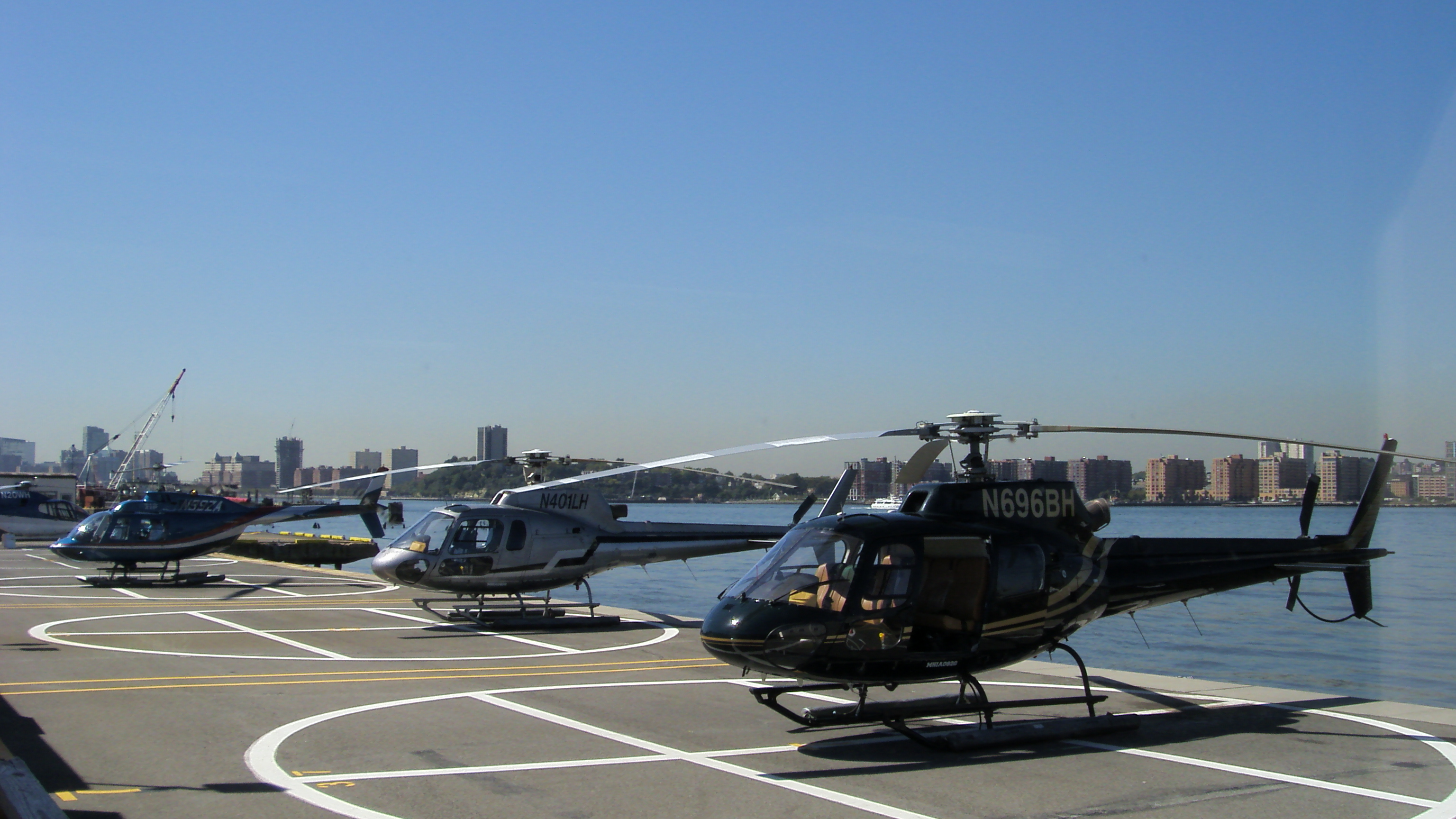
Helicopters parked at the West 30th Street Heliport in 2007

Tourist flights out of the 30th Street Heliport were scheduled to move to Downtown Manhattan Heliport on March 31, 2010, and the heliport itself was scheduled to relocate by December 31, 2012, as a result of a court agreement between helicopter operators and Friends of Hudson River Park, who took action to enforce the Hudson River Park Act, which banned tourism flights from that location. The facility had a total of 9,304 take-offs in 2011, the year after sightseeing flights were prohibited from the heliport. However, the deadline by which the heliport was to relocate was voided by state legislation in 2013, and the heliport remained open at its original site. The 2013 amendment to the Hudson River Park Act called for the heliport to be relocated to a site between West 29th and 32nd streets, with helicopter landing pads located on floating structures and the associated facilities located east of the bulkhead limited to a one-story terminal building, a fuel tank structure, and parking spaces. The amendment also allowed the heliport to operate at its existing site until the new landing pads located west of the bulkhead were completed.

Construction activities associated with the Gateway Program, which includes a new rail tunnel being built under the Hudson River, were projected to impact operations of the existing heliport site if it has not been relocated onto a floating structure prior to the start of construction. Construction activities related to ground improvement and tunneling for the Gateway Program were anticipated to require the closure of the existing heliport's fueling area, one or two helicopter landing pads, and the facility's driveway and parking area for a duration of approximately 1.5 years, as well as the possible rerouting of helicopter traffic to avoid conflicts between aircraft and tall construction equipment.

On April 27, 2026, the heliport served as the destination of the first point-to-point flight by an electric vertical take-off and landing (eVTOL) aircraft in New York City. The flight was operated by Joby Aviation and originated from John F. Kennedy International Airport, taking about 15 minutes to complete. The demonstration flight was hosted by the Port Authority of New York and New Jersey, which is participating in the Federal Aviation Administration's eVTOL Integration Pilot Program.

== Operations ==
KJRA has one published Instrument Procedures: COPTER RNAV (GPS) 210. Boating traffic in the Hudson River requires care in the approach to the heliport's landing pad.

== Airlines ==
| Airlines | Destinations |
|---|---|
| Blade | East Hampton, Montauk, New York–JFK, Newark, Southampton, Westhampton, White Plains |

== Statistics ==
Of the flights, 73% are air taxi, 16% general aviation, 10% commercial, and less than 1% military.

== Accidents and incidents ==
- On June 25, 1968, a Brantly 305 on a sightseeing flight crashed into the Hudson River shortly after takeoff from the West 30th Street Heliport. The pilot and all five passengers were rescued.
- On June 25, 1986, an Enstrom F-28-F crashed while attempting a landing in high wind conditions. The pilot and passenger escaped and swam away before the helicopter sank into the Hudson River.
- On December 31, 1997, an Aérospatiale AS-355 returning from a sightseeing flight crashed into a building at the West 30th Street Heliport. Eight people were injured in the accident.
- On July 7, 2007, a Eurocopter EC130 B4 returning to the West 30th Street Heliport from a sightseeing flight had an engine malfunction and made a controlled landing in the Hudson River, deploying its emergency pontoons. The pilot and seven passengers were rescued from private boats.
- On August 8, 2009, nine people were killed when a Liberty Helicopters sightseeing helicopter collided with a private plane shortly after takeoff from the West 30th Street Heliport. Both aircraft were operating on visual flight rules.
- On May 15, 2019, a Bell 206 crashed into the Hudson River on a short flight to move the helicopter from the fueling area to another part of the heliport. The pilot deployed its flotation equipment to prevent the helicopter from sinking and was rescued by a NY Waterway ferry.

== See also ==
- East 34th Street Heliport
- Aviation in the New York metropolitan area
- List of airports in New York
