= Aérospatiale SA 360 Dauphin =

French single-engine utility helicopter

SA 360 Dauphin
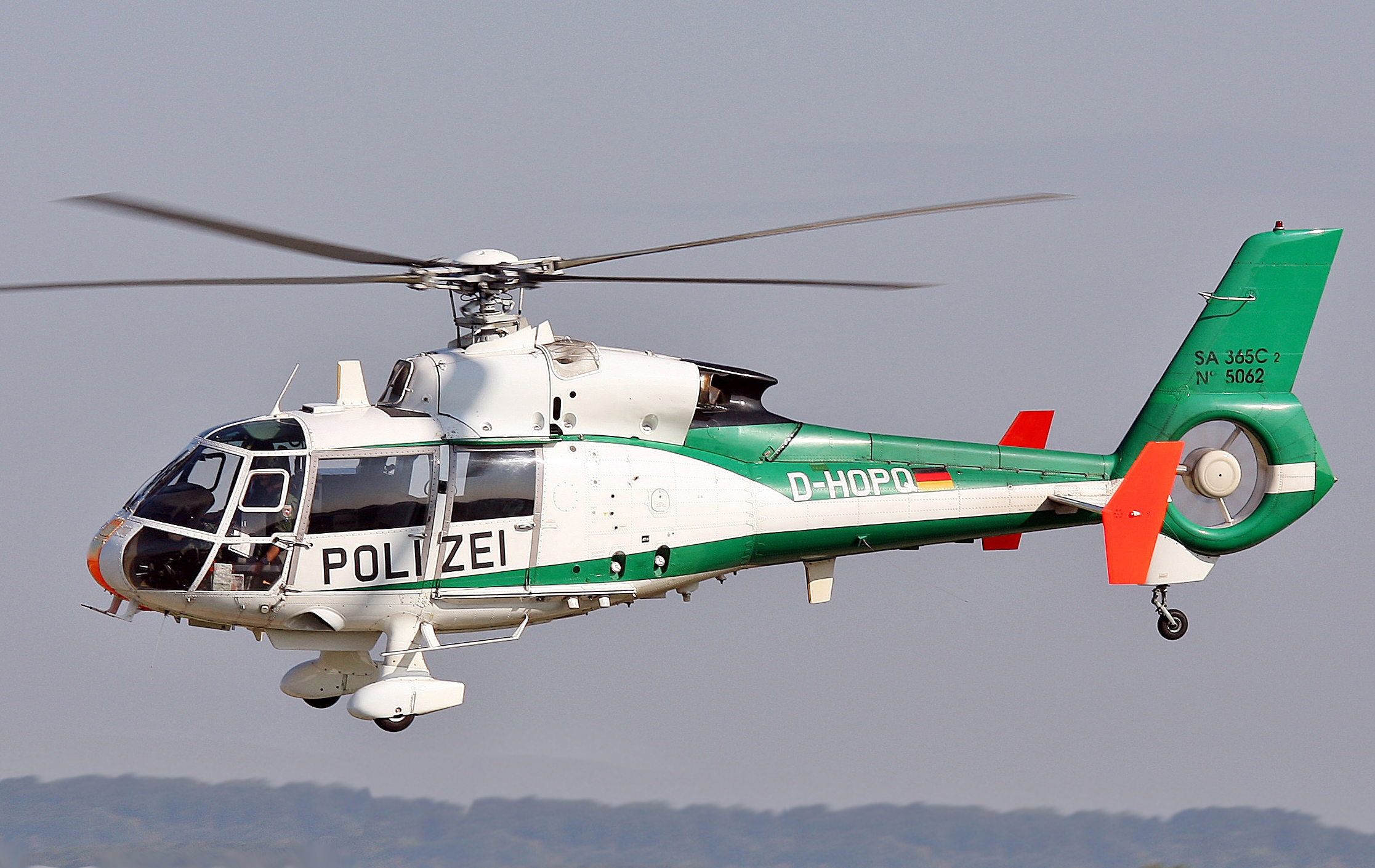
- Aérospatiale SA365C2 Dauphin of the German police

General information
- Type: Utility helicopter
- National origin: France
- Manufacturer: Aérospatiale
- Number built: 2 prototypes + 34 production examples

History
- Manufactured: 1976–1977
- Introduction date: 1976
- First flight: 2 June 1972
- Developed into: Eurocopter AS365 Dauphin

The Aérospatiale SA 360 Dauphin is a single-engine French utility helicopter that was developed and produced by aerospace manufacturer Aérospatiale.

Developed during the early 1970s as a replacement for the company's Alouette III helicopter, as well as to fill in an apparent gap in the company's existing product line, falling within the six to ten-seat helicopter category. Performing its maiden flight on 2 June 1972, the prototypes demonstrated the type's performance capacities by setting three world airspeed records for helicopters in the 1,750 kg – 3,000 kg class. The Dauphin was marketed towards both civilian and military customers.

Production of the SA 360 Dauphin was cancelled after the production run had been completed. Aérospatiale adapted the design into a twin-engine derivative of the SA 360, the Dauphin 2, which proved to be commercially successful, having been in production for in excess of 40 years.

== Development ==
During the 1960s, French aircraft company Sud Aviation, which merged into aerospace manufacturer Aérospatiale at the end of the decade, had developed a broad range of rotorcraft, including the Gazelle, a fast scout/light attack helicopter, and the Puma, a medium-sized utility helicopter. Towards the end of that decade, the company recognised that there was a vacant slot between the smaller Gazelle and the larger Puma for which a new helicopter could be developed to fulfil. Accordingly, during the early 1970s, Aérospatiale undertook a project to develop such a rotorcraft, resulting in the SA 360 Dauphin.

On 2 June 1972, the first of two Dauphin prototypes (registration F-WSQL) performed the first of 180 test flights in its original configuration. It was initially powered by a single Turbomeca Astazou XVI turboshaft engine, capable of generating up to 730 kW (980 hp) of thrust. The original design of the Dauphin drew heavily upon several of Aérospatiale's other rotorcraft, having adopted the fenestron anti-torque device of the Gazelle and the main rotor system of the Alouette III. Following an initial period of evaluation, a number of modifications were incorporated onto the prototypes. These included an increase of engine power with the adoption of the more powerful Astazou XVIIIA powerplant, capable of generating up to 780 kW (1,050 hp). Additionally, the original metal rotor blades were replaced with composite versions, Aérospatiale engineers had made this change for the purpose of reducing both vibration levels and instances of ground resonance.

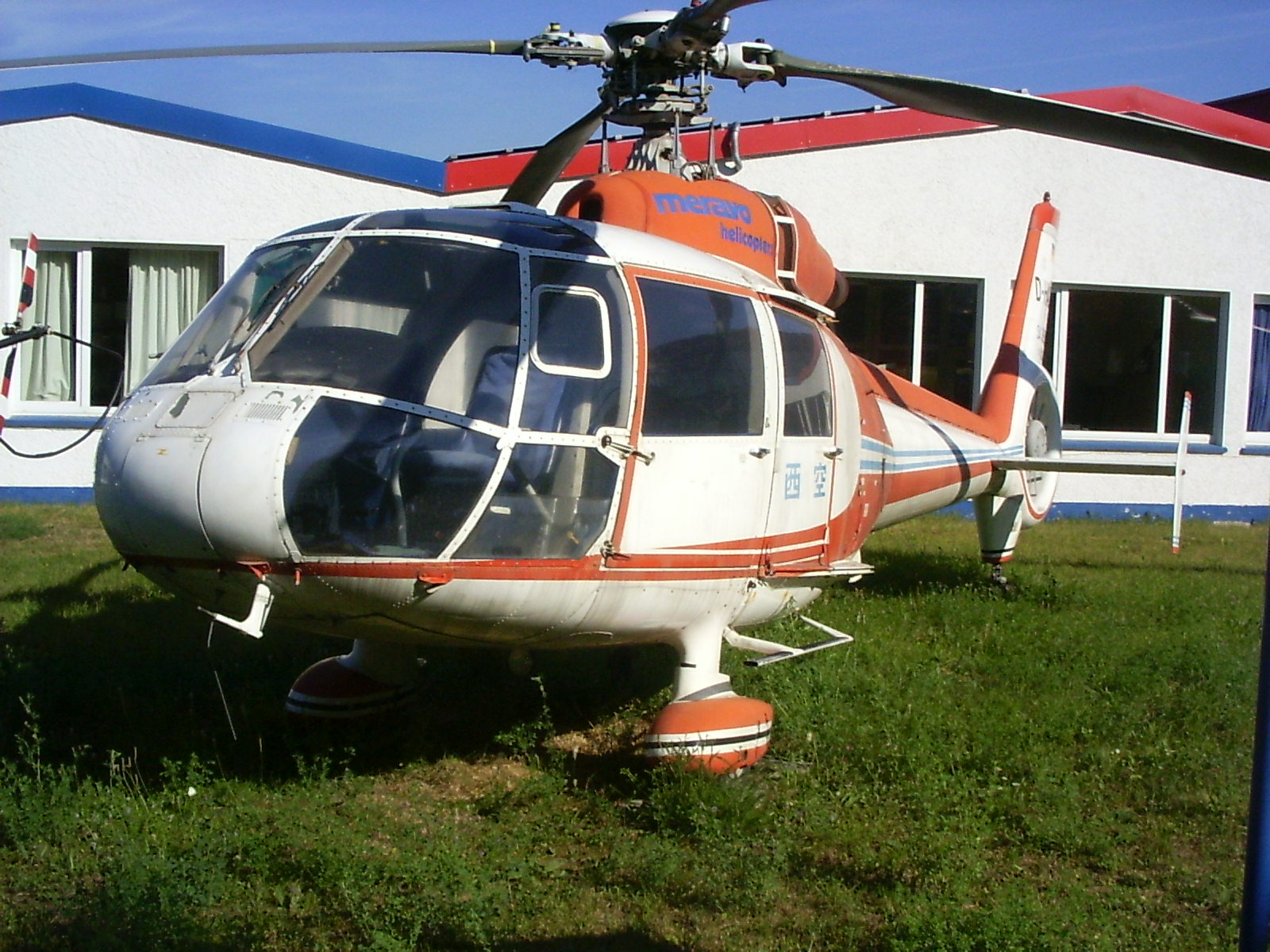
Aérospatiale SA 360C on static display, 2012

Post modifications, the test flights resumed in May 1973, in time to present the new aircraft at that year's Paris Air Show. In the meantime, a second prototype (registration F-WSQX) joined the test programme, flying first on 29 January. At the show, the first prototype broke three world airspeed records for helicopters in the 1,750 kg – 3,000 kg class (FAI class E-1d). Piloted by Roland Coffignot, while carrying a dummy payload to represent eight passengers, it broke the 100 km closed-circuit (299 km/h, 186 mph), 3 km straight-course (312 km/h, 195 mph), and 15 km straight-course (303 km/h, 189 mph) records.

Series production of the definitive SA 360C version was started in 1974; the first completed aircraft made its first flight during April 1975. French civil certification was obtained in December that year, while deliveries to customers commenced during January 1976. In the meantime, Aérospatiale had flown the prototype of the improved Dauphin 2 nearly a year prior to this, on 24 January 1975; which would ultimately prove the death-knell for the original Dauphin model. A helicopter of this size that was powered by only a single engine was perceived in the marketplace as something of an anomaly and rather under-powered, meaning that by the end of 1976, Aérospatiale was left with 15 airframes – almost half those produced to date – with no buyers. Accordingly, production of the type was end the following year, being replaced almost immediately by the twin-engined AS365 Dauphin.

A single airframe (Construction Number 1012, registration F-WZAK) was modified by Aérospatiale from the standard SA 360C configuration into a new version, which was optimised for hot-and-high conditions, designated SA 360H. The major differences from its former configuration were the installation of an even more powerful Astazou XXB engine, capable of providing up to 1,040 kW (1,400 hp), along with the adoption of the Starflex rotorhead which had been originally developed for the Aérospatiale AS350 Écureuil helicopter.

The company subsequently decided that the most likely customers for this more powerful model would to be military air arms, thus the sole rotorcraft was further modified and re-designated SA 360HCL (Helicoptere de Combat Leger – "Light Combat Helicopter"). In this configuration, it was outfitted with a SFIM APX M397 roof-mounted, gyro-stabilised sight, and a nose-mounted sensor package incorporating a SFIM Vénus night-vision system and TRT Hector thermal-vision system. Armament consisted of eight launcher tubes for Euromissile HOT missiles, with options to carry most of the armament packages used by the lighter Gazelle helicopter. Thus equipped, the SA 360HCL could carry thirteen combat-ready troops into battle, as well as be used in the area neutralisation or anti-tank role. This sole rotorcraft was taken on by the Armée de Terre for evaluation purposes, but no production order ever followed for the type.

== Design ==
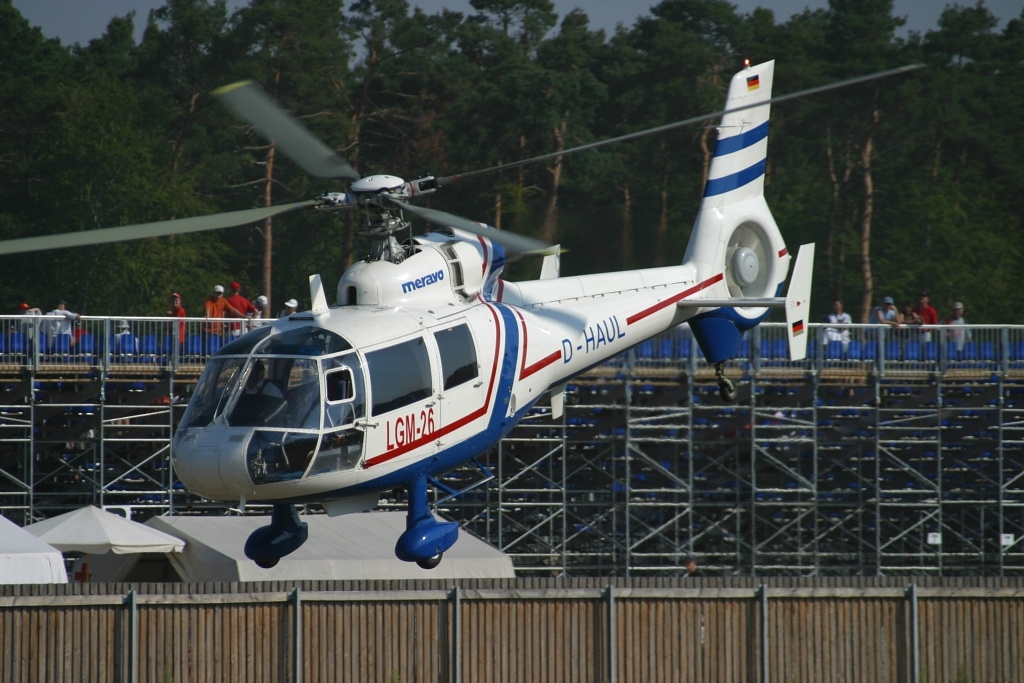
SA-360C Dauphin in flight

The Aérospatiale SA 360 Dauphin was a single-engine French utility helicopter. Much of its design was originally derived from the Alouette III that the Dauphin had been developed as a successor to, and thus shares many features, such as the rotor blades of its four-bladed main rotor, with this earlier rotorcraft. The majority of Dauphins were powered by a single Astazou XVIIIA powerplant, capable of generating up to 780 kW (1,050 hp) of thrust; this powerplant had been derived from the Astazou XIV engine that powered the latter-built examples of the Alouette III family. The Dauphin featured a fully enclosed cabin while could be provisioned with seating for a maximum of nine passengers. It was fitted with a fixed tailwheel undercarriage with spatted mainwheels; this arrangement was reportedly a source of difficulties while landing on compact helipads.

One of the Dauphin's more noticeable innovations over the Alouette III was the adoption of a thirteen-bladed fenestron anti-torque device embedded within its tail. While the fenestron had been first introduced a few years earlier upon another of Aérospatiale's rotorcraft, the Gazelle, the Dauphin's implementation featured considerable refinement over the earlier arrangement; the direction of rotation was reversed so that the blade on the bottom was the advancing blade, the original direction having proved unfavourable when encountering the downwash of the main rotor during early testing of the Dauphin. Testing demonstrated the fenestron to have clear performance advantages over the conventional tail rotor, leading to it being applied to numerous other rotorcraft following the Dauphin as well.

According to aviation author J. Mac McClellan, even in its original guise, the flying qualities of the Dauphin were generally appreciated by pilots. One small area of criticism was that pilots had to enter and exit the front seats via the main cabin, as the rotorcraft lacked forward crew doors; passengers were also inconvenienced by the presence of a sizable vertical column in the center of the cabin that accommodated the main pushrods. These shortcomings were addressed in subsequent versions of the twin-engined Dauphin 2.

== Variants ==
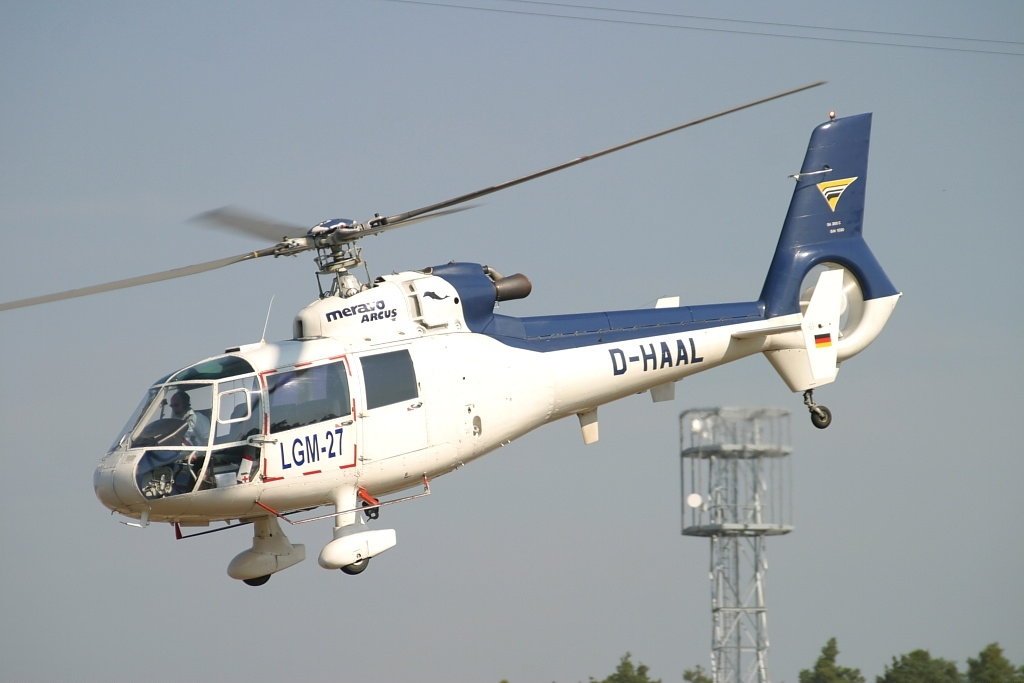
SA 360C Dauphin at Hockenheimring, Germany, 2003

- SA 360 – two prototypes
- SA 360C – standard production version, 34 built
- SA 360A – navalised version for Aeronavale, 1 converted from SA 360C.
- SA 361H – "hot and high" version with more powerful (969 kW (1,300 shp)) Astazou XX engine, glassfibre rotor blades and new rotor hub. Three converted from SA 360 and 360C.
  - SA 361HCL – militarised version, 1 converted from SA 361H.
- SA 365C2- Twin engined version with more powerful 2 × Turbomeca Arriel 1A2 turboshaft engines, 500 kW (670 hp) each.

== Operators ==
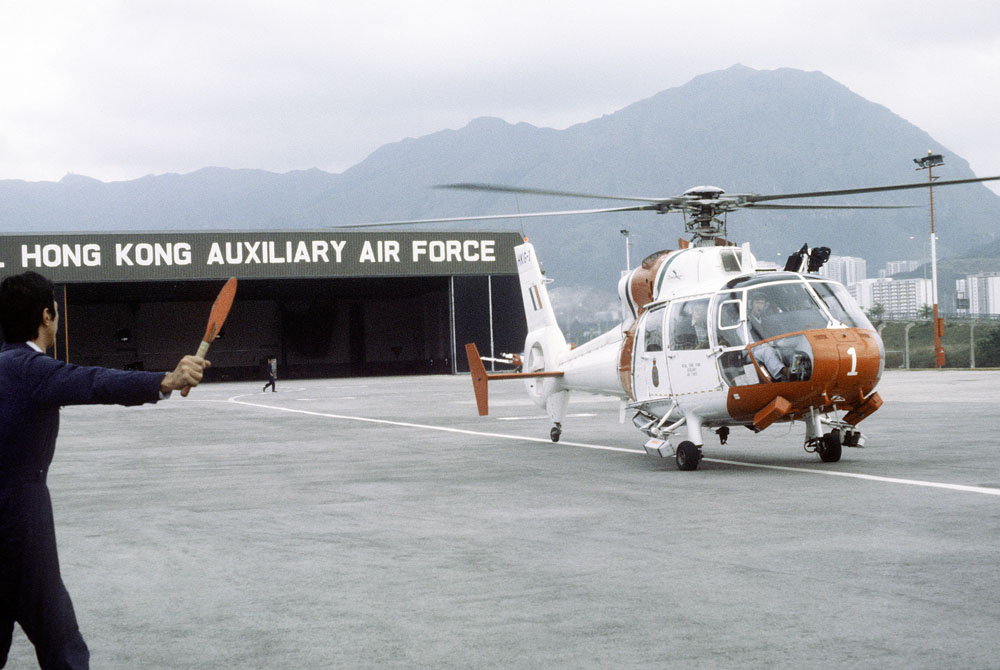
RHKAAF SA 360 Dauphin at Kai Tak Airport, Hong Kong, 1982

Hong Kong

- Royal Hong Kong Auxiliary Air Force

United States

- New York Helicopter

Slovenia

- Helitours - Operating two SA 365 C2

== Specifications (SA 360C Dauphin) ==
Data from Air International July 1995

General characteristics

- Crew: 1 or 2 pilots
- Capacity: 8–9 passengers
- Length: 13.20 m (43 ft 4 in) including rotor

10.98 m (36 ft) (fuselage length)

- Height: 3.5 m (11 ft 6 in)
- Empty weight: 1,580 kg (3,483 lb)
- Max takeoff weight: 3,000 kg (6,614 lb)
- Powerplant: 1 × Turbomeca Astazou XVIIIA turboshaft, 783 kW (1,050 hp)
- Main rotor diameter: 11.5 m (37 ft 9 in)
- Main rotor area: 103.9 m^{2} (1,118 sq ft)
- Blade section NACA 0012

Performance

- Cruise speed: 274 km/h (170 mph, 148 kn)
- Never exceed speed: 315 km/h (196 mph, 170 kn)
- Range: 675 km (419 mi, 364 nmi) (max fuel)
- Service ceiling: 4,600 m (15,100 ft)
- Rate of climb: 9 m/s (1,800 ft/min)

== See also ==
Related development

- Eurocopter AS365 Dauphin
- Eurocopter HH-65 Dolphin
- Harbin Z-9

Aircraft of comparable role, configuration, and era

- AgustaWestland AW119 Koala

Related lists

- List of rotorcraft
- List of utility helicopters
