= Newark Airport (disambiguation) =

Newark Liberty International Airport (FAA/IATA: EWR), is an airport in Newark, New Jersey, United States, serving the New York metropolitan area.

Newark Airport may also refer to:

- Newark Liberty International Airport (NJT station), a New Jersey Transit train station serving the airport
- Newark Airport Interchange, a highway interchange outside of Newark Liberty International Airport
- Newark Metropolitan Airport Buildings, the original buildings at the New Jersey airport, listed on the National Register of Historic Places
- Newark-Heath Airport (FAA: VTA), in Newark, Ohio, United States
