= Linden Airport =

In Union County, New Jersey, United states

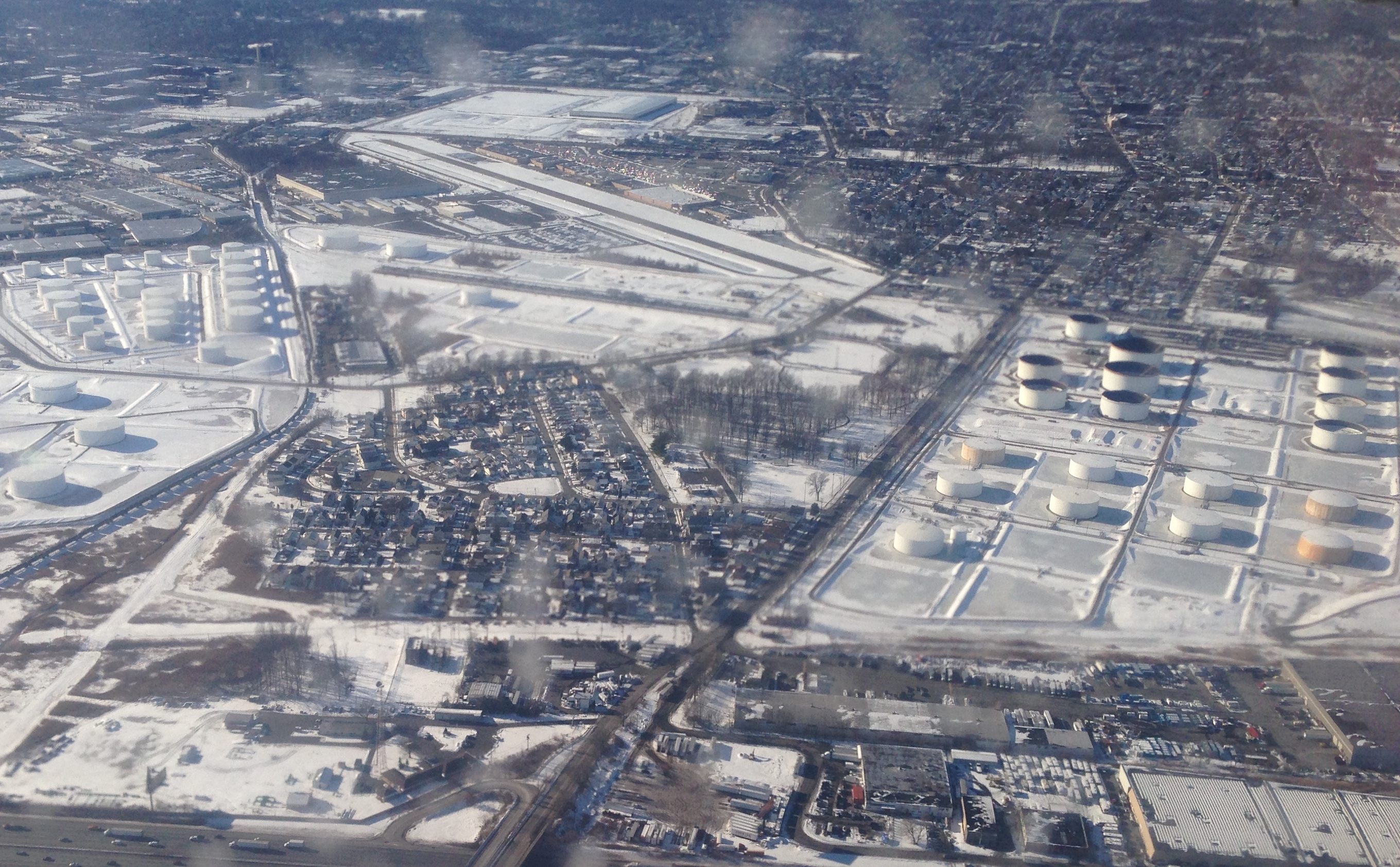
- IATA: LDJ; ICAO: KLDJ; FAA LID: LDJ

Summary
- Airport type: Public
- Owner: City of Linden
- Serves: Linden, New Jersey
- Elevation AMSL: 22 ft (6.7 m)
- Coordinates: 40°37′03″N 074°14′40″W
- Website: LindenAirportNJ.com

Map
- Interactive map of Linden Airport

Runways
Direction	Length		Surface
Direction	ft	m	Surface
9/27	4,140	1,262	Asphalt

Statistics (2022)
- Aircraft operations (year ending August 31, 2022): 57,400
- Based aircraft: 27
- Source: Federal Aviation Administration

Linden Airport (IATA: LDJ, ICAO: KLDJ, FAA LID: LDJ) is a mile southeast of downtown Linden, in Union County, New Jersey. Also known as Linden Municipal Airport, it is next to U.S. Route 1&9. The National Plan of Integrated Airport Systems for 2011–2015 categorized it as a general aviation reliever airport.

== History ==
During World War II General Motors automobile factory across the street from the airport called Linden Assembly, produced military aircraft.

When World War II started Grumman Aircraft Corporation contracted with the recently created Eastern Aircraft Corporation (a GM company) to take over the manufacture of the Wildcat and Avenger aircraft for the US Navy and its Allies. This would allow Grumman to focus on the development and production of Hellcat. The Wildcat was manufactured in Linden, NJ and transported by tunnel under the street to the Linden Airport for test flying and delivery.

Construction of Linden Airport was started in the spring of 1942 and completed by October 1942. During the war Eastern Aircraft produced about 3,600 FM-1 and FM-2 Wildcats. After the war Linden Airport was turned over to the city of Linden which still owns and operates the airport under contract.

The original airport with its intersecting runways and large hangar remained intact until 1998 when the City of Linden, needing more tax-ratable property decided to divide up the underutilized airport to create a shopping center called Aviation Plaza on the north side of the field. A new airport was built on the south side complete with new taxiways, hangars and parking areas. The only remaining part of the original airport is the west to east (9-27) runway.

The airport is the only non-towered (no control tower) airport in the New York City metro area. Its close proximity to New York City and relatively light air traffic makes it an ideal location for basing news helicopters for New York's news channels. The airport is home to many sightseeing and commuter helicopters that fill the skies over New York.

In 2010 Linden Airport hosted the New York City round of the Red Bull Air Race World Championship.

== Facilities ==
Linden Airport covers 120 acres (49 ha) at an elevation of 22 feet (7 m). Its asphalt runway, 9/27, is 4,140 by 100 feet (1,262 × 30 m).

In the year ending August 31, 2022, the airport had 57,400 aircraft operations, average 157 per day: 100% general aviation and <1% military. 27 aircraft were then based at this airport: 23 single-engine, 3 helicopter, and 1 multi-engine.

== Racing venue ==
The airport served as a temporary road racing course for the eighteenth race of the 1954 NASCAR Grand National (now NASCAR Cup Series) season. Buck Baker qualified on the pole position for the race with a speed of 80.536 miles per hour (129.610 km/h). Al Keller won the 50-lap race over a 2 miles (3.2 km) course on June 13 in a field of 43 cars. The rest of the top five finishers were Joe Eubanks, Baker, Bill Claren, and Bob Grossman. Finishing sixth through tenth were Larry LaVois, Herb Thomas, Dick Rathman, Laird Bruner, and Lee Petty.

== See also ==
- New Jersey World War II Army Airfields
- List of airports in New Jersey
