= New Jersey World War II Army Airfields =

New Jersey World War II Army Airfields
- Part of World War II

Site information
- Type: Army Airfields

Site history
- Built: 1940-1944
- In use: 1940-present

During World War II, the United States Army Air Forces (USAAF) established numerous airfields in New Jersey for training pilots and aircrews of USAAF fighters and bombers.

Most of these airfields were under the command of First Air Force or the Army Air Forces Training Command (AAFTC) (A predecessor of the current-day United States Air Force Air Education and Training Command). However the other USAAF support commands (Air Technical Service Command (ATSC); Air Transport Command (ATC) or Troop Carrier Command) commanded a significant number of airfields in a support roles.

It is still possible to find remnants of these wartime airfields. Many were converted into municipal airports, some were returned to agriculture and several were retained as United States Air Force installations and were front-line bases during the Cold War. Hundreds of the temporary buildings that were used survive today, and are being used for other purposes.

== Major Airfields ==
Air Transport Command

- Fort Dix Army Airbase, Fort Dix

95th Army Air Force Base Unit
Provided support for Fort Dix
Now: McGuire Air Force Base (1948-present) (IATA: WRI, ICAO: KWRI, FAA LID: WRI)

First Air Force

- Millville Army Airfield, Millville

441st Army Air Force Base Unit
Now: Millville Municipal Airport (IATA: MIV, ICAO: KMIV)

Air Technical Service Command

- Newark Army Airfield, Newark

438th Army Air Force Base Unit
Joint use USAAF/US NAVY/Civil Airport, Also provided POE(Port Of Entry) for New York Area.
Now: Newark Liberty International Airport (IATA: EWR, ICAO: KEWR)

- Linden Airport, Linden

Aircraft manufactured by General Motors were built at the defense plant adjacent to the airfield and flown out from here.
Now: Linden Airport (IATA: LDJ, ICAO: KLDJ)
