= Paul Mijksenaar =

Dutch designer

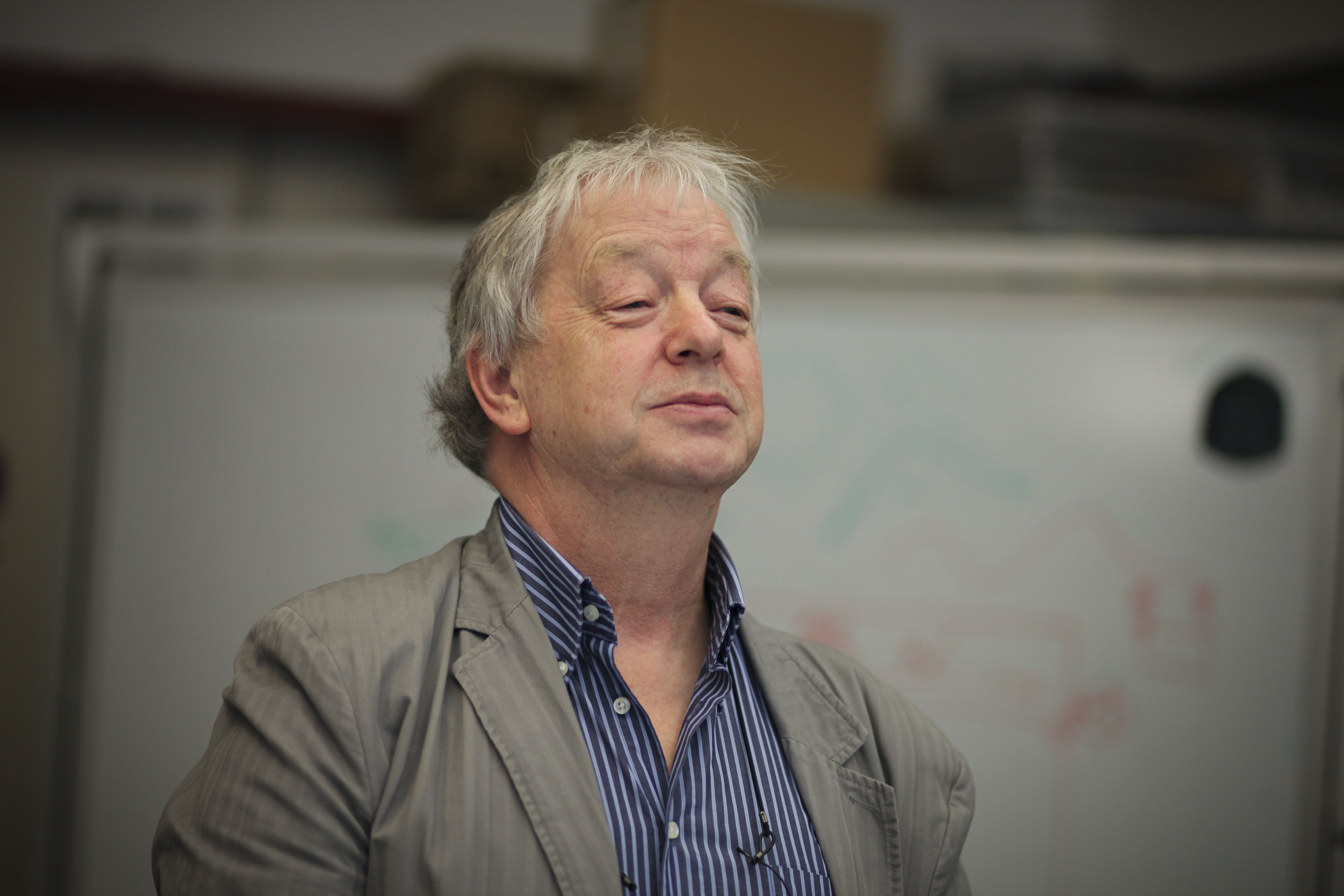
Paul Mijksenaar

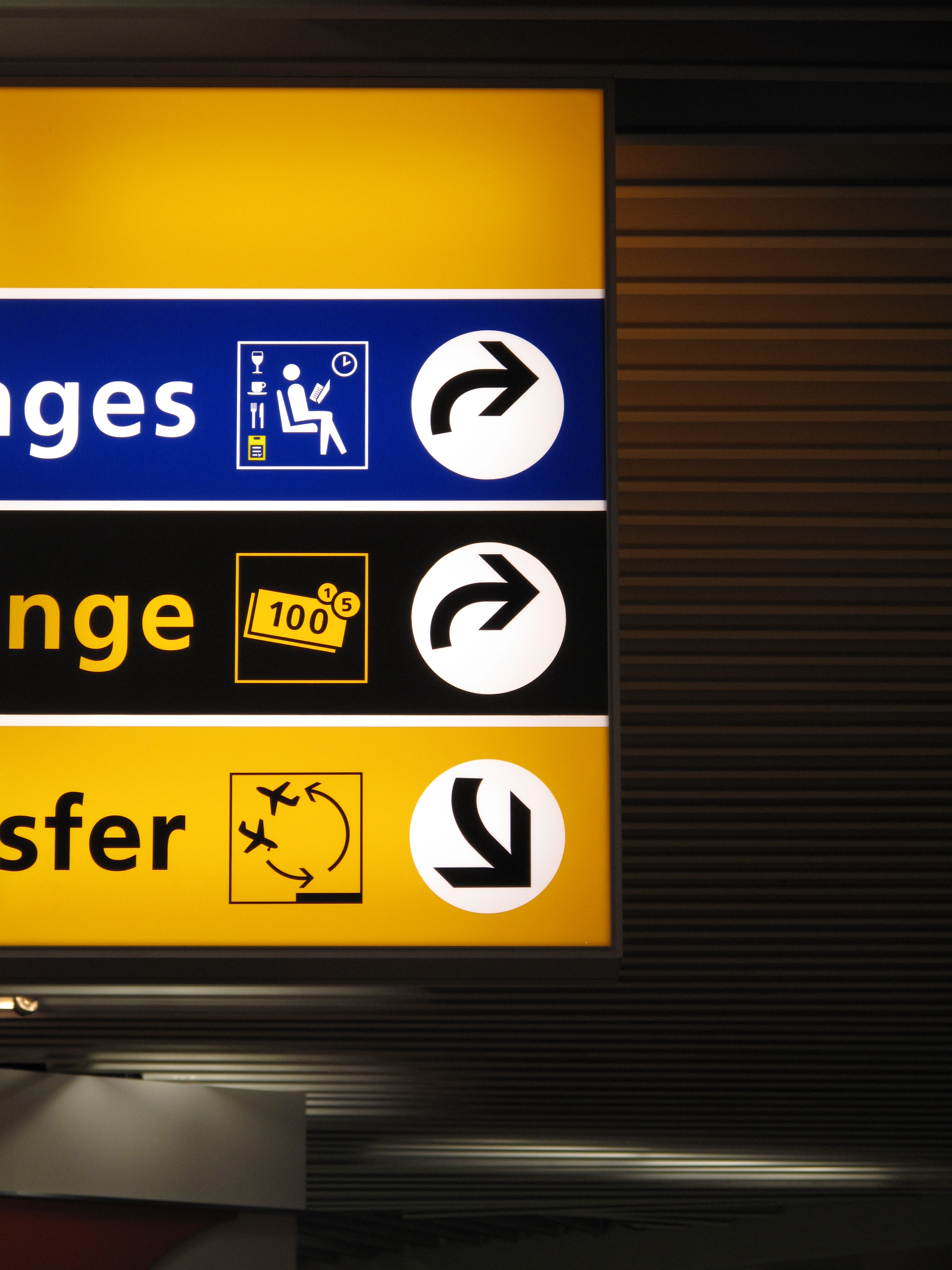
Wayfinding signs at Schiphol, designed by Mijksenaar

Paul Mijksenaar (born 1944) is a Dutch designer of visual information, and a founder and director of the international design firm Bureau Mijksenaar based in Amsterdam and New York City. He is known for designing wayfinding signage systems for railway stations and airports, including Schiphol Airport.

Mijksenaar was born in 1944 in Amsterdam. In 1965, he graduated from the Institute for Applied Arts Education Amsterdam (IvKNO, later the Gerrit Rietveld Academie) with a degree in product design. He started his career as a freelance product designer in 1966, later becoming a senior designer and team leader for the Associatie voor Total Design NV, also known as Total Design, in 1978, before establishing Bureau Mijksenaar in 1986.

Mijksenaar is a specialist in creating visual information systems, such as wayfinding signage for railway stations and airports including New York's JFK and LaGuardia, New Jersey's Newark, and Amsterdam's Schiphol. His work for the Port Authority of New York and New Jersey was echoed in the set design for Steven Spielberg's film The Terminal.

Besides his practice he is also a professor in Visual Information Design at the faculty of Industrial Design Engineering at the Delft University of Technology in the Netherlands. He also writes a monthly article in the Dutch newspaper NRC Handelsblad about everyday problems and solving them using information design.

== Publications ==
- Paul Mijksenaar (1997). Visual Function: an Introduction to Information Design. 010 Publishers. ISBN 9064503036.
- Paul Mijksenaar, Piet Westendorp (1999). Open here: the art of instructional design. Joost Elffers Books. ISBN 978-1556706172.
- Paul Mijksenaar (2008). Wayfinding at Schiphol. Publisher: Graphic Design Museum. ISBN 9072637275, 9789072637277.

== Awards and honors ==
Mijksenaar has been recognized globally for his pioneering contributions to wayfinding and information design:

- 1999: Oeuvre Prize, Beroepsorganisatie Nederlandse Ontwerper (BNO)
- 2014: Piet Zwart Prize, awarded by the Association of Dutch Designers (BNO) for lifelong achievement in visual information design
- 2015: Society for Experiential Graphic Design (SEGD) Fellow Award, recognizing his impact on global airport and transit wayfinding systems
