= Newark Liberty International Airport =

Airport in New Jersey, United States

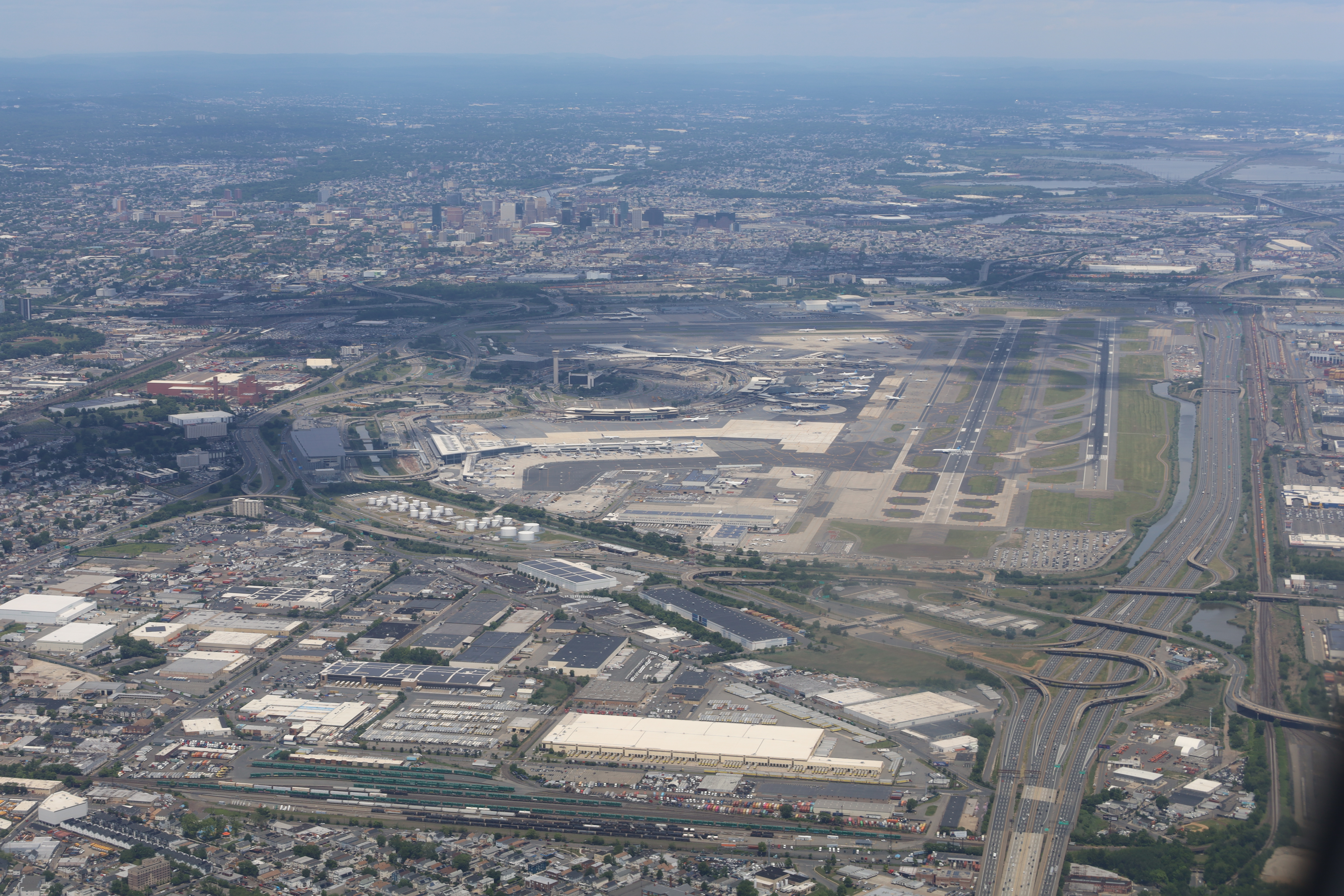
- Bird's-eye view in 2026
- IATA: EWR; ICAO: KEWR; FAA LID: EWR; WMO: 72502

Summary
- Airport type: Public
- Owner: Cities of Newark & Elizabeth
- Operator: Port Authority of New York and New Jersey
- Serves: New York metropolitan area; North Jersey
- Location: Newark and Elizabeth, New Jersey, U.S.
- Opened: October 2, 1928; 98 years ago
- Hub for: FedEx Express; United Airlines
- Time zone: EST (UTC−05:00)
  - Summer (DST): EDT (UTC−04:00)
- Elevation AMSL: 5 m (16 ft)
- Coordinates: 40°41′33″N 074°10′07″W
- Website: newarkairport.com

Maps
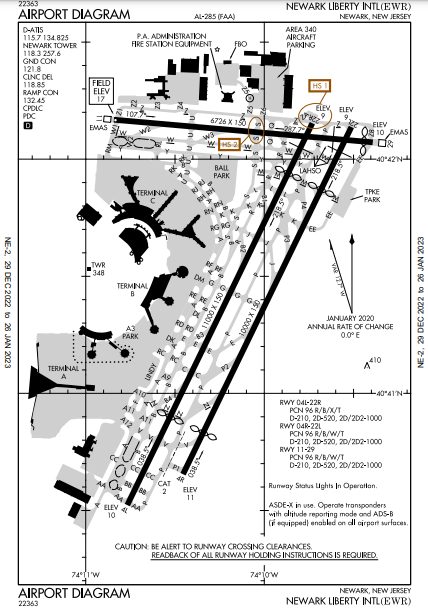
- FAA airport diagram
- Interactive map of Newark Liberty International Airport

Runways
Direction	Length		Surface
Direction	m	ft	Surface
4L/22R	3,353	11,000	Asphalt/concrete
4R/22L	3,048	9,999	Asphalt
11/29	2,050	6,725	Asphalt

Helipads
Number	Length		Surface
Number	m	ft	Surface
H1	16	54	Asphalt

Statistics (2025)
- Aircraft operations: 390,476
- Total passengers: 47,000,085
- Total cargo (US tons): 679,097 (616,066 tonnes)
- Source: Port Authority of New York and New Jersey, FAA

Newark Liberty International Airport (Note: Originally Newark Metropolitan Airport and later Newark International Airport; colloquially Newark Airport.) (IATA: EWR, ICAO: KEWR, FAA LID: EWR) is an international airport in the U.S. state of New Jersey, serving the New York metropolitan area. The airport is located in both Newark and neighboring Elizabeth, straddling the boundary between Essex and Union counties. Owned by the two cities, it is leased to its operator, the Port Authority of New York and New Jersey. Located approximately 4.5 miles (7.2 km) south of downtown Newark and 9 miles (14 km) west-southwest of Manhattan, it is a major gateway to destinations in Europe, South America, the Caribbean and Asia. It is the second-busiest airport in the New York airport system behind John F. Kennedy International Airport and ahead of LaGuardia Airport.

The airport is near the Newark Airport Interchange, the junction between both Interstate 95 and Interstate 78 (both of which are components of the New Jersey Turnpike), and U.S. Routes 1 and 9, which has junctions with U.S. Route 22, Route 81, and Route 21. AirTrain Newark connects the terminals with the Newark Liberty International Airport Station, which is served by NJ Transit's Northeast Corridor Line and North Jersey Coast Line and Amtrak's Northeast Regional and Keystone Service.

The City of Newark started building the airport in 1928 on 68 acres (28 ha) of marshland adjacent to Port Newark and U.S. Route 1. The Army Air Corps operated the facility during World War II. The Port Authority took over the facility in 1948, adding an instrument runway, a new terminal building, a new control tower, and an air cargo center. The airport's Building One from 1935 was added to the National Register of Historic Places in 1980.

During 2022, the airport served 43.4 million passengers, which made it the 13th-busiest airport in the nation, and the 23rd-busiest airport in the world. The busiest year to date was 2023, when it served 49.1 million passengers. Newark Liberty International serves 50 carriers, and is the largest hub for United Airlines by available seat miles. The airline serves about 63% of passengers at EWR, making it the largest tenant at the airport. United and FedEx Express, its second-largest tenant, operate in three buildings covering approximately 2 million square feet (0.19 km^{2}) of airport property.

== History ==
In the 1920s, the Newark area, was the site of two airfields: Heller Field, which opened in 1919, and Hadley Field, which opened in 1924, that were used by the United States airmail service. Heller Field was the first official postal field for dedicated mail service in the United States.

In May 1921, Heller Field was closed and all air mail services moved to Hadley Field, which by 1927 also served four airlines. The U.S. Postal Service, however, desired to have an airfield closer to New York City. In 1927, people and organizations, both national and local in scope, began calling for a new airport in the area of Newark, including Newark's mayor, Thomas Raymond.

On August 3, 1927, Raymond ordered plans for a new airport. Construction, which was estimated to cost $6 million (equivalent to $111,206,897 in 2025), began on April 1, 1928, along US Route 1 and Port Newark. The construction involved a land reclamation project to create 68 acres (28 ha) of level ground, 6 feet (1.8 m) above sea level to prevent flooding, upon which a 1,600-foot (490 m) runway was to be laid. In addition to the 6,735,000 cubic yards (181,800,000 ft^{3}; 5,149,000 m^{3}) of earth required for the reclamation, 7,000 Christmas trees and 200 bank safes donated by a local junk vendor were used.

The airport opened on October 1, 1928, dubbed the Newark Metropolitan Airport. It was the first major airport to serve the New York metropolitan area, the first commercial airport in the United States and the first with a paved airstrip. The first lease for space at Newark Airport was signed by Canadian Colonial Airways in April 1928.

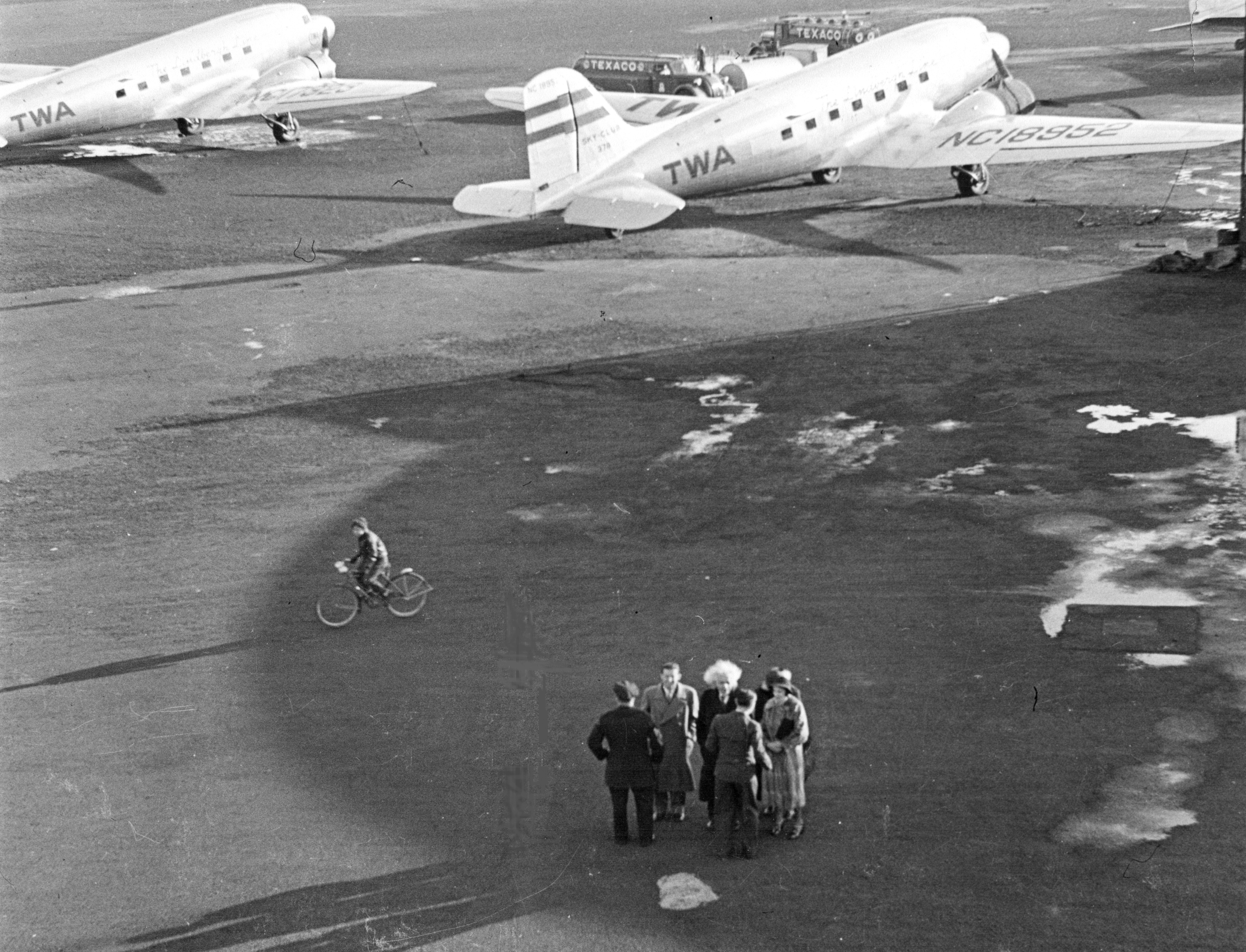
Albert Einstein at Newark Airport in April 1939

The nation's first air traffic control tower and airport weather station opened at Newark in 1930. The Art Deco style Newark Metropolitan Airport Administration Building (Building 51), adorned with murals by Arshile Gorky, was built in 1934 and dedicated by Amelia Earhart in 1935. It was the first passenger terminal in the United States and featured the nation's first air route traffic control center (ARTCC). It served as the terminal until the opening of the North Terminal in 1953.

Construction of the Brewster Hangar began in 1937 and continued through 1938. This hangar was the most advanced of its time. It was added to the National Register of Historic Places in 1979 and is now a museum and Port Authority Police headquarters.

Despite these innovations, critics said the airport was poorly designed because there was no separation of incoming and outbound passengers and no thought given to future expansion, though this did not stop Newark from being the busiest commercial airport. United Airlines, American Airlines, Eastern Airlines, and TWA signed 10-year leases with the airport that ended in 1938. Then they would pay on a month-to-month basis until LaGuardia Airport opened in December 1939; by the middle of 1940, all passenger airlines had left Newark, no longer making it the world's busiest airport.

=== World War II ===
When the United States joined World War II in late 1941, the field was closed to commercial aviation, and it was taken over by the United States Army for logistics operations. The growing importance of supplying the overseas air forces and the need for more efficient control of supply shipments led to the activation of the Atlantic (and the Pacific) Overseas Air Service Commands on October 1, 1943. With headquarters at Newark, New Jersey (and Oakland, California for the Pacific Command), the Atlantic Overseas Air Service Command exercised control over the movement of Air Corps cargo through the ports of embarkation on the Atlantic and Gulf coasts.

In 1945, captured German aircraft brought from Europe on HMS Reaper for evaluation under Operation Lusty were off-loaded at Newark, and then flown or shipped to Freeman Field in Indiana, or Naval Air Station Patuxent River in Maryland.

=== Reopened ===
The airlines returned to Newark in February 1946, when it was reopened to commercial service. In 1948, the city of Newark leased the airport to the Port of New York Authority, now the Port Authority of New York and New Jersey. As part of the lease agreement, Port Authority took operational control of the airport and began investing heavily in capital improvements, including new hangars, a new terminal, and runway 4/22.

On December 16, 1951, a Miami Airlines C-46 bound for Tampa, lost a cylinder on takeoff from runway 28 and crashed in Elizabeth, killing 56. On January 22, 1952, an American Airlines CV-240 crashed in Elizabeth while on approach to Runway 6, killing all 23 aboard and seven on the ground. On February 11, 1952, a National DC-6 crashed in Elizabeth following takeoff from runway 24, killing 29 of 63 on board and four on the ground.

Following these accidents, Newark was temporarily closed in February 1952. Most of Newark Airport's traffic shifted to Idlewild, today known as John F. Kennedy International Airport, with the remaining traffic shifted to LaGuardia Airport. These moves allowed planes to takeoff and land over the water rather than over the densely populated areas surrounding Newark Airport. Newark remained closed until November 1952, with the introduction of new flight patterns and a new runway that directed planes away from Elizabeth. Additionally, Newark became the first airport to allow nighttime operations after installing runway lights for added safety. The airport's unpopularity and the New York area's growing air traffic led to searches for new airport sites. Port Authority's proposal to build a new airport at what is now the Great Swamp National Wildlife Refuge was defeated by local opposition.

=== Rebuilt and expanded ===
Through the early 1970s, Newark had a single terminal building located on the north side of the field by what is now Interstate 78. A new control tower opened in 1960, and the terminal was expanded from 26 to 32 gates in 1965. A $200 million expansion of the airport, which was to include three terminals, began in 1967 after three years of planning. In 1973, the airport was renamed Newark International Airport. Former Terminal A and present Terminal B opened in 1973, although some charter and international flights requiring customs clearance remained at the North Terminal. The main building of Terminal C was completed at the same time, but only metal framing work was completed for the terminal's satellites. It would lay dormant until the mid-1980s, when, for a brief time, the western third of the terminal was readied for international arrivals and used for People Express transcontinental flights. Terminal C was then completed, and opened in June 1988.

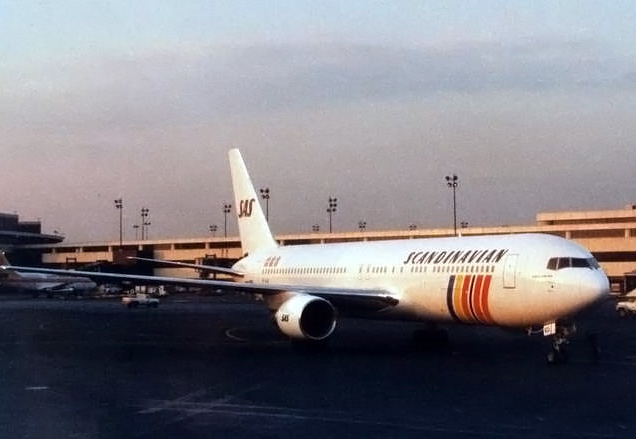
Scandinavian Airlines at Newark Airport in 1991

Underutilized in the 1970s, Newark's traffic expanded dramatically in the 1980s. People Express struck a deal with the Port Authority to use the North Terminal as its air terminal and corporate office in 1981 and began operations at Newark that April. It grew quickly, increasing Newark's traffic through the 1980s. Virgin Atlantic began service between Newark and London in 1984, challenging JFK's status as New York's international gateway. Federal Express (now known as FedEx Express) opened its second hub at the airport in 1986.

When People Express merged into Continental Airlines in 1987, operations (including corporate office operations) at the North Terminal were reduced, and the building was demolished to make way for cargo facilities in early 1997. This merger started the dominance of Continental Airlines, and later United Airlines, at Newark Airport.

On July 22, 1981, a railroad tank car carrying ethylene oxide caught fire at the freight yard in Port Newark, causing the evacuation of a one-mile radius including an evacuation of the North Terminal building of the airport.

In late 1996, the airport's monorail system opened, connecting the three terminals, the overflow parking lots and garages, and the rental car facilities. A new International Arrivals Facility also opened in Terminal B that same year. The monorail was expanded to the new Newark Airport train station on Amtrak's Northeast Corridor line in 2001, and was renamed AirTrain Newark.

=== 21st century ===
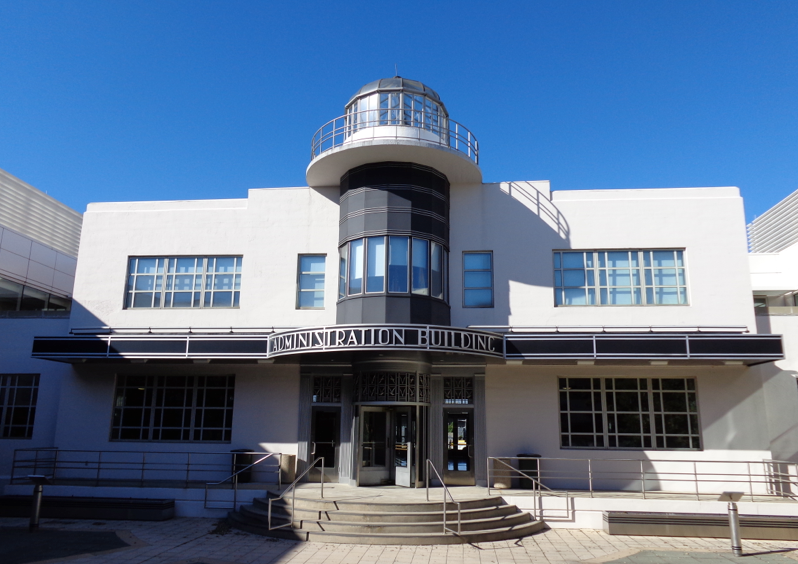
Newark Airport's historic Building One after its move and restoration in 2000

In 2000, following a runway extension, the Port Authority moved the historic Building 51 and renamed it to Building One. The building, which weighs more than 7,000 short tons (6,200 long tons; 6,400 t), was separated into three sections, hydraulically lifted, placed atop dollies and rolled about 0.75 miles (1.21 km) to its current location. It is now the home of the airport's administrative offices. In 2004, the current 325 feet tall (99 m) control tower opened and the former tower was demolished.

==== September 11 attacks ====
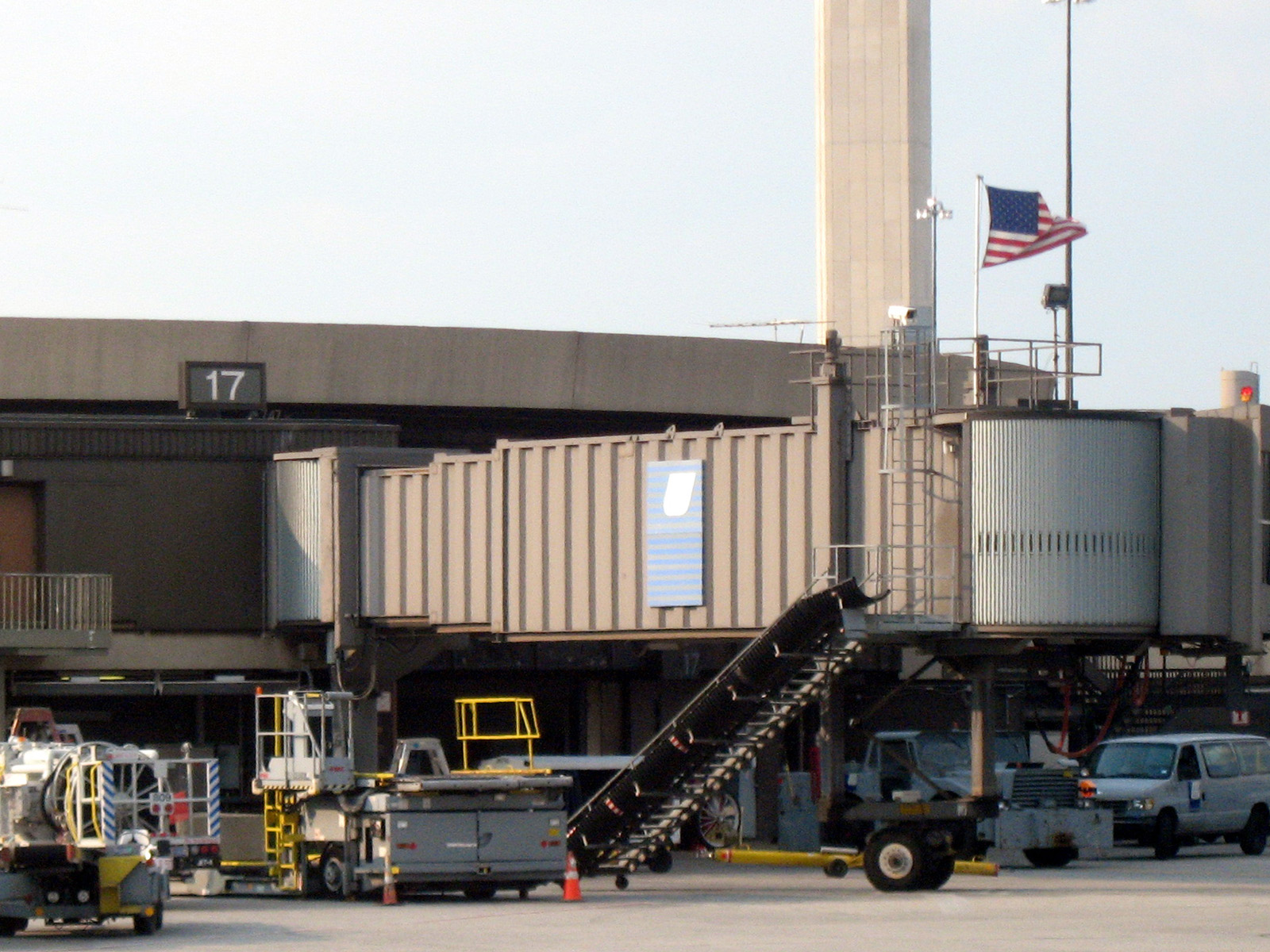
An American flag flies over the airport's departure gate A17 (old Terminal A), where al-Qaeda terrorists boarded United Airlines Flight 93 during the September 11 attacks. Although the gate had been demolished as of 2022, the jetway for Gate A17 (pictured in 2006) was preserved.

After the hijacking and subsequent crash of United Airlines Flight 93 during the 2001 September 11 attacks, the airport's name was changed from Newark International Airport to Newark Liberty International Airport in 2002. This name was chosen over the initial proposal, Liberty International Airport at Newark, and pays tribute to the victims of the September 11 attacks and to the landmark Statue of Liberty, lying 7 miles (11 km) east of the airport.

On September 10, 2021, a new 9/11 memorial was dedicated at the historic former administration building, Building One. It features a steel base plate with a small piece of an exterior column from southwest corner of the South Tower of the former World Trade Center.

In 2025, the Port Authority donated the "Gate A17" sign from the previous Terminal A where Flight 93 departed from to the Flight 93 National Memorial in Shanksville, Pennsylvania.

==== International traffic expansion ====
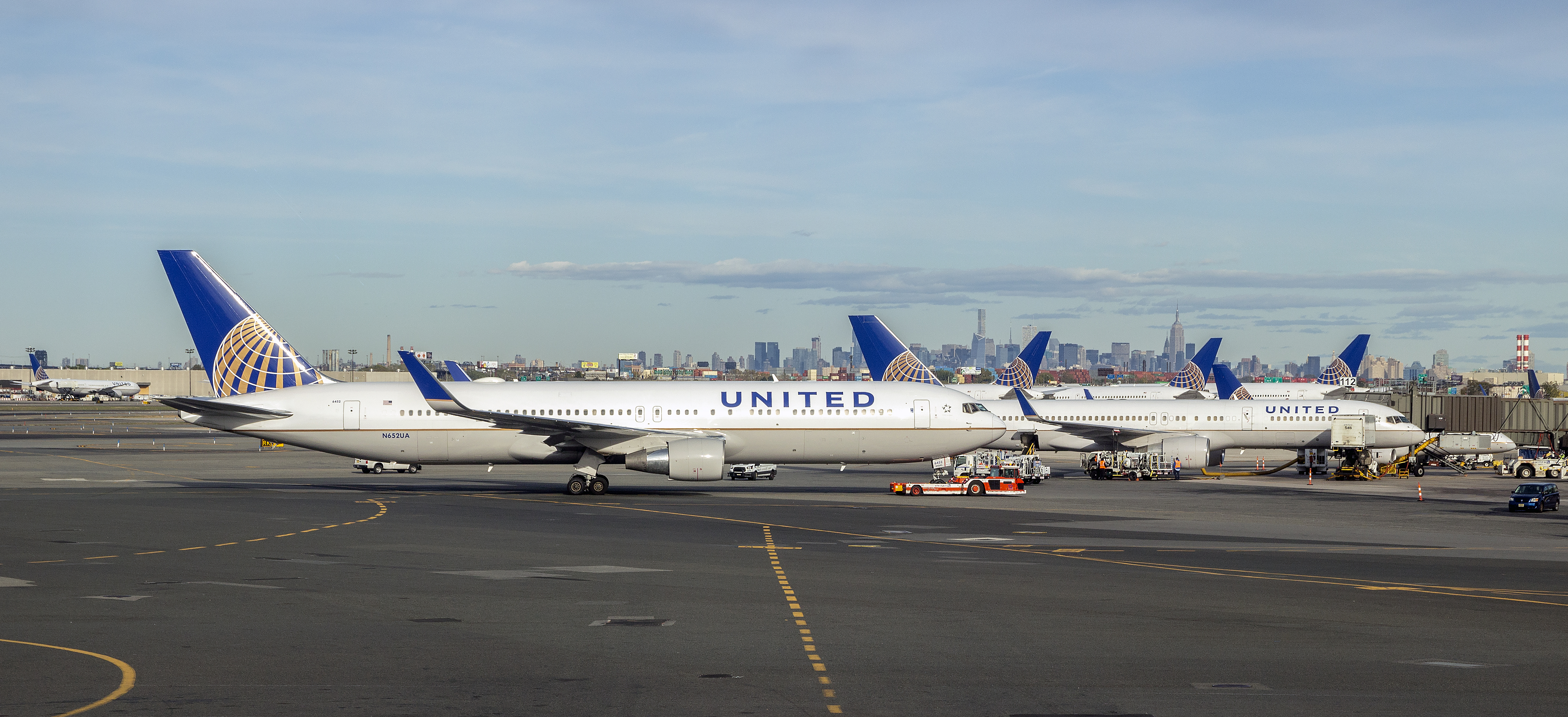
View of the Manhattan and Jersey City skylines from Newark Airport with United Airlines planes serving the airport in October 2016

Continental Airlines began flying from Newark to Hong Kong on March 1, 2001, followed by Beijing–Capital on June 15, 2005, and to Delhi on November 1, 2005, all using a Boeing 777-200ER aircraft. The airline soon started flights to Mumbai. On July 16, 2007, Continental announced it would seek government approval for nonstop flights between Newark and Shanghai–Pudong, which began on March 25, 2009, also using a Boeing 777-200ER aircraft. Newark was the only airport in the New York metropolitan area used by Philippine Airlines (PAL), until financial problems in the late 1990s compelled the airline to terminate this service.

In June 2008, flight caps were put in place to restrict the number of flights to 81 per hour. The flight caps, in effect until 2009, were intended to be a short-term solution to Newark's congestion. After the cap expired, the FAA embarked on a seven-year-long project to reduce congestion in all three New York area airports, as well as the surrounding flight paths.

Newark is a major hub for United Airlines (Continental Airlines before the 2010 merger). United has its Global Gateway at Terminal C, having completed a major expansion project in 2003 that included a new third concourse, a new ramp control tower and a new Federal Inspection Services facility. With its Newark hub since 2010 (inherited from Continental in the merger), United has the most service of any airline in the New York area. On March 6, 2014, United opened a new 132,000-square-foot (12,300 m^{2}), $25 million hangar on a 3-acre (1.2 ha) parcel to accommodate their wide-body aircraft during maintenance. In June 2015, the airline announced plans to leave JFK altogether and streamline its transcontinental operations at Newark.

Southwest Airlines began service at the airport in 2011, flying to ten cities. It ended all Newark service in November 2019, primarily due to the Boeing 737 MAX groundings, low demand, and inadequate facilities, and consolidated its New York area operations to Long Island and LaGuardia.

In October 2015, Singapore Airlines announced intentions to resume direct nonstop service between Newark and its main hub at Changi Airport, which had ended in November 2013. The airline announced that service would resume some time in 2018, and the Airbus A350-900ULR was chosen as the aircraft for the route. On May 30, 2018, Singapore Airlines officially announced that nonstop service between Newark and Singapore would begin on October 11, 2018, and Newark Liberty once again became host to what was then the world's longest non-stop flight.

On July 7, 2016, the United States Department of Transportation announced that Newark was one of ten cities to first operate flights to José Martí International Airport in Havana, Cuba.

==== Redevelopment and growth ====
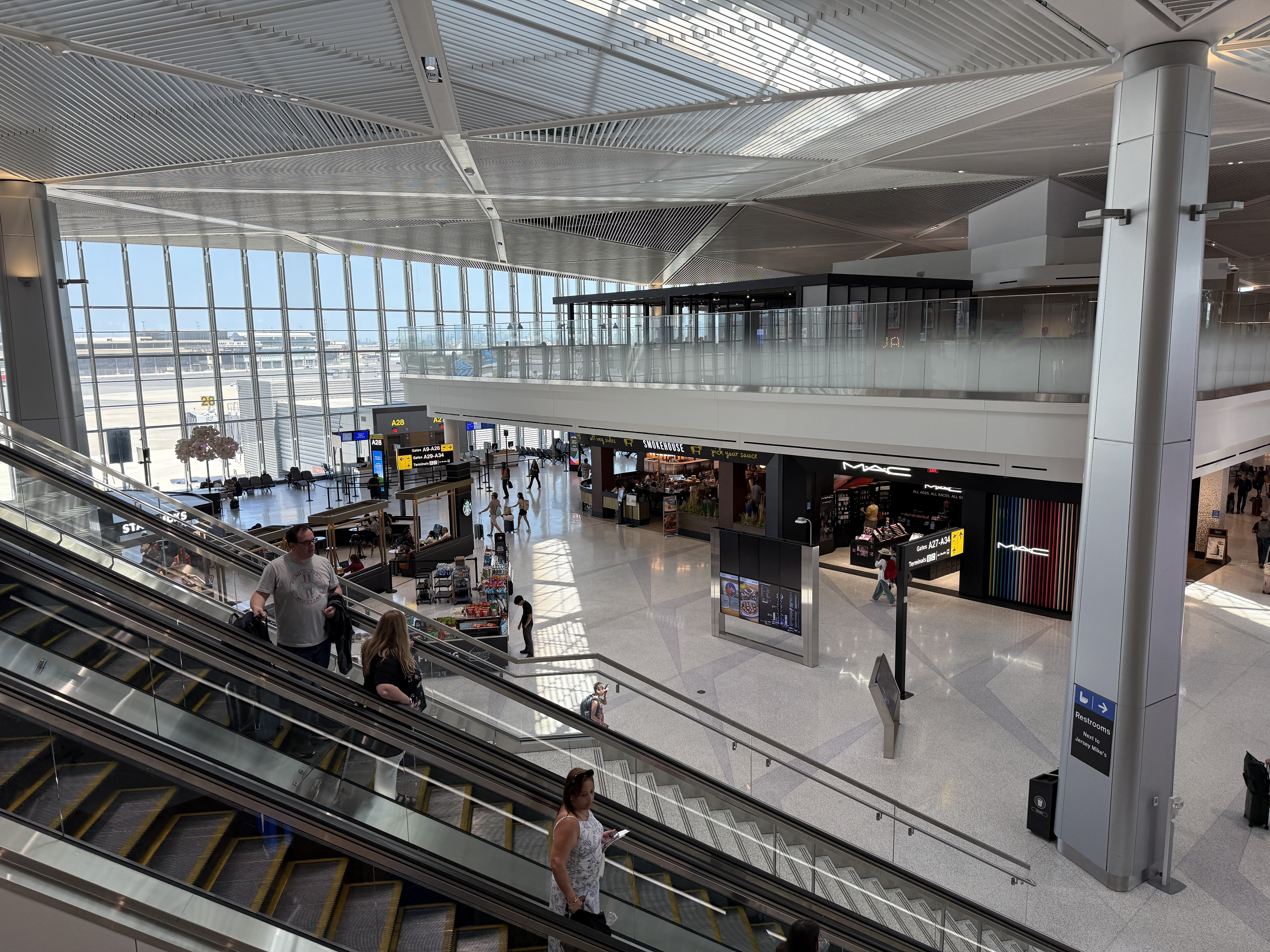
Interior of the new Terminal A in 2025

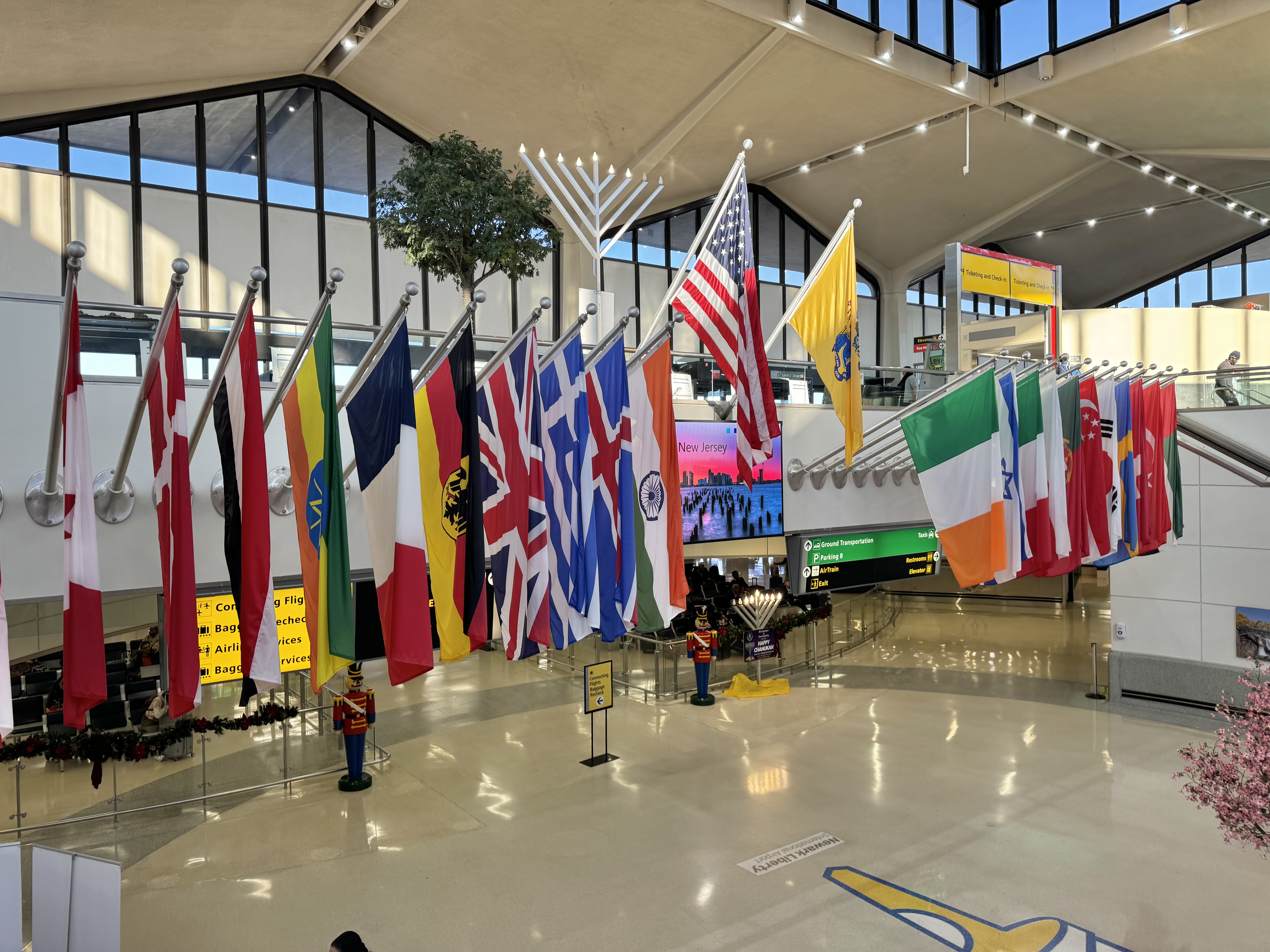
Flags of countries served from Newark, displayed in Terminal B in 2023

In 2016, the Port Authority approved and announced a redevelopment plan to replace Terminal A, set to fully open in 2022. A $2.7 billion investment, the new terminal was expected to increase passenger flow and gate flexibility between airlines, and would also be accompanied by a replacement for the AirTrain Newark monorail system, scheduled for completion in 2024. The new Terminal A officially opened on December 8, 2022. The new Terminal A has 33 gates, increasing Newark's gate total to 125, including 16 gates that can be alternated to accommodate either 2 narrow-body aircraft or 1 wide-body aircraft.

As a result of the COVID-19 pandemic in the United States, which affected countless services across the New York City area, aircraft operations at Newark went through drastic changes, with only 15,892,892 passengers in 2020, despite having 46,336,452 the previous years, the most in its history. Alaska Airlines trimmed its Newark schedule to three daily flights and leased their gates (A30 and A31) to JetBlue to accommodate their increased operations. In June 2022, United Airlines announced they would cut about 50 domestic flights from Newark in an effort to reduce delays.

On January 11, 2023, the FAA system outage across the United States caused 103 flights from Newark to be grounded, the third highest in the country.

In October 2022, the Port Authority of New York and New Jersey (PANYNJ) announced their EWR Vision, which will cover short- and long-term development through 2065. Officials named Arup, a global top aviation planning and design firm, to partner with SOM, who has done several projects with the Port Authority and EWR prior. The start of their plans included finishing the new Terminal A, which was successfully completed in January 2023, and replacing the old AirTrain, which was expected to be completed sometime in 2026, but later pushed to 2029. Goals for the project include creating a World Class Gateway for New Jersey, creating long-term economic growth, and creating a phase-by-phase plan that will not affect the airport's operations, while simultaneously expanding it to accommodate passenger and cargo growth in that time.

In October 2024, after extensive outreach to airport stakeholders, local community leaders and the public, PANYNJ unveiled the findings of the EWR Vision. Major elements of the EWR Vision Plan include:

- Terminal development: The plan calls for building a new, world-class international terminal to replace the current Terminal B, while enhancing Terminal C to improve the customer experience. Both would complement the airport's award-winning new Terminal A that opened in January 2023, which could also see further expansion. The spacious, streamlined terminals would allow the airport to accommodate continued growth in passenger volume, while leaving space for further expansion as needed.
- Airside development: The plan envisions improving the airport's operations with a more efficient and resilient taxiway network, while accommodating the industry trend toward larger aircraft. The new network would increase parking capacity and flexibility for aircraft, while creating redundancies to minimize delays during irregular operations. It incorporates additional deicing facilities, allowing aircraft to push off from gates more quickly. It would also include the industry's latest safety standards, increasing straight taxiway segments and minimizing the need for crossings.
- Landside development: The blueprint looks to transform the airport's vehicular and multi-modal access, prioritizing efficiency and convenience for all users. Alongside terminal buildings, frontages would be expanded to meet industry standards, providing ample space for passenger waiting, loading and unloading while minimizing walking distances. AirTrain access would be simplified, while connectivity and amenities for cyclists, pedestrians, and service vehicles would be improved. The roadway network would also be streamlined to reduce decision points and separate major flows with independent circulation for each terminal.

In August 2026, United Airlines debuted its newest aircraft, the "Born to Explore" Airbus A321XLR, and announced the largest international expansion in the airline's history with eight new nonstop routes from Newark. The new routes are to Luxembourg City; Marseille, France; Ibiza and Valencia, Spain; Terceira Island in the Azores; Ljubljana, Slovenia; Olbia, Sardinia; and Catania, Sicily.

As of 2025, Newark serves 50 carriers and is the fourth-largest hub for United Airlines after Denver International, Chicago O'Hare and Houston George Bush Intercontinental. During a 12-month period ending in March 2022, over 63% of all passengers at the airport were carried by United Airlines. The second-busiest airline is JetBlue Airways, which carries 11.4%, followed by American Airlines, which carries 5.6%. The second largest tenant is FedEx, which operates in 3 buildings on around two million square feet of the airport's property.

== Facilities ==
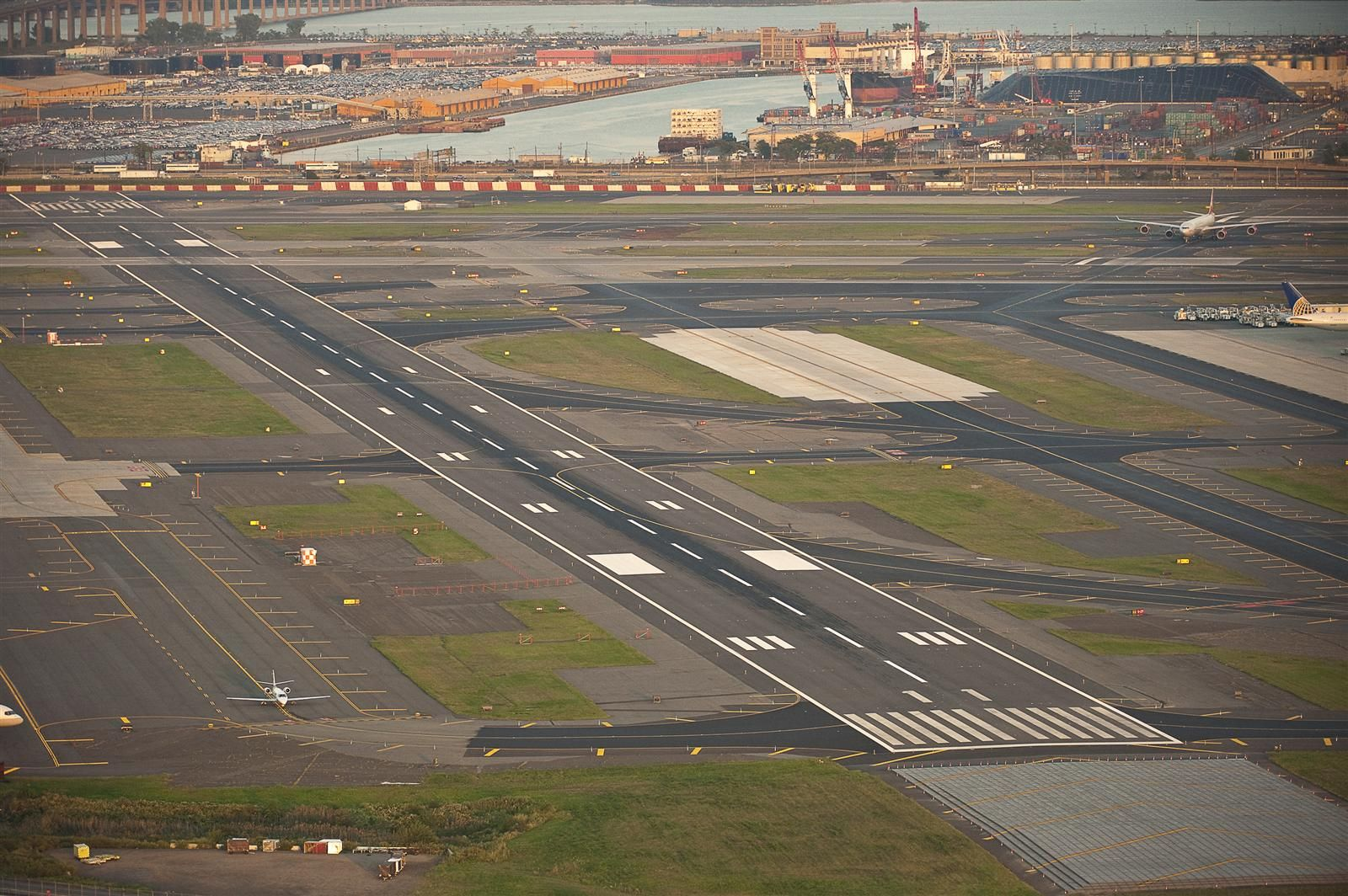
Runway 11/29 at the airport with Foreign Trade Zone No. 49 (in background) in February 2016

=== Runways and taxiways ===
The airport covers 2,027 acres (820 ha) and has three runways and one helipad:

- 4L/22R: 11,000 by 150 feet (3,353 m × 46 m), asphalt/concrete, grooved
- 4R/22L: 9,999 by 150 feet (3,048 m × 46 m), asphalt, grooved
- 11/29: 6,725 by 150 feet (2,050 m × 46 m), asphalt, grooved
- Helipad H1: 54 by 54 feet (16 m × 16 m), asphalt

Runway 11/29 is one of the three runways built during World War II. In 1952, Runways 1/19 and 6/24 were closed and a new Runway 4/22 (now 4R/22L) opened at a length of 7,000 ft (2,100 m). After 1970, this runway was extended to 9,800 feet (3,000 m), shortened for a while to 9,300 ft (2,800 m) and finally reaching its present length by 2000. Runway 4L/22R opened in 1970 at a length of 8,200 ft (2,500 m) and was extended to its current length by 2000.

The airport has more than 12 miles of 75-foot-wide taxiways. In 2014, the Port Authority completed a $97 million rehabilitation project of Runway 4L/22R while adding four new taxiways to reduce delays. Three of the new taxiways allow multiple planes to stage for departure at the end of the runway, reducing takeoff delays, while the other new taxiway will allow arriving planes to exit the runway faster and get to the gates quicker.

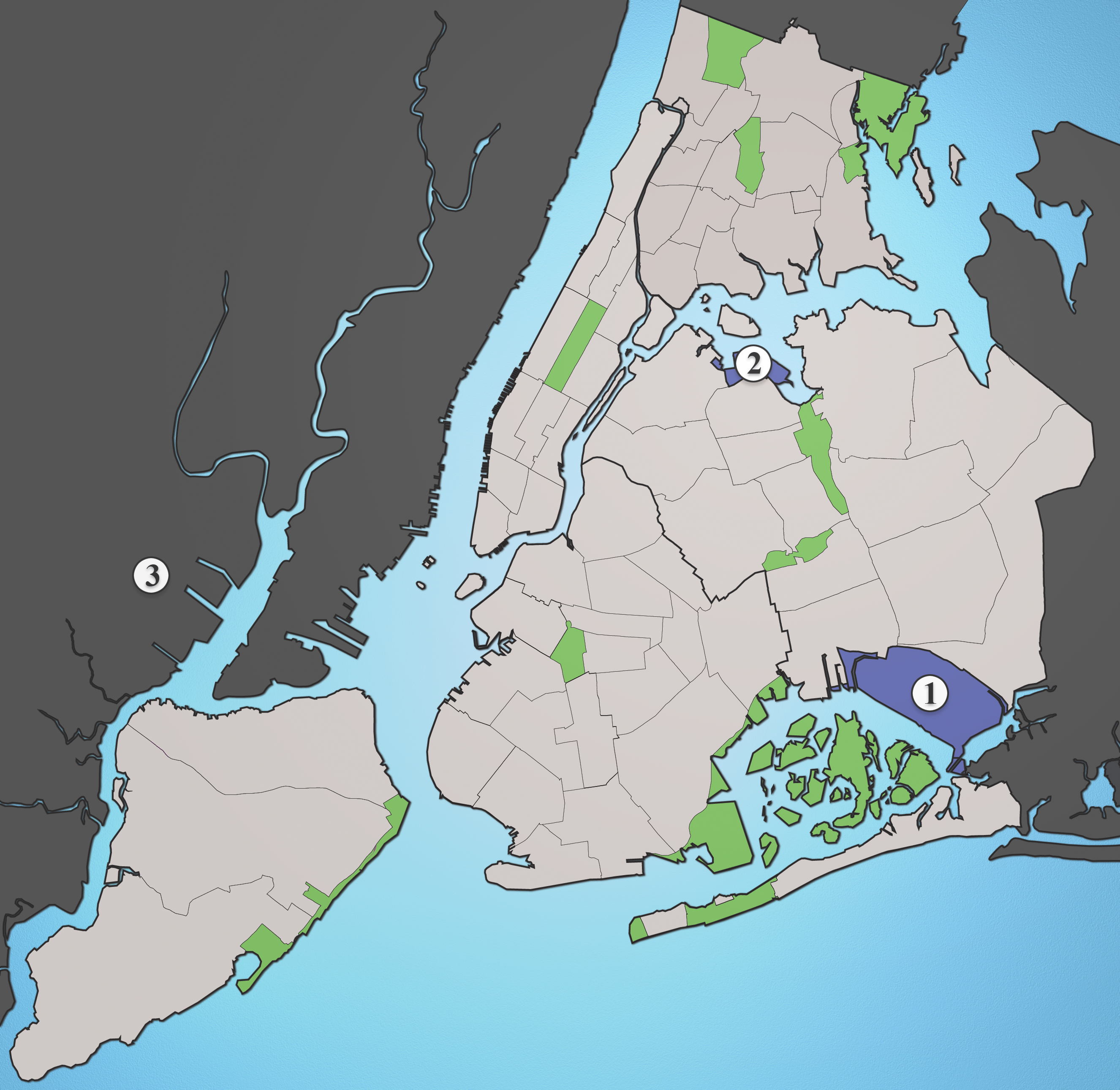
A map of the three major international airports in the New York metropolitan area: JFK (1), LGA (2), and EWR (3)

All approaches except Runway 29 have Instrument Landing Systems and Runway 4R is certified for Category III approaches. Runway 22L had been upgraded to CAT III approach capability.

Runway 4L/22R is primarily used for takeoffs while 4R/22L is primarily used for landings, and 11/29 is used by smaller aircraft or when there are strong crosswinds on the two main runways. Newark's parallel runways (4L and 4R) are 950 feet (290 m) apart, the fourth-smallest separation of major airports in the U.S., after San Francisco International Airport, Los Angeles International Airport, and Seattle–Tacoma International Airport. Helipad H1 is used by Blade, a helicopter service that goes to EWR and JFK from their heliport on East 34th street in New York City with the purpose of going to and from the airport in under 5 minutes. They use the Bell 407 helicopter.

Unlike the other two major New York–area airports, JFK and LaGuardia, which are located directly next to large bodies of water (Jamaica Bay and the East River, respectively) and whose runways extend at least partially out into them, Newark Airport and its runways are completely land-locked. While located just across Interstate 95 from Newark Bay and not far from the Hudson River, the airport does not directly front upon either body of water.

=== Cargo ===
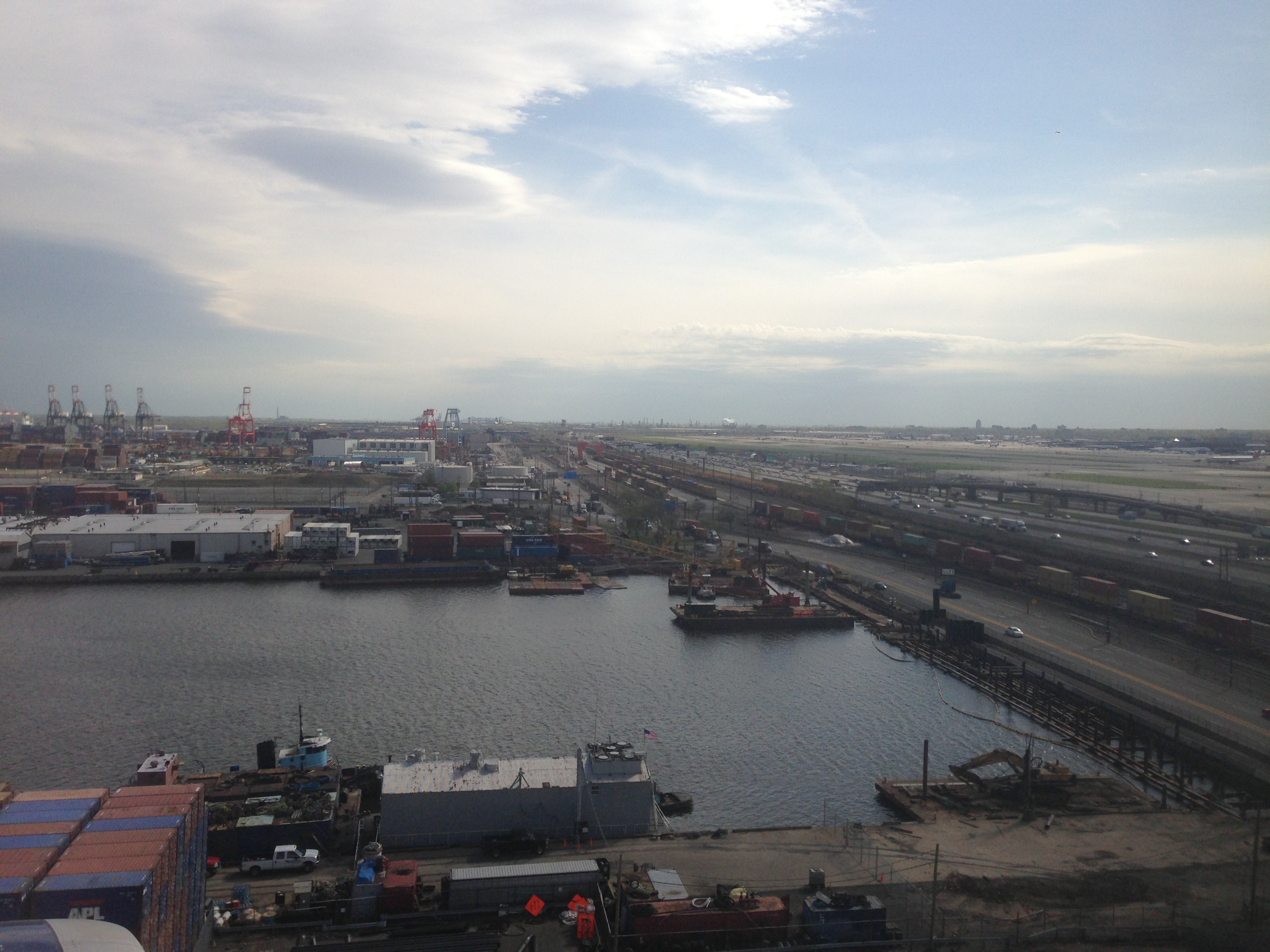
Port Newark, adjacent to the airport, in May 2014

In 1997, the North Terminal was torn down to make a new air cargo facility. EWR now has almost 1 million square feet of total cargo facility space, and 290 acres (120 ha) are dedicated to cargo operations. The airport is in both Newark, Essex County and Elizabeth, Union County, and is adjacent to Port Newark–Elizabeth Marine Terminal and Foreign-Trade Zone No. 49. It serves more than 45 air carriers with nearly 1,200 daily arrivals and departures to domestic and international destinations. Climate-controlled warehouse areas and cold storage accommodate perishable items.

Aeroterm operates buildings 339 and 340, and the designated United Airlines cargo facility was constructed in 2001. The FedEx Cargo Complex is a $60-million sort facility at its Newark Hub that includes Buildings 347, 156 and most of 155. Building 157 is a cargo building used by several tenants. Construction of it was completed in 2003. UPS completed construction of their new cargo building in 2019.

=== Law enforcement ===
Law enforcement at Newark Liberty International Airport is the responsibility primarily of the Port Authority of New York and New Jersey Police Department. In addition to normal uniformed patrol of terminals, concourses, and parking lots, the PAPD provides anti-crime plainclothes units, criminal investigative detective squads, counter-terrorism units, high-value cargo escorts and patrols, dignitary protection, marine patrol of surrounding waters, passenger screening point protection and security, Aircraft Rescue Fire Fighting and community outreach. The Newark Command of the PAPD is also responsible for security at Teterboro Airport.

The PAPD operates alongside partner agencies, including the Transportation Security Administration (TSA), U.S. Customs and Border Protection (CBP), the New Jersey State Police and the Newark Police Division.

=== Air traffic control ===
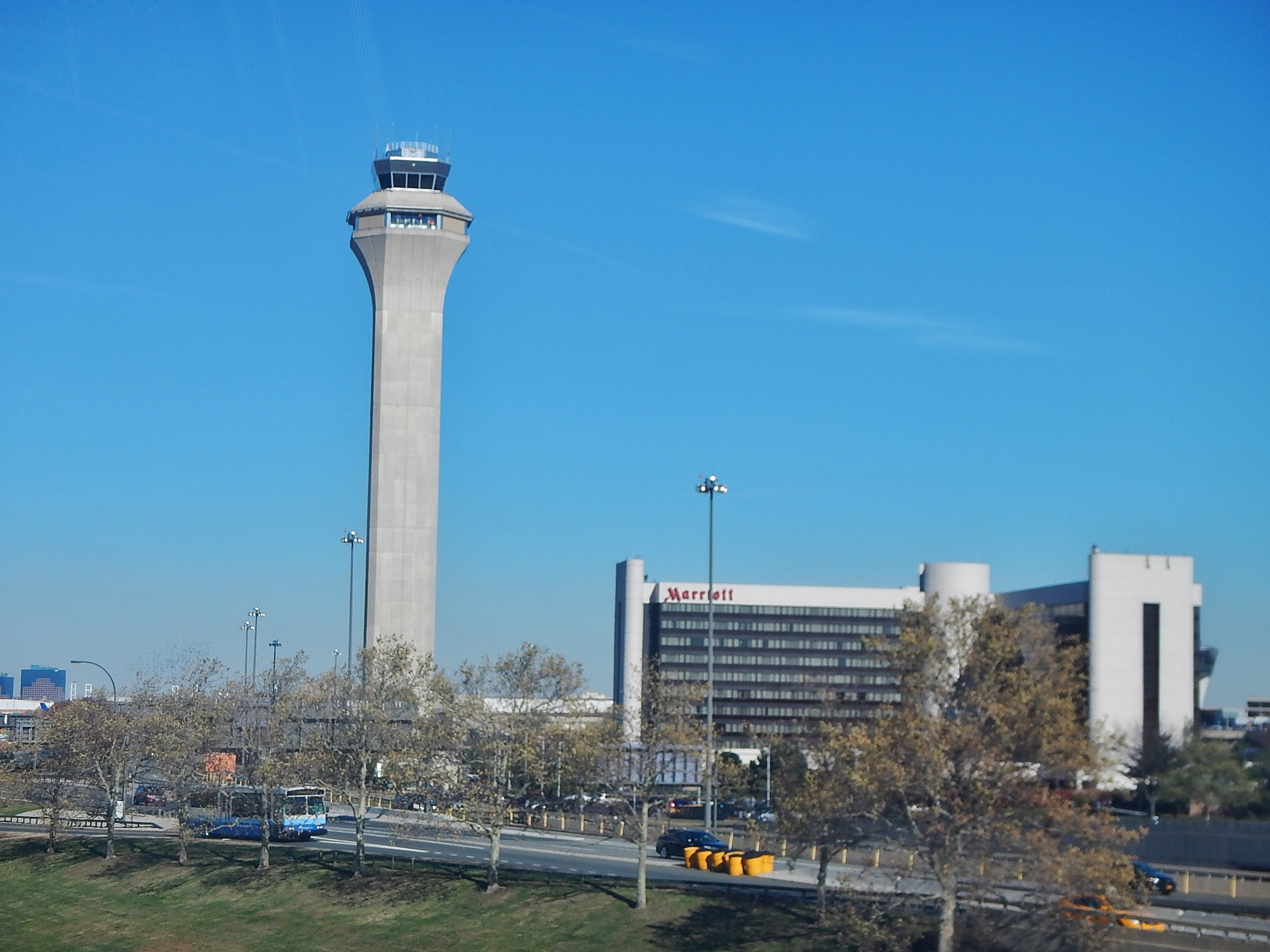
Newark Liberty International Airport's air traffic control tower next to the Marriott Hotel in November 2014

In December 1935, the airport's first air control station came into existence following a flight that crashed outside of Kansas City, killing five people, including a U.S. senator. The airport's original terminal, or Building 51, also known as the Administration Building housed the first air traffic control tower for the airport, and was designed by John Homlish in the 1930s. A concrete brutalist-styled and toothbrush-shaped control tower was built in 1960, and opened on January 18 of that year, designed by architect Allan Gordon Lorimer; the cost of the construction was estimated to be $1.5 million. In 2004, the Lorimer tower was closed and demolished and replaced by the current taller control tower which is 325 feet tall (99 m). The current tower is located next to a Marriott hotel, which is located on the airport's property and overlooks the Manhattan skyline and the George Washington Bridge.

In August 2026, the FAA installed a new surface movement radar (SMR) at Newark to help controllers reduce delays and better track plane and vehicle movements around the airport even in inclement weather. The installation is part of a larger $30 million project to modernize Newark's air traffic control system by replacing copper wire-based telecommunications with fiber-optic communication while transitioning to a new digital system and software by 2028. Prior to the installation of SMR, Port Authority installed transponders on 25 firetrucks, emergency vehicles and maintenance and operations vehicles used on the airfield. The transponders give each vehicle a unique identifying code trackable by air traffic control.

=== Solar power generation ===
In 2023, the Port Authority installed a five megawatt rooftop canopy of 12,708 solar panels on top of the new Terminal A parking garage that is the size of six football fields and the largest solar roof at any airport in the United States. When the photovoltaic system produces more power than needed, the electricity is exported to the Public Service Electric & Gas (PSE&G) power grid for sale. The new Terminal A also has solar tiles inlaid in the glass canopies that protect passengers from weather on the departing flights level.

In 2026, five additional locations at Newark Liberty were announced to receive new solar installations. They include the parking lot for Buildings 79/80 at the northeast corner of the airport campus, the roof of the Terminal C garage, the roof of the P4 parking garage, and the rideshare holding lot. The installations combined will provide five megawatts of power and the rideshare lot will provide fast-charging electric vehicle (EV) stations.

=== Other facilities ===
There are several hotels adjacent to Newark Liberty International Airport. Hotels such as Courtyard by Marriott and the Holiday Inn are located on the airport's property. Signature Flight Support is the only fixed-base operator at the airport, providing various services to private aircraft. Terminals A, B, and C all have short-term parking lots. Garage P4 can access the AirTrain directly. Economy Parking P6 can be accessed from the terminals using the Port Authority shuttle bus. An Exxon gas station with a 7-Eleven store (both with street address 100 Lindbergh Road) is located on the airport's property.

== Terminals ==
Across the airport's three terminals, there are 125 gates: Terminal A has 33, Terminal B has 24, and Terminal C has 68.

Gate numbering starts in Terminal A with Gate A1 and ends in Terminal C at C138. Wayfinding signage throughout the terminals was designed by Paul Mijksenaar, who also created signage for LaGuardia and JFK Airports.

=== Terminal A ===
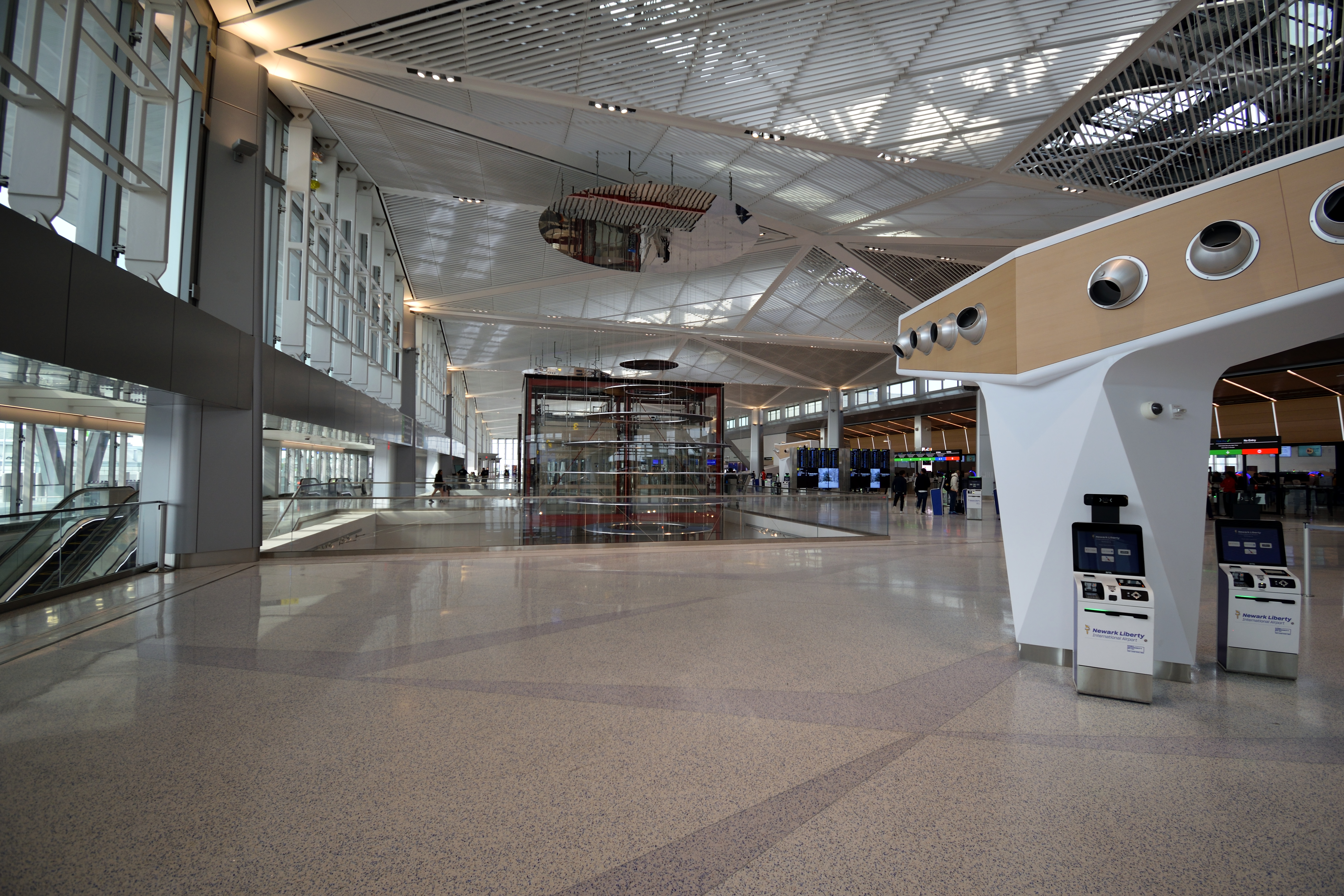
The upper floor of Terminal A

In March 2017, the Port Authority approved the project to build a new Terminal A, replacing the original terminal, which opened in 1973. Built on a site once occupied by United Parcel Service and the United States Postal Service, the new terminal cost around $2.7 billion and includes redesigned roadways with 8 new bridges, a new six-level, 2,700-car parking garage and rental center, 33 gates, and a walkway to connect the AirTrain station, parking garage, and terminal building. The terminal officially opened on December 8, 2022. However, due to continued testing of the fire alarm and security system as well as a hesitance from the PANYNJ to open a brand new terminal ahead of the 2022 holiday season, the grand opening was delayed to January 12, 2023, at which 17 of the total 33 gates opened – all on the south side of the terminal. The rest of the 33 gates opened in August 2023.

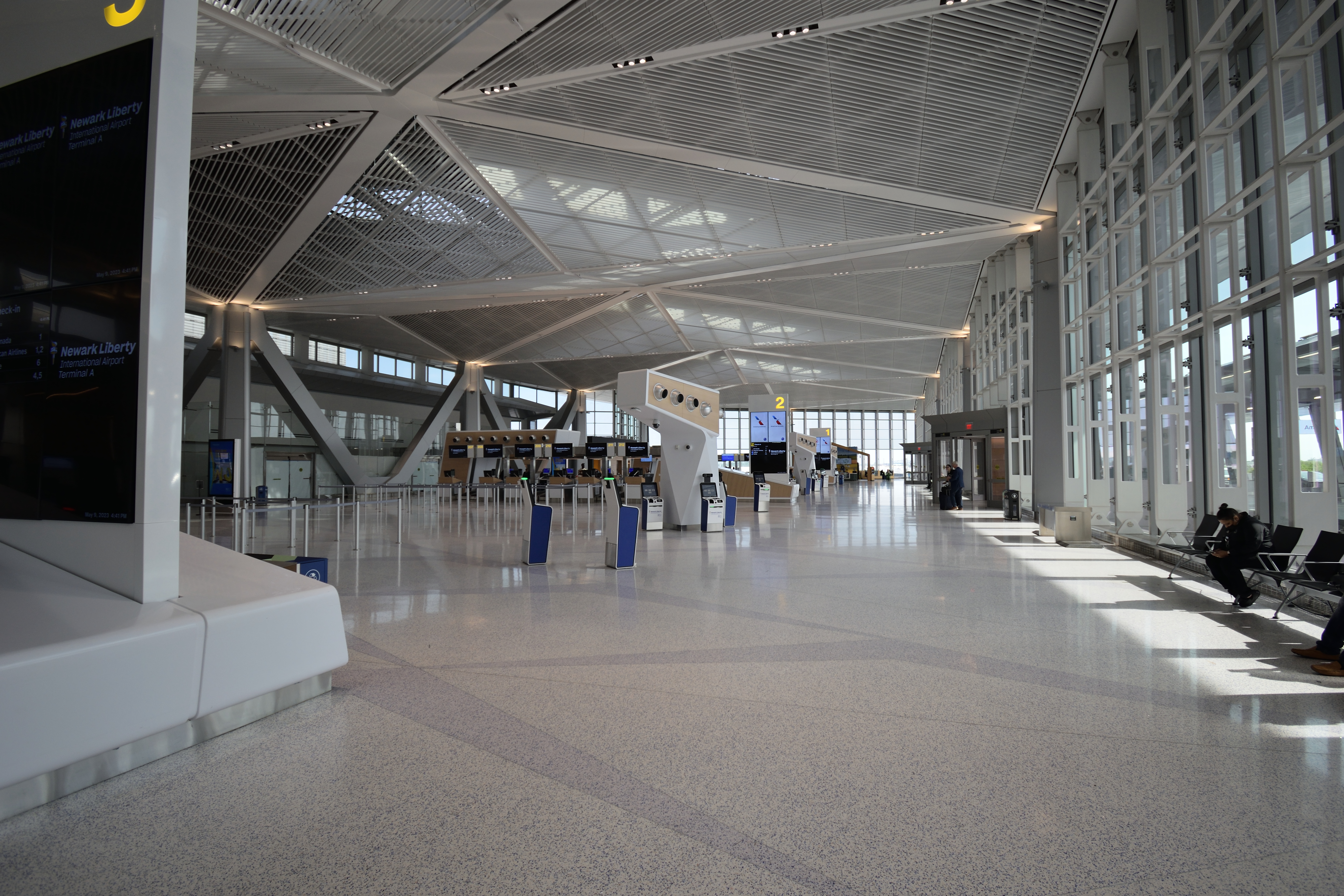
Terminal A check-in area

Designed by Grimshaw Architects, Terminal A references the modern era design of the "modular concrete structures" of the other two terminals through the use of the latest materials that allow for a larger and more light-filled space. The redevelopment offers more traffic lanes at pickup and drop-off points, closer check-in counters and security areas to the entrance, and more gate flexibility to allow planes to park at any gate in a "common-use" system. The new Terminal A has four levels: the departures level, the mezzanine level for offices, the arrivals level, and the ground floor, where baggage claim is located. The terminal is operated as EWR Terminal One LLC by Munich Airport International, a subsidiary of Munich Airport, which manages the terminal's operations, maintenance, and concessions in the 1 million square feet of retail space. The redevelopment also comes with plans to replace the existing AirTrain monorail system, scheduled to open in 2029, and was not opened along with the new Terminal A.

The new Terminal A handles flights by Air Canada, American Airlines, Delta Air Lines, JetBlue (except for international arrivals from non-precleared flights, which are handled at Terminal B), and a minority of United flights not in Terminal C. Multiple technologies in the terminal, such as check-in and security, have been partly automated. The terminal's design has been noted for its use of art from local artists, art on digital columns, a new variety of restaurants and stores, and easy access to power outlets. The terminal was designed to fit New Jersey's "Garden State" (the state's nickname) image. The new terminal also has a designated section for ridesharing company pickups, public transportation, and taxis. On top of the new Terminal A parking garage, the Port Authority built a rooftop canopy of 12,708 solar panels that is the size of six football fields and the largest solar roof at any airport in the United States. In 2023, Terminal A was awarded the special prize for an exterior in the world selection for the 2023 Prix Versailles in the airports category. In 2024, Skytrax awarded Terminal A their prestigious 5-star rating and named it the best new airport terminal in the world. Terminal A is only the second terminal in North America to achieve both awards.

=== Terminal B ===
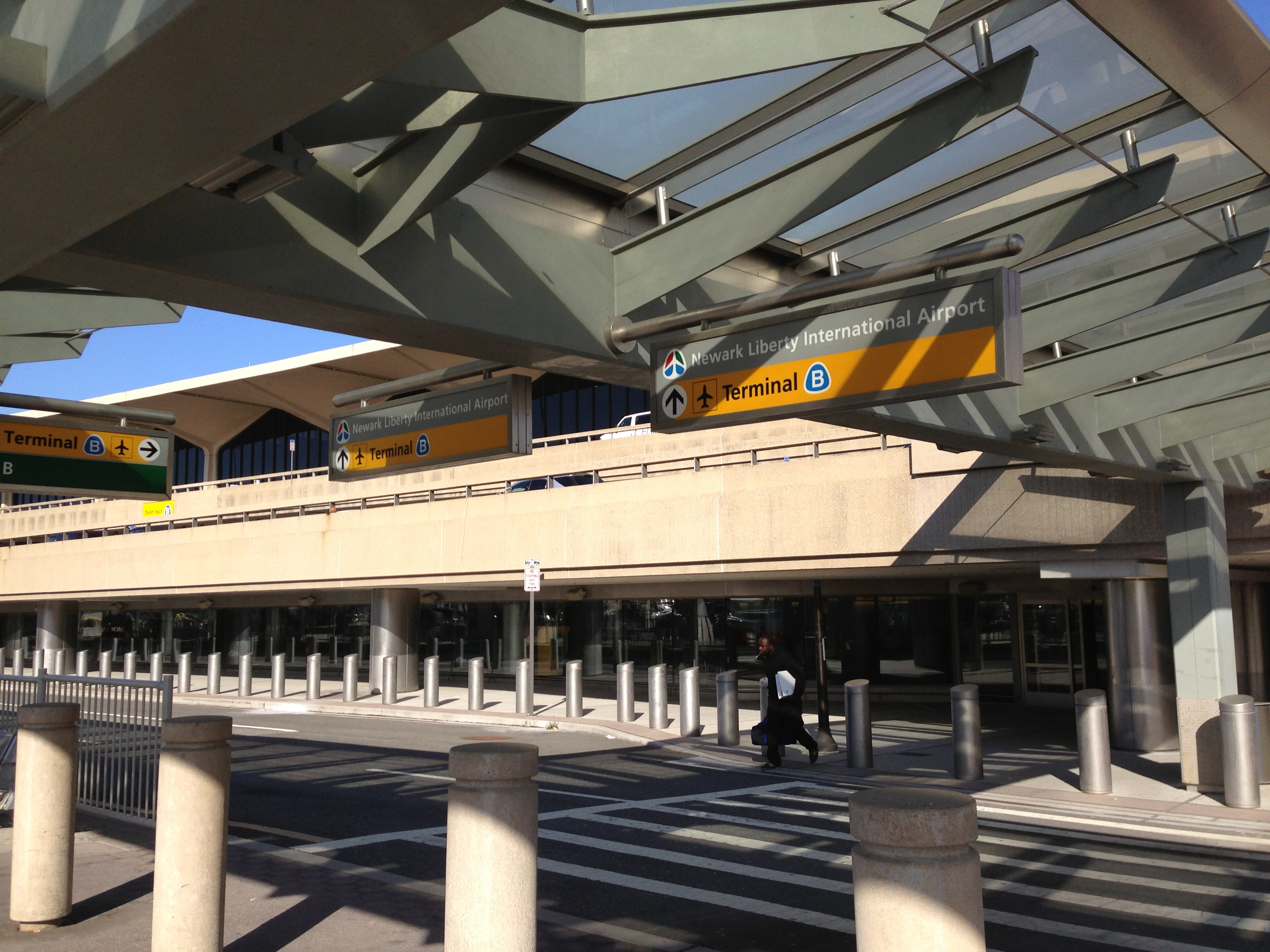
Terminal B viewed from the front of the arrival level

Terminal B, like the original Terminal A, was completed in 1973 and has four levels. Terminal B is the only passenger terminal directly operated by the Port Authority. It handles Alaska Airlines, most foreign carriers, such as British Airways, Lufthansa, and Aer Lingus, ultra-low cost regional operators like Allegiant Air, Frontier Airlines, and Sun Country Airlines, and some of United's international arrivals.

In 1996, a new $120 million international arrival hall opened. The hall is the length of two football fields and features large skylights and windows allowing for natural light and panoramic views of flight activity and the Manhattan skyline. It features 56 immigration booths and seven baggage carousels.

In 2006, Terminal B renovations increased capacity for departing passengers and passenger comfort. The renovations included expanding and updating the ticketing areas, building a new departure level for domestic flights, and building a new arrivals hall. In January 2012, Port Authority executive director Patrick Foye said $350 million would be spent on Terminal B, addressing complaints by passengers that they cannot move freely. The renovations enhanced the terminal's "cathedral-like layout" and made the terminal more cohesive while adding more than 1,000,000 sq ft (93,000 m^{2}) of usable space. Further developments were made to Terminal B when the Port Authority installed new LED fixtures in 2014. The LED fixtures, developed by Sensity Systems, use wireless network capabilities to collect and feed data into the software that can spot long lines, recognize license plates, and identify suspicious activity and alert the appropriate staff. The full renovation of Terminal B was complete by May 2014.

The original Terminal B building is slated for demolition and replacement with new terminal to be constructed landslide.

In 2026, the Port Authority began a three-year $200 million renovation of Terminal B over two phases. The first phase includes refurbishing gate areas, high-traffic circulation spaces, lighting, restrooms along with escalators, elevators and boarding bridges to aircraft. The next phase will include upgrading the terminal HVAC systems and controls and baggage handling systems. The renovations will address needed improvements until a new Terminal B is designed and built.

=== Terminal C ===
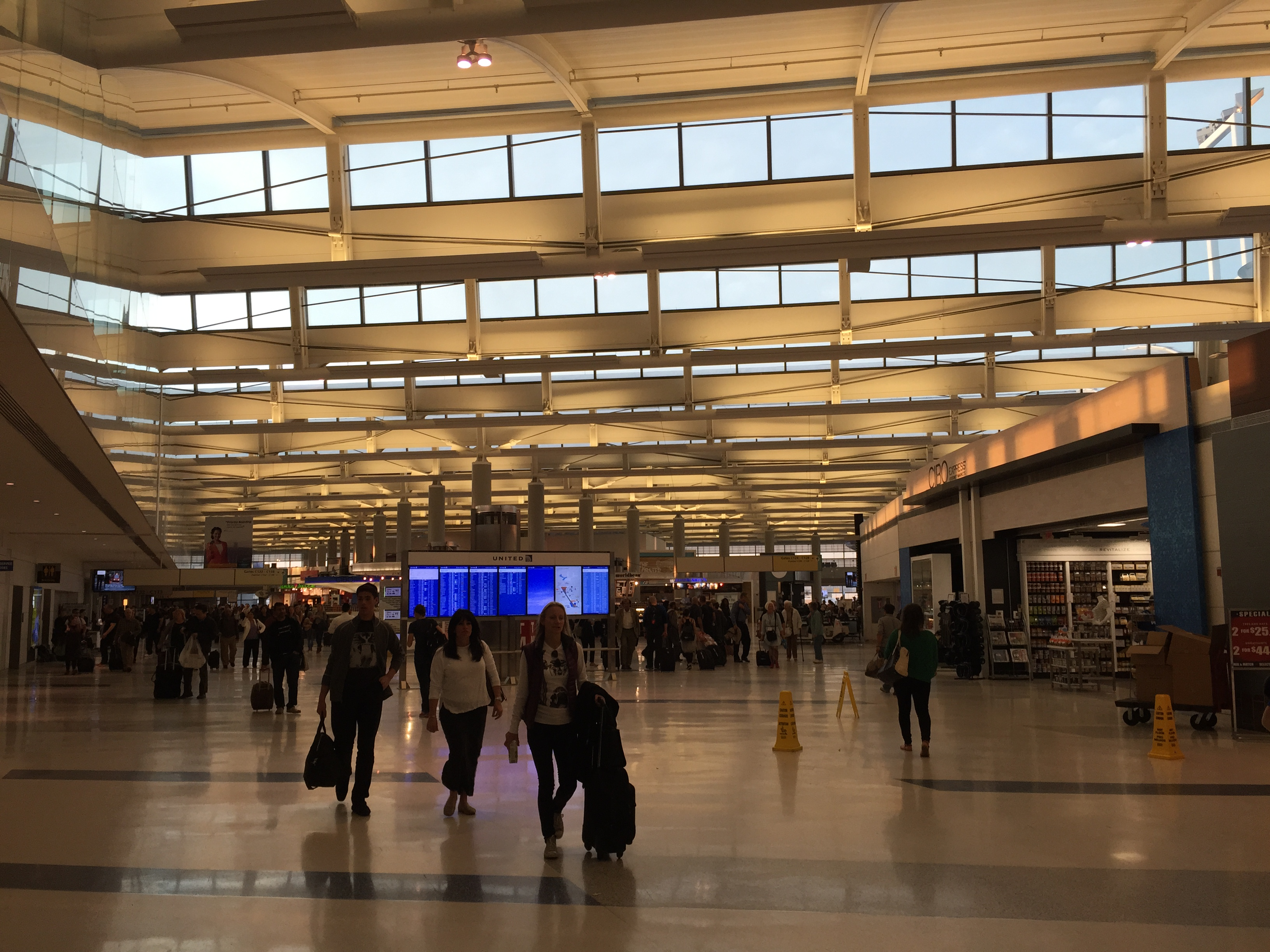
Interior of Terminal C in April 2015

Terminal C, designed by Grad Associates, was completed in 1988. Terminal C is exclusively operated by and for United Airlines and its regional carrier United Express for their global hub. The main terminal building for Terminal C was built alongside Terminals A and B in the 1970s, but lay dormant until People Express Airlines took it over as a replacement for the former North Terminal when the airline's hub there outgrew the old facility.

From 1998 to 2003, Terminal C was rebuilt and expanded in a $1.2 billion program known as the Continental Airlines Global Gateway Project. The project, which was designed by Skidmore, Owings & Merrill, added a 42-position ramp control tower and doubled the available space for outbound travelers as the former baggage claim/arrivals hall was remodeled and turned into a second departures level.

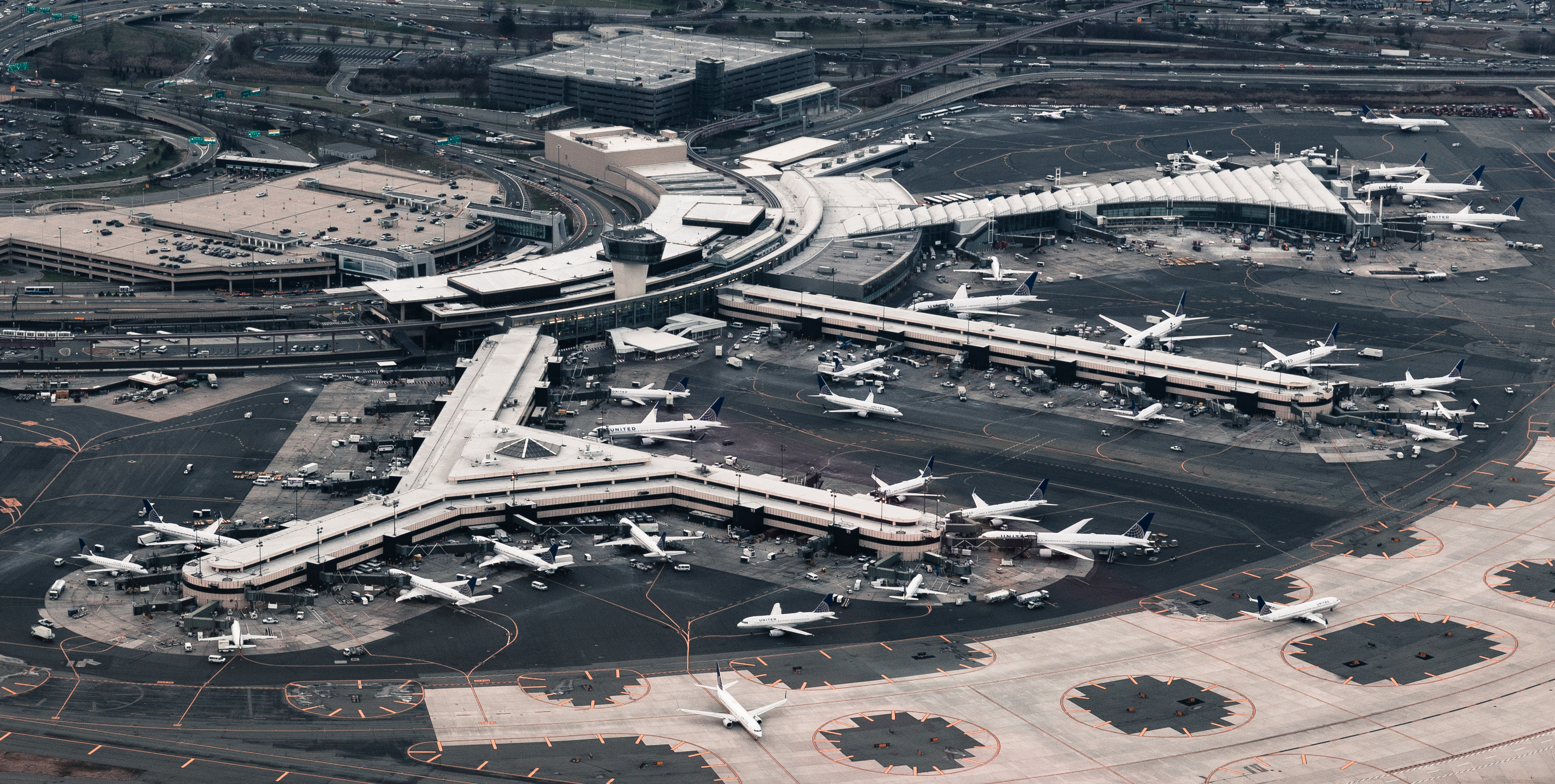
An aerial view of Terminal C in January 2017

International Concourse C-3, a new facility with capacity for a maximum of 19 narrow-body aircraft (or 12 wide-body planes), was added as well. Completion of this new concourse increased Terminal C's mainline jet gates to 57. Accompanying Concourse C-3 was a new international arrivals facility. Also included in the project were an airside corridor connecting Concourses C-1, C-2, and C-3, a President's Club (now United Polaris Lounge) for international business class passengers between C-2 and C-3, and new baggage processing facilities, including reconstruction of the former underground parking area into a new baggage claim and arrivals hall.

In November 2014, airport amenity manager OTG announced a $120 million renovation plan for Terminal C that included installing 6,000 iPads and 55 new restaurants headed by celebrity chefs, with the first new restaurants opening in the summer of 2015 and the whole project completed in 2016. In 2019, Terminal C was named 'Best for Foodies' in the nation by Fodor's Travel Awards.

=== Former terminals ===
==== North Terminal (1953–1997) ====
The North Terminal opened in 1953. Former Terminal A and present Terminal B opened in 1973. However, some charter and international flights requiring customs clearance remained at the North Terminal before the opening of two new terminals. Following significant expansion at EWR, People Express Airlines made a deal with the Port Authority to use the North Terminal as its air terminal and corporate office in 1981 and began operations at Newark that April. When People Express merged with Continental Airlines in 1987, operations at the North Terminal were reduced. In 1997, the North Terminal was closed and demolished, making space for new cargo facilities.

==== Terminal A (1973–2023) ====
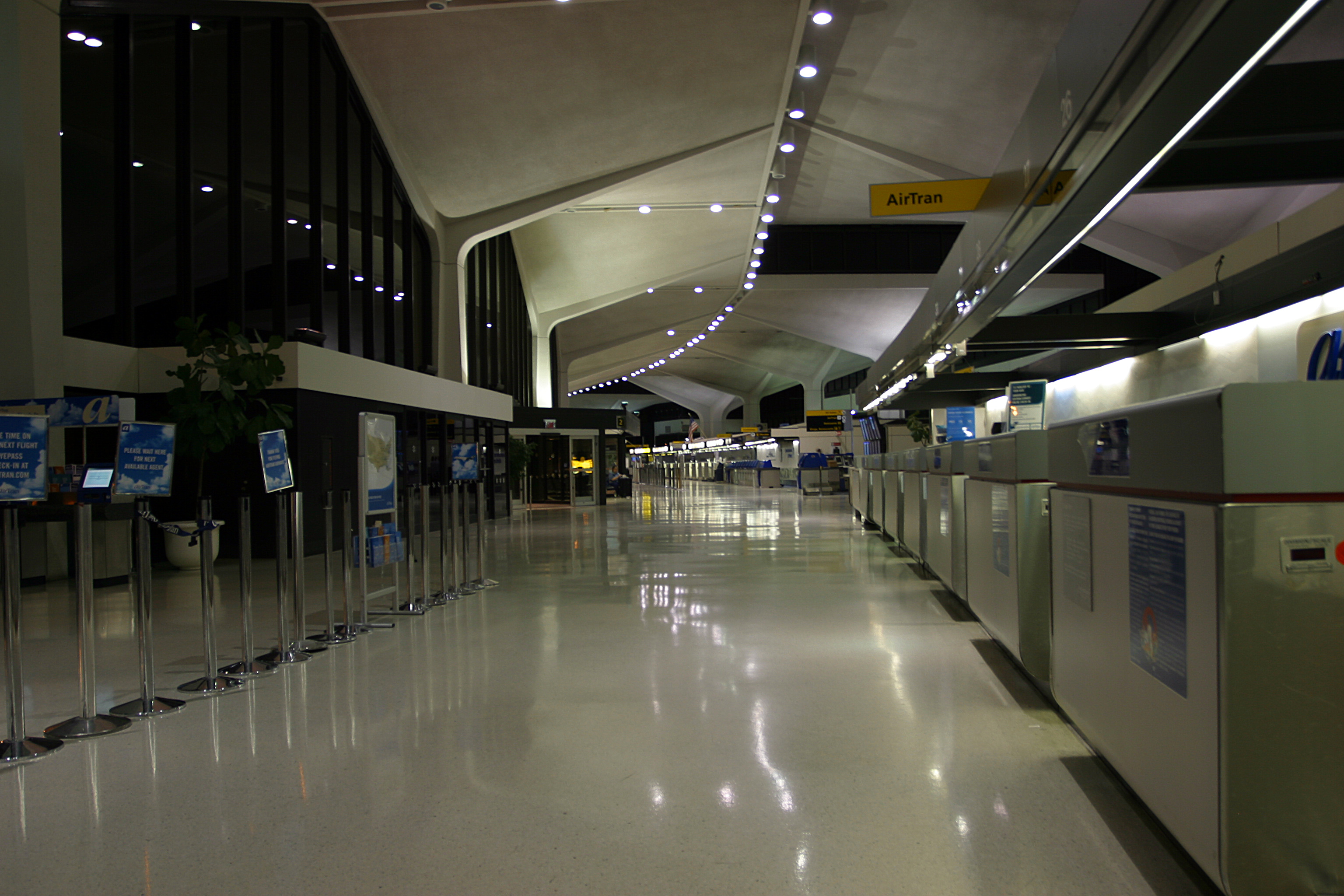
The old Terminal A at night in 2005

The original Terminal A opened in 1973 and was closed on January 12, 2023, when the new Terminal A opened. It was operated by EWR Terminal One LLC, part of Flughafen München GmbH. Terminal A handled only domestic and Canadian flights served by JetBlue (for domestic flights), Air Canada, Air Canada Express, American Airlines, American Eagle; and some United Express flights.

In Terminal A, there was one United Club in Terminal A's second concourse (A2). It also had an Admirals Club for American Airlines and an Air Canada Maple Leaf Lounge. Terminal A was the only terminal that had no immigration facilities; flights arriving from other countries could not use Terminal A without U.S. customs preclearance, although some departing international flights used the terminal. In 2016, the Port Authority approved and announced a redevelopment plan to build a new Terminal A, replacing this one.

Part of Terminal A was closed for demolition on September 30, 2021. The remainder of the former Terminal A was closed to the public, and replaced with the new Terminal A on January 12, 2023. As of late spring, 2024, the majority of the terminal has been demolished, with only the headhouse remaining and being used as the home of the Newark Airport Redevelopment Office.

== Ground transportation ==
=== Rail ===
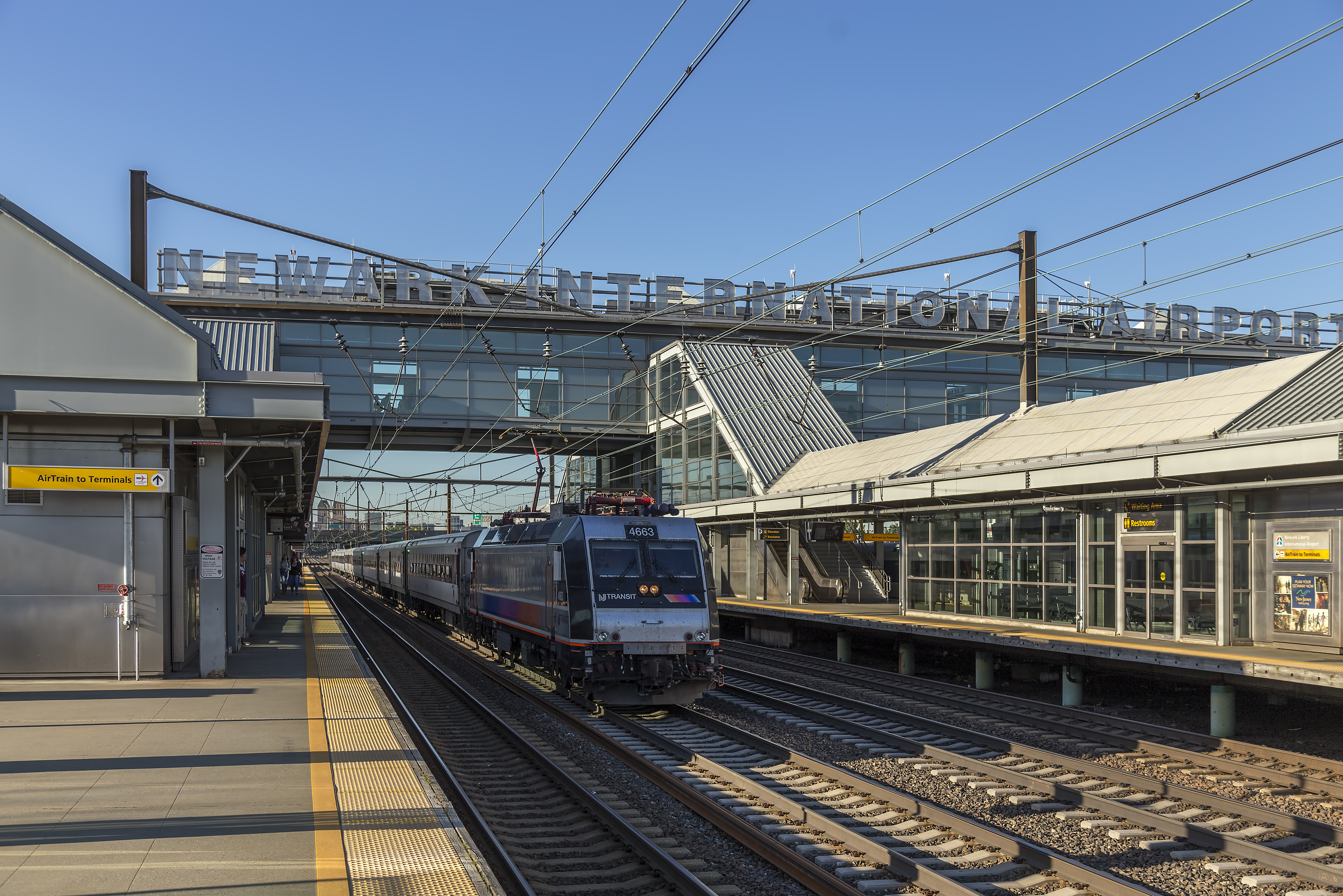
A New Jersey Transit train at Newark Liberty International Airport Station in June 2017

A monorail system, AirTrain Newark, connects the terminals with Newark Liberty International Airport Station. The station is served by New Jersey Transit's Northeast Corridor Line and North Jersey Coast Line, with connections to regional rail hubs such as Newark Penn Station, Secaucus Junction and New York Penn Station where transfers are available to any rail line in northern New Jersey or Long Island, New York. Amtrak's Northeast Regional and Keystone Service trains also stop at the Newark Liberty International Airport station. Passengers can ride the AirTrain for free between the terminals and the parking lots, parking garages, and rental car facilities.

==== Station expansion ====
In September 2012, Port Authority of New York and New Jersey announced commencement of a study to explore extending the PATH system to the station. The new station would be located at ground level to the west of the existing NJ Transit station. In 2014, the Board of Commissioners approved a formal proposal to extend the PATH to Newark Airport. On January 11, 2017, the Port Authority released its 10-year capital plan that included $1.7 billion for the extension. Under the plan, construction was projected to start in 2020, with service in 2026.

In April 2023, plans for the station shifted to prioritize providing access from the station to the surrounding Dayton neighborhood and preliminary design and planning work began. The PATH train extension is "being deferred to a future capital plan" due to a "current funding shortfall." On March 22, 2024, the Port Authority approved the $160 million station expansion project to construct a pedestrian bridge from the station to a plaza off of Frelinghuysen Avenue accessible to pedestrians and cyclists with a drop off area for people coming by car or bus. The project doesn't include an extension of the PATH train but preserves a right of way in case the line is ever extended. The project is scheduled to be completed in 2026.

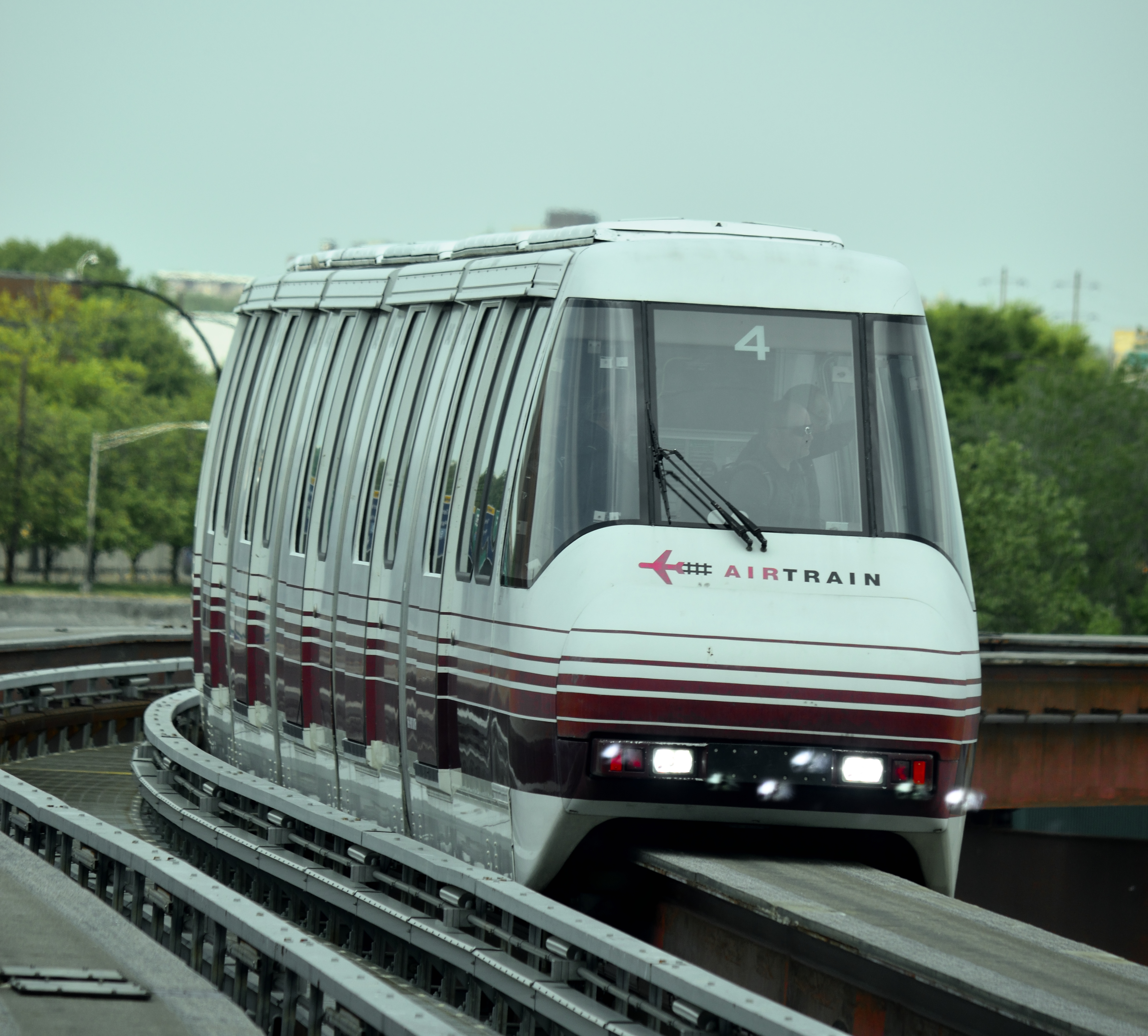
AirTrain Newark approaching Terminal A in May 2023

==== AirTrain replacement ====
In January 2019, New Jersey Governor Phil Murphy announced a plan for a $2 billion replacement project for AirTrain Newark. Murphy stated that replacement is necessary because the system is reaching the end of its projected 25-year life and is subject to persistent delays and breakdowns. The Port Authority would be responsible for funding the project. In October 2019, the Port Authority board approved the replacement project with an estimated cost of $2.05 billion. On May 5, 2021, the Port Authority issued requests for proposals to four teams. In December 2023, the Port Authority announced that the Austrian company Doppelmayr had been awarded the contract to replace the existing train system with a modern cable car system. The contract includes operating costs for 20 years and is close to $1 billion. The new AirTrain is scheduled to open in 2029.

=== Bus ===
==== NJ Transit ====
NJ Transit buses operate northbound local service to Irvington, Downtown Newark and Newark Penn Station, where connections are available to the PATH and NJ Transit rail lines. The go bus 28 is a bus rapid transit line to Downtown Newark, Newark Broad Street Station and Bloomfield Station. Southbound service travels to Elizabeth, Lakewood, Toms River and intermediate points. NJ transit also operates bus routes 37, 62, 67 and 107 to EWR.

==== Olympia Trails ====
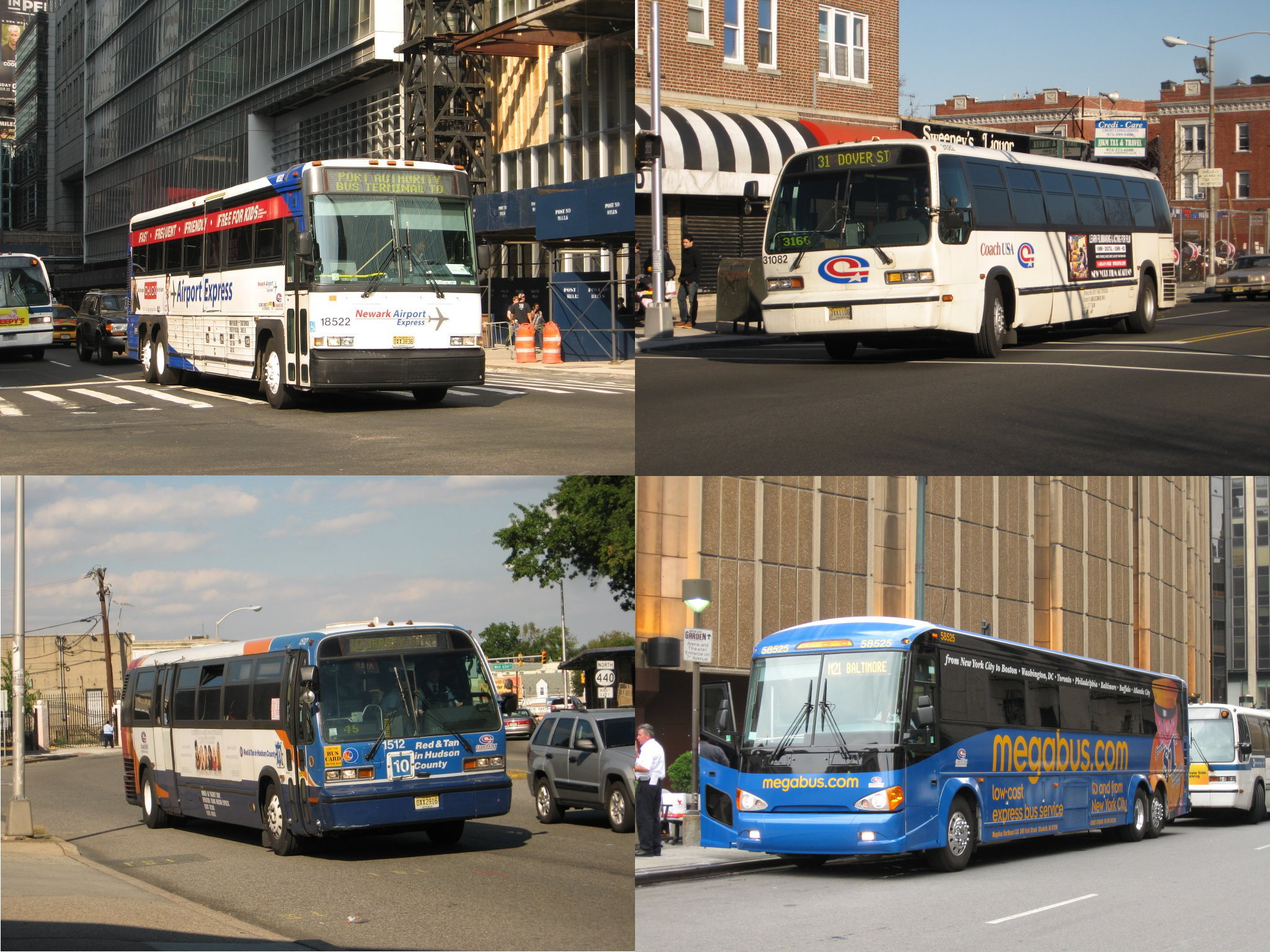
Olympia Trails buses en route to Newark Airport

Olympia Trails operates express buses to the Port Authority Bus Terminal, Bryant Park, and Grand Central Terminal in Manhattan, Super-Shuttle and Go-link operate shared taxi services as GO Airport Shuttle.

==== Trans-Bridge Lines ====
United Airlines' bus service and Trans-Bridge Lines offer shuttles to Lehigh Valley International Airport (ABE) in Hanover Township, Pennsylvania outside Allentown. Continental Airlines (which later merged into United in 2010) previously operated flights from Newark to Allentown, but switched to a bus service in 1995 due to constant delays from air traffic control. As of September 1, 2025, United discontinued their bus service.

Trans-Bridge Lines operates buses to EWR on their Allentown-Clinton-New York City eastbound and westbound route using both ABE and the Allentown Bus Terminal in Allentown, Clinton's Park and Ride, and Port Authority Bus Terminal in Manhattan with several stops in Lehigh and Northampton counties.

=== Road ===
A diagram of the Newark Airport Interchange

Private limousine, car service, and taxis also provide service to/from the airport. For trips to and from New York City, fares are set by the New York City Taxi and Limousine Commission.

The airport is served directly by U.S. Route 1/9, which provides connections to Route 81 and Interstate 78, both of which have interchanges with the New Jersey Turnpike at Interstate 95's exits 13A and 14, respectively. The interchange where U.S. Route 1/9, U.S. Route 22, New Jersey Route 21, Interstate 78, and Interstate 95 meet is known as the Newark Airport Interchange. Northbound, Route 1/9 becomes the Pulaski Skyway, which connects to Route 139. Route 139 continues east to the Holland Tunnel, which links Jersey City with Lower Manhattan.

The airport's northern, eastern, and western perimeters are directly surrounded by Brewster Road, a two-lane road that primarily serves to connect to the North area, South area, Port Authority police, and most parking lots. The airport's official address is 3 Brewster Road.

The airport operates short and long term parking lots with shuttle buses and monorail access to the terminals. The Port Authority's electric shuttle bus fleet comprising 36 buses and 19 chargers, was completed in October 2020 at Newark, John F. Kennedy International, and LaGuardia airports. A free cellphone lot waiting area is available for drivers picking up passengers at the airport. As of 2026, autonomous shuttle buses were being tested at the airport.

== Airlines and destinations ==
=== Passenger ===
Airlines	Destinations	Refs
Aer Lingus	Dublin	
Aeroméxico	Mexico City–Benito Juárez	
Air Canada	Calgary, Toronto–Pearson, Vancouver; Seasonal: Edmonton (begins June 2, 2027)	
Air Canada Express	Halifax, Montréal–Trudeau, Toronto–Pearson	
Air France	Paris–Charles de Gaulle	
Air India	Delhi–Indira Gandhi, Mumbai–Shivaji	
Air Premia	Seoul–Incheon	
Alaska Airlines	Los Angeles, Portland (OR), San Diego, Seattle/Tacoma	
Allegiant Air	Appleton, Asheville, Cincinnati, Des Moines, Destin/Fort Walton Beach, Knoxville; Seasonal: Grand Rapids	
American Airlines	Charlotte, Chicago–O'Hare, Dallas/Fort Worth, Miami, Phoenix–Sky Harbor	
American Eagle	Chicago–O'Hare	
Arajet	Punta Cana, Santo Domingo–Las Américas	
Austrian Airlines	Vienna	
BermudAir	Bermuda; Seasonal: Anguilla, Providenciales (begins December 19, 2026), South Caicos (begins December 20, 2026)	
Breeze Airways	Charleston (WV) (ends January 2, 2027)	
British Airways	London–Heathrow	
Delta Air Lines	Atlanta, Detroit, Los Angeles (begins April 12, 2027), Minneapolis/St. Paul, Salt Lake City	
Delta Connection	Boston, Cincinnati, Raleigh/Durham	
EgyptAir	Cairo	
El Al	Tel Aviv	
Emirates	Athens, Dubai–International	
Ethiopian Airlines	Addis Ababa, Lomé	
French Bee	Paris–Orly	
Frontier Airlines	Atlanta, Orlando, San Juan	
Iberia	Seasonal: Madrid	
Icelandair	Reykjavík–Keflavík	
JetBlue	Fort Lauderdale, Orlando, San Juan, Santiago de los Caballeros, West Palm Beach	
Korean Air	Seoul–Incheon (resumes May 23, 2027)	
La Compagnie	Milan–Malpensa, Nice, Paris–Orly; Seasonal: Düsseldorf (begins April 21, 2027); Seasonal charter: Sint Maarten	
LOT Polish Airlines	Warsaw–Chopin; Seasonal: Kraków, Rzeszów	
Lufthansa	Frankfurt, Munich	
Porter Airlines	Montréal–Trudeau, Ottawa, Toronto–Billy Bishop	
Scandinavian Airlines	Copenhagen, Oslo, Stockholm–Arlanda	
Singapore Airlines	Singapore	
Sun Country Airlines	Minneapolis/St. Paul	
Swiss International Air Lines	Zurich	
TAP Air Portugal	Lisbon, Porto	
Turkish Airlines	Istanbul	
United Airlines	Aguadilla, Amsterdam, Antigua, Aruba, Atlanta, Austin, Barcelona, Barbados, Berlin, Bermuda, Bogotá, Bonaire, Boston, Bozeman, Brussels, Cancún, Cape Town, Charleston (SC), Charlotte, Chicago–O'Hare, Cleveland, Curaçao, Dallas/Fort Worth, Delhi–Indira Gandhi, Denver, Dubai–International (suspended), Dublin, Edinburgh, Fort Lauderdale, Fort Myers, Frankfurt, Geneva, Guatemala City, Houston–Intercontinental, Jacksonville (FL), Johannesburg–O. R. Tambo, Key West, Las Vegas, Lima (ends March 27, 2027), Lisbon, London–Heathrow, Los Angeles, Luxembourg (begins April 2, 2027), Madrid, Mexico City–Benito Juárez, Miami, Milan–Malpensa, Minneapolis/St. Paul, Montego Bay, Munich, Nashville, Nassau, New Orleans, Orange County, Orlando, Panama City–Tocumen, Paris–Charles de Gaulle, Phoenix–Sky Harbor, Portland (OR), Providenciales, Puerto Plata, Puerto Vallarta, Punta Cana, Raleigh/Durham, Rome–Fiumicino, Sacramento, Salt Lake City, San Antonio, San Diego, San Francisco, San José (CR), San José del Cabo, San Juan, San Pedro Sula, San Salvador, Santiago de los Caballeros, Santo Domingo–Las Américas, São Paulo–Guarulhos, Sarasota, Savannah, Seattle/Tacoma, Seoul–Incheon, St. Lucia–Hewanorra, Sint Maarten, St. Thomas, Tampa, Tel Aviv, Tokyo–Haneda, Tokyo–Narita, Washington–Dulles, West Palm Beach, Zurich; Seasonal: Anchorage, Athens, Belize City, Bari, Bilbao, Buffalo, Burlington (VT), Catania (begins May 28, 2027), Detroit, Dominica–Douglas-Charles, Dubrovnik, Eagle/Vail, Faro, Funchal, Glacier Park/Kalispell, Glasgow, Grand Cayman, Hayden/Steamboat Springs, Honolulu, Ibiza (begins May 31, 2027), Jackson Hole, Kansas City, Liberia (CR), Ljubljana (begins May 12, 2027), Málaga, Marrakesh, Marseille (begins June 4, 2027), Montrose, Myrtle Beach, Naples, Nice, Nuuk, Olbia (begins May 27, 2027), Palermo, Palma de Mallorca, Palm Springs, Ponta Delgada, Portland (ME), Porto, Port of Spain, Reykjavík–Keflavík, Santiago de Compostela, Shannon, Split, St. Croix, St. Kitts, St. Louis, Terceira (begins June 9, 2027), Tulum (ends January 2, 2027), Valencia (begins June 2, 2027), Vancouver, Venice	
United Express	Asheville, Bangor, Buffalo, Burlington (VT), Charlotte, Charlottesville (VA), Chattanooga, Cincinnati, Cleveland, Columbia (SC), Columbus–Glenn, Detroit, Fayetteville/Bentonville, Grand Rapids, Greensboro, Greenville/Spartanburg, Halifax, Indianapolis, Key West, Knoxville, Louisville, Madison, Memphis, Milwaukee, Minneapolis/St. Paul, Montréal–Trudeau, Myrtle Beach, Norfolk, Omaha, Ottawa, Pittsburgh, Portland (ME), Québec City, Richmond, Rochester (NY), Savannah, St. Louis, Toronto–Pearson, Washington–Dulles, Washington–National, Wilmington (NC); Seasonal: Atlanta, Boston, Charleston (SC), Hilton Head, Jacksonville (FL), Kansas City, Nantucket, Raleigh/Durham, Traverse City	
Volaris	Guadalajara, Puebla	
Volaris El Salvador	San Salvador	

=== Cargo ===
Airlines	Destinations	Refs
Amerijet International	Orlando, San Juan	
DHL Aviation	Cincinnati	
FedEx Express	Anchorage, Boston, Indianapolis, Los Angeles	
FedEx Feeder operated by Mountain Air Cargo	Baltimore, Boston, Washington–Dulles	
UPS Airlines	Chicago/Rockford, Cologne/Bonn, Dallas/Fort Worth, Louisville, Ontario, Philadelphia	

== Statistics ==
=== Top destinations ===
Busiest domestic routes from EWR (September 2025 – August 2026)
Rank	Airport	Passengers	Carriers
1	Orlando, Florida	959,906	JetBlue, Spirit, United
2	Los Angeles, California	875,687	Alaska, JetBlue, Spirit, United
3	Atlanta, Georgia	869,233	Delta, Frontier, Spirit, United
4	San Francisco, California	865,122	Alaska, United
5	Chicago–O'Hare, Illinois	864,732	American, Spirit, United
6	Fort Lauderdale, Florida	679,915	JetBlue, Spirit, United
7	Miami, Florida	576,907	American, Spirit, United
8	Houston–Intercontinental, Texas	555,003	Spirit, United
9	Denver, Colorado	522,586	United
10	Dallas/Fort Worth, Texas	501,098	JetBlue, Spirit, United

Busiest international routes from EWR (September 2025 – August 2026)
Rank	Airport	Passengers	Carriers
1	London–Heathrow, United Kingdom	982,431	British Airways, United
2	Santo Domingo, Dominican Republic	523,713	Arajet, United
3	Toronto–Pearson, Canada	522,160	Air Canada
4	Paris-Charles de Gaulle, France	502,054	Air France, United
5	Tel Aviv, Israel	469,540	El Al, United
6	Santiago de los Caballeros, Dominican Republic	468,648	JetBlue, United
7	Frankfurt, Germany	442,330	Lufthansa, United
8	Cancún, Mexico	442,251	JetBlue, United
9	Lisbon, Portugal	441,360	TAP Air Portugal, United
10	Punta Cana, Dominican Republic	362,517	Arajet, JetBlue, United

=== Airline market share ===
Carrier shares (September 2025 – August 2026)
1. United, 32,227,281 (69.0%)
2. Delta, 2,012,086 (4.30%)
3. American, 1,979,852 (4.20%)
4. Spirit, 1,737,867 (3.70%)
5. JetBlue, 1,711,076 (3.70%)
6. Other airlines, 7,000,000 (15.0%)

Most used airlines at EWR (September 2025 – August 2026)
Rank	Airline	Passengers	Share
1	United Airlines	32,227,281	69.0%
2	Delta Air Lines	2,012,086	4.3%
3	American Airlines	1,979,852	4.2%
4	Spirit Airlines	1,737,867	3.7%
5	JetBlue	1,711,076	3.7%
-	Other airlines	7,000,000	15.0%

=== Annual traffic ===
Annual passenger traffic at EWR 2000–present
Year	Passengers	Year	Passengers	Year	Passengers
2000	34,451,342	2010	33,309,435	2020	15,950,755
2001	31,054,983	2011	33,819,027	2021	29,169,278
2002	29,323,376	2012	34,187,698	2022	43,491,784
2003	29,531,076	2013	35,187,035	2023	49,153,093
2004	31,997,212	2014	35,515,662	2024	49,127,816
2005	33,113,578	2015	37,485,945	2025	46,965,651
2006	35,808,594	2016	39,881,895	2026	
2007	36,514,591	2017	43,229,806	2027	
2008	35,522,154	2018	45,689,308	2028	
2009	33,510,903	2019	46,386,356	2029	

== Airport information ==
Newark Airport, along with LaGuardia and JFK airports, uses a uniform style of color-coded signage throughout the airport properties, designed by Paul Mijksenaar. Former New York City traffic reporter Bernie Wagenblast provides the voice for the airport's radio station and curbside announcements, as well as the messages heard onboard AirTrain Newark and in its stations. The airport has the IATA airport code EWR, rather than a designation that begins with the letter 'N' because the designator of "NEW" is already assigned to Lakefront Airport in New Orleans. Also, the Department of the Navy uses three-letter identifiers beginning with N for its purposes. In October 2022, the IATA removed Newark from the NYC city code after introducing new global standards for "Multi-Airport Cities."

== Accidents and incidents ==
- On March 17, 1929, a Colonial Airlines Ford Tri-Motor suffered a double engine failure during its initial climb after takeoff, failed to gain height, and crashed into a railroad freight car loaded with sand, killing 14 of the 15 people on board. At the time, it was the deadliest aviation accident in American history.
- On January 14, 1933, Eastern Air Transport, a Curtiss Condor, crashed at Newark; two crewmembers were killed.
- On May 4, 1947, Union Southern Airlines, a Douglas DC-3 with 12 passengers and crew, crashed on landing at Newark after overrunning the runway and into a ditch where it burned. Two crewmembers were killed.
- On December 16, 1951, a Miami Airlines C-46 Commando (converted for passenger use) lost a cylinder on takeoff from Runway 28 and crashed in Elizabeth, killing 56.
- On January 22, 1952, American Airlines Flight 6780, a Convair 240, crashed in Elizabeth on approach to Runway 6, killing 30.
- On February 11, 1952, National Airlines Flight 101, a Douglas DC-6, crashed in Elizabeth after takeoff from Runway 24, killing 33.
- On April 18, 1979, a New York Airways commuter helicopter on a routine flight to LaGuardia Airport and John F. Kennedy International Airport plunged 150 feet (46 m) into the area between Runways 4L/22R and 4R/22L, killing three passengers and injuring 15. It was later determined the crash was due to a failure in the helicopter's tail rotor.
- On March 30, 1983, a Learjet 23 operated by Hughes Charter Air, a night check courier flight, crashed on landing at EWR during an unstabilized approach. Both crewmembers were killed. Marijuana was later found in their systems, believed to have impaired judgement.
- On July 31, 1997, FedEx Flight 14, a McDonnell Douglas MD-11, crashed while landing after a flight from Anchorage International Airport. The Number 3 engine contacted the runway during a rough landing, which caused the aircraft to flip upside down. The aircraft was destroyed by fire. The two crewmembers and three passengers escaped uninjured.
- On May 3, 2026, United Airlines Flight 169, a Boeing 767-400, struck a light pole while on final approach over the New Jersey Turnpike, causing damage to a tractor-trailer and a traffic collision which resulted in a minor injury. The aircraft landed safely.

== See also ==
- New Jersey World War II Army Airfields
