= Newark Metropolitan Airport Buildings =

- U.S. National Register of Historic Places
- New Jersey Register of Historic Places
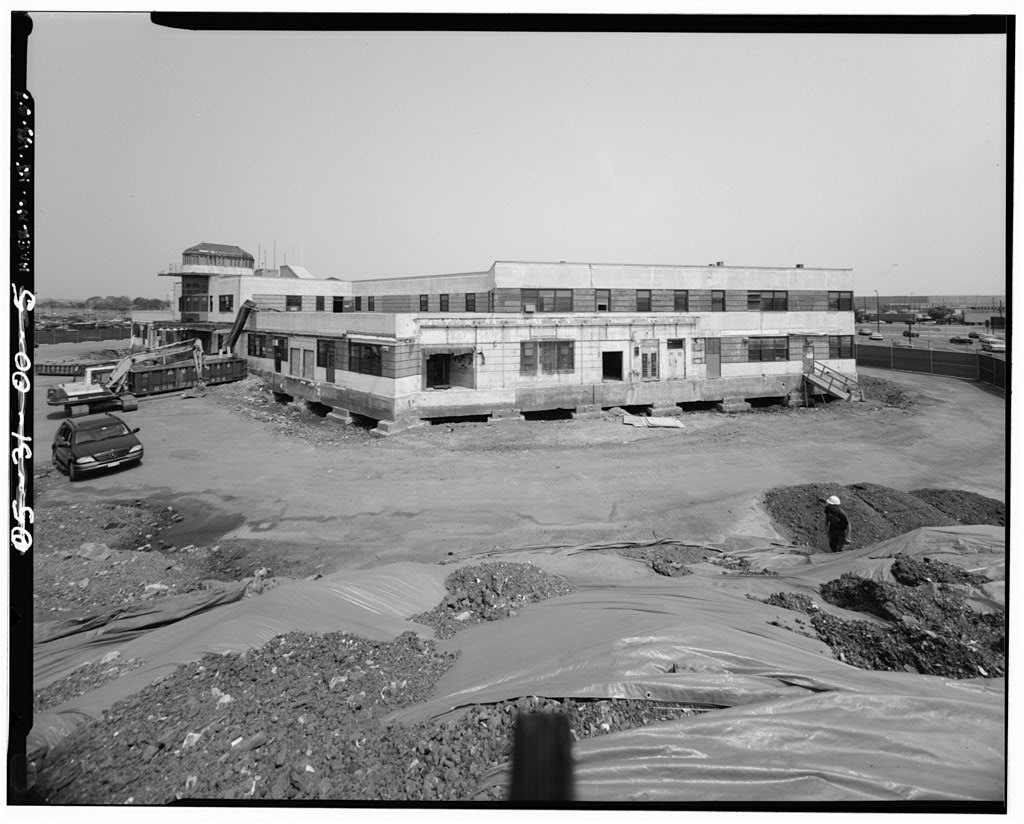
- Administration Building during relocation

- Location within Essex County, New Jersey Location within New Jersey Location within the United States
- Location: U.S. 22, Newark, New Jersey
- Coordinates: 40°42′17″N 74°10′12″W
- Area: 5 acres (2.0 ha)
- Built: 1934
- Architectural style: Art Deco
- NRHP reference No.: 80002485
- NJRHP No.: 1295

Significant dates
- Added to NRHP: December 12, 1980
- Designated NJRHP: June 25, 1980

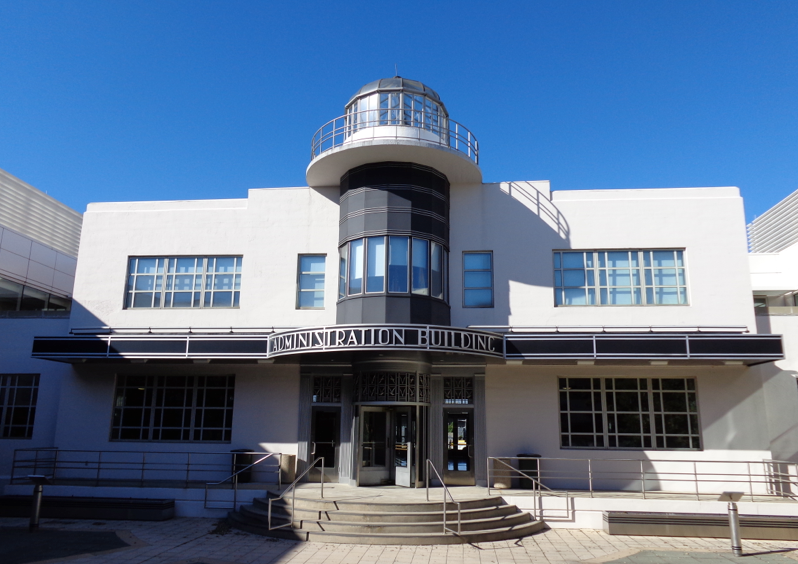

The Newark Metropolitan Airport Buildings are at Newark Liberty International Airport in Newark, New Jersey. Newark Metropolitan, opened in 1928, was the first major airport in the United States. The trio of Art Deco buildings, the Administration Building, Brewster Hangar and the Medical Building, were built in 1934 and dedicated by Amelia Earhart in 1935. They were added to state and federal registers of historic places in 1980. In 2001, the Administration Building was relocated when a runway was lengthened, and they have subsequently been renovated. The terminal was once adorned with murals by Arshile Gorky, only two of which survive and are part of the Newark Museum collection.

== See also ==
- National Register of Historic Places listings in Essex County, New Jersey
