= List of killings by law enforcement officers in the United States, December 2014 =

This is a list of people reported killed by non-military law enforcement officers in the United States in December 2014, whether in the line of duty or not, and regardless of reason or method. The listing documents the occurrence of a death, making no implications regarding wrongdoing or justification on the part of the person killed or officer involved. Killings are arranged by date of the incident that caused death. Different death dates, if known, are noted in the description. The table below lists 91 people.

== December 2014 ==
| Date | Name (Age) of Deceased | Race | State (City) | Description |
|---|---|---|---|---|
| 2014-12-31 | Eric Tyrone Forbes (28) | | Florida (Miami) | An armed robbery suspect was shot and killed by Miramar police officers after a chase into Liberty City. Two Miramar officers are relieved of duty with pay; standard with Miami police shootings. |
| 2014-12-31 | Joseph Anthony Pacini (52) | White | Pennsylvania (Upper Darby Township) | Five officers – two from Upper Darby, two from Clifton Heights and one from Haverford – fired their service weapons, killing a man with mental illness who made threats against them on YouTube. According to police, he tried to run them over with his car. "The car was smoldering," said a bystander. |
| 2014-12-31 | Kaileb Cole Williams (20) | White | Montana (Missoula) | A intoxicated man killed by a Missoula police officer was allegedly strangling his girlfriend in a car before the officer fired the lethal shot. "He was non-compliant with the officers' instructions and negotiation efforts," a spokesperson said. |
| 2014-12-31 | Ernest Lee Erwin (48) | White | Kentucky (Olive Hill) | According to a press release, Kentucky State Police responded to a domestic violence call shot and killed a man after he shot at them. |
| 2014-12-31 | Mayra Cornejo (34) | Hispanic | California (Compton) | A woman pointing a gun at the father of her children when Los Angeles County Sheriff's deputies arrived. "Deputies gave the female several commands to drop the gun, however she did not comply. Fearing for the safety of the victim, that the female suspect would shoot and kill him, deputies fired at the female suspect striking her." The woman was transported to a hospital and pronounced dead. |
| 2014-12-31 | Kevin Davis (44) | Black | Georgia (Decatur) | |
| 2014-12-30 | Robert Earl Lawrence (30) | White | Alabama (Dothan) | |
| 2014-12-30 | Jerame C. Reid (36) | Black | New Jersey (Bridgeton) | Two officers shot and killed Jerame Reid during a traffic stop. Reid exited the car, apparently with his hands raised, before the officers opened fire. |
| 2014-12-29 | Timothy Edward West (48) | White | Florida (St. Augustine) | |
| 2014-12-29 | Robert Battaglia (28) | White | California (Paradise) | The deceased's mother called 911 for help with her son who had a long history of mental illness. When Butte County deputies arrived they say Battaglia stabbed one before the other shot and killed him. |
| 2014-12-28 | David Andre Scott (28) | Black | Florida (Jacksonville) | Jacksonville Sheriff's SWAT team shot and killed a murder suspect outside his sister's apartment. "They saw him hold the object like a gun, pointed it like a gun and was shot 21 times, and struck him in the torso and extremities," said a sheriff's department spokesperson. Investigators say the object was a box stuffed in a black sock. |
| 2014-12-27 | McCloskey, Matt (10) | | New Jersey (Franklin Township, Gloucester County) | Franklin Township police officer Nicholas Locilento hit and killed McCloskey who was crossing a street with another child and two adults. Locilento's cruiser lights and sirens were not turned on. |
| 2014-12-27 | Nicholas McGehee (28) | White | Utah (Stansbury Park) | The deceased's wife called for help with a medical emergency. Police spotted McGehee carrying a shotgun. They confronted him and he pointed a handgun at them. They shot and killed McGehee, a military recruiter. |
| 2014-12-27 | Darren Robert Kindgren (51) | White | Alabama (Holly Pond) | A Cullman County sheriff's deputy responding to a distress call for a suicidal man shot and killed him. Police say the deceased had a 3-foot sword. |
| 2014-12-27 | Daniel Gray (51) | Unknown race | Arizona (Dewey) | A Yavapai County Sheriff's officer shot and killed a suicidal man at a Prescott Country Club residence. A statement released to the media said the man pointed a handgun at deputies. |
| 2014-12-27 | Schiffer, Craig (54) | | New York (East Islip) | Two Suffolk County Sheriff's deputies responding to an emergency call on Long Island struck a pedestrian who later died. |
| 2014-12-26 | John Hebebrand (43) | White | Ohio (Bedford) | Hebebrand's girlfriend called Bedford police for assistance, "My boyfriend came home drunk, and he's destroying the whole living room. I need police here now." Hebebrand told officers he had a gun and was Taser'd. Officers say he then lunged at them with a knife so they shot and killed him. Media reports Hebebrand had multiple convictions for violence against police. |
| 2014-12-26 | Quentin Smith (23) | Black | Florida (Cocoa) | A Brevard County Sheriff's deputy Richard Clements shot and killed Smith who had shot up his brother's apartment on Christmas Day. Clements told fellow officers Smith had threatened him with a gun. Sheriff Wayne Ivey said, "This is someone who had indicated a suicide by cop concept. I perceive this as totally unrelated to anything else we see goin on in the country." |
| 2014-12-26 | Carlton Wayne Smith (20) | Black | Texas (Texas City) | A Texas City officer shot and killed Carlton Wayne "Chimmy" Smith who the officer said was firing a gun in a night club parking lot and at people leaving the club. Police say the deceased aimed the weapon at the officer, who then shot and killed him. After the shooting, a crowd gathered and reportedly started throwing bottles and rocks at the officers. Friends and relatives told the media Smith had taken the gun away from another person, who had been shooting into the air, and did not aim it at the officer. |
| 2014-12-26 | Gilbert, Terrence (25) | Black | Illinois (Chicago) | Two police officers shot and killed a suicidal man when he charged at them with a knife. Earlier, when confronted, the deceased had stabbed and injured a third officer. |
| 2014-12-25 | Cesena, Francisco (40) | Hispanic | California (San Diego) | After being tasered by a US Border Inspector, a US citizen who was crossing the border into the US from Mexico on foot, died. Police say Cesena jumped over a counter and attacked a border agent. During the fight, Cesena was tasered. |
| 2014-12-25 | Rodriguez, Omar (39) | Hispanic | California (Coachella) | Riverside County Sheriff's spokesperson said a female officer shot and killed Rodriguez after he tried to take the deputy's baton. He was identified by the spokesperson as a "suspicious person." |
| 2014-12-24 | Ned Womack (47) | White | Jasper, GA | |
| 2014-12-24 | Khamis Shatara (21) | White | Florida (Palm Beach) | An off-duty Palm Beach County sheriff's deputy was arrested by Delray Beach police after a shooting and killing his son after a dispute. |
| 2014-12-24 | Gregory Marcus Gray (33) | Black | District of Columbia (Washington) | District officers fatally shot a man suspected in a robbery at after the man reportedly pulled a gun on police who were pursuing him. Police initially misidentified Gray as Raymond Robinson, age 29. |
| 2014-12-24 | Jenkins, Robert (55) | Unknown | Oregon (Reedsport) | Jenkins' Subaru was pulled over on a rural highway and on fire. An Oregon Department of Justice investigator who was not on duty stopped to assist, as did Reedsport police and Douglas County deputies shortly thereafter. A Reedsport officer shot Jenkins and he died later in the day at Lower Umpqua Hospital. |
| 2014-12-24 | Martin, Antonio (18) | Black | Missouri (Berkeley) | Police shot and killed Martin after he allegedly pointed a gun at them outside of a gas station in Berkeley, just two miles from Ferguson, Missouri. |
| 2014-12-24 | Nicholas Tyson Frazier (28) | White | Montana (Deer Lodge) | A Deer Lodge police officer shot and killed a suicidal man after he pointed a gun at officers who were confronting him. |
| 2014-12-22 | Austin Leake (20) | White | Georgia (DeKalb County) | A suicidal man confronted by the DeKalb County SWAT team began shooting at officers. They returned fire and killed him. |
| 2014-12-22 | Salas, Jose (29) | Hispanic | New Mexico (Las Cruces) | Las Cruces police chased Salas into a wide drainage ditch then spent two hours trying to get him out using tear gas. When he emerged, police say he brandished a gun and was then shot and killed by officers. |
| 2014-12-22 | Allen Berly Todd Jr. (27) | White | Kentucky (Independence) | Police say a robbery suspect resisted arrest after a car chase and was killed by officers. "The subject was apprehended for a short period of time. At that point was when the subject did not reply to verbal commands," a Kentucky State Patrol spokesperson said. "At that point the subject was shot and pronounced deceased at that point." |
| 2014-12-22 | James Arlen Monroe Jr. (61) | Unknown race | Florida (Lakeland) | A man who had exhibited signs of mental illness including psychosis and suicidal ideation was shot and killed by Lakeland police at the end of a five-hour standoff. "Jim was crazy," said Monroe's step-daughter. "It (the shooting) comes as a shock because he talked about how much he loved her, but I never thought he'd harm her." |
| 2014-12-21 | James Long (52) | White | Delaware (Dover) | A man with a long history of mental illness was shot to death by police, just hours after telling a state-run crisis hotline operator that he planned to commit "suicide by cop." The operator sent police officers to his home. |
| 2014-12-21 | William Everett Corson (53) | White | California (Auburn) | Placer County Sheriff's spokesperson say Corson shot over 100 rounds from his home and set a garage on fire. After a five-hour stand off, deputies shot and killed him. |
| 2014-12-20 | Allen Locke (30) | Native American | South Dakota (Rapid City) | Rapid City Police officer Anthony Meirose shot Locke over five times, killing him. A police spokesperson said Locke charged at the officer with a knife inside an apartment. |
| 2014-12-19 | Bohatch, Andrew (59) | | Pennsylvania (Perryopolis) | Bohatch was killed after a collision with Perryopolis officer Richard Champion who was speeding on Route 51 with lights and sirens on. Officer Champion died at the scene. |
| 2014-12-19 | Vitug, Joanna | | Northern Mariana Islands (Saipan) | Officer Christropher Santos shot his girlfriend Joanna Vitug to death and then committed suicide. The shooting occurred when he was on duty. |
| 2014-12-18 | Richard Fredrick Tis Mil Estrada (17) | Native American | California (Willow Creek) | A California Highway Patrol officer, Tim Gray, was investigating a car accident on Highway 299 in rural Humboldt County, and was attacked by the driver with a machete, Richard Frederick Tis Mil Estrada. Gray received serious wounds to his arm, face, and hand, and then shot Estrada at least once. A second CHP officer arrived to the scene several minutes later and attempted to handcuff Estrada but he resisted arrest and was then Tasered. Two good Samaritans also assisted in helping handcuff Estrada. He quickly died from the gunshot wounds. |
| 2014-12-18 | Sandra Simpson (32) | Hispanic | Texas (Midland) | Sgt. Chad Simpson shot and killed his wife Sandra and then himself. They left behind two toddlers. |
| 2014-12-18 | Simpson, Chad (34) | | Texas (Midland) | See Sandra Simpson, above. |
| 2014-12-18 | Brent Kyle Krout (39) | White | Indiana (Zionsville) | After a highway car chase and a long negotiation, an Indiana State Trooper shot and killed a suspect. After eight hours, Krout exited his car and "took a defensive stance and pointed his weapon at officers" said a State police spokesperson. |
| 2014-12-18 | Joshua G. Dawson (35) | White | Arizona (Phoenix) | Phoenix officers responded to a 911 call for help about a man throwing rocks. They report the man threw knives at them before they shot and killed him. |
| 2014-12-17 | Johnathon Dean (JD) Mar (18) | White | Minnesota (Shoreview) | A Kennewick Washington high school student was shot and killed by officers from Hennepin County and Brooklyn Center Police after a highway car chase. They report Mar "brandished" a gun before they shot him. Mar is suspected of a rest stop killing hours before. |
| 2014-12-17 | Julius L. Pinson (48) | White | California (Costa Mesa) | Two Costa Mesa police officers, serving a warrant, exchanged gunfire with Pinson, killing him. |
| 2014-12-17 | Adam Padilla (34) | Hispanic | New Mexico (Albuquerque) | A Bernalillo County Sheriff's deputy shot and killed Padilla after a roadside struggle. Padilla' girlfriend told media they had been pulled over for an expired auto registration. |
| 2014-12-17 | Unidentified (21) | | Washington (Tacoma) | Pierce County sheriff's deputies shot and killed a homicide suspect after he allegedly pulled a gun and fired a shot when the deputies confronted him. |
| 2014-12-17 | Henry Castoreno (48) | Hispanic | Texas (San Antionio) | Shot after a confrontation which ended with a fatal hit and run |
| 2014-12-16 | William R. Osterlind (18) | White | Arizona (Phoenix) | A teen experiencing a mental health crisis and armed with a handgun was shot and killed by a Phoenix police sharpshooter after an extended standoff when he attempted to enter a private home. |
| 2014-12-16 | Andrew Jay Worsfold (25) | White | Iowa (Marshalltown) | Marshalltown Officers Ramon Maxey and Benjamin Scheevel encountered Worsfold, who they said was armed with a handgun. No other reason for the shooting was reported in the media. |
| 2014-12-15 | Cody Robert Healey (28) | White | Florida (Pensacola) | On December 1, two Escambia County Sheriff's deputies used their Tasers on a 130-pound man in a mental health crisis five times until he lost consciousness. His family took him off life support two weeks later. |
| 2014-12-15 | Morrow, Valerie (40) | | Pennsylvania (Glenolden) | A Delaware County deputy, Stephen Rozniakowski, kicked down the door to Morrow's home, ran up the stairs and shot her, authorities said. Morrow's husband shot and wounded Rozniakowski, who also wounded Morrow's teen daughter. Morrow and Rozniakowski had dated when the Morrows were estranged. |
| 2014-12-15 | Xavier McDonald (16) | Black | Tennessee (Nashville) | A 16-year-old robbery suspect locked himself in an apartment bathroom. An officer persuaded McDonald to come out then felt a gun as she patted him down. Another officer tried to Taser McDonald, and McDonald opened fire, hitting a third officer in the leg. Four other officers shot back, killing McDonald. |
| 2014-12-15 | Michael D. Sulton (23) | Black | Mississippi (Ridgeland) | A Ridgeland Police officer shot and killed Sutton who police say was suspected of a carjacking and shot at officers. |
| 2014-12-15 | Dennis Grisgby (35) | Black | Texas (Texarkana) | A Texarkana police officer shot and killed Grigsby who was holding a spoon. Witnesses inside a home told 911 officers Grisby had been beating on a window. |
| 2014-12-14 | Daniel Torres (51) | Hispanic | Florida (St. Johns County) | A woman called 911 claiming her estranged husband, who did not live at the home, was trying to force his way in. Deputies say Torres cut a window screen with a knife, opened a window, and leaned inside while yelling at another woman inside the home. That woman called Torres' wife who wasn't home at the time, and she called 911. The other woman left out the back with two kids. Responding deputies approached Torres on foot and he turned toward them, still holding the knife. He refused to comply with their orders and was fatally shot by deputy Christina Dobbs. |
| 2014-12-14 | Brandon Tate Brown (26) | Black | Pennsylvania (Philadelphia) | Two rookie officers say Tate-Brown reached for a gun in his car as they tried to struggled with him. They stopped Tate-Brown for not having his headlights on. |
| 2014-12-13 | Charles Gluchacki (65) | Unknown race | California (Perris) | A Riverside County Sheriff's deputy shot and killed a burglary suspect. |
| 2014-12-13 | Logan Patrick Hall (22) | White | Ohio (Mt. Vernon) | Mount Vernon police shot and killed a person after a report of a domestic dispute, a police spokesperson said. |
| 2014-12-12 | Michael Rodriguez (19) | Hispanic | Kansas (Topeka) | Witnesses told local media Topeka police officers obliged a resident who pointed a gun at them and screamed, "someone please kill me, please." The witness continued, "I could see the look in his eye. You could tell he was just a frustrated, poor, you know, kid in the ghetto." |
| 2014-12-12 | Randall Gordon (27) | Unknown race | Tennessee (Sevierville) | Sevierville officers responding to a domestic dispute confronted Gordon who was intoxicated. Officer Adam Akers shot Randall Gorden, 27, after Gorden pointed a pistol at the officers. A police spokesperson said Akers and other department members would pray for the Gordon family. |
| 2014-12-12 | Thurrell Jowers (22) | Black | Missouri (Poplar Bluff) | A Poplar Bluff Police shot and killed Jowers. A Missouri State Highway Patrol spokesperson described Jowers stabbed an unidentified person with a knife and "charged at the officers with the knife." |
| 2014-12-12 | Anthony Landi (27) | White | Florida (Palm Beach Gardens) | Officers were called to the scene because a witness said Landi had a gun. Officers say Landi pointed the gun at them prior to their shooting and killing him. |
| 2014-12-10 | Thomas Edward Brazeail (38) | White | California (Wildomar) | A Riverside County sheriff's deputy shot and killed a suspected car thief after a car chase. |
| 2014-12-10 | Brandon Atencio (28) | White | Colorado (Cañon City) | Police say Atencio charged at them after a short foot chase. They shot and killed him. |
| 2014-12-10 | Travis Faison (24) | Black | North Carolina (Sanford) | Faison's cousin told media, "The police was knocking at the door to serve him with a warrant. My brother was on the phone and heard all of this. A scuffle went on I guess and a gunshot went off and my cousin was shot and killed." Police say they were serving a warrant. |
| 2014-12-10 | Randall Minier Jr. (27) | Hispanic | Michigan (Lansing Township) | Lansing Township police officer shot and killed Minier during a traffic stop. A state police investigator said Minier "displayed a gun to the officers." |
| 2014-12-10 | Lee, Franklin (58) | | Georgia (Cairo) | Lee was pepper-sprayed, arrested for public intoxication and taken to Cairo County Jail. He died some hours later; Georgia Bureau of Investigations has the case. "I've watched a video where he is put in hand cuffs with his hands behind his back, I mean put in hand cuffs and I don't see any resistance at all. I want to know what happened outside of those doors after that," said his niece Tabitha Whitfield. |
| 2014-12-09 | Degutis, Thomas (78) | | Maryland (Middle River) | An eight-year veteran of the Essex Precinct identified as Officer Ruth hit and killed Degutis at an intersection during a hit-and-run chase. Degutis was not involved in the hit-and-run call, police said. |
| 2014-12-09 | John Laco (84) | White | Indiana (Lake Station) | Eighty-four-year-old John Laco was sitting in his car in the parking lot of Lake Station, Indiana city hall with a 16-gauge shotgun. Police arrived and ordered him to drop the shotgun, Laco then got out of the car, pointed the shotgun at the officers, and fired. Officers immediately returned fire killing the man. |
| 2014-12-09 | Joshua David Merritt (32) | Hispanic | Florida (Yulee) | Nassau County Sheriff's deputies returning fire shot and killed Merritt, authorities said. A neighbor's 911 call said Merritt was firing a rifle near their home. |
| 2014-12-08 | Calvin Peters (49) | Black | New York (New York City) | A man barged into the Chabad-Lubavitch Hasidic synagogue with a knife, yelled "kill all the Jews!" and stabbed and injured a student. NYPD officers arrived to the scene and demanded Peters to drop his knife. Peters dropped the knife but picked it up and then charged at officers. An officer fired one shot in Peters' torso. Peters was taken to a hospital where he was pronounced dead. According to police, Peters had an extensive history of mental illness. |
| 2014-12-08 | Christopher Bernard Doss (31) | Black | Texas (San Antonio) | Members of the U.S. Marshals Lone Star Fugitive Task Force attempted to arrest Doss for murder. When he reached for his gun, a sheriff's deputy shot and killed him. |
| 2014-12-07 | Guadalupe Ochoa-Manzo (27) | Hispanic | California (Oakland) | Ochoa was attempted to be pulled over by police for suspicion of driving a stolen truck. She refused to pull over and lead San Leandro Police Department officers on a chase that ended in East Oakland. Ochoa allegedly rammed several police cars near a cul-de-sac and officers responded by shooting the woman. She died two days later at a hospital. |
| 2014-12-07 | Jerry Demonte Nowlin (39) | Black | Oklahoma (Oklahoma City) | Sgt. Christopher Grimes and Sgt. Joshua Castlebury shot Nowlin after they attempted to stop Nowlin's vehicle. Grimes and Castlebury told fellow officers Nowlin refused to stop and then crashed his car into a gate at an apartment complex and fled on foot. Grimes and Castlebury chased the man and said he pulled out a weapon before they killed him. |
| 2014-12-07 | Anthony Wade Moore (31) | White | Nevada (Las Vegas) | Police shot a man inside the Rio Hotel and Casino after confronting him for a robbery. |
| 2014-12-05 | Joseph Glenn Folsom Jr. (61) | White | South Carolina (Camden) | Folsom was shot and killed at his home by a U.S. Marshall seeking to arrest him for an outstanding bench warrant. The South Carolina State Law Enforcement Division is investigating. |
| 2014-12-05 | Gutierrez, Delbert Rodriguez (21) | | Florida (Wynwood) | Police vehicle strikes graffiti suspect during chase when he jumps out from between two parked cars. |
| 2014-12-05 | David Scott Wear (42) | White | California (Los Angeles) | Responding to a report of an assault with a deadly weapon, LAPD officers confronted a man with a pocket knife near the Hollywood Walk of Fame. When he approached the officers, they shot him and killed him. |
| 2014-12-04 | Cordero-Rivera, Alejandro (32) | Hispanic | Florida (Orlando) | Cordero-Rivera was shot in front of his home when police saw a gun with him in his parked car. The Orlando Police Department issued the statement, "Due to the perceived deadly threat, one of the detectives removed his weapon from its holster and shot the suspect." |
| 2014-12-04 | Honea, William Lee (33) | White | Oklahoma (Grant) | After a high-speed chase, the suspect got out of the car with a rifle. An exchange of shots followed and two Choctaw County Sheriff's Deputies killed the suspect. |
| 2014-12-04 | Martinez, Raymond Keith (51) | White | Louisiana (West Monroe) | Ouachita Parish Sheriff's Office shot and killed a homeless man. "He said when he wasn't drinking he had to remember and he didn't want to remember. He never bothered anybody," said local residents. |
| 2014-12-04 | Moller, Karin (55) | White | Maine (South Berwick) | York and South Berwick officers both opened fire on a suicidal woman who they say pointed a gun at them. |
| 2014-12-02 | Jones, William (50) | White | North Carolina (Red Springs) | Two Robeson County Sheriff's deputies used a stun gun on Jones who was found by them walking erratically and without a shirt. Authorities said Jones was uncooperative. |
| 2014-12-02 | Brisbon, Rumain (34) | Black | Arizona (Phoenix) | A police officer who was feeling threatened used lethal force on an unarmed man. The incident left the officer unharmed and Brisbon, 34, dead with two bullet wounds in his torso. Brisbon had a pill bottle in his hand when he was shot, in which the officer allegedly believed was a firearm. |
| 2014-12-02 | Gilbert Richard Reyna (55) | Hispanic | Texas (Fort Worth) | A Fort Worth police officer is on leave after shooting a man who police say had entered a retail store with a screwdriver and a baseball bat. The man charged the officer outside the store and was fatally shot once in the chest. |
| 2014-12-02 | Isaac Lee Ricks (68) | Black | California (Los Angeles) | LAPD shot and killed a man after he stabbed a woman. |
| 2014-12-01 | Pepper, John Earl (45) | White | South Carolina (Anderson County) | Having been called for a welfare check on a dangerous man, police surrounded the home. When the man broke a window and pointed a gun at police, he was shot. |
| 2014-12-01 | Price, Lincoln (24) | Black | Oklahoma (Oklahoma City) | According to police, during a traffic stop officers were trying to take into custody two passengers with outstanding warrants. Price got out of the car and began shooting. The officers returned fire, killing him. |
| 2014-12-01 | Rodriquez, Rosendo Gino (49) | Hispanic | Texas (Midland) | Police found a machete-wielding man in a home they had entered. Failing to subdue him by firing bean bags and after one officer had been hit with the flat side of the machete blade, they fired their guns, killing him. |
| 2014-12-01 | Fiyaz Hussain (16) | Asian | Texas (Harris County) | Two Harris County Sheriff deputies say they shot and killed a suspicious male between 20 and 30. He carried no identification. |
| 2014-12-01 | Jennifer Bond | White | Kentucky (Crittenden) | |

== See also ==
- Death in custody § United States
- Henry A. Wallace Police Crime Public Database
- List of cases of police brutality
- List of countries with annual rates and counts for killings by law enforcement officers
- List of law enforcement officers killed in the line of duty in the United States
- List of law enforcement officers convicted for an on-duty killing in the United States
- List of shootings by US immigration agents
- List of police reforms related to the George Floyd protests
- List of unarmed African Americans killed by law enforcement officers in the United States
- Lists of killings by law enforcement officers
- Police brutality in the United States
- Police misconduct § United States
- Police riot § United States
- Police use of deadly force in the United States
