= Antonio Martin =

Antonio Martin or Antonio Martín may refer to:

- Antonio Martín (1970–1994), Spanish cyclist
- Antonio Martín Eguia (born 1918), Spanish cyclist
- Antonio Martín Espina (born 1966), Spanish basketball player
- Antonio Jesús Martín (born 1982), Spanish 5-a-side football player
- Antonio Martin (shooting victim) (1996–2014)
