= N50 =

N50 may refer to:

== Roads ==
- N50 road (Ireland)
- N50 road (Netherlands)
- N-50 National Highway, in Pakistan
- Nebraska Highway 50, in the United States

== Other uses ==
- N50 (Long Island bus)
- Acer N50, a PDA
- Gaagudju language
- HNoMS Tyr (N50), a mine control vessel of the Royal Norwegian Navy commissioned in 1995
- HNoMS Uller (N50), a minesweeper of the Royal Norwegian Navy acquired in 1962
- Li Calzi Airport, in Cumberland County, New Jersey, United States
- N50 statistic, used in genome assembly
- Nikon N50, a camera
- Nissan Xterra (N50), a Japanese SUV
- Toyota Hilux (N50), a Japanese pickup truck
