= Ferracute Machine Company =

- Industry: Machine
- Founded: 1863 in Bridgeton, New Jersey, United States
- Founder: Oberlin Smith
- Defunct: 1968
- Fate: Sold to Fulton Iron Works
- Key people: George E. Bass
- Products: Metal forming presses

The Ferracute Machine Company was founded by inventor Oberlin Smith in Bridgeton, New Jersey in 1863. Oberlin was an American engineer who was first noted for his work in magnetic recording. Oberlin Smith's ideas in magnetic recording were used by Valdemar Poulsen when he developed magnetic recording successfully.

== History ==
Ferracute Machine Company initially started out as a machine shop but it eventually went on to produce metal forming presses. Early presses were manufactured to make tin cans but eventually the larger Ferracute presses were used extensively to produce automobile parts for Cadillac, Packard, Pierce, Chrysler, Ford and others. In 1910 Ferracute produced 39 presses for Ford's Highland Park plant. Ford Motor Company eventually purchased almost 500 Ferracute presses between 1914 and 1917 for the war effort. Ferracute produced presses for Baldwin Locomotive Works, General Electric as well as for munitions plants in England and Canada.

Under Oberlin Smith's direction, Ferracute Machine Company was progressive and he was always looking for the cutting edge applications for his presses. He traveled to Europe often to seek opportunities. With this goal in mind he produced presses to mint coins; one of his customers was the U.S. Mint. In 1897, engineer Henry A. Janvier went to China to install three presses in the Imperial Chinese mint. In 1909, Ferracute installed the first electric presses in La Casa de Moneda (the mint) of Potosi, Bolivia - one of the oldest and largest mints of the Americas, first established during the Spanish colonial period in 1572.

== Sale ==
In 1937 Ferracute was sold to George E. Bass. With the advent of the Second World War Ferracute once again became a major supplier of machine tools, in the form of presses, to build munitions, aircraft components, and other war material. During World War II, Frankford Arsenal became Ferracute's biggest customer. The governments of Britain and the Soviet Union turned to Ferracute for presses to help them in their domestic war production efforts.

== Closure ==
After the war the business went into general decline until the company was finally closed in 1968. The factory headquarters caught fire on March 2, 2020, at 12:30 in the morning and burned down. The remains of the buildings were subsequently demolished.
