= Melinda Watts =

- Born: Melinda Frances Watts; July 20, 1978 (age 47); Bridgeton, New Jersey
- Origin: Sacramento, California
- Genres: urban contemporary gospel
- Occupations: Singer, songwriter
- Instrument: vocals
- Years active: 2009–present
- Labels: Razor & Tie

Melinda Frances Watts (née, Pickett; born July 20, 1978) is an American urban contemporary gospel artist and musician. She started her music career, in 2009, with her first studio album, People Get Ready, released by Razor & Tie. This album was her breakthrough release upon the Billboard magazine charts.

== Early life ==
Watts was born, Melindia Frances Pickett, on July 20, 1978, in Bridgeton, New Jersey, the daughter of Franklin and Mary Pickett.

== Music career ==
Her music career started in 2005, while her first studio album, People Get Ready, was released on July 28, 2009, with Razor & Tie. This album was her breakthrough released upon the Billboard magazine charts, while it placed on the Gospel Albums and the Heatseekers Albums charts, where it peaked at Nos. 17 and 29, correspondingly. Melinda was the 2008 winner of the Gospel Dream hosted by Matthew West.

== Personal life ==
She is married to William Watts, and they have four children, residing in Sacramento, California, where she founded and operates the Glam Camp for Girls.

== Discography ==
=== Studio albums ===
List of studio albums, with selected chart positions
Title	Album details	Peak chart positions	
Title	Album details	US Gos	US Heat
People Get Ready	Released: July 28, 2009; Label: Razor & Tie; CD, digital download	17	29
