= Oberlin Smith =

American engineer

Oberlin Smith

Oberlin Smith (March 22, 1840 – July 19, 1926) was an American engineer who published one of the earliest works dealing with magnetic recording in 1888.

== Biography ==
He was born on March 22, 1840, in Cincinnati, Ohio, to George R. and Salome (Kemp) Smith.

He started a small machine shop in Bridgeton, New Jersey, where he lived most of his life, which became known as the Ferracute Machine Company in 1877. For the entire existence of the company he was the president and chief engineer.

He died on July 19, 1926, in New Jersey.

== Magnetic recording ==
On September 8, 1888, Smith published a short note entitled "Some Possible Forms of the Phonograph" in the British journal Electrical World, where he suggested (probably for the first time) the use of permanent magnetic impressions for the recording of sound. Smith suggested using cotton or silk thread, into which steel dust or short clippings of fine wire could be suspended. These particles were to be magnetized in accordance with the alternating current from a microphone source. Smith also discussed the possibility of using a hard metal wire or chain, but preferred the thread.

Smith built a machine to spin steel dust into thread, but could not harden the dust because of oxidation. As implementing his ideas would require thousands of hours of work, he published his theories but no one attempted to implement them. Many of Smith's ideas were independently reproduced by Valdemar Poulsen when he developed the first true magnetic recorder.
