= Cohanzick Zoo =

- Interactive map of Cohanzick Zoo
- 39°26′25″N 75°14′12″W
- Date opened: 1934
- Location: Bridgeton, New Jersey
- Land area: 15 acres (6.1 ha)
- No. of animals: 100
- No. of species: 45
- Owner: City of Bridgeton
- Website: https://cohanzick-zoo.com/

Cohanzick Zoo is a zoo in Bridgeton, New Jersey. Opened in 1934, it bills itself as New Jersey's first zoo. It houses over 100 animals, representing 45 species. Part of the city's Department of Recreation and Public Affairs, it is also supported by the Cumberland County government and donations. The zoo has an "adopt-an-animal" program to sponsor animal welfare.
