= Bucks Airport =

- IATA: none; ICAO: none; FAA LID: 00N

Summary
- Airport type: Public use
- Owner: Aaron Pearl
- Location: Bridgeton, New Jersey
- Elevation AMSL: 108 ft (33 m)
- Coordinates: 39°28′23″N 075°11′04″W

Map
- Interactive map of Bucks Airport

Runways
Direction	Length		Surface
Direction	ft	m	Surface
18/36	1,900	579	Turf

Statistics (2008)
- Aircraft operations: 1,200
- Based aircraft: 21
- Source: Federal Aviation Administration

Bucks Airport (FAA LID: 00N) is a privately owned, public-use airport located three nautical miles (3.5 mi, 5.6 km) northeast of the central business district of Bridgeton, a city in Cumberland County, New Jersey, United States.

== Facilities and aircraft ==
Bucks Airport covers an area of 63 acres (25 ha) at an elevation of 108 feet (33 m) above mean sea level. It has one runway designated 18/36 with a turf surface measuring 1,900 by 150 feet (579 x 46 m).

For the 12-month period ending December 31, 2008, the airport had 1,200 general aviation aircraft operations, an average of 100 per month. At that time there were 21 aircraft based at this airport: 95% single-engine and 5% multi-engine.

== Accidents ==
There have been 4 non-fatal accidents and one Fatal Accident at Bucks Airport. On September 19, 2022 a father and son were killed when their plane crashed just after taking off from Bucks.
