= Killing of Jerame Reid =

2014 police killing in New Jersey

- A screenshot of the pull over, seconds before Jerame Reid (right), who came out of the car, was shot by the police
- Date: Saturday, December 30, 2014
- Location: Bridgeton, New Jersey, U.S.
- Participants: Braheme Days (police officer); Roger Worley (police officer); Jerame Reid (deceased); Leroy Tutt (accompanied Reid)
- Deaths: Jerame Reid
- Charges: None filed

On December 30, 2014, 36-year-old African-American man Jerame Reid was shot and killed in Bridgeton, New Jersey, by Bridgeton police officer Braheme Days and his partner, Roger Worley, during a traffic stop for running through a stop sign. The encounter was captured on a dashcam video that was released on January 22, 2015.

== Details ==
The two-minute fatal encounter started from a routine traffic stop, in which Bridgeton officers Braheme Days and Roger Worley pulled over a vehicle for running through a stop sign. While questioning the two men in the car, Leroy Tutt and Jerame Reid, both African-Americans, the video shows Days suddenly shouting to his partner, "We've got a gun in his glove compartment!", followed by "Show me your fucking hands."

Days appeared to recognize Reid, as he is heard calling him by his first name. Days retrieved a large silver handgun from the glove compartment. Days continued to warn Reid to not move, as Reid continued to move his hands around inside the vehicle. Several times, Days exclaimed, "He's reaching for something!"

As the situation intensified, someone in the vehicle can be heard telling the officers, "I'm not reaching for nothing. I ain't got no reason to reach for nothing." Reid then told Days, "I'm getting out and getting on the ground." The officer responded, "No you're not, stay right there, don't move."

A struggle ensued as Reid tried to push the door open, and the officer attempted to keep the door closed. Days stepped back, and Reid pushed the door open, got up, and exited the car with his hands at chest level. Days backed up and fired as Reid exits the vehicle. Reid exited the vehicle moving his hands upwards in an isosceles style shooting position. Worley fired one shot, and Reid was fatally wounded. Reid was unarmed at the time.

== Legal Action ==
According to a statement from the Cumberland County Prosecutor's Office, the two officers told investigators that they feared for their lives, believing that Reid was reaching for a weapon. On August 20, 2015, a grand jury voted not to file charges against the two officers involved in the shooting.

== Braheme Days ==
Braheme Days is African American and formerly worked as a personal finance teacher at Woodbury High School in 2009. During a 2011 meeting of Bridgeton residents, Days suggested violence is a "many-headed beast, and we are going to have to attack it from many angles." Days is the father of Braheme Days Jr., a shot putter from Bridgeton High School.

Days joined the Bridgeton police force in 2012 after training in the academy for six months. He was praised by Police Chief Mark Ott for winning "four out of the five awards given to recruits in his graduating class." Cumberland County Prosecutor Jennifer Webb-McRae, who knew Days through another community leadership position he held, praised Days' "excellent character." In August 2014, Days and Patrolman Edward Connolly were allegedly shot at by Tyshaun S. Milledge while investigating a burglary. Milledge pleaded not guilty to the charge of shooting at the officers.

Between 2012 and the Reid shooting, there had been nine municipal court complaints filed alleging that Days had "stopped, searched or charged for no reason," but these complaints were dismissed with the reason of a lack of probable cause. In October 2014, a video emerged of a Bridgeton police officer spraying a handcuffed suspect with what appears to be pepper spray, with the suspect questioning why the "macing" was being used against him. People at the scene and within the video identified Days by name as the officer.

In February 2015, a US$ 25 million lawsuit was filed against Braheme Days by Shakera Brown. Brown claimed that from January to December 2014, Days extorted her for sex in exchange for not sending her to jail. The City of Bridgeton settled with Brown out of court for five thousand dollars.

== See also ==
- List of unarmed African Americans killed by law enforcement officers in the United States
