= Li Calzi Airport =

- IATA: none; ICAO: none; FAA LID: N50

Summary
- Airport type: Public use
- Owner: Peter Huang
- Serves: Bridgeton, New Jersey
- Elevation AMSL: 42 ft / 13 m
- Coordinates: 39°24′30″N 075°14′14″W

Map
- Interactive map of Li Calzi Airport

Runways
Direction	Length		Surface
Direction	ft	m	Surface
12/30	2,773	845	Turf

Statistics (2007)
- Aircraft operations: 300
- Source: Federal Aviation Administration

Li Calzi Airport (FAA LID: N50) was a privately owned, public-use airport located two nautical miles (2.3 mi, 3.7 km) south of the central business district of Bridgeton, a city in Cumberland County, New Jersey, United States.

== Facilities and aircraft ==
Li Calzi Airport covered an area of 30 acres (12 ha) at an elevation of 42 feet (13 m) above mean sea level. It had one runway designated 12/30 with a turf surface measuring 2,773 by 100 feet (845 x 30 m). For the 12-month period ending April 30, 2007, the airport had 300 general aviation aircraft operations, an average of 25 per month.
