= Bridgeton, New Jersey =

City in Cumberland County, New Jersey, US

- City
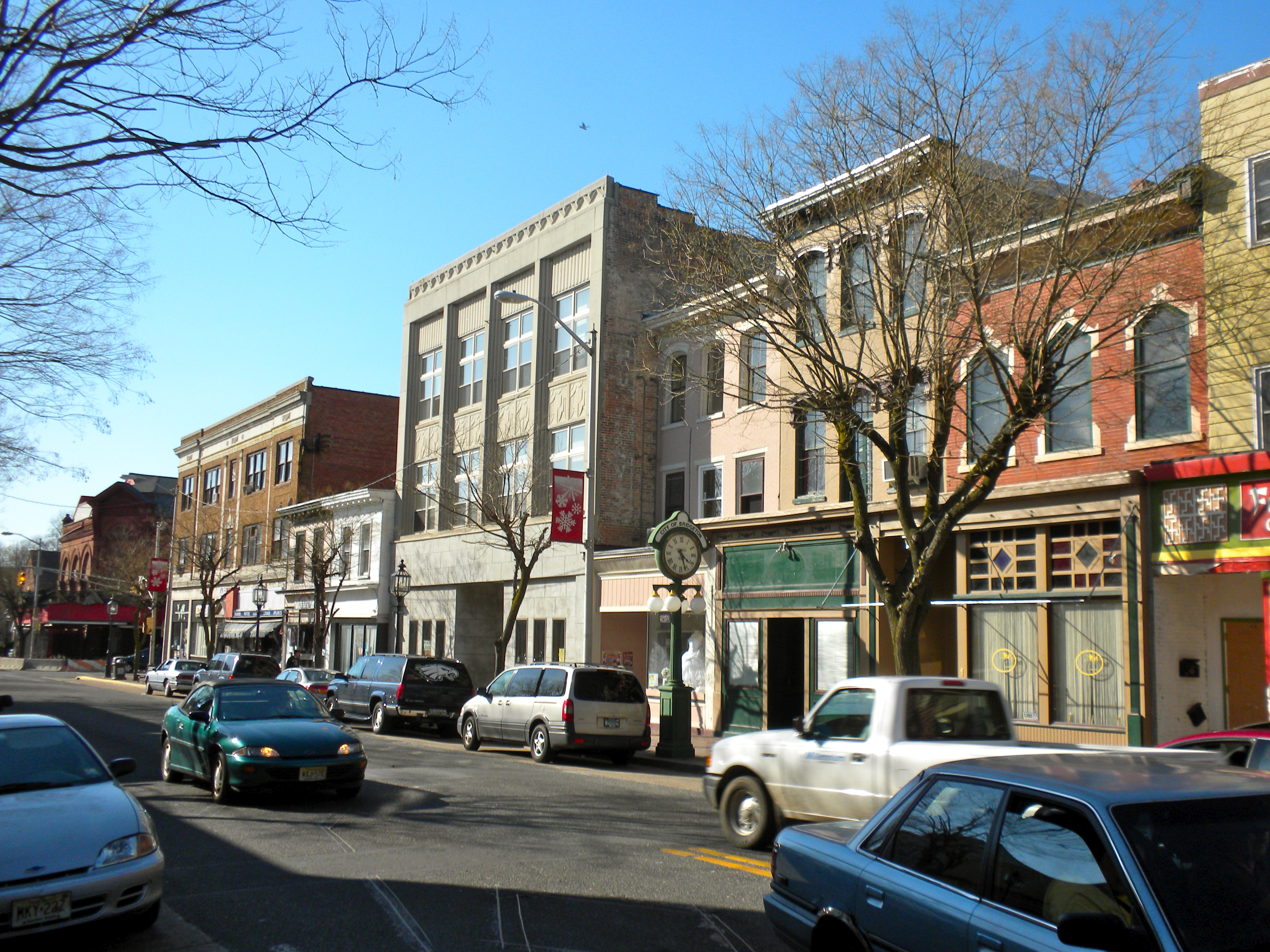
- Downtown Bridgeton, March 2010

- Flag Seal
- Interactive map of Bridgeton, New Jersey
- Location in Cumberland County Location in New Jersey Location in the United States
- Coordinates: 39.427518°N 75.227954°W
- Country: United States
- State: New Jersey
- County: Cumberland
- Incorporated: March 1, 1865
- Named after: Bridge on Cohansey River

Government
  - Type: Faulkner Act (mayor–council)
  - Body: City Council
  - Mayor: Albert B. Kelly (term ends December 31, 2026)
  - Administrator: Kevin C. Rabago Sr.
  - Municipal clerk: Nichole L. Almanza

Area
  - Total: 6.49 sq mi (16.82 km^{2})
  - Land: 6.23 sq mi (16.13 km^{2})
  - Water: 0.27 sq mi (0.69 km^{2}) 4.10%
  - Rank: 249th of 565 in state 13th of 14 in county
- Elevation: 39 ft (12 m)

Population (2020)
  - Total: 27,263
  - Estimate (2023): 26,763
  - Rank: 93rd of 565 in state 3rd of 14 in county
  - Density: 4,377.5/sq mi (1,690.2/km^{2})
  - Rank: 142nd of 565 in state 1st of 14 in county
- Time zone: UTC−05:00 (Eastern (EST))
  - Summer (DST): UTC−04:00 (Eastern (EDT))
- ZIP Code: 08302
- Area code: 856
- FIPS code: 3401107600
- GNIS feature ID: 0885169
- Website: www.cityofbridgetonnj.gov

Bridgeton is a city in Cumberland County, within the U.S. state of New Jersey. It is the county seat of Cumberland County and is located on the Cohansey River near Delaware Bay in the South Jersey region of the state.

As of the 2020 United States census, the city's population was 27,263, its highest decennial count ever and an increase of 1,914 (+7.6%) from the 25,349 recorded at the 2010 census, which in turn reflected an increase of 2,578 (+11.3%) from the 22,771 counted in the 2000 census. Bridgeton and Vineland are the two principal cities of the Vineland-Bridgeton metropolitan statistical area, which encompasses those cities and all of Cumberland County for statistical purposes and which constitutes a part of the Philadelphia metropolitan area.

As of 2020, Bridgeton had the 13th-highest property tax rate in New Jersey with an equalized rate of 4.598% compared to 3.089% in the county as a whole and a statewide average of 2.279%.

== History ==
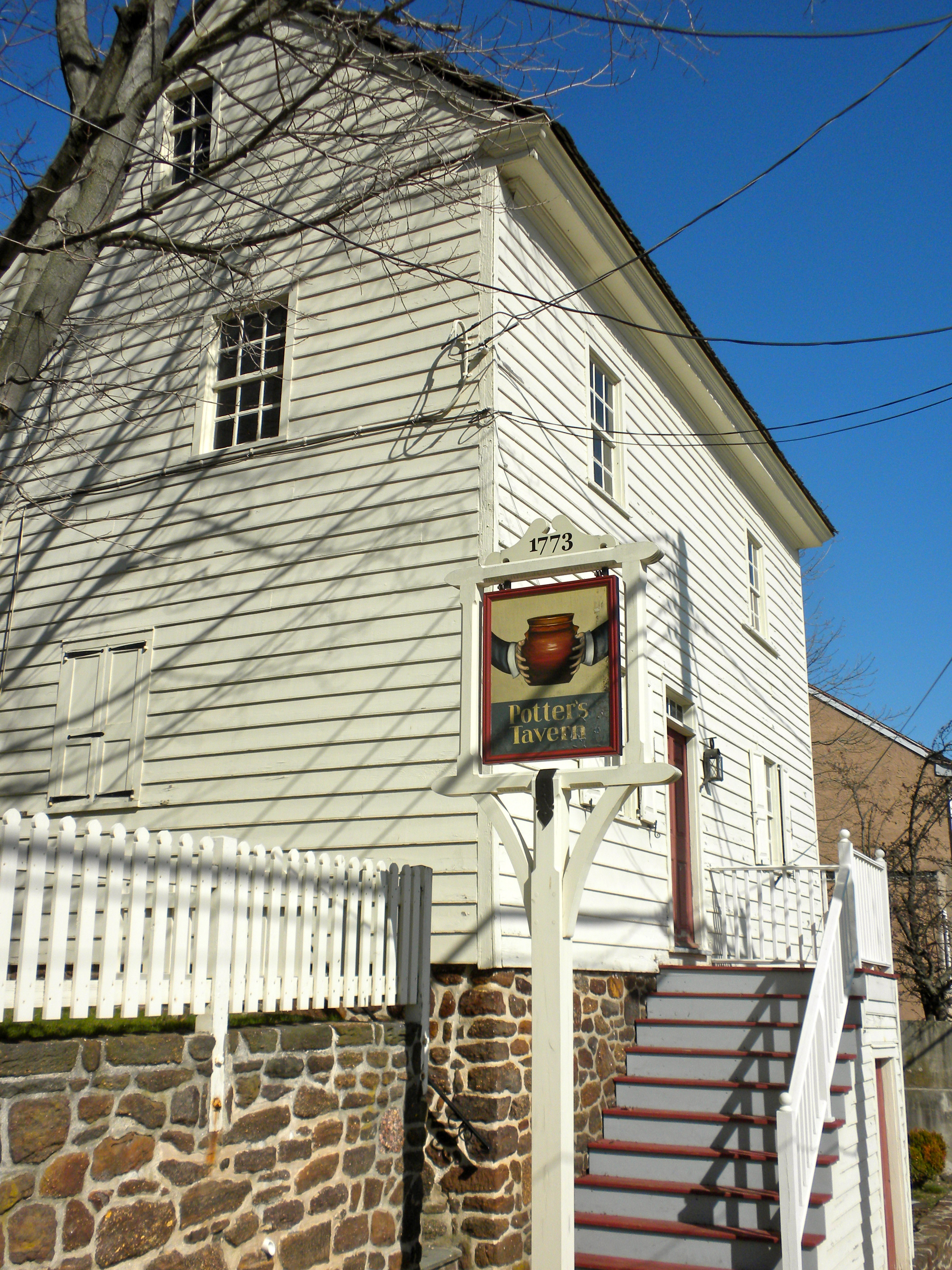
Potter's Tavern, built in 1750

Similar to other areas near rivers and the bay, this area was inhabited for thousands of years by Indigenous peoples. At the time of European contact, Lenape Native Americans lived in the area. The tribe followed a seasonal pattern of cultivation and hunting and fishing. The state-recognized Nanticoke Lenni-Lenape Indians of New Jersey maintain a cultural center here, serving a community of 12,000 in Cumberland, Gloucester and Salem counties. The organization shares ancestral and cultural ties with the state-recognized Lenape Indian Tribe of Delaware and the state-recognized Nanticoke Indian Association of Delaware. All three organizations have ancestors who were once known as the Delaware Moors, a mixed-race group in Delaware and New Jersey that was legally classified as African-Americans until 1914, when the State of Delaware reclassified its members as a separate, non-Black group.

The first recorded European settlement in what is now Bridgeton occurred in 1686, when Richard Hancock established a sawmill there. Settlers established a pioneer iron-works in 1814. Bridgeton was incorporated as a township by an act of the New Jersey Legislature on March 3, 1845, from portions of Deerfield Township. Bridgeton was incorporated as a city on March 1, 1865, replacing both Bridgeton Township and Cohansey Township. The city was named for its location at a bridge on the Cohansey River and is said to be a corruption of "Bridge Town".

After the American Civil War, Bridgeton's industrial base and commercial centrality in this area of high agricultural production, along with its high profile as an educational center (it was home to the South Jersey Institute, the West Jersey Academy, and two notable academies for women), made it the most prosperous town in the state. Bridgeton was home to glass factories, sewing factories, metal and machine works and other manufacturers, most notably, the Ferracute Machine Works, which was founded and operated by Oberlin Smith, an inventor and philanthropist credited with inventing the first device for magnetic recording, and now in the New Jersey Inventors Hall of Fame.

The Bridgeton Historic District covers a quarter of the city and includes more than 2,000 properties. These range from the early Federal architecture to the 1920s, including many structures eligible for individual listing and some documented by the Historic American Buildings Survey (HABS) during the 1930s. The district was added to the National Register of Historic Places in 1982 and is the largest such district within any municipality in New Jersey.

Although it is visually dominated by large Victorian homes and a downtown area constructed from the 1880s to the 1920s, the district, besides many neighborhoods of gingerbreaded "doubles" that were essentially working-class housing, includes several notable structures dating from the 18th century and early Federal period. One of these is Potter's Tavern, said to have been built in the 1750s, but restored to its appearance in 1776 when it was home to The Plain Dealer, considered New Jersey's first newspaper.

A second is Brearley (Masonic) Lodge, founded by General James Giles in 1795, and still active today. A third is the so-called "Nail House" (c. 1815; second building c. 1855), the administrative home of the Cumberland Nail & Iron Works that established Bridgeton's industrial prowess in the early nineteenth century. The first Cumberland National Bank building (1816), which was only the second bank chartered in New Jersey, is now part of the Bridgeton Library. There is also the David Sheppard House (1791), recently restored with assistance from the Garden State Historic Trust and home to the Cousteau Coastal Center of Rutgers University since 2008.

Bridgeton straddles the tidal Cohansey River and is located near the center of the Delaware Bay lowlands. It derives its name from the original movable bridge that offered the option of regular overland travel on the "King's Highway" across the Cohansey watershed region for the first time in 1716. The name is believed to have been changed from Bridge-towne to Bridgeton in 1816–1817 due to a printing error on documents published by the Cumberland Bank.

Bridgeton is home to numerous large municipal parks. The largest of these, consisting of pinelands, wetlands and lakes, as well as the original raceway system that provided waterpower to the mills, was formed out of the property owned and managed by the Cumberland Nail & Iron Works until 1899. Long considered a recreational area for the region even under ownership by the Iron Works, the property was finally purchased in 1902–1903 by the city and preserved in perpetuity as the Bridgeton City Park. It includes three major lakes: Mary Elmer Lake, Sunset Lake, and East Lake. Bridgeton Park encompasses about 1,500 acres (6.1 km^{2}). It now includes the Cohanzick Zoo, New Jersey's oldest zoo, which is free to the public.

The city suffered an economic downturn in the 1980s with the loss of its remaining manufacturing sector jobs in glass and textiles. Agricultural employment, however, has continued to attract immigrant workers largely from Mexico but also Guatemala, creating new challenges and opportunities for revitalization. A significant minority of Bridgeton residents and their children speak Zapoteco, either as their only language or alongside Spanish.

Downtown Bridgeton includes an art gallery, secondhand stores, a makerspace, and the headquarters of the Nanticoke Lenni-Lenape Tribal Nation. The makerspace, called STEAMWorks, was opened as a collaborative project between the city and the local Cumberland County College, run by the college the space offers specialized equipment and software to the public at a membership based pricing system, as well as workshops and a limited set of certification courses, no involvement with the college is required.

Bridgeton Main Street declared its downtown a Culinary Arts district and is highlighting downtown activity through the food and cooking-related retail sector. Bridgeton Main Street Association is the oldest Main Street Association in the state, founded in 1990.

In 2008, Rutgers opened the Cousteau Coastal Center of its Institute of Marine & Coastal Sciences in the former David Sheppard House, a base from which it coordinates cutting-edge ecological research and develops modules for environmental learning at all educational levels from elementary school upward.

South Woods State Prison, which opened near Bridgeton in 1997, is the largest state prison in New Jersey and provides a range of employment.

Bridgeton is home to the Rutgers Food Innovation Center, an entry point for startup food manufacturers that allows a new company or entrepreneur to work with a specialized team from Rutgers University to develop, test, brand, and package their product.

== Geography ==
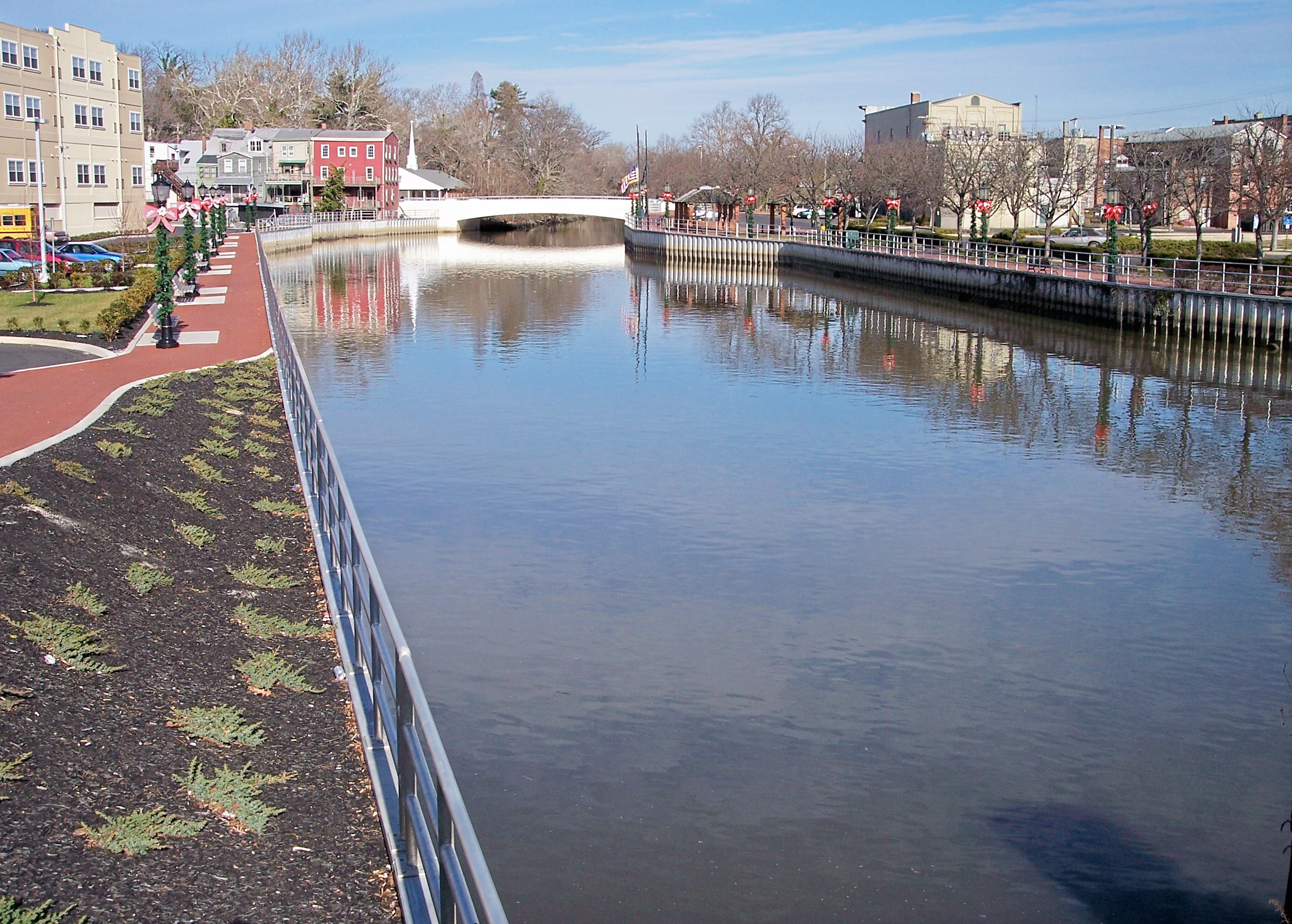
The Cohansey River in Bridgeton in 2006

Bridgeton is located about one hour away from Philadelphia, and 50 minutes away from Wilmington, Delaware. It is also about one hour away from Atlantic City and Cape May. Bridgeton is divided into three sections, Northside, Southside and Hillside.

According to the U.S. Census Bureau, the city had a total area of 6.49 square miles (16.82 km^{2}), including 6.23 square miles (16.13 km^{2}) of land and 0.27 square miles (0.69 km^{2}) of water (4.10%). Unincorporated communities, localities and place names located partially or completely within the city include East Lake.

Bridgeton borders the Cumberland County municipalities of Fairfield Township, Hopewell Township and Upper Deerfield Township.

=== Climate ===
The climate in this area is characterized by hot, humid summers and generally mild to cool winters. According to the Köppen Climate Classification system, Bridgeton has a humid subtropical climate, abbreviated "Cfa" on climate maps.

== Demographics ==
Historical population
| Census | Pop. | Note | %± |
|---|---|---|---|
| 1870 | 6,830 | | — |
| 1880 | 8,722 | | 27.7% |
| 1890 | 11,424 | | 31.0% |
| 1900 | 13,913 | | 21.8% |
| 1910 | 14,209 | | 2.1% |
| 1920 | 14,323 | | 0.8% |
| 1930 | 15,699 | | 9.6% |
| 1940 | 15,992 | | 1.9% |
| 1950 | 18,378 | | 14.9% |
| 1960 | 20,966 | | 14.1% |
| 1970 | 20,435 | | −2.5% |
| 1980 | 18,795 | | −8.0% |
| 1990 | 18,942 | | 0.8% |
| 2000 | 22,771 | | 20.2% |
| 2010 | 25,349 | | 11.3% |
| 2020 | 27,263 | | 7.6% |
| 2023 (est.) | 26,763 | | −1.8% |
Population sources: 1870–2000; 1870–1920 1870 1880–1890; 1890–1910 1870–1930; 1940–2000; 2010 2020

=== 2020 census ===
As of the 2020 census, Bridgeton had a population of 27,263. The median age was 32.3 years. 28.3% of residents were under the age of 18 and 7.4% of residents were 65 years of age or older. For every 100 females there were 135.5 males, and for every 100 females age 18 and over there were 153.0 males age 18 and over.

99.6% of residents lived in urban areas, while 0.4% lived in rural areas.

There were 6,636 households in Bridgeton, of which 48.5% had children under the age of 18 living in them. Of all households, 30.0% were married-couple households, 18.9% were households with a male householder and no spouse or partner present, and 38.8% were households with a female householder and no spouse or partner present. About 23.8% of all households were made up of individuals and 9.4% had someone living alone who was 65 years of age or older.

There were 7,274 housing units, of which 8.8% were vacant. The homeowner vacancy rate was 2.6% and the rental vacancy rate was 5.6%.

Racial composition as of the 2020 census
| Race | Number | Percent |
|---|---|---|
| White | 4,537 | 16.6% |
| Black or African American | 7,194 | 26.4% |
| American Indian and Alaska Native | 941 | 3.5% |
| Asian | 116 | 0.4% |
| Native Hawaiian and Other Pacific Islander | 5 | 0.0% |
| Some other race | 11,599 | 42.5% |
| Two or more races | 2,871 | 10.5% |
| Hispanic or Latino (of any race) | 16,369 | 60.0% |

=== Income and poverty ===
The Census Bureau's 2006–2010 American Community Survey showed that (in 2010 inflation-adjusted dollars) median household income was $31,044 (with a margin of error of +/− $2,412) and the median family income was $38,750 (+/− $2,233). Males had a median income of $31,202 (+/− $3,369) versus $31,031 (+/− $2,158) for females. The per capita income for the borough was $12,418 (+/− $1,023). About 26.3% of families and 27.7% of the population were below the poverty line, including 35.4% of those under age 18 and 15.6% of those age 65 or over.

As of 2015, 32.0% of residents were living in poverty. The poverty rate was 13.3% for White Non-Hispanic residents, 35.6% for Black residents, 33.7% for Hispanic or Latino residents, 66.3% for American Indian residents, 32.9% for other race residents and 29.9% for two or more races residents.

=== Immigration ===
Residents in the town include numerous immigrants from the south of Mexico, whose Amerindian languages include Zapotec, Nahuatl, and Mixtec.

=== 2010 census ===
The 2010 United States census counted 25,349 people, 6,265 households, and 4,304 families in the city. The population density was 4,102.5 per square mile (1,584.0/km^{2}). There were 6,782 housing units at an average density of 1,097.6 per square mile (423.8/km^{2}). The racial makeup was 32.64% (8,274) White, 35.49% (8,996) Black or African American, 1.38% (350) Native American, 0.60% (153) Asian, 0.05% (12) Pacific Islander, 25.71% (6,518) from other races, and 4.13% (1,046) from two or more races. Hispanic or Latino of any race were 43.58% (11,046) of the population.

Of the 6,265 households, 40.4% had children under the age of 18; 32.7% were married couples living together; 27.7% had a female householder with no husband present and 31.3% were non-families. Of all households, 25.8% were made up of individuals and 10.6% had someone living alone who was 65 years of age or older. The average household size was 3.36 and the average family size was 3.85.

27.9% of the population were under the age of 18, 12.2% from 18 to 24, 34.6% from 25 to 44, 18.1% from 45 to 64, and 7.1% who were 65 years of age or older. The median age was 29.7 years. For every 100 females, the population had 135.3 males. For every 100 females ages 18 and older there were 151.6 males.

=== 2000 census ===
As of the 2000 census, there were 22,771 people, 6,182 households, and 4,179 families residing in the city. The population density was 3,659.8 inhabitants per square mile (1,413.1/km^{2}). There were 6,795 housing units at an average density of 1,092.1 per square mile (421.7/km^{2}). The racial makeup of the city was 38.88% White, 41.84% African American, 1.19% Native American, 0.70% Asian, 0.09% Pacific Islander, 13.67% from other races, and 3.63% from two or more races. Hispanic or Latino of any race were 24.49% of the population.

There were 6,182 households, out of which 36.1% had children under the age of 18 living with them, 35.3% were married couples living together, 26.3% had a female householder with no husband present, and 32.4% were non-families. 27.4% of all households were made up of individuals, and 13.1% had someone living alone who was 65 years of age or older. The average household size was 2.96 and the average family size was 3.49.

In the city, the population was spread out, with 26.0% under the age of 18, 11.2% from 18 to 24, 36.0% from 25 to 44, 15.9% from 45 to 64, and 10.9% who were 65 years of age or older. The median age was 32 years. For every 100 females, there were 130.7 males. For every 100 females age 18 and over, there were 139.1 males.

The median income for a household in the city was $26,923, and the median income for a family was $30,502. Males had a median income of $28,858 versus $22,722 for females. The per capita income for the city was $10,917. About 22.7% of families and 26.6% of the population were below the poverty line, including 33.3% of those under age 18 and 17.8% of those age 65 or over.

== Economy ==
Portions of Bridgeton are part of an Urban Enterprise Zone. The city was selected in 1983 as one of the initial group of 10 municipalities chosen to participate in the program. In addition to other benefits to encourage employment within the Zone, shoppers can take advantage of a reduced 3.3125% sales tax rate (half of the 6.625% rate charged statewide) at eligible merchants. Established in January 1986, the city's Urban Enterprise Zone status expires in December 2023.

The UEZ program in Bridgeton and four other original UEZ cities had been allowed to lapse as of January 1, 2017, after Governor Chris Christie, who called the program an "abject failure", vetoed a compromise bill that would have extended the status for two years. In May 2018, Governor Phil Murphy signed a law that reinstated the program in these five cities and extended the expiration date in other zones.

Bridgeton is home to Ardagh Group, one of the largest glass production facilities in the state. In 2016, Ardagh Group, Glass – North America became ISO 14001 certified, which recognizes efforts to minimize their impact on the environment, comply with applicable laws and regulations, and work toward continuous environmental improvement.

== Government ==
=== Crime ===
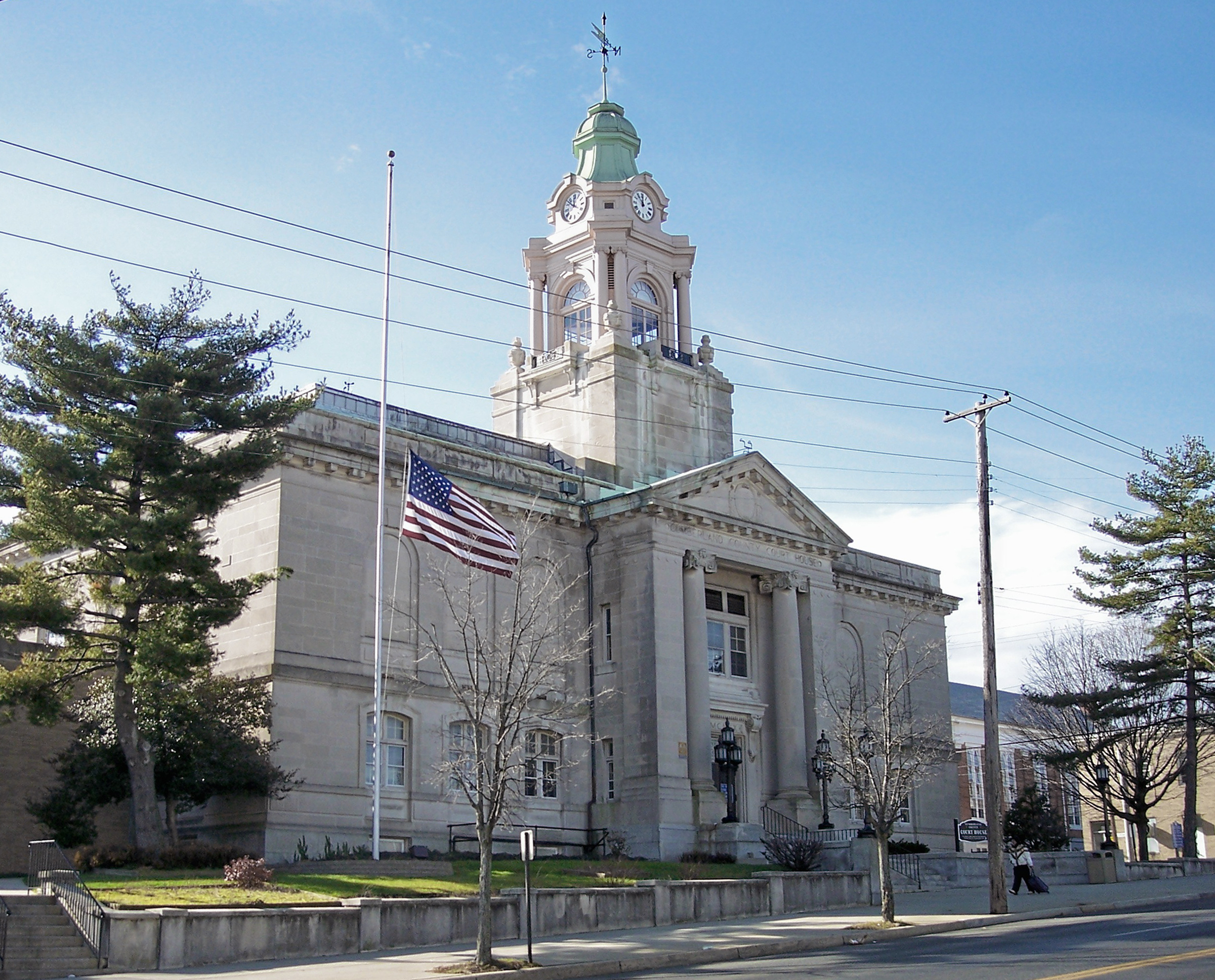
The Cumberland County Courthouse in Bridgeton in 2006

Bridgeton has consistently had violent crime rates above the national average. It is among the highest in the state, along with Camden, Atlantic City, Newark, and Trenton. In 2015, NeighborhoodScout, a real estate analytics firm, ranked it as the 25th most dangerous city in America. A 2019 report in the Asbury Park Press listed Bridgeton at fifth on its list of the state's ten most dangerous cities. In 2022, based on data from FBI Uniform Crime Reports, Bridgeton had 203 violent crimes, ranked ninth highest among all municipalities in the state.

=== Local government ===
The City of Bridgeton is governed within the Faulkner Act system of municipal government, formally known as the Optional Municipal Charter Law, under Mayor-Council plan A, as implemented on July 1, 1970, based on the recommendations of a Charter Study Commission. The city is one of 71 municipalities (of the 564) statewide governed under this form. The governing body is comprised of a mayor and a five-member City Council. Council members are elected at-large in non-partisan elections and serve concurrent four-year terms of office in balloting held as part of the November general election. Based on the results of an ordinance passed in June 2011, Bridgeton's non-partisan elections were shifted from May to November, which took effect with the November 2014 general election.

The mayor exercises executive power of the municipality and appoints department heads with council approval. The mayor may remove department heads subject to council disapproval by 2/3 of all members, prepares the budget. The mayor has veto over ordinances, subject to override by 2/3 of all members of the council. The mayor exercises executive power of the municipality. Up to ten departments may be created under the mayor's direction. A business administrator assists the mayor in budget preparation and administers purchasing and personnel systems. By ordinance, the business administrator may supervise administration of departments, subject to mayor's direction. The City Council exercises legislative power of municipality and approves appointment of department heads. The council may disapprove removal of department heads by 2/3 vote of all members and can override the mayor's veto by 2/3 of all members. The council selects one of its own members to serve as its president.

As of 2025, the Mayor is Albert B. Kelly, whose term of office ends on December 31, 2026. Members of the City Council are Council President Edward Bethea, Rosemary DeQuinzio, James Curtis Edwards, David Gonzalez and Marian King, all of whom are serving concurrent terms of office that end December 31, 2026.

Marian King was appointed to fill the seat that had been held by Samuel W. Feinstein. King served on an interim basis until the November 2021 general election, when she was elected to serve the balance of the term of office.

=== Federal, state, and county representation ===
Bridgeton is located in the 2nd Congressional District and is part of New Jersey's 1st state legislative district.

For the 119th United States Congress, New Jersey's 2nd congressional district is represented by Jeff Van Drew (R, Dennis Township). New Jersey is represented in the United States Senate by Democrats Cory Booker (Newark, term ends 2027) and Andy Kim (Moorestown, term ends 2031).

For the 2026–2027 session, the 1st legislative district of the New Jersey Legislature is represented in the State Senate by Mike Testa (R, Vineland) and in the General Assembly by Antwan McClellan (R, Ocean City) and Erik K. Simonsen (R, Lower Township).

Cumberland County is governed by a Board of County Commissioners composed of seven members who are elected at large by the citizens of Cumberland County in partisan elections and serve staggered three-year terms in office, with either two or three seats coming up for election each year in a three-year cycle. Annually, the seven board members select a Director and Deputy Director for one-year terms. As of 2025, members of the Cumberland County Board of County Commissioners (with party affiliation, residence and term-end year listed in parentheses) are:

Douglas A. Albrecht (R, Vineland, 2025), Deputy Director Antonio Romero (R, Vineland, 2027), Sandra Taylor (R, Downe Township; 2026), Victoria Groetsch-Lods (R, Vineland, 2025), Arthur Marchand (R, Hopewell Township, 2026), James Sauro (R, Vineland, 2026) and Robert A. Austino (D, Bridgeton, 2027).

The county's constitutional officers are: Clerk Celeste Riley (D, Bridgeton, 2029), Sheriff Michael Donato (R, Bridgeton, 2026) and Surrogate Rudolph Luisi (R, Vineland, 2028).

The New Jersey Department of Corrections South Woods State Prison is located in Bridgeton. City officials opposed a plan announced in 2007 that would move over 1,000 prisoners from Riverfront State Prison in Camden to South Woods.

=== Politics ===
As of March 2011, there were a total of 8,699 registered voters in Bridgeton, of which 2,816 (32.4%) were registered as Democrats, 772 (8.9%) were registered as Republicans and 5,104 (58.7%) were registered as Unaffiliated. There were 7 voters registered as Libertarians or Greens.

United States presidential election results for Bridgeton 2024 2020 2016 2012 2008 2004
| Year | Republican | | Democratic | | Third party(ies) | |
| Year | No. | % | No. | % | No. | % |
|---|---|---|---|---|---|---|
| 2024 | 1,095 | 28.35% | 2,719 | 70.39% | 49 | 1.27% |
| 2020 | 1,094 | 23.01% | 3,616 | 76.06% | 44 | 0.93% |
| 2016 | 1,003 | 22.47% | 3,340 | 74.82% | 121 | 2.71% |
| 2012 | 891 | 17.63% | 4,125 | 81.63% | 37 | 0.73% |
| 2008 | 1,111 | 20.42% | 4,238 | 77.90% | 91 | 1.67% |
| 2004 | 1,552 | 33.63% | 3,044 | 65.96% | 19 | 0.41% |

In the 2012 presidential election, Democrat Barack Obama received 81.6% of the vote (4,125 cast), ahead of Republican Mitt Romney with 17.6% (891 votes), and other candidates with 0.7% (37 votes), among the 5,088 ballots cast by the city's 9,034 registered voters (35 ballots were spoiled), for a turnout of 56.3%. In the 2008 presidential election, Democrat Barack Obama received 77.9% of the vote here (4,238 cast), ahead of Republican John McCain, who received 20.4% (1,111 votes), with 5,440 ballots cast among the city's 8,986 registered voters, for a turnout of 60.5%. In the 2004 presidential election, Democrat John Kerry received 66.0% of the vote here (3,044 ballots cast), outpolling Republican George W. Bush, who received 33.6% (1,552 votes), with 4,615 ballots cast among the city's 7,978 registered voters, for a turnout percentage of 57.8.

Gubernatorial election results for Bridgeton
| Year | Republican | | Democratic | | Third party(ies) | |
| Year | No. | % | No. | % | No. | % |
|---|---|---|---|---|---|---|
| 2025 | 612 | 21.47% | 2,209 | 77.51% | 29 | 1.02% |
| 2021 | 564 | 29.58% | 1,320 | 69.22% | 23 | 1.21% |
| 2017 | 454 | 22.88% | 1,479 | 74.55% | 51 | 2.57% |
| 2013 | 867 | 35.93% | 1,513 | 62.70% | 33 | 1.37% |
| 2009 | 647 | 24.74% | 1,806 | 69.06% | 162 | 6.20% |
| 2005 | 723 | 28.13% | 1,773 | 68.99% | 74 | 2.88% |

In the 2013 gubernatorial election, Democrat Barbara Buono received 62.7% of the vote (1,513 cast), ahead of Republican Chris Christie with 35.9% (867 votes), and other candidates with 1.4% (33 votes), among the 2,499 ballots cast by the city's 8,320 registered voters (86 ballots were spoiled), for a turnout of 30.0%. In the 2009 gubernatorial election, Democrat Jon Corzine received 67.2% of the vote here (1,806 ballots cast), ahead of both Republican Chris Christie with 24.1% (647 votes) and Independent Chris Daggett with 4.4% (118 votes), with 2,687 ballots cast among the city's 8,524 registered voters, yielding a 31.5% turnout.

United States Senate election results for Bridgeton1
| Year | Republican | | Democratic | | Third party(ies) | |
| Year | No. | % | No. | % | No. | % |
|---|---|---|---|---|---|---|
| 2024 | 919 | 25.52% | 2,517 | 69.90% | 165 | 4.58% |
| 2018 | 800 | 27.87% | 1,962 | 68.36% | 108 | 3.76% |
| 2012 | 739 | 16.37% | 3,682 | 81.59% | 92 | 2.04% |
| 2006 | 796 | 31.59% | 1,626 | 64.52% | 98 | 3.89% |

United States Senate election results for Bridgeton2
| Year | Republican | | Democratic | | Third party(ies) | |
| Year | No. | % | No. | % | No. | % |
|---|---|---|---|---|---|---|
| 2020 | 969 | 20.86% | 3,495 | 75.24% | 181 | 3.90% |
| 2014 | 521 | 22.40% | 1,768 | 76.01% | 37 | 1.59% |
| 2013 | 329 | 23.77% | 1,044 | 75.43% | 11 | 0.79% |
| 2008 | 929 | 20.09% | 3,558 | 76.95% | 137 | 2.96% |

== Education ==
Bridgeton's public schools are operated by Bridgeton Public Schools, which serve students in preschool through twelfth grade. The district is one of 31 former Abbott districts statewide that were established pursuant to the decision by the New Jersey Supreme Court in Abbott v. Burke which are now referred to as "SDA Districts" based on the requirement for the state to cover all costs for school building and renovation projects in these districts under the supervision of the New Jersey Schools Development Authority. As of the 2020–21 school year, the district, comprised of eight schools, had an enrollment of 6,313 students and 511.0 classroom teachers (on an FTE basis), for a student–teacher ratio of 12.4:1. Schools in the district (with 2020–21 enrollment data from the National Center for Education Statistics) are Geraldine O. Foster Early Childhood Center (308 students in PreK), Broad Street School (936; K-8), Buckshutem Road School (686; K-8), Cherry Street School (558; K-8), ExCEL School (enrollment not listed; K-8), Indian Avenue School (668; K-8), Quarter Mile Lane School (744; PreK-8), West Avenue School, (552; K-8) and Bridgeton High School (1,560; 9–12). Students from Downe Township and some students from Lawrence Township attend the district's high school for ninth through twelfth grades as part of sending/receiving relationships; Other students from Lawrence Township are sent to Millville Senior High School.

Students are also eligible to attend Cumberland County Technical Education Center in Millville, serving students from the entire county in its full-time technical training programs, which are offered without charge to students who are county residents. Previously the school (formerly Cumberland County Technical Education Center) was a part-time school in Deerfield Township, and it had a Bridgeton postal address. It moved to its current location and became full time in 2016.

== Transportation ==
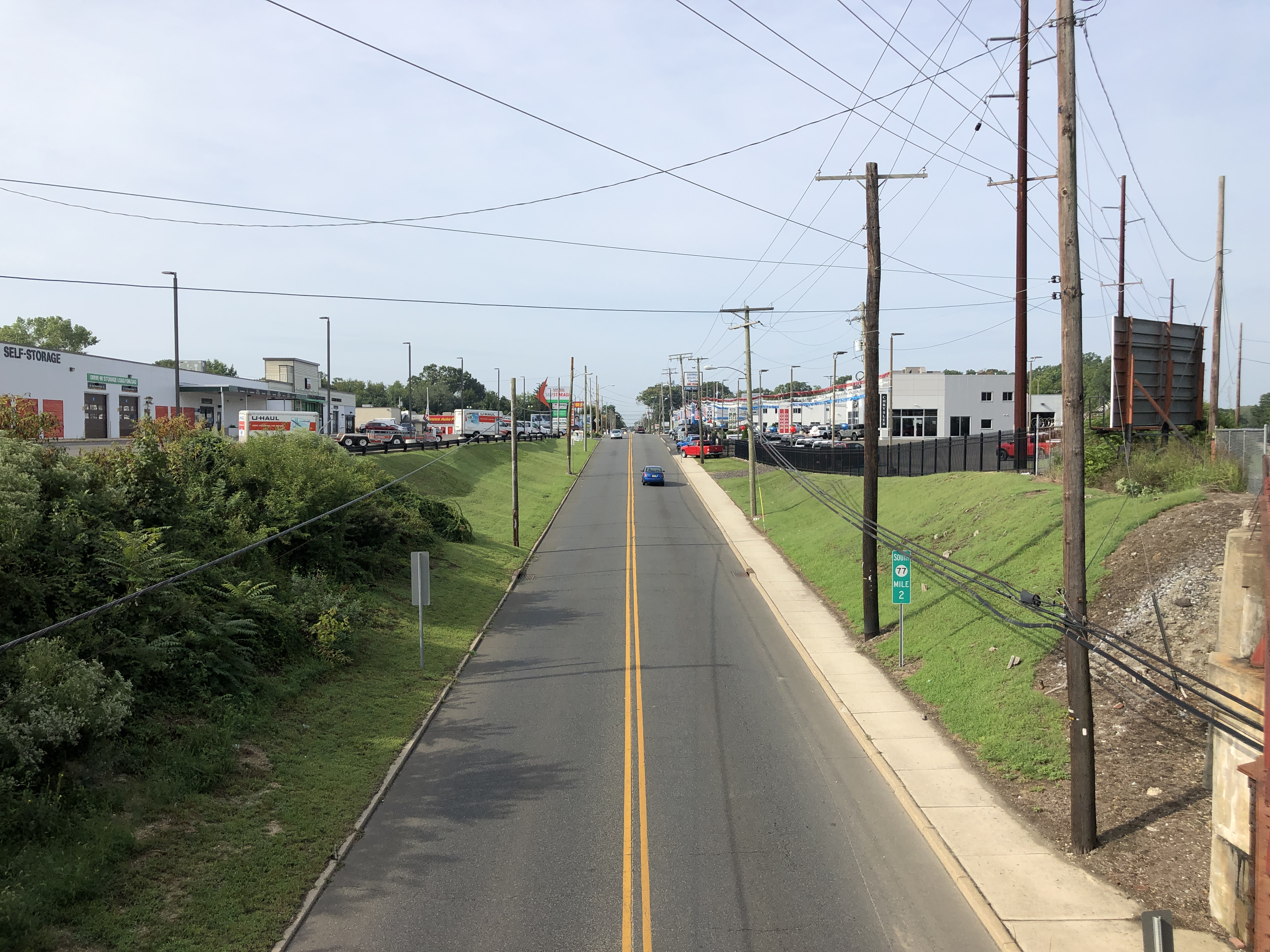
Route 77 southbound in Bridgeton

=== Roads and highways ===
As of May 2010, the city had a total of 71.95 miles (115.79 km) of roadways, of which 46.36 miles (74.61 km) were maintained by the municipality, 20.62 miles (33.18 km) by Cumberland County and 4.97 miles (8.00 km) by the New Jersey Department of Transportation.

Route 49 and Route 77 are the main highways serving Bridgeton. County Route 552 also traverses the city.

=== Public transportation ===
NJ Transit offers service on the 410 route between Bridgeton and Philadelphia, and the 553 route between Upper Deerfield Township and Atlantic City.

There is also a shuttle along Landis Avenue to Vineland and a local shuttle that circulates between Bridgeton and Upper Deerfield Township.

=== Airports ===
Bucks Airport is located 3.5 miles (5.6 km) northeast of the central business district of Bridgeton. Li Calzi Airport, which was located 2.3 miles (3.7 km) south of the central business district of Bridgeton, closed in 2008.

== Places of interest ==
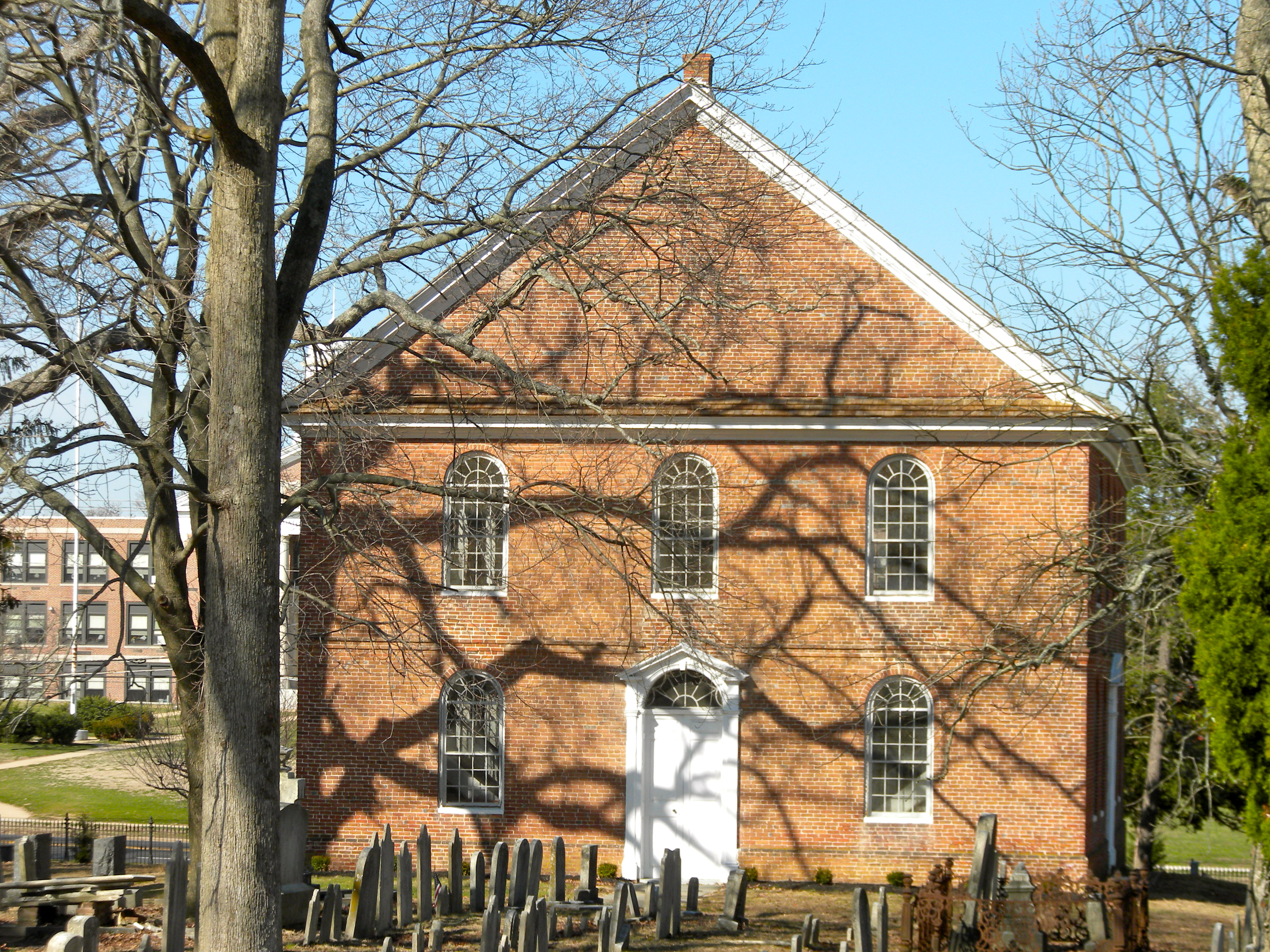
Old Broad Street Presbyterian

- Old Broad Street Presbyterian Church and Cemetery, the church was completed in 1795; the cemetery is the burial site of six U.S. Congressman, and a Governor of New Jersey
- Potter's Tavern – Revolutionary War-era tavern where local patriots met and The Plain Dealer newspaper was published
- "7 Sisters" – oldest row of commercial buildings in Bridgeton
- New Sweden Farmstead Museum, open-air museum in City Park
- Old Brearly Lodge F&AM No.2-Oldest functioning Masonic lodge in New Jersey

== Notable people ==
People who were born in, residents of, or otherwise closely associated with Bridgeton include:

- Jonathan Adler (born 1966), designer
- Ryquell Armstead (born 1996), football running back for the Jacksonville Jaguars of the NFL
- Radcliffe Bailey (born 1968), contemporary artist noted for mixed-media, paint, and sculpture works that explore African-American history
- Newton Bateman (1822–1897), academic, educational administrator, and editor
- Markquese Bell (born 1999), American football safety for the Dallas Cowboys of the National Football League.
- Robin Bernstein (born 1953), Florida businesswoman who has been confirmed as United States Ambassador to the Dominican Republic
- Ella Reeve Bloor (1862–1951), radical labor organizer
- Frank L. Bodine (1874–c. 1930), architect who practiced in Asbury Park, New Jersey, and in Orlando, Florida, in the first four decades of the twentieth century
- John Borican (1913–1942), long-distance runner
- Charles Brown (1797–1883), member of the United States House of Representatives from Pennsylvania
- Lester R. Brown (born 1934), environmentalist, founder and president of the Earth Policy Institute
- Benjamin Champneys (1800–1871), Pennsylvania State Representative, Pennsylvania State Senator and Pennsylvania Attorney General from 1846 to 1848
- Nadia Davy (born 1980), track and field athlete, competing internationally for Jamaica, who was a bronze medalist in the 4 × 400 m relay at the 2004 Olympic Games in Athens
- Julie Ann Dawson (born 1971), horror fiction writer, role-playing game designer and publisher
- Braheme Days Jr. (born 1995), shot putter who won a bronze medal at the 2011 World Youth Championships in Athletics
- E. E. Downham (1839–1921), businessman, miner and politician, who was mayor of Alexandria, Virginia, from 1887 to 1891
- Lucius Elmer (1793–1883), politician who represented New Jersey's 1st congressional district from 1843 to 1845
- Charles Ewing (1780–1832), politician who served as Chief Justice of the New Jersey Supreme Court
- Douglas H. Fisher (born 1947), New Jersey Secretary of Agriculture, member of the New Jersey General Assembly who represented the 3rd Legislative District and served on the Bridgeton City Council from 1990 to 1992
- James Galanos (1924–2016), fashion designer
- James Giles (1759–1825), American military officer and lawyer, served as the Clerk of Cumberland County from 1788 to 1803.
- Goose Goslin (1900–1971), Baseball Hall of Fame left fielder who played for the Washington Senators, St. Louis Browns and Detroit Tigers, in a career that ran from 1921 to 1938
- Edward Everett Grosscup (1860–1933), chairman of the New Jersey Democratic State Committee from 1911 to 1919 and Treasurer of the State of New Jersey from 1913 to 1915
- James G. Hampton (1814–1861), represented New Jersey's 1st congressional district in the United States House of Representatives from 1845 to 1849
- Charles L. Harris (1834–1910), Union Army Brigadier General
- Charles Hill (1936–2021), diplomat and academic
- Alfred Ellet Hitchner (1882–1959), college football pioneer who was head coach of the Rutgers Scarlet Knights football team in 1904
- George Jamison (born 1962), NFL linebacker who played for the Detroit Lions
- Harvey Johnson (1919–1983), served as head coach for the National Football League's Buffalo Bills
- Benjamin F. Lee (1841–1926), religious leader and educator, who was the president of Wilberforce University from 1876 to 1884
- Carwood Lipton (1920–2001), commissioned officer with the 101st Airborne Division during World War II, who was portrayed by Donnie Wahlberg in the HBO miniseries Band of Brothers
- Frank LoBiondo (born 1946), Congressman who represents New Jersey's 2nd congressional district
- Brison Manor (1952–2023), defensive lineman who played eight seasons in the National Football League for the Denver Broncos, from 1977 to 1984
- Bloomfield H. Minch (1864–1929), President of the New Jersey Senate
- Rube Oldring (1884–1961), professional baseball player who played outfield in the MLB from 1905 to 1918 for the Philadelphia Athletics and New York Yankees
- Harold E. Pierce (1922–2006), dermatologist and cosmetic surgeon
- Steve Rammel (born 1968), retired U.S. soccer forward who played two seasons in Major League Soccer
- Floyd Reid (1927–1994), running back who played in the NFL for the Green Bay Packers from 1950 to 1956
- Jerame Reid (1978–2014), killed by Bridgeton police officers
- Celeste Riley (born 1960), Clerk of Cumberland County, who was the first woman to represent the 3rd Legislative District
- Charles C. Seabrook (1909–2003), executive who was an earlier pioneer in frozen food.
- Elias P. Seeley (1791–1846), 11th Governor of New Jersey in 1833
- Oberlin Smith (1840–1926), engineer and inventor
- John J. Spoltore (1921–1973), Republican Party politician who served as Chairman of the New Jersey Republican State Committee in 1973 after having served four years as Mayor of Bridgeton in the mid-1950s
- Thomas Whitaker Trenchard (1863–1942), lawyer and a Justice of the New Jersey Supreme Court between 1906 and 1941, who was presiding judge in the Lindbergh kidnapping trial of Richard Hauptmann
- Aharon Wasserman (born 1986), entrepreneur and software designer
- Melinda Watts (born 1978), urban contemporary gospel artist and musician
- Dominique Williams (born 1990), running back for the Calgary Stampeders
- Shana Williams (born 1972), former track and field athlete who competed in the long jump
- Jason Winrow (1971–2012), offensive guard who played for the New York Giants
- H. Boyd Woodruff (1917–2017), soil microbiologist who discovered actinomycin and developed industrial production by fermentation of many natural products, including cyanocobalamin (a synthetic form of Vitamin B12), the avermectins and other important antibiotics

== See also ==
- Bridgeton, New Jersey Flood of 1934
- Columbia Township, New Jersey
