= Killing of Antonio Martin =

2014 police killing in Berkeley, Missouri

- Undated photo of Martin
- Date: December 23, 2014; 11 years ago
- Location: Berkeley, Missouri, U.S.; 38.7630°N 90.3365°W
- Type: Shooting by law enforcement
- Participants: Unidentified officer; Antonio Martin (deceased); Unidentified man (allegedly accompanied Martin)
- Deaths: 1 (Martin)

On December 23, 2014, Antonio Martin, an 18-year-old African American, was fatally shot by a white police officer when Martin pulled a gun on him at a gas station in Berkeley, Missouri, a suburb of St. Louis. The incident sparked protests in the St. Louis area and other cities in the United States. The incident also elicited comparison to the earlier shooting death of Michael Brown two miles away in Ferguson, Missouri.

== Incident ==
On the night of December 23, 2014, a Berkeley Police Department officer responded to an employee's emergency phone call report at 11:11 pm of shoplifting by two men at a Mobil On the Run convenience store along the 6800 block of North Hanley Road. An unidentified officer arrived at 11:15 p.m. in his police cruiser and saw two men just outside the store who matched the description of the suspects.

The shooting happened in a parking lot outside a Mobil gas station. The police officer was not wearing a body camera and there were no shots fired by the teen's gun. As the officer fired, he fell to the ground while running away, which was caught on video by the store's security cameras. One of the shots fired by the officer struck Martin, another struck the tire of the officer's vehicle, and the third is unaccounted for.

== Evidence ==
Police recovered a Hi-Point 9mm handgun from the scene, said to be Martin's, with five rounds in the magazine and one round in the chamber.

Footage of the incident was captured by surveillance cameras outside the convenience store. According to police, several witness' accounts back up the officer's story that Martin was first to draw his weapon. The officer said he was not wearing the body camera he had been issued earlier that day. The police car's dash-camera was likely not recording at the time.

== Investigation ==
The officer is identified as a 34-year-old white male, and a six-year veteran of the department. He had previously Served with the Country Club Hills, Missouri Police Department. He is represented by attorney Brian Millikan who also represents St. Louis police officer Jason Flanery in the October killing of VonDeritt Myers.

St. Louis County Prosecuting Attorney Robert McCulloch assigned a prosecutor to the county's investigation. The City of Berkeley will conduct its own independent investigation.

== Aftermath ==
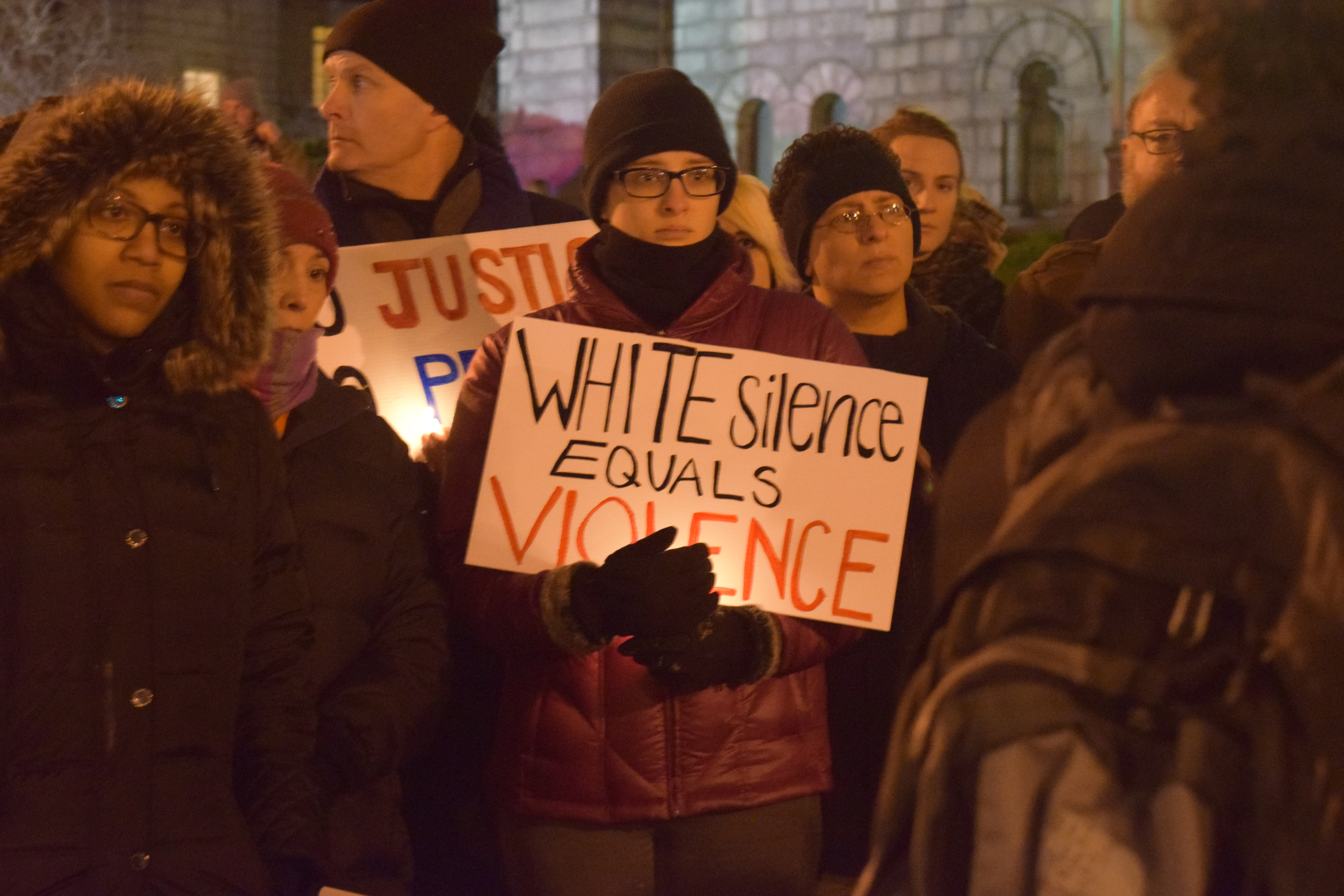
Vigilers outside the Cathedral Basilica

Despite complaints about the timeliness of medical attention to arrive, paramedics arrived six minutes after the shooting. Martin was declared dead, and his body covered, by 11:28 p.m. A crowd of onlookers and protesters gathered at the scene within 20 minutes of the shooting. The county crimes against persons unit arrived at 12:15 a.m. As the crowd grew angry, protesters clashed with law enforcement working to protect the scene for investigators collecting evidence. The crowd grew to an estimated 300 people as tensions escalated. Some threw rocks and other projectiles at them.

Media crews and surveillance video recorded an individual lighting fires with lighter fluid inside and outside the same store when looters broke in. Police say 19-year-old Joshua Williams of St. Louis was the individual. Williams, a frequently quoted advocate for peace in the aftermath of the Michael Brown shooting, was charged days later with arson in the first degree, a felony; felony burglary and misdemeanor stealing. On video Williams confessed to police of lighting the fires. Four others were arrested for assault-related offenses. Martin's body was removed from the crime scene at around 1:40 a.m. Several protesters lingered at the site throughout the night.

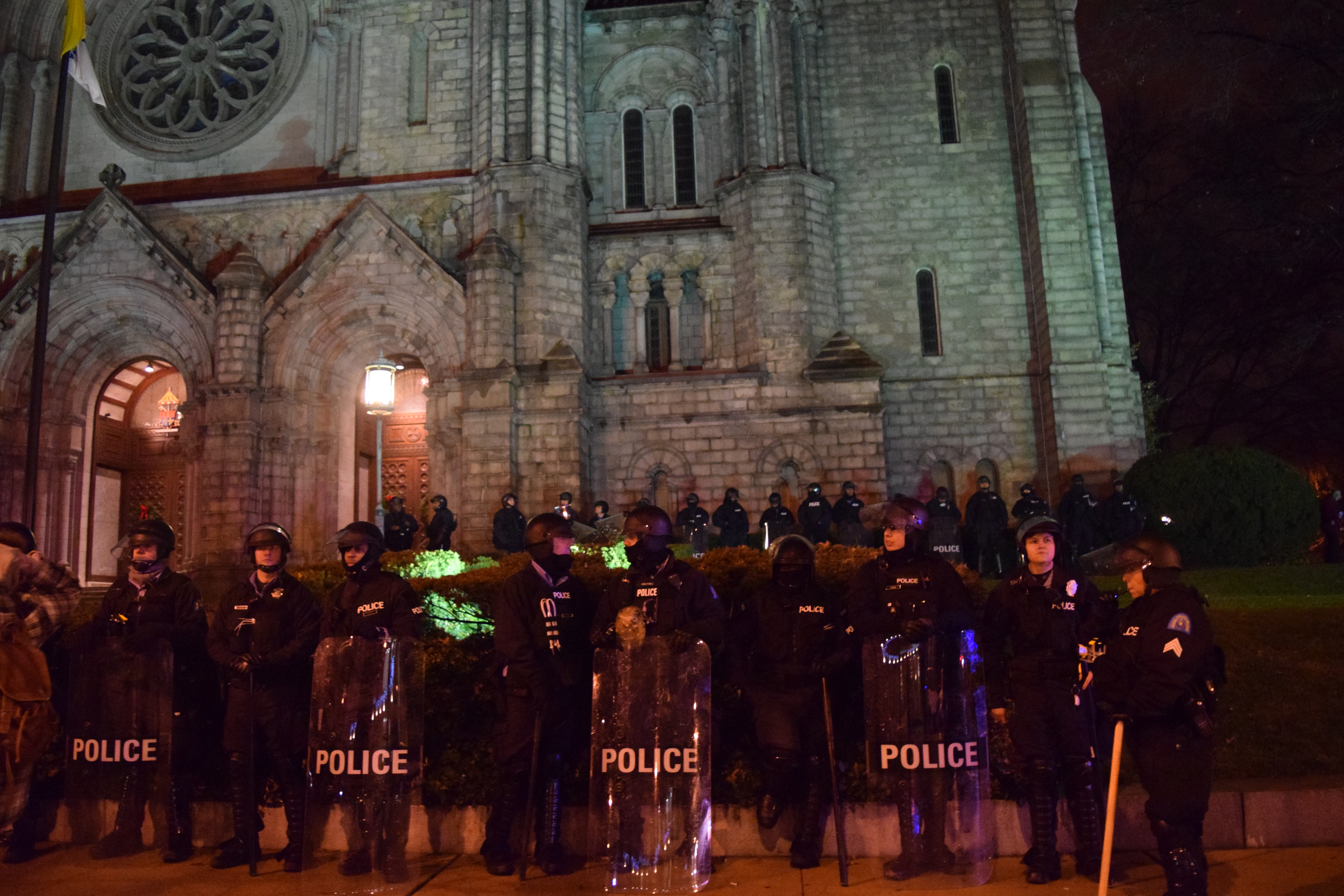
Riot police outside the Cathedral Basilica

Police were seeking the unidentified second suspect who fled the scene as a "person of interest". Two other bystanders at the scene were identified as witnesses. Martin's girlfriend was among those at the scene at the time of the shooting.

The night after the incident, dozens of people, including Martin's mother and stepfather, gathered near the scene where Martin was killed to chant and protest. Some in the group broke away to block traffic on the nearby Interstate 170. Law enforcement attempted to subdue the protesters with pepper spray. At least two were arrested.

Outside the Cathedral Basilica of Saint Louis about 75 vigilers held a moment of silence for Martin and others. St. Louis Police officers in riot gear stood ready in front of the cathedral.
