= America's Most Endangered Rivers =

List of threatened rivers in the United States

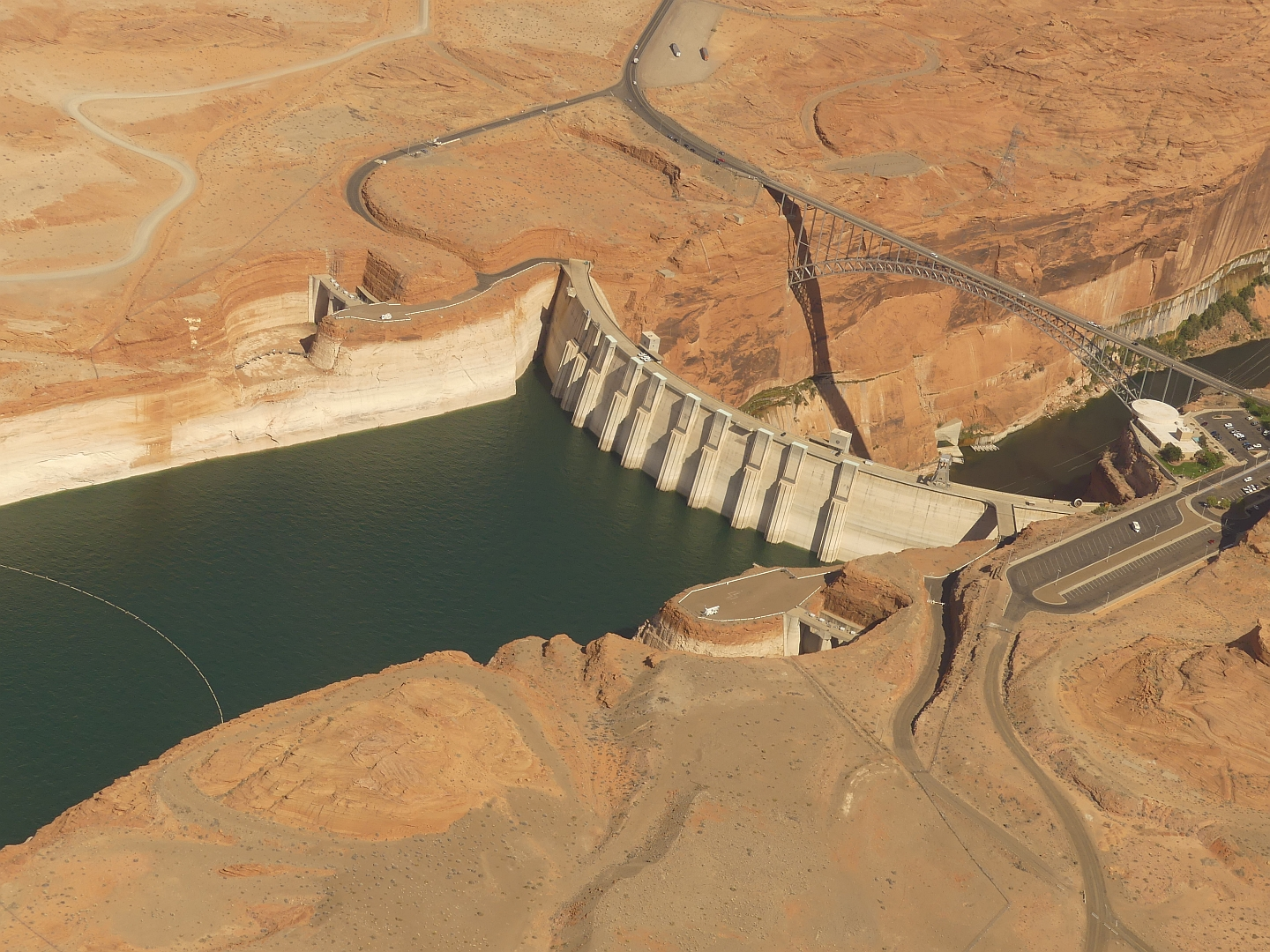
The Colorado River has been named America's Most Endangered River seven times.

America's Most Endangered Rivers is a list of threatened rivers in the United States compiled by the nonprofit group American Rivers. First published in 1984, the annual list spotlights ten threatened rivers–rivers that are facing environmental degradation due to existing or proposed development projects. The list is intended to build public awareness and spur action toward addressing specific environmental issues.

== Most-listed rivers ==
A number of rivers have been listed on America's Most Endangered Rivers multiple times, either in whole or in part. This list includes items that have appeared three or more times.

Times listed	River	First listed	Last listed
14	Snake River	1991	2023
13	Mississippi River	1991	2025
12	Colorado River	1991	2023
12	Missouri River	1994	2021
9	Columbia River	1988	2015
8	Penobscot River	1989	1996
6	American River	1988	1996
6	Big Sunflower River	2002	2024
6	Klamath River	1987	2003
6	Rio Grande	1993	2025
6	San Joaquin River	1997	2026
5	Animas River	1988	2001
5	Chattahoochee River	1996	2016
5	Platte River	1987	2003
5	Rogue River	1993	2026
5	Susquehanna River	1988	2016
4	Alsek River	1990	1993
4	Boundary Waters	2013	2026
4	Coosa River	1999	2022
4	Flint River	2000	2016
4	Hudson River	1996	2019
4	Kansas River	1995	2012
4	Passaic River	1990	2025
4	Potomac River	1997	2026
4	Tatshenshini River	1990	1993
3	Apalachicola River	2000	2016
3	Black River	1986	1988
3	Rivers of Bristol Bay	2006	2018
3	Catawba River	2001	2013
3	Chilkat River	2019	2026
3	Clarks Fork Yellowstone River	1994	1996
3	Coal River	1999	2012
3	Pearl River	2008	2023
3	Gila River	2008	2019
3	Kern River	1986	2022
3	Little Bighorn River	1987	1989
3	Merrimack River	1986	2016
3	Niobrara River	1986	2013
3	Pinto Creek	1996	1998
3	Skykomish River	2005	2017
3	Smith River (Montana)	2015	2018
3	South Fork Salmon River	2018	2020
3	Tallapoosa River	1999	2003
3	White Salmon River	1996	2007

== Lists ==
=== 2026 rivers ===
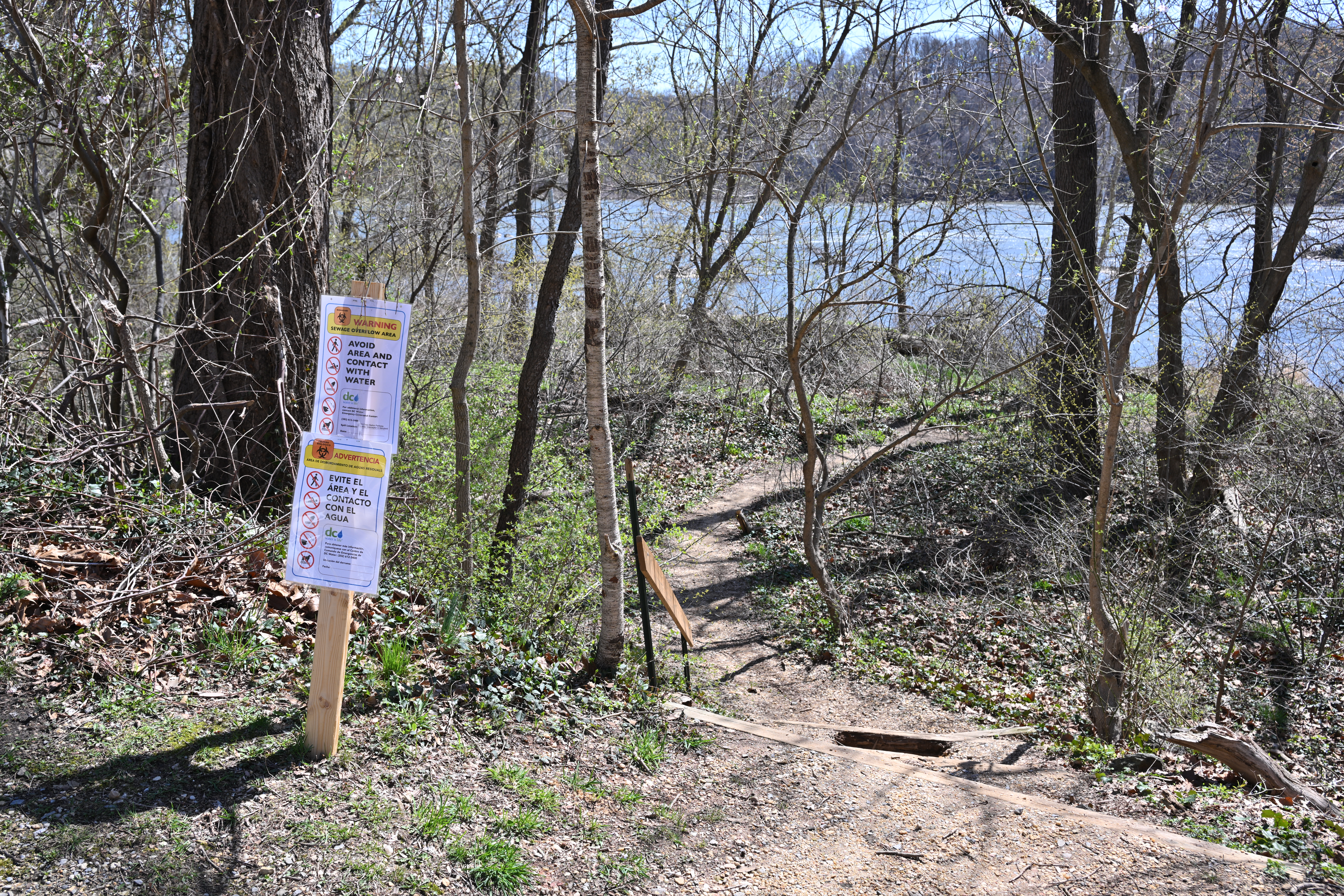
Warning sign on the Potomac River posted during the 2026 sewage spill

On April 14, 2026, American Rivers announced its ten most endangered rivers of 2026.

Rank	River	State(s)	Threats
1	Potomac River	MD, VA, DC	Data center construction and a major sewage spill
2	San Joaquin River	CA	Proposed gravel mine
3	Boundary Waters	MN	Twin Metals mine
4	Lumber River	NC, SC	PFAS pollution
5	Rogue River	OR	Mining pollution and potential roadless rule rollback
6	Chilkat River	AK	Hard rock mine development
7	Nissequogue River	NY	Reconstruction of a failed dam
8	Dan River	NC, VA	Pipeline construction
9	Amargosa River	CA, NV	Mining operations
10	Suwannee River	FL, GA	Overuse and pollution

=== 2025 rivers ===
On April 15, 2025, American Rivers announced its ten most endangered rivers of 2025.

Rank	River	State(s)	Threats
1	Mississippi River	MN, WI, IL, IA, MO, KY, TN, AR, MS, LA	Changes to FEMA and other federal agencies impacting flood prevention and response
2	Tijuana River	CA	Severe chemical, sewage, and trash pollution
3	Rivers of Southern Appalachia	NC, SC, TN, GA	Flooding and landslides from Hurricane Helene and future storms
4	Passaic River	NJ, NY	Incomplete chemical pollution cleanup efforts
5	Lower Rio Grande	TX	Water scarcity and pollution
6	Rappahannock River	VA	Over-withdrawal due to increased water demand
7	Clearwater River Basin	ID	Pollution and habitat destruction from proposed logging, mining, and dam-building
8	Susitna River	AK	Pollution from road construction and petroleum extraction
9	Calcasieu River	LA	Pollution from chemical plants and oil refineries
10	Gauley River	WV	Pollution from strip mining in the Cherry River headwaters

=== 2024 rivers ===
On April 16, 2024, American Rivers announced its ten most endangered rivers of 2024.

Rank	River	State(s)	Threats
1	Rivers of New Mexico	NM	Loss of federal protections
2	Big Sunflower and Yazoo Rivers	MS	Pumping project
3	Duck River	TN	Over-withdrawal
4	Santa Cruz River	AZ	Scarcity, climate change
5	Pee Dee River	NC, SC	Development, road construction
6	Farmington River	CT, MA	Dam
7	Trinity River	CA	Mismanagement
8	Kobuk River	AK	Road construction, mining
9	Tijuana River	CA	Pollution
10	Blackwater River	WV	Highway development

=== 2023 rivers ===
On April 18, 2023, American Rivers announced its ten most endangered rivers of 2023.

Rank	River	State(s)	Threats
1	Grand Canyon of the Colorado River	AZ	Climate change, mismanagement
2	Ohio River	PA, OH, WV, KY, IN, IL	Pollution, climate change
3	Pearl River	MS	Dredging, dams
4	Snake River	ID, OR, WA	Dams
5	Clark Fork River	MT	Pollution
6	Eel River	CA	Dams
7	Lehigh River	PA	Development
8	Chilkat and Klehini Rivers	AK	Mining
9	Rio Gallinas	NM	Climate change, mismanagement
10	Okefenokee Swamp	GA, FL	Mining

=== 2022 rivers ===
On April 19, 2022, American Rivers announced its ten most endangered rivers of 2022.

Rank	River	State(s)	Threats
1	Colorado River	CO, UT, AZ, NV, CA, WY, NM	Climate change, mismanagement
2	Snake River	ID, OR, WA	Dams
3	Mobile River	AL	Pollution
4	Maine's Atlantic salmon rivers	ME	Dams
5	Coosa River	TN, GA, AL	Pollution
6	Mississippi River	MN, WI, IL, IA, MO, KY, TN, AR, MS, LA	Pollution, habitat loss
7	Lower Kern River	CA	Over-withdrawal
8	San Pedro River	AZ	Over-withdrawal
9	Los Angeles River	CA	Development, pollution
10	Tar Creek	OK	Pollution

=== 2021 rivers ===
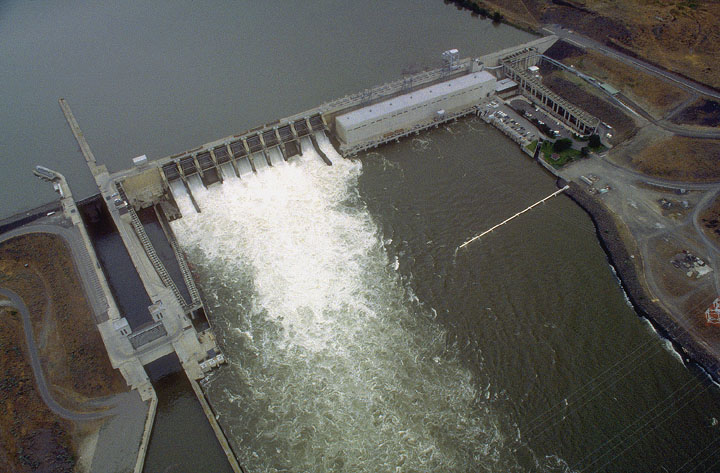
The Ice Harbor Dam, one of four dams on the Lower Snake River causing it to top the 2021 list.

On April 13, 2021, American Rivers announced its ten most endangered rivers of 2021.

Rank	River	State(s)	Threats
1	Snake River	ID, OR, WA	Dams
2	Lower Missouri River	MO, IA, NE, KS	Mismanagement, climate change
3	Boundary Waters	MN	Mining
4	South River	GA	Pollution
5	Pecos River	NM	Mining
6	Tar Creek	OK	Pollution
7	McCloud River	CA	Dams
8	Ipswich River	MA	Over-withdrawal
9	Raccoon River	IA	Pollution
10	Turkey Creek	MS	Development

=== 2020 rivers ===
On April 14, 2020, American Rivers announced its ten most endangered rivers of 2020.

Rank	River	State(s)	Threats
1	Upper Mississippi River	MN, WI, IL, IA	Climate change, mismanagement
2	Lower Missouri River	MO, IA, NE, KS	Climate change, mismanagement
3	Big Sunflower River	MS	Habitat loss
4	Puyallup River	WA	Dams
5	South Fork Salmon River	ID	Mining
6	Menominee River	MI, WI	Mining
7	Rapid Creek	SD	Mining
8	Okefenokee Swamp and St. Marys River	GA, FL	Mining
9	Ocklawaha River	FL	Dams
10	Lower Youghiogheny River	PA	Natural gas

=== 2019 rivers ===
On April 16, 2019, American Rivers announced its ten most endangered rivers of 2019.

Rank	River	State(s)	Threats
1	Gila River	NM	Over-withdrawal
2	Hudson River	NY	Storm-surge barrier
3	Upper Mississippi River	IL, IA, MO	Levees
4	Green-Duwamish River	WA	Habitat loss
5	Willamette River	OR	Dams
6	Chilkat River	AK	Mining
7	South Fork Salmon River	ID	Mining
8	Buffalo National River	AR	Pollution
9	Big Darby Creek	OH	Development
10	Stikine River	AK	Mining

=== 2018 rivers ===
On April 11, 2018, American Rivers announced its ten most endangered rivers of 2018.

Rank	River	State(s)	Threats
1	Big Sunflower River	MS	Pumping project
2	Rivers of Bristol Bay	AK	Mining
3	Boundary Waters	MN	Mining
4	Lower Rio Grande	TX	Habitat loss
5	South Fork Salmon River	ID	Mining
6	Mississippi River Gorge	MN	Dams
7	Smith River	MT	Mining
8	Colville River	AK	Development
9	Middle Fork Vermilion River	IL	Pollution
10	Kinnickinnic River (St. Croix River tributary)	WI	Dams

=== 2017 rivers ===
On April 11, 2017, American Rivers announced its ten most endangered rivers of 2017.

Rank	River	State(s)	Threats
1	Lower Colorado River	AZ, NV, CA	Climate change, over-withdrawal
2	Bear River	CA	Dams
3	South Fork Skykomish River	WA	Hydropower
4	Rivers of Mobile Bay	AL, GA, MS	Mismanagement
5	Rappahannock River	VA	Fracking
6	Green-Toutle River	WA	Mining
7	Neuse and Cape Fear Rivers	NC	Livestock pollution
8	Middle Fork Flathead River	MT	Oil transport
9	Buffalo National River	AR	Livestock pollution
10	Menominee River	MI, WI	Mining

=== 2016 rivers ===
In April 2016, American Rivers announced its ten most endangered rivers of 2016.

Rank	River	State(s)	Threats
1	Apalachicola-Chattahoochee-Flint River Basin	AL, FL, GA	Mismanagement
2	San Joaquin River	CA	Mismanagement
3	Susquehanna River	PA	Dams
4	Smith River	MT	Mining
5	Green-Duwamish River	WA	Dams, pollution
6	Pee Dee River	NC	Dams
7	Russell Fork River	KY, WV	Mining
8	Merrimack River	MA, NH	Pollution
9	St. Lawrence River	NY	Dams
10	Pascagoula River	MS, AL	Dams

=== 2015 rivers ===
On April 7, 2015, American Rivers announced its ten most endangered rivers of 2015.

Rank	River	State(s)	Threats
1	Grand Canyon of the Colorado River	AZ	Development, mining, groundwater depletion
2	Columbia River	WA, OR	Dams
3	Holston River	TN	Pollution
4	Smith River	MT	Mining
5	Edisto River	SC	Over-withdrawal
6	Chuitna River	AK	Mining
7	Rogue and Smith Rivers	OR, CA	Mining
8	St. Louis River	MN	Mining
9	Harpeth River	TN	Pollution, over-withdrawal
10	Pearl River	MS, LA	Dams

=== 2014 rivers ===
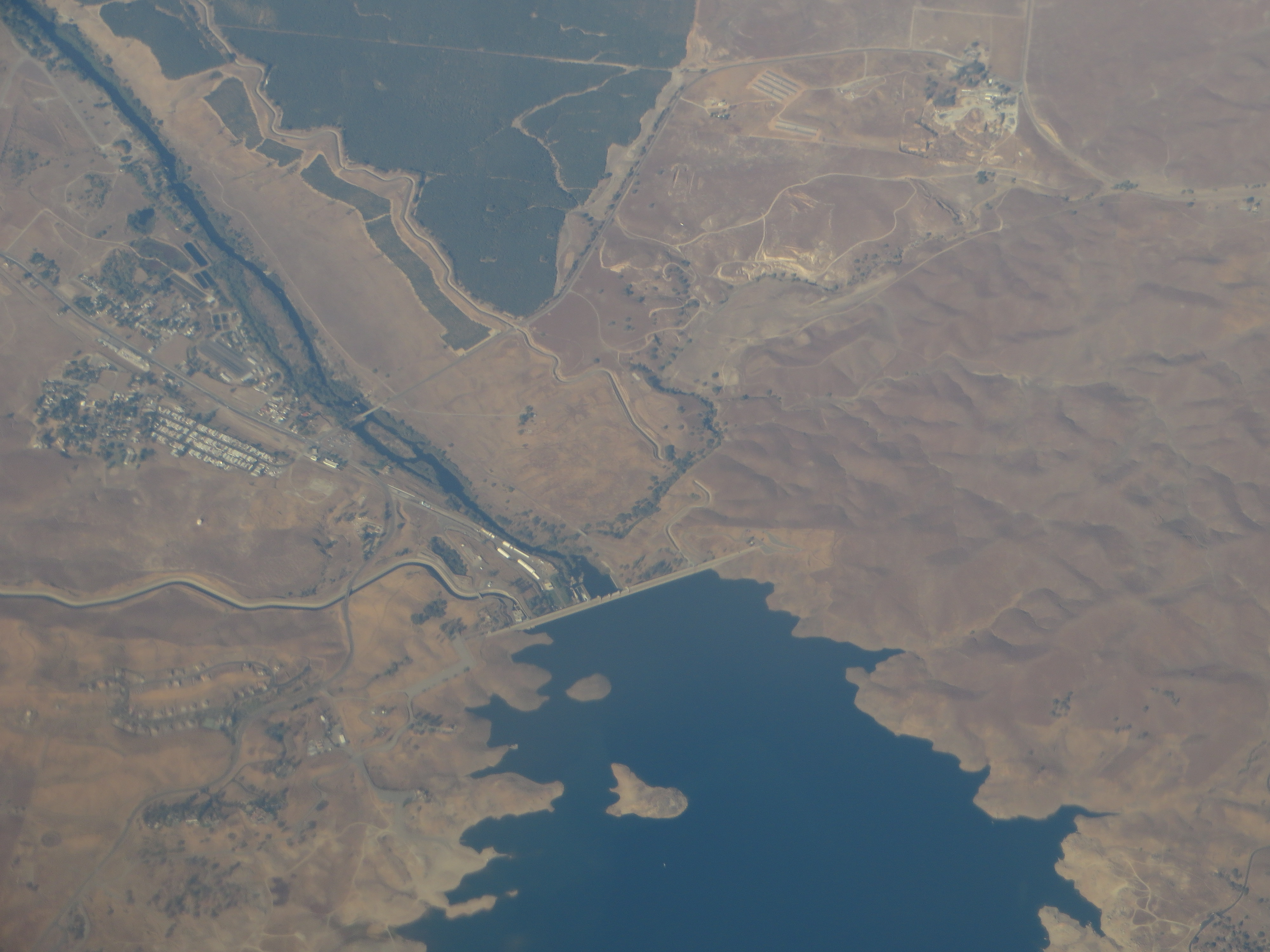
Friant Dam diverting much of the San Joaquin River into irrigation canals. Water mismanagement led to the San Joaquin topping the 2014 list.

On April 9, 2014, American Rivers announced its ten most endangered rivers of 2014.

Rank	River	State(s)	Threats
1	San Joaquin River	CA	Mismanagement
2	Upper Colorado River	CO	Water diversions
3	Middle Mississippi River	MO, IL, KY	Mismanagement
4	Gila River	NM	Water diversions
5	San Francisquito Creek	CA	Dams
6	South Fork Edisto River	SC	Over-withdrawal
7	White River (Colorado)	CO	Petroleum development
8	White River (Washington)	WA	Dams
9	Haw River	NC	Pollution
10	Clearwater and Lochsa Rivers	ID	Industrializaton

=== 2013 rivers ===
In April 2013, American Rivers announced its ten most endangered rivers of 2013.

Rank	River	State(s)	Threats
1	Colorado River	CO, UT, AZ, NV, CA, WY, NM	Mismanagement
2	Flint River	GA	Mismanagement
3	San Saba River	TX	Mismanagement
4	Little Plover River	WI	Mismanagement
5	Catawba River	NC, SC	Coal ash pollution
6	Boundary Waters	MN	Mining
7	Black Warrior River	AL	Mining
8	Rough & Ready and Baldface Creeks	OR	Mining
9	Kootenai River	MT, ID	Mining
10	Niobrara River	NE, SD, WY	Sedimentation

=== 2012 rivers ===
In May 2012, American Rivers announced its ten most endangered rivers of 2012.

Rank	River	State(s)	Threats
1	Potomac River	MD, VA, PA, WV, DC	Pollution
2	Green River	WY, UT, CO	Pumping project
3	Chattahoochee River	GA	Dams
4	Missouri River	CO, IA, KS, MN, MO, MT, NE, ND, SD, WY	Mismanagement
5	Hoback River	WY	Natural gas
6	Grand River	OH	Natural gas
7	South Fork Skykomish River	WA	Dams
8	Crystal River	CO	Dams
9	Coal River	WV	Mining
10	Kansas River	KS	Dredging

=== 2011 rivers ===
In May 2011, American Rivers announced its ten most endangered rivers of 2011.

Rank	River	State(s)	Threats
1	Susquehanna River	NY, PA, MD	Natural gas
2	Rivers of Bristol Bay	AK	Mining
3	Roanoke River	VA, NC	Mining
4	Chicago River	IL	Sewage pollution
5	Yuba River	CA	Dams
6	Green River (North Fork Toutle River tributary)	WA	Mining
7	Hoback River	WY	Natural gas
8	Black Warrior River	AL	Mining
9	St. Croix River	WI, MN	Bridge project
10	Ozark National Scenic Riverways	MO	Overuse, mismanagement

=== 2010 rivers ===
On June 2, 2010, American Rivers announced its ten most endangered rivers of 2010.

Rank	River	State(s)	Threats
1	Upper Delaware River	NY, PA	Natural gas
2	Sacramento–San Joaquin River Delta	CA	Mismanagement
3	Gauley River	WV	Mining
4	Little River	NC	Dams
5	Cedar River	IA	Mismanagement
6	Upper Colorado River	CO	Water diversions
7	Chetco River	OR	Mining
8	Teton River	ID	Teton Dam reconstruction proposal
9	Monongahela River	PA, WV	Natural gas
10	Coosa River	AL	Dams

=== 2009 rivers ===
On April 7, 2009, American Rivers announced its ten most endangered rivers of 2009.

Rank	River	State(s)	Threats
1	Sacramento and San Joaquin Rivers	CA	Mismanagement
2	Flint River	GA	Dams
3	Lower Snake River	ID, OR, WA	Dams
4	Mattawoman Creek	MD	Development
5	North Fork Flathead River	MT	Proposed mines
6	Saluda River	SC	Sewage pollution
7	Laurel Hill Creek	PA	Over-withdrawal
8	Beaver Creek	AK	Proposed petroleum development
9	Pascagoula River	MS	Proposed petroleum storage project
10	Lower St. Croix National Scenic Riverway	MN, WI	Development

=== 2008 rivers ===
In May 2008, American Rivers announced its ten most endangered rivers of 2008.

Rank	River	State(s)	Threats
1	Catawba-Wateree River	NC, SC	Mismanagement
2	Rogue River	OR	Logging, road construction
3	Cache la Poudre River	CO	Water diversion, dams
4	St. Lawrence River	NY	Dams
5	Minnesota River	MN	Proposed power plant
6	St. Johns River	FL	Over-withdrawal
7	Gila River	NM, AZ	Proposed water diversion
8	Allagash Wilderness Waterway	ME	Proposed removal of legal protection
9	Pearl River	MS, LA	Floodplain development
10	Niobrara River	WY, NE	Irrigation diversions

=== 2007 rivers ===
In April 2007, American Rivers announced its ten most endangered rivers of 2007.

Rank	River	State(s)	Threats
1	Santa Fe River	NM	Mismanagement
2	San Mateo Creek (Southern California)	CA	Proposed highway
3	Iowa River	IA	Pollution
4	Upper Delaware River	NY	Proposed power line
5	White Salmon River	WA	Condit Dam
6	Neches River	TX	Proposed dams
7	Kinnickinnic River (Milwaukee River tributary)	WI	Toxic sediments
8	Neuse River	NC	Development
9	Lee Creek	AR, OK	Proposed dam
10	Chuitna River	AK	Proposed coal mine

=== 2006 rivers ===
In April 2006, American Rivers announced its ten most endangered rivers of 2006.

Rank	River	State(s)	Threats
1	Pajaro River	CA	Flood control project
2	Upper Yellowstone River	MT	Floodplain development
3	Willamette River	OR	Pollution
4	Salmon Trout River	MI	Proposed mine
5	Shenandoah River	VA, WV	Overdevelopment
6	Boise River	ID	Proposed mine
7	Caloosahatchee River	FL	Toxic water discharge from Lake Okeechobee
8	Rivers of Bristol Bay	AK	Proposed mining district
9	San Jacinto River	TX	Unregulated sand mining
10	Verde River	AZ	Proposed groundwater pumping

=== 2005 rivers ===
In April 2005, American Rivers announced its ten most endangered rivers of 2005.

Rank	River	State(s)	Threats
1	Susquehanna River	NY, PA, MD	Sewage pollution, proposed dam
2	McCrystal Creek	NM	Proposed methane drilling
3	Fraser River	CO	Proposed increase in water withdrawal
4	Skykomish River	WA	Overdevelopment
5	Roan Creek	TN	Proposed factory dairy farm
6	Santee River	SC	Over-withdrawal
7	Little Miami River	OH	Pollution
8	Tuolumne River	CA	Proposed increase in water withdrawal
9	Price River	UT	Proposed dam and dewatering
10	Santa Clara River	CA	Overdevelopment

=== 2004 rivers ===
In April 2004, American Rivers announced its ten most endangered rivers of 2004.

Rank	River	State(s)	Threats
1	Colorado River	CO, UT, NV, AZ, CA	Pollution
2	Big Sunflower River	MS	Proposed drainage and dredging project
3	Snake River	WY, ID, OR, WA	Dams
4	Tennessee River	TN, AL, MS, KY	Sewage pollution
5	Allegheny and Monongahela Rivers	PA, WV, NY	Coal mine pollution
6	Spokane River	ID, WA	Over-withdrawal, pollution
7	Housatonic River	MA, CT	Polychlorinated biphenyl pollution
8	Peace River	FL	Phosphate mine pollution
9	Big Darby Creek	OH	Overdevelopment
10	Mississippi River	MN, WI, IL, IA, MO, KY, TN, AR, MS, LA	Dams, levees, pollution

=== 2003 rivers ===
In April 2003, American Rivers announced its ten most endangered rivers of 2003.

Rank	River	State(s)	Threats
1	Big Sunflower River	MS	Proposed drainage and dredging project
2	Klamath River	CA, OR	Irrigation withdrawals, dams, pollution
3	Ipswich River	MA	Groundwater pumping, over-withdrawal
4	Gunnison River	CO	Over-withdrawal
5	Rio Grande	CO, NM, TX	Diversion and over-withdrawal
6	Mattaponi River	VA	Proposed dam
7	Platte River	WY, CO, NE	Proposed water supply development
8	Snake River	ID, OR, WA	Dams
9	Tallapoosa River	AL, GA	Dams, overallocation
10	Trinity River	TX	Proposed flood control project, floodplain development

=== 2002 rivers ===
On April 4, 2002, American Rivers announced its eleven most endangered rivers of 2002.

Rank	River	State(s)	Threats
1	Missouri River	MT, ND, SD, MO, IA, NE, KS	Habitat loss from unnatural dam operations
2	Big Sunflower River	MS	Proposed drainage and dredging project
3	Klamath River	CA, OR	Irrigation withdrawals, dams, pollution
4	Kansas River	KS	Agricultural pollution
5	White River	AR	Irrigation project, proposed navigation project
6	Powder River	WY	Coal bed methane pollution
7	Altamaha River	GA	Over-withdrawal
8	Allagash Wilderness Waterway	ME	Proposed loss of legal protections
9	Canning River	AK	Proposed petroleum development
10	Guadalupe River	TX	Proposed over-withdrawal
11	Apalachicola River	FL	Dredging

=== 2001 rivers ===
On April 11, 2001, American Rivers announced its thirteen most endangered rivers of 2001.

Rank	River	State(s)	Threats
1	Missouri River	MT, ND, SD, MO, IA, NE, KS	Habitat loss from unnatural dam operations
2	Canning River	AK	Proposed petroleum development
3	Eel River	CA	Dams
4	Hudson River	NY	Polychlorinated biphenyl pollution
5	Powder River	WY	Coal bed methane pollution
6	Mississippi River	MN, WI, IL, IA, MO, KY, TN, AR, MS, LA	Proposed flood control project, wetlands destruction, pollution
7	Big Sandy River	WV, KY	Coal sludge spill
8	Snoqualmie River	WA	Overdevelopment
9	Animas River	CO, NM	Proposed water project
10	East Fork Lewis River	WA	Proposed gravel mine expansion
11	Paine Run	VA	Acid rain pollution
12	Hackensack River and Meadowlands	NJ, NY	Overdevelopment
13	Catawba River	NC, SC	Overdevelopment

=== 2000 rivers ===
On April 10, 2000, American Rivers announced its thirteen most endangered rivers of 2000.

Rank	River	State(s)	Threats
1	Snake River	ID, OR, WA	Dams
2	Missouri River	MT, ND, SD, MO, IA, NE, KS	Flood control works
3	Ventura River	CA	Matilija Dam
4	Copper River	AK	Proposed logging road
5	Apalachicola-Chattahoochee-Flint and Alabama-Coosa-Tallapoosa River Basins	AL, FL, GA	Tri-state water dispute, over-withdrawal, dams, urban sprawl, pollution
6	Coal River	WV	Mining
7	Rio Grande	CO, NM, TX	Pollution, dams, water demand
8	Snoqualmie River	WA	Overdevelopment
9	Mississippi and White Rivers	AR	Dredging proposal
10	Clear Creek	TX	Proposed flood control project
11	Green River	UT, CO	Flaming Gorge Dam
12	Presumpscot River	ME	Dams impeding American shad and Atlantic salmon migration
13	Clark Fork River	MT	Proposed silver and copper mine

=== 1999 rivers ===
Rank	River	State(s)	Threats
1	Lower Snake River	ID, OR, WA	Dams
2	Missouri River	MT, ND, SD, MO, IA, NE, KS	Flood control works
3	Alabama-Coosa-Tallapoosa River Basin	AL, GA	Overdevelopment over-withdrawal, pollution
4	San Pedro River	AZ	Overdevelopment, groundwater pumping
5	Yellowstone River	MT, ND	Channelization
6	Cedar River	WA	Overdevelopment, over-withdrawal
7	Fox River	IL, WI	Overdevelopment, pollution
8	Carmel River	CA	Overdevelopment, over-withdrawal, dams
9	Coal River	WV	Mining
10	Bear River	UT	Overdevelopment, over-withdrawal

=== 1998 rivers ===
On April 6, 1998, American Rivers announced its twenty most endangered rivers of 1998.

Rank	River	State(s)	Threats
1	Hanford Reach of the Columbia River	WA	Public land transfer, irrigation, nuclear waste
2	Missouri River	MT, ND, SD, MO, IA, NE, KS	Channelization, dams
3	Pocomoke River	DE, MD, VA	Agricultural pollution
4	Kern River	CA	Dams
5	Blackfoot River	MT	Proposed gold mine
6	Colorado River Delta	BCN, SON	Over-allocation
7	Chattahoochee River	AL, GA, FL	Overdevelopment, pollution
8	Lower Snake River	ID, OR, WA	Dams
9	Apple River	WI, IL	Factory hog farm pollution
10	Pinto Creek	AZ	Proposed copper mine
11	Wolf River	WI	Proposed mine
12	Potomac River	MD, VA, PA, WV, DC	Livestock pollution, overdevelopment
13	Rogue and Illinois Rivers, Elk and Rough & Ready Creeks	OR	Dams, proposed mine
14	Taku River	AK	Proposed mine
15	Crooked Creek	AR	In-stream gravel mining
16	Passaic River	NJ	Contaminated sediments
17	Mattaponi River	VA	Proposed water development project
18	Walla Walla River	OR, WA	Flow depletion, agricultural pollution, channelization
19	Uinta River	UT	Proposed diversion dam
20	Kansas River	KS	Pollution

=== 1997 rivers ===
On April 16, 1997, American Rivers announced its ten most endangered rivers of 1997.

Rank	River	State(s)	Threats
1	Missouri River	IA, KS, MN, MO, MT, NE, ND, SD	Navigation
2	Upper Hudson River	NY	Polychlorinated biphenyl pollution
3	White Salmon River	GA, AL, FL	Condit Dam
4	San Joaquin River	CA	Floodplain development, agricultural pollution
5	Wolf River	WI	Proposed mine
6	Pinto Creek	AZ	Proposed copper mine
7	Potomac River	MD, VA, PA, WV, DC	Livestock pollution, development
8	Mill Creek	OH	Industrialization, development, channelization
9	Lower Colorado River	AZ, NV, CA	Over-allocation
10	Tennessee River	TN, AL, MS, KY	Proposed elimination of the TVA's environmental protection programs

=== 1996 rivers ===
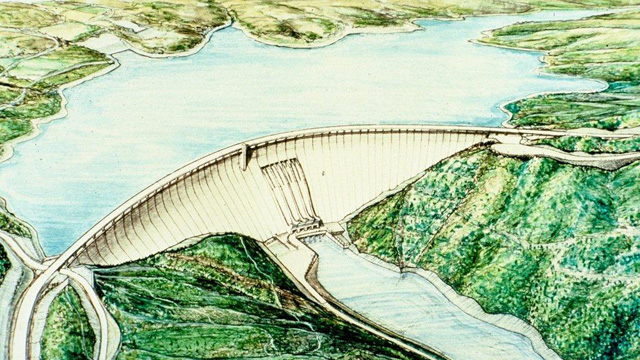
Rendering of the Auburn Dam proposed on the American River. The dam was ultimately never built.

On April 17, 1996, American Rivers announced its ten most endangered rivers of 1996.

Rank	River	State(s)	Threats
1	Clarks Fork Yellowstone River	WY, MT	Proposed New World Mine
2	American River	CA	Proposed Auburn Dam
3	Upper Chattahoochee and Etowah Rivers	GA, AL, FL	Sewage, development, sedimentation
4	Missouri River	CO, IA, KS, MN, MO, MT, NE, ND, SD, WY	Dams, pollution
5	Upper Hudson River	NY	Pollution, development, dams
6	Columbia, John Day, and White Salmon Rivers	ID, WA, OR	Grazing, irrigation diversions, logging, dams
7	Elk River	OR	Timber sales
8	Pinto Creek	AZ	Mining
9	Penobscot River	ME	Basin Mills Dam
10	Animas River	CO, NM	Water development project

=== 1995 rivers ===
Rank	River	State(s)	Threats
1	Clarks Fork Yellowstone River	WY, MT	Mine
2	Los Angeles River	CA	Flood control, neglect
3	Columbia and Snake Rivers	ID, WA, OR	Dams, irrigation
4	Animas River	CO	Water development project
5	Missouri River	CO, IA, KS, MN, MO, MT, NE, ND, SD, WY	Dams, channelization
6	Kansas River	KS	Agricultural runoff, sand dredging
7	Mississippi River	MN, WI, IL, IA, MO, KY, TN, AR, MS, LA	Flood control, runoff
8	Cheat River	WV	Acid mine drainage, proposed dam
9	Penobscot River	ME	Dams
10	Thorne River	AK	Logging

=== 1994 rivers ===
Rank	River	State(s)	Threats
1	Clarks Fork Yellowstone River	WY, MT	Mine
2	Anacostia River	DC, MD	Urban runoff
3	Clavey River	CA	Dams
4	Columbia and Snake Rivers	ID, WA, OR	Dams, logging
5	Mississippi River	MN, WI, IL, IA, MO, KY, TN, AR, MS, LA	Flood control, runoff
6	Missouri River	CO, IA, KS, MN, MO, MT, NE, ND, SD, WY	Dams, channelization
7	Penobscot River	ME	Proposed dam
8	Rio Grande	CO, NM, TX	Pollution, mine waste
9	Thorne River	AK	Logging
10	Virgin River	UT, AZ, NV	Diversions, development

=== 1993 rivers ===
Rank	River	State(s)	Threats
1	Rio Grande and Rio Conchos	CO, NM, TX	Pollution
2	Columbia, Snake, and Yakima Rivers	ID, WA, OR	Dams
3	Everglades	FL	Diversion, agricultural pollution
4	Anacostia River	DC, MD	Sewage, development, sedimentation, dumping
5	Virgin River	UT, AZ, NV	Dams
6	Rogue and Illinois	OR	Logging
7	Penobscot River	ME	Proposed dam
8	Clavey River	CA	Hydroelectric project
9	Alsek and Tatshenshini Rivers	AK	Proposed mine
10	Platte River	NE	Dam

=== 1992 rivers ===
Rank	River	State(s)	Threats
1	Columbia and Snake Rivers	ID, WA, OR	Dams
2	Alsek and Tatshenshini Rivers	AK	Proposed mine
3	Great Whale River	QC	Hydroelectric project
4	Everglades	FL	Flood control project
5	American River	CA	Proposed dam
6	Colorado River	AZ	Glen Canyon Dam
7	Mississippi River	MN, WI, IL, IA, MO, KY, TN, AR, MS, LA	Hydroelectric, barge spills, agriculture, industrial discharge
8	Penobscot River	ME	Proposed dam
9	Beaverkill River and Willowemoc Creek	NY	Logging, development
10	Blackfoot River	MT	Logging, grazing, agriculture, mining

=== 1991 rivers ===
Rank	River	State(s)	Threats
1	Colorado River	AZ	Glen Canyon Dam
2	Alsek and Tatshenshini Rivers	AK	Proposed mine
3	American River	CA	Proposed dam
4	Penobscot River	ME	Proposed dam
5	Susquehanna River	PA	Proposed dam
6	Upper Mississippi River	MN, WI, IL, IA	Oil spills, hazardous cargo transport
7	Columbia and Snake Rivers	ID, WA, OR	Dams
8	Gunnison River	CO	Dam project
9	Passaic River	NJ	Proposed flood-control tunnel
10	New River	NC	Development

=== 1990 rivers ===
Rank	River	State(s)	Threats
1	Klamath River	OR	Proposed hydroelectric project
2	South Platte River	CO	Proposed dam
3	Penobscot River	ME	Proposed dam
4	American River	CA	Proposed dam
5	Bruneau and Jarbidge Rivers	ID	Air Force missile range
6	Alsek and Tatshenshini Rivers	AK	Proposed mine
7	Passaic River	NJ	Proposed flood-control tunnel
8	Cahaba River	AL	Proposed methane project
9	Jemez River	NM	Proposed pumice mine
10	James River	MO	Proposed dam

=== 1989 rivers ===
Rank	River	State(s)	Threats
1	Platte River	CO, NE	Dams
2	Klamath River	OR	Proposed dam
3	American River	CA	Proposed dam
4	Penobscot River	ME	Proposed dam
5	Payette River	ID	Proposed dams
6	James River	VA	Proposed hydroelectric project
7	Little Bighorn River	WY	Hydroelectric project
8	Illinois Bayou	AR	Proposed dam
9	New River	NC	Development
10	Animas River	CO	Irrigation project

=== 1988 rivers ===
Rank	River	State(s)	Threats
1	South Platte River	CO	Proposed dam
2	Klamath River	OR	Proposed dam
3	Little Bighorn River	WY	Proposed dam
4	Greenbrier River	WV	Proposed dam
5	Platte River	NE	Dams
6	Hanford Reach of the Columbia River	WA	Proposed dredging
7	Susquehanna River	PA	Proposed dam
8	American River	CA	Proposed dam
9	Animas River	CO	Proposed irrigation project
10	Black River	NY	Proposed hydroelectric projects

=== 1987 rivers ===
American Rivers announced its ten most endangered rivers of 1987 via press release, with no accompanying report. All ten rivers faced dam proposals. The rivers were not ranked.

River	State(s)	Threats
Kings River	CA	Proposed dam
Merced River	CA	Proposed dam
Merrimack River	NH	Proposed dam
Illinois Bayou	AR	Proposed dam
Verde River	AZ	Proposed dam
Klamath River	OR	Proposed dam
Greenbrier River	WV	Proposed dam
Platte River	CO, NE, WY	Proposed dam
Little Bighorn River	WY	Proposed dam
Black River	NY	Proposed dam

=== 1986 rivers ===
American Rivers announced its ten most endangered rivers of 1986 via press release, with no accompanying report. The rivers were not ranked.

River	State(s)	Threats
Kings River	CA	Proposed hydroelectric project
Merced River	CA	Proposed hydroelectric project
Kern River	CA	Proposed dam
Maurice River	NJ	Proposed toxic waste incinerator site
Menantico Creek	NJ	Proposed toxic waste incinerator site
Manumuskin River	NJ	Proposed toxic waste incinerator site
Niobrara River	NE	Proposed dam
Black River	NY	Proposed hydroelectric project
Rio Chama	NM	Proposed raising of reservoir level
Merrimack River	NH	Dam project at Sewalls Falls
