= Citizens United to Protect the Maurice River and Its Tributaries, Inc. =

U.S. watershed organization

Citizens United to Protect the Maurice River and Its Tributaries, Inc., or "CU", is a 501(c)(3) (nonprofit) regional watershed organization. It was founded in 1979 and incorporated in 1986.

CU received Environmental Quality Awards from the United States Environmental Protection Agency (EPA) in 1994 and again in 2000 for their efforts to procure the federal Wild and Scenic designation for the Maurice, Menantico, Manumuskin Rivers and the Muskee Creek. In the year 2000 CU was also acknowledged by the EPA for the work on an osprey colony, their annual raptor and waterfowl survey, the film “Down Jersey” and accompanying teachers’ guide, and the North American Wetlands Conservation Act.

In 2002 Citizens United to Protect the Maurice River and Its Tributaries, Inc. took first place in the category of Education and Learning Institute, NJ Department of Environmental Protection, Division of Watershed Management for their PBS film “Down Jersey” and the teachers’ curriculum, “Down Jersey: Celebrating Our Sense of Place.” Over 500 teachers have taken workshops in order to teach the curriculum.

CU also co-produced a documentary with New Jersey Network for which they received a Mid-Atlantic Emmy award for Outstanding Arts Program or Special.

== Mission ==
Their mission reads:

Citizens United is dedicated to protecting the watershed of the Maurice River and the region known as Down Jersey, thereby enabling current and future generations to enjoy the environmental, recreational, cultural, and scenic resources of this Wild & Scenic global treasure.

CU empowers individuals, organizations, and neighboring communities to promote the region’s enduring well-being and quality of life. CU invites participation and fosters responsible stewardship. CU supports education, awareness, and informed decision-making utilizing field work, research, and advocacy.

== Work ==
CU's work in the Maurice River watershed typically begins geographically at Willow Grove Lake and continues south; the South Jersey Land and Water Trust begins its work in the vicinity of Willow Grove Lake and extends northward to the headwaters of Scotland Run.

The Maurice River watershed has a drainage of 386 square miles (1,000 km^{2}) and runs south through Cumberland County, New Jersey to the Delaware Bay. The major tributaries of the Maurice River include Scotland Run, Menantico Creek, Muskee Creek, Muddy Run, and the Manumuskin River.

On December 1, 1993, President Bill Clinton signed a congressional act designating 10.3 miles (16.6 km) of the Maurice River, 7.9 miles (12.7 km) of the Menantico Creek, 14.3 miles (23.0 km) of the Manumuskin River, and 2.7 miles (4.3 km) of the Muskee Creek as Wild and Scenic.

The Delaware Bay estuary is a Ramsar Wetlands of International Importance listed site. It has also been named by The Nature Conservancy as one of the "Last Great Places on Earth".

=== Ecological significance ===
The Maurice River watershed includes a variety of habitat supporting rare wildlife and plant populations. Its vast wetland and forest complexes host wintering waterfowl and spring migratory shorebirds. A 1992 report by the National Wild and Scenic River Study states that “[t]he study area functions as critical migration-related habitat for shorebirds, songbirds, waterfowl, raptors, rails and fish. The Maurice River and its tributaries drain the Southwest portion of the Pinelands National Reserve, which is also an International Biosphere Reserve under the United Nations Man and Biosphere Program.”

The New Jersey Landscape mapping indicates the Maurice River watershed as habitat for bald eagles, waterfowl, and several other migratory birds. In addition, the area contains the world's largest population of Aeschynomene virginica, (sensitive joint vetch). Its NatureServ Conservation Status is G2, globally imperiled. The watershed also contains the state's largest expanse of wild rice marsh, within the Glades Refuge, and an old growth swamp forest, Bear Swamp, a NJ state listed Natural Heritage Priority Site.

=== Cultural history ===
The Native Americans called the Maurice River “Wahatquenack”. The river's current name is thought to be derived from the Prince Maurice, a 17th-century Dutch ship reputed to have sunk in its waters.

The river's maritime history is intertwined with the oyster harvest, commercial fishing, and shipbuilding. The AJ Meerwald, a 1928 oyster schooner that operated on the Maurice and in the Delaware Bay, dubbed “NJ’s Tall Ship” by former Governor Christie Whitman, has been restored by the Bayshore Discovery Project for educational purposes.

=== Economic importance and recreational opportunities ===
The Maurice River supports such industries as commercial crabbing, eeling, net fishing, and oystering. Boating, kayaking, canoeing, birding, hiking, fishing, hunting and railbirding are several of the recreational activities pursued on the river. President Benjamin Harrison hunted on the Maurice River during his presidential term.

== Approach ==
- Education
- Fieldwork
- Research
- Advocacy

=== Education ===
CU created a curriculum called “Down Jersey” which won the 2000 EPA Regional Education Award, and the 2001 NJDEP Statewide Watershed Award for Education. CU also partnered with New Jersey Network Public Television in 1997 to create a documentary by the same name in conjunction with this curriculum. Additionally, CU and NJN partnered on two other documentaries: “Bayshore Artists: Celebrating Our Sense of Place,” in 2001, and “Glenn Rudderow: Reflections of a Bayshore Painter,” in 2005, the second of which was awarded a Mid-Atlantic Emmy award for Outstanding Arts Program or Special. The documentary aired nationally in 2006.

CU has also created various educational slideshows such as “Eggs to Flight” which follows the maturation of osprey from hatching to fledging, and “Fish and Chicks” which traces the decline and subsequent restoration efforts involving the osprey on the Maurice River.

Additionally, CU has created a botanical site that focuses on the flora of southern New Jersey and the Pine Barrens of New Jersey.

CU has documented the local history of a number of reaches on the Maurice River as well as securing source material on the Burcham Farm, the last remaining diked farm in southern New Jersey.

Other aspects of CU's educational approach include:

- Participation in various community festivals such as the Cumberland County Winter Eagle Festival and Bay Days;
- “Raptor Discovery Days,” which involve programming for approximately 600 school children preceding the Eagle Festival; and
- Various activities and events for the public including bimonthly meetings with speakers, presentations for local groups, and opportunities such as birding, kayaking, and hiking.

The group also provides a scholarship for art students. The Connie Jost Scholarship was created in 1998 in memory of the late Connie Jost, a local artist, painter, sculptor, and educator who frequently incorporated fish and marine animals into her works.

=== Fieldwork ===
CU's fieldwork includes an osprey colony project, purple martin banding, wood ducks, Adopt-a-Swamp pink population, eagle nest monitoring, and international shorebird team assistance.

Osprey colony project: The osprey (Pandion haliaetus) ) is a bird of prey (raptor) which feeds almost exclusively on fish. Seen in the coastal estuaries of many countries, the osprey is present on every continent with the exception of Antarctica. Its head is white with a black eye stripe. Its wing span is four and half to six feet and it is highly streamlined, making it an extremely maneuverable flier. Its talons are extremely sharp, which helps in piercing through the scales of a fish. Osprey generally mate for life but they will choose a new partner if a mate perishes. They normally lay three eggs; four is rare. On average they raise 2.5 young each season. Under the management of the New Jersey State Division of Fish and Wildlife, the NJ Endangered and Nongame Species Program monitors osprey populations statewide. Historically there were 500 nesting pair of osprey in NJ. In the 1950s and 1960s the use of DDT reduced their numbers to 50 pair. They were not productive, so chicks were brought in from nests in regions that had not been exposed to these chemical contaminants and the young were fostered by NJ's remaining birds. The fledglings imprinted to the area and returned as adults to build their own nests along New Jersey's rivers and bays.

Citizens statewide volunteered to help restore populations by providing nesting platforms for this threatened species. In the mid-1980s Citizens United to Protect the Maurice River and Its Tributaries, Inc. (Citizens United or CU) began an osprey colony. In 2007 the State passed the milestone of 400 nesting pair. Citizens United's volunteers monitor approximately 50 nesting platforms and they have constructed and erected more than 50 platforms for other organizations and corporations, including the NJ Endangered and Nongame Species Program, NJ Department of Protection Bureau of Emergency Response, Community Energy, PSE&G and The Natural Lands Trust.

CU volunteers maintain the 50+ platforms along the Maurice River. Each June and July they band the offspring in these structures. Between 1985 and 2007 more than 150 people participated in this project. When the program was begun in 1985, an average of three chicks fledged each year. Since 2006, nesting pairs have produced in excess of 60 chicks. The platform design developed by Citizens United has become the official design of the State of New Jersey. The platform plans and materials list, available online, have been utilized by people from a number of different geographical regions.

Purple martin banding: Purple martins (Progne subis) are the largest of the North American swallows and, in the eastern U.S., are entirely dependent upon man for their housing. In conjunction with CU, members and other individuals band the birds for research purposes. In 2008, CU member Allen Jackson and those working with him banded over 8000 purple martins, an increase of 2000 birds from the prior year. CU also donates funds to purchase the bands.

Wood ducks: CU has put up a number of wood duck boxes on both the Manumuskin and the Maurice, and has also taught various groups of local high school students to build them, as well as making the plans for the boxes available online.

Adopt a swamp pink population: Swamp pink (Helonias bullata) is a federally threatened member of the lily family. Seventy percent of its global population occurs in New Jersey. CU has partnered with the United States Fish and Wildlife Service on a monitoring project, “Adopt-a-Swamp-Pink Population”. The survey results are shared with U.S.F.W.S. and NJ Natural Heritage.

Assisting NJ Division of Fish and Wildlife, Endangered and Nongame Species Program: CU assists in two facets: a number of volunteers monitor eagles’ nests for the State; and their members also provide support to the international Shorebird Team that visits May–June of each year to study the migratory shorebird phenomenon. CU members help with the banding of shorebirds, as well as hosting the scientists during their stay by providing them with meals and local cultural activities.

World Series of Birding: CU's team, the “Fish Hawks”, was formed in 2007 and placed second in the category of limited geographical region that year. A portion of the monies raised by the team defray the expenses of hosting the international shorebird scientists.

=== Advocacy ===
Citizens United to Protect the Maurice River and Its Tributaries, Inc. has been involved in environmental advocacy since its inception, and has made presentations and given testimony at local, state, and national levels for local land protection efforts.

Some of those include:

- Giving testimony on behalf of the Maurice River Project Area, a cooperative endeavor under the North American Wetlands Conservation Act.
- Initiating a number of nominations that were submitted to the National Park Service and Congress requesting the dedication of the Maurice River and three of its tributaries: the Manantico, Manumuskin, and Muskee River as Wild and Scenic River by the US Congress
- Serving on the Wild and Scenic Task Force that developed the summary of the resource values and the ultimate management plan for the rivers
- Challenging the placement of structures within the wild and scenic corridor and making suggestions to cell tower companies on locating towers
- Assisting local governments with the design of various city ordinances for tree harvesting, land mining, and communication towers
- Proposing alternatives to the development of environmentally sensitive sites
- Assisting corporations to help them meet project mitigation standards
- Opposing pollution of sites that were later deemed US EPA Superfund Sites

== Partnerships ==
Since its inception, CU has partnered with other conservation organizations. Partners have included National Park Service, Natural Lands Trust, The Nature Conservancy, New Jersey Network, New Jersey Audubon Society, NJ Conservation Foundation, Bayshore Discovery Project, NJ Division of Fish and Wildlife, Rutgers Environmental Law Clinic, Columbia Environmental Law Clinic, and U.S. Fish and Wildlife Service. CU also works with corporations on their habitat projects: Community Energy, PSE&G Estuary Enhancement Project, Morie Sand and Gravel and others.

CU is also a member of the South Jersey Bayshore Coalition.
