= Parvin State Park =

State park in Salem County, New Jersey

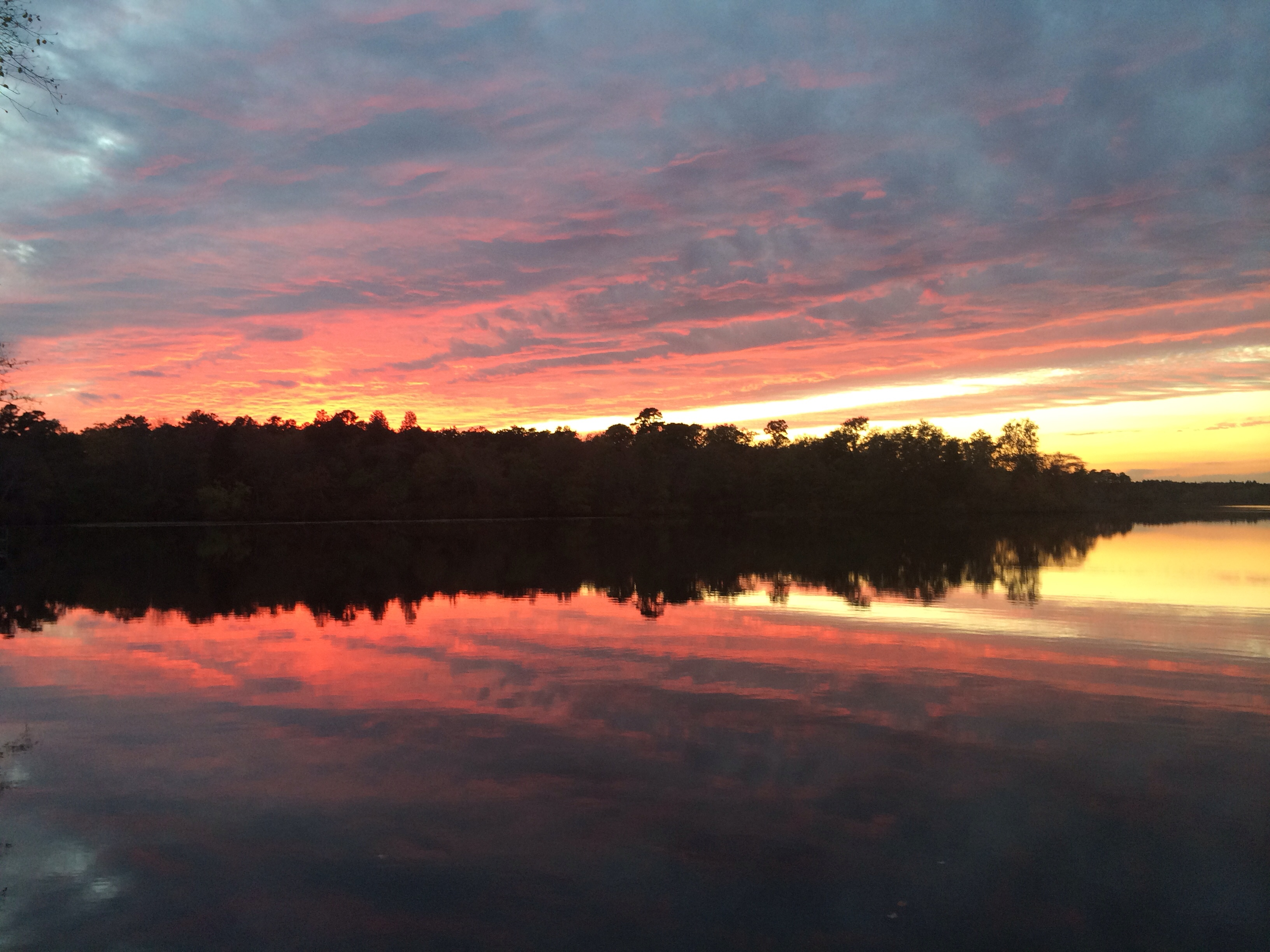
- October sunset over the lake

- Location within New Jersey Location within the United States
- Location: Pittsgrove Township
- Coordinates: 39°30′39″N 75°07′58″W
- Area: 465-acre (1.88 km^{2})
- Opened: 1931
- Operator: New Jersey Division of Parks and Forestry
- Website: Official website

Parvin State Park is a state park located in the southwestern part of New Jersey. Situated around Parvin Lake on the edge of the Pine Barrens, the park includes pine forests, hardwood forests, and swamps. The park is located near Pittsgrove Township in Salem County, and is operated and maintained by the New Jersey Division of Parks and Forestry.

== Geography ==
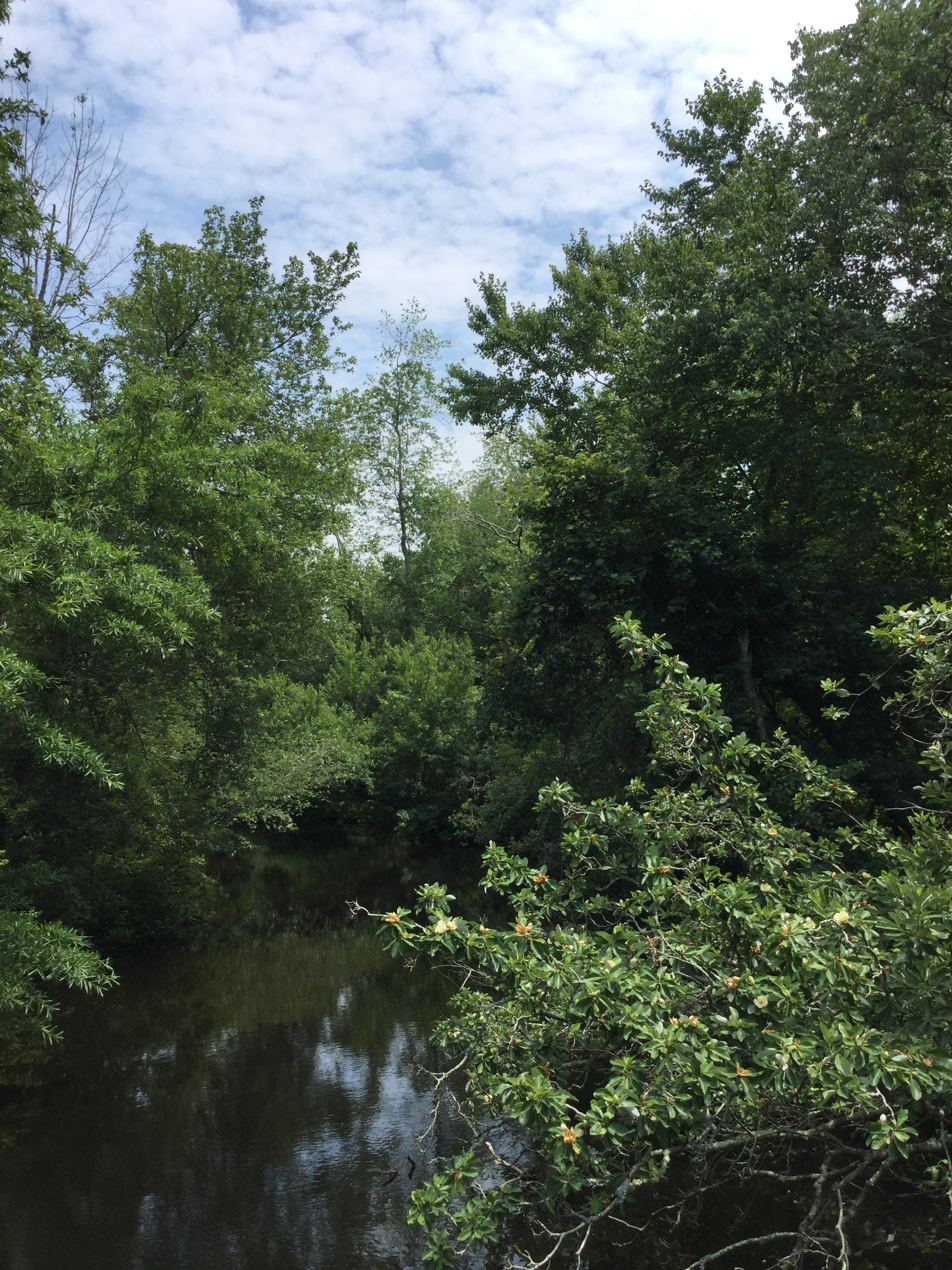
Muddy Run flowing through Parvin State Park

Parvin State Park is in Pittsgrove Township, Salem County, New Jersey, 5 miles west of Vineland, in an agricultural area. The largest lake in the park is Parvin Lake, which occupies much of the eastern corner of the park and into which flows a stream, the Muddy Run; there is a smaller lake, Thundergust Lake, to the south of Parvin Lake.

About 465 acres (1.88 km^{2}) of the park are designated as the Parvin Natural Area.

== Ecology ==
Parvin State Park is in an area of transition between the Pine Barrens and hardwood forest and includes a variety of terrain; its ecology is therefore unusually diverse, including areas of hardwood and white cedar swamp, lowland pine forest, and upland pine and oak forest. The park's at least 50 species of trees include white cedar, pitch pine, red maple, several species of oak, black cherry, and winterberry holly. Common types of bushes in the park include greenbrier, wild azaleas, mountain laurel, and sweet pepperbush. The endangered swamp pink grows in the park.

The park has at least 180 species of birds. The wild turkey, barred owl, yellow-billed cuckoo, and many species of warblers live in the park's forests. The lakes and Muddy Run are habitats of the prothonotary warbler, the great blue and green heron, the great egret, and more than a dozen species of ducks; black-crowned night herons, pied-billed grebes, and ospreys are also seen on the lakes occasionally.

== History ==
There are remains of Lenape encampments near the park. The first recorded European settlement in the area was in 1742. In 1796, Lemuel Parvin settled in what is now the park and dammed the Muddy Run stream to power a sawmill, thus creating Parvin Lake.

In 1930, the state of New Jersey bought 918 acres of land in what is now the park, and from 1933 to 1941 the Civilian Conservation Corps developed the park. The park was used in 1943 as a summer camp for the children of interned Japanese Americans, in 1944 as a prisoner of war camp for German soldiers from the Afrika Korps, and in 1952 as temporary housing for Kalmyk Americans who fled their homelands in the USSR.

== Camping ==
- Campsites: 56 tent and trailer sites with fire rings, picnic tables, lantern hooks and a playground available. Six people and two vehicles per site. Flush toilets, showers, and laundry facilities are within walking distance. Facilities available for people with disabilities. Trailer sanitary station. Located on the south shore of Parvin Lake. Open year-round. $20 per night for NJ residents and $25 per night for out of state residents.
- Group campsites: Four group sites; 25 people per site; total capacity: 100. Flush toilets, water, fire rings, picnic tables, one shelter. Located on south shore of Parvin Lake. Open April 1 through October 31. $50 per night for NJ residents and $100 per night for out of state residents
- Cabins: 16 cabins each with furnished living room with fireplace or wood burning stove; two rooms with either two or three bunks in each; kitchen with running water, electric stove, refrigerator; bathroom with sink, toilet, and shower; electricity; brick patio with table and grill. Each accommodates 4 people. Two additional 6-bunk cabin are accessible for people with disabilities. Playground available. Cabins are on the north shore of Thundergust Lake. Open April 1 through October 31.

Four-bunk cabins: $55 per night for NJ residents and $65 per night for out of state residents. Six-bunk cabins: $75 per night for NJ residents and $85 per night for out of state residents.

== Swimming ==
A lifeguard staffed swimming beach is provided at Parvin Grove, which is located on Parvin Lake. Swimming is available from Memorial Day to Labor Day.

== Picnicking ==
There are several picnic areas with grills and tables. For large groups, a reservation fee is applied.
