= Still Run =

Still Run may refer to:

- Still Run (Maurice River tributary), New Jersey, United States
- Still Run (album), an album by Wet
