= Manumuskin =

Manumuskin may refer to the following places in the U.S. state of New Jersey:

- Manumuskin, New Jersey, an unincorporated community in Cumberland County
- Manumuskin River, in Cumberland County
