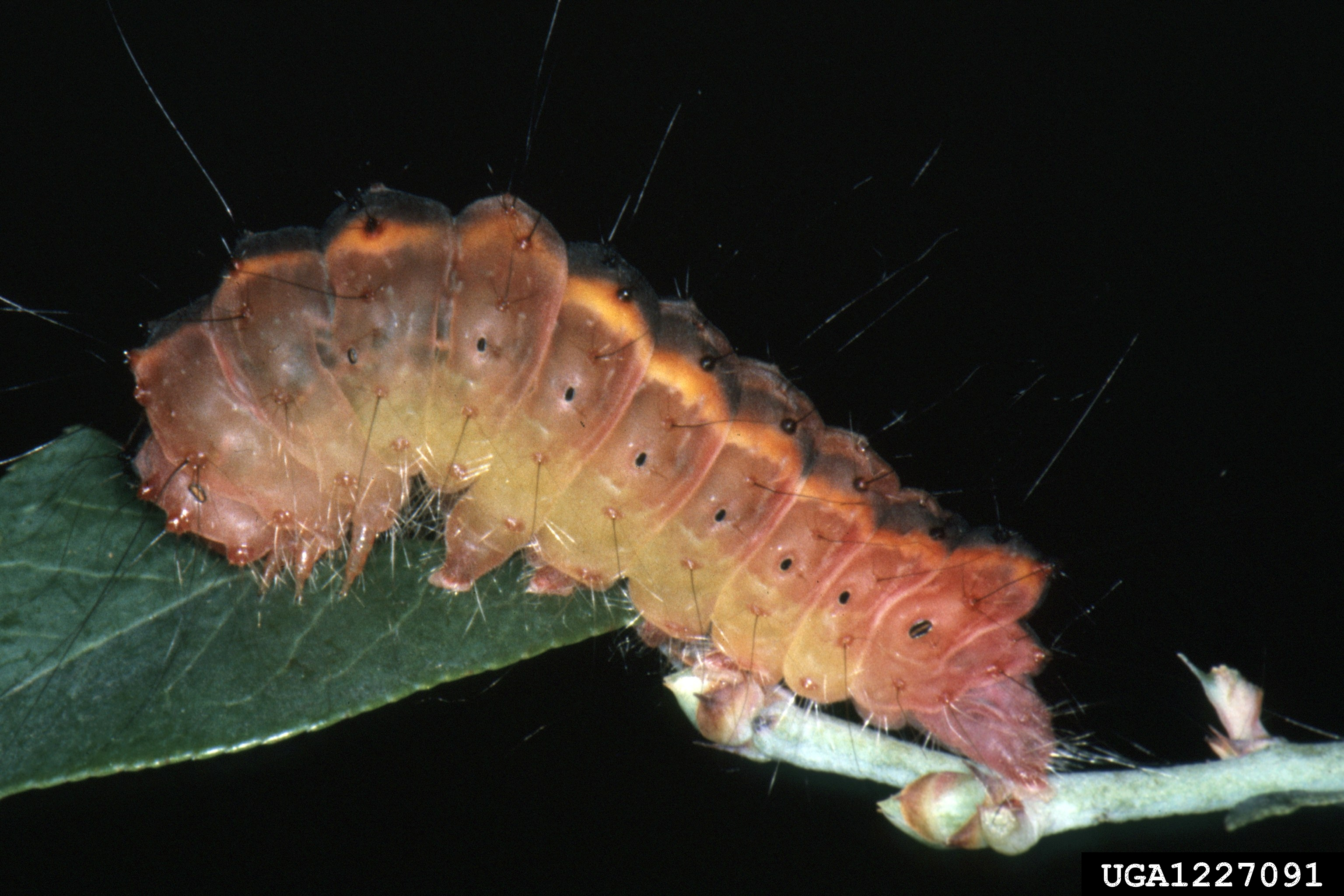

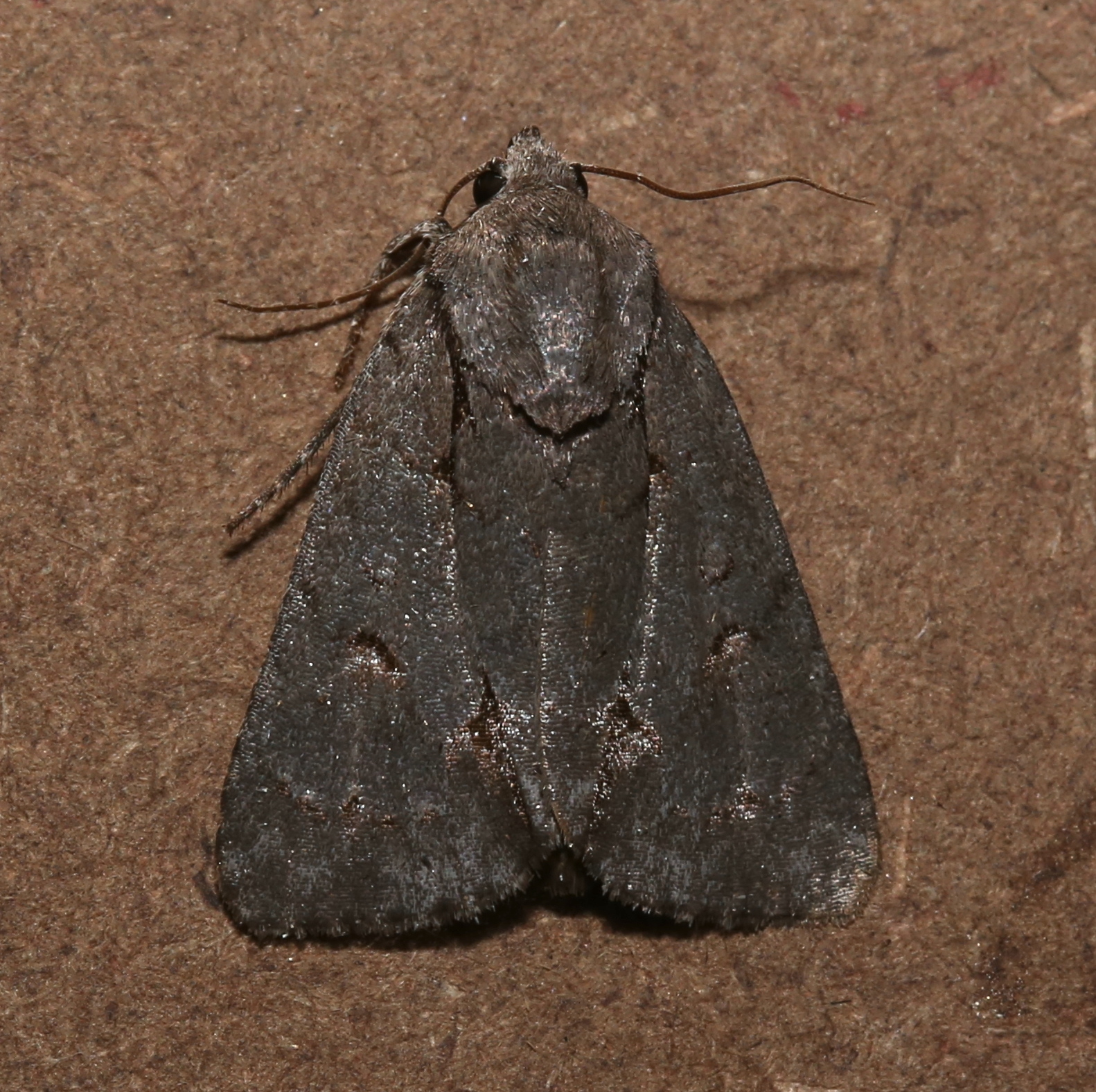

Scientific classification
- Kingdom: Animalia
- Phylum: Arthropoda
- Class: Insecta
- Order: Lepidoptera
- Superfamily: Noctuoidea
- Family: Noctuidae
- Genus: Acronicta
- Species: A. tritona

Binomial name
- Acronicta tritona (Hübner, 1818)

= Acronicta tritona =

Species of moth

Acronicta tritona, the Triton dagger moth, is a moth of the family Noctuidae. The species was first described by Jacob Hübner in 1818. It is found in eastern North America, from Nova Scotia west to north-eastern Alberta, south to Florida and Texas, and west to Oregon.

The wingspan is 35–40 mm.

The larva feeds on Helonias bullata and Vaccinium species, including Oxycoccos species and Vaccinium stamineum.
