= Pinto Creek =

Pinto Creek may refer to:

- Pinto Creek (Arizona), a tributary of the Salt River in Gila County, Arizona
- Pinto Creek (Texas), a tributary to the Rio Grande in Kinney County, Texas
- Rural Municipality of Pinto Creek No. 75, a municipality in Saskatchewan, Canada
