= Scotland Run (disambiguation) =

Scotland Run is a tributary of the Maurice River, Gloucester County, New Jersey, US.

Scotland Run may also refer to:

- Scotland Run (race), a 10K run held annually in New York City, US, as part of Taran Week events
- Scotland Run Golf Club, a golf course and country club in Williamstown, New Jersey, US
