= Helonias alpina =

Scientific classification
- Kingdom: Plantae
- Clade: Embryophytes
- Clade: Tracheophytes
- Clade: Angiosperms
- Clade: Monocots
- Order: Liliales
- Family: Melanthiaceae
- Genus: Helonias
- Species: H. alpina

Binomial name
- Helonias alpina (F.T.Wang & Tang) N.Tanaka

Synonyms
- Ypsilandra alpina F.T.Wang & Tang

Species of flowering plant

Helonias alpina is a plant native to southeastern Tibet to northern Myanmar.
