= Endangered river =

River that is likely to partly or fully dry up

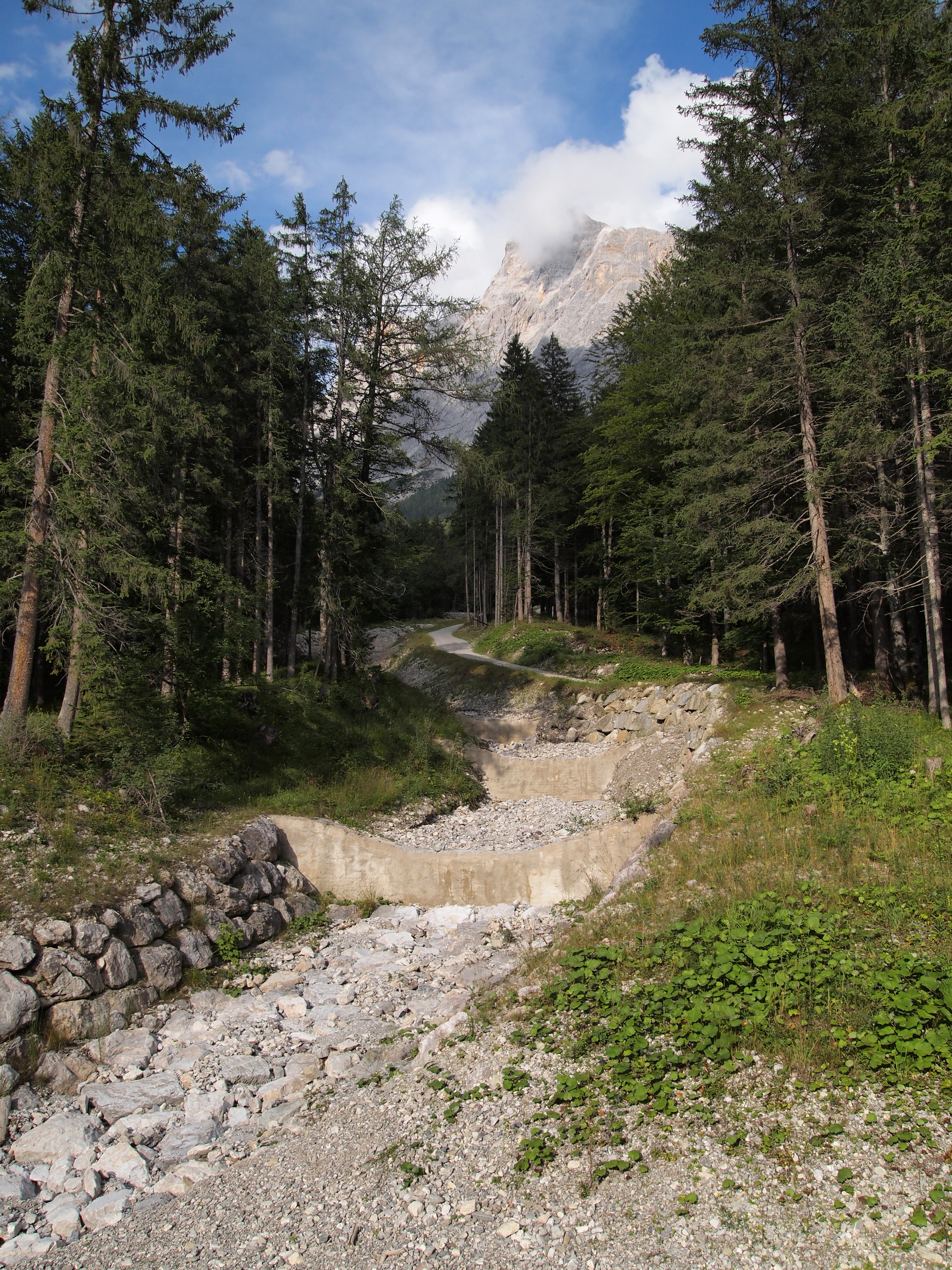
A dried-up river in Ehrwald

An endangered river is one which has the potential to partly or fully dry up, or one that is thought to have ecological issues now or in the near future. Some such issues are natural while others are the direct result of human development. Organisations including the World Wildlife Fund (WWF) have published lists of rivers at risk. The WWF's 2007 list featured the Danube, the Nile, and the Rio Grande amongst others, stating that these "once great rivers" are in danger and "can no longer be assured of reaching the sea unhindered". The US National Park Service reported in 2015 that part of the Rio Grande "often lies dry". Dangers may be the result of the natural change of conditions in the local environment but many are due to human development projects such as dams and irrigation. Humans have also caused significant water pollution which endangers life which relies upon the water source.

== Importance ==
According to the World Resources Institute (WRI) river basins are "indispensable resources for billions of people, companies, farms, and ecosystems" but many suffer from "water stress". It states that numerous major rivers around the world have become depleted to the point that they can fail to reach their destinations. Water scarcity is a danger to all the life that depends on the source.

== Dangers to rivers ==
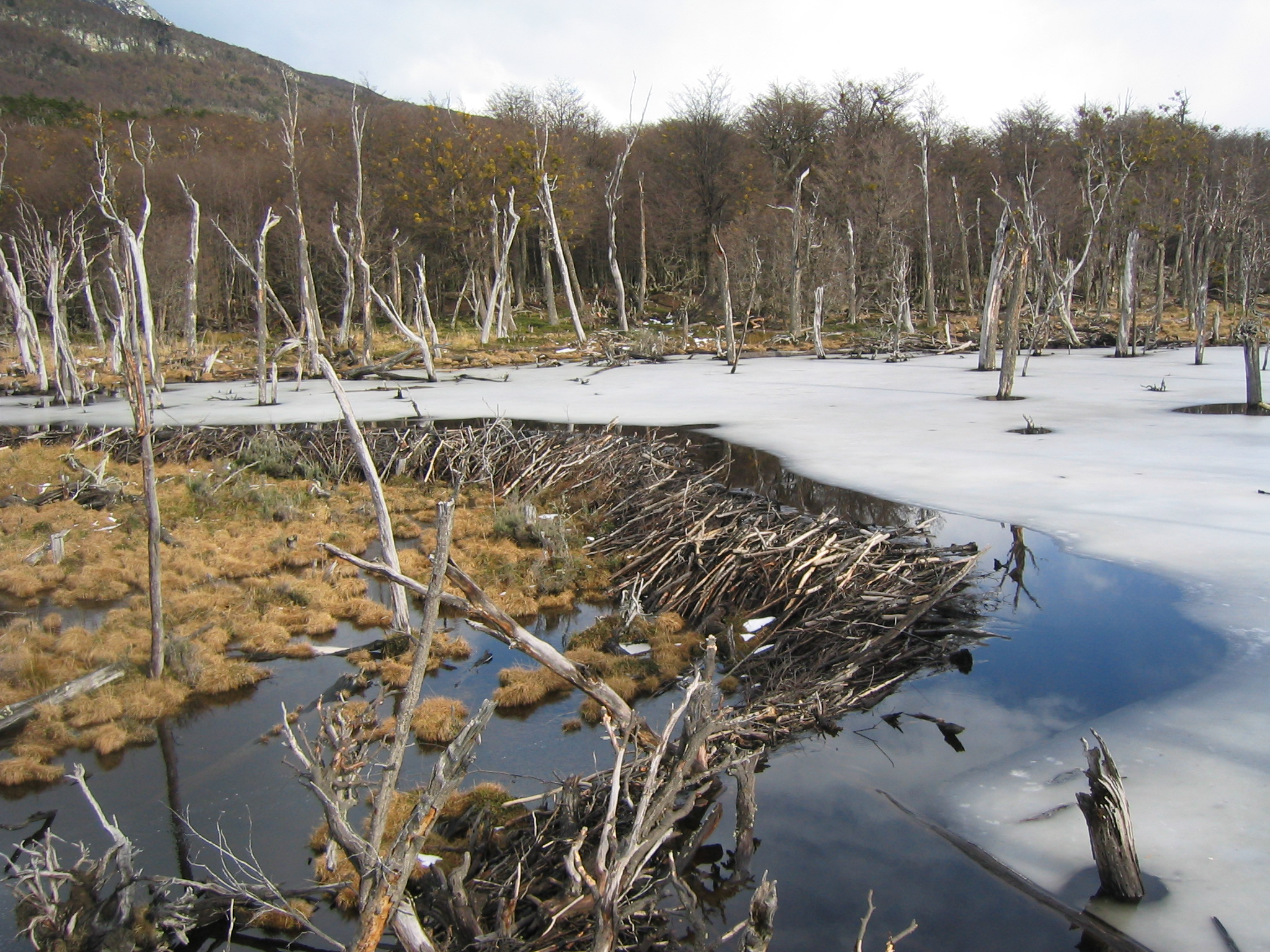
Beavers from North America constitute an invasive species in Tierra del Fuego.

Rivers face many dangers, both natural and manmade. Climate change can have a significant impact on rivers, both positive and negative. This could be seen as an indirect result of human developments. An area which has a reduction in rainfall or an increase in temperature can make a river fully or partially dry out. This often means that the water can no longer reach its mouth.

The flora and fauna of an area can face change and can have a substantial impact on landscape and local ecology. Invasive species can move into an area or be introduced by humans. One particular example of the latter is the case of beavers being introduced into Tierra del Fuego in 1946. While only 20 animals were transplanted into the area they quickly reproduced with no natural predator to curb numbers. Their effect on the area, through the damaging gnawing of trees and the building of their dams, has been significant enough that humans continue an attempt to undo their mistake with a program of beaver eradication. The ponds created by the beavers, which now number in the tens of thousands, have greatly contributed to the amount of organic matter retained by the rivers which then causes more problems downstream.

=== Specific human factors ===
Human interference in the form of river engineering can redirect the flow of the water using dams or channelisation. The increasing demand from irrigated agriculture, continued industrialisation, and residential use heavily impacts upon the health of river systems. This means that many areas face high levels of "baseline water stress". Rivers can be cut off from their floodplains and their normal route can be changed or disrupted significantly. If improperly managed this can have a devastating effect on the surrounding area and endanger the plants and animals that depend on them, including humans. Water pollution is another artificial danger which can be a serious threat to wildlife and human health. The Colorado River runs from the Rocky Mountain National Park in Colorado through four other states, parts of Mexico, and then on to the Gulf of California. Due to the human demands for water very little reaches Mexico and what does is often polluted. The Teesta River faces similar issues. The river flows through India and into Bangladesh, but India's water demands led to the part of the river in Bangladesh to dry up in 2018. If the situation continues it could be catastrophic for the local ecosystem.

The Rio Grande Project was an irrigation, hydroelectricity, flood control, and interbasin water transfer project serving the upper Rio Grande basin in the southwestern United States. It was completed in 1952 and has had a significant impact on the surrounding area. In the past, the river was wide, deep and fast-flowing in its section through Texas, where it forms a large part of the Mexico – United States border. Illegal immigrants once had to swim across the river at the border, but with the river so low immigrants need only wade across for most of the year. After leaving El Paso the Rio Grande often runs dry because so much water has been diverted away for human use. Other than extensive diversions, exotic introduced, fast-growing and water-consuming plants, such as water hyacinth and hydrilla, are also leading to reduced flows. The United States government has recently attempted to slow or stop the progress of these weeds by introducing insects and fish that feed on the invasive plants.

== Reports ==
In 2014 a Channel 4 report suggested that the Indonesian Citarum River, forty miles east of Jakarta, may be the most polluted river in the world. Running from Mount Wayang to the Java Sea, there are over 30 million residents who rely on the river. Rapid industrialisation has had such a harmful effect that the river's surface cannot be seen for the waste and detritus floating on top of it.

=== World Wildlife Fund report ===
The WWF published on their website the "10 Rivers most at Risk", a report from March 2007. They based their criteria on major rivers which already suffer or are particularly likely in the future to suffer from six key threats: dams and infrastructure, excessive water extraction, climate change, invasive species, over-fishing, and pollution. They noted that some of the greatest rivers "can no longer be assured of reaching the sea unhindered". The ten rivers which most concerned them are:

- Salween River
- La Plata
- Danube
- Rio Grande
- Ganges
- Murray–Darling basin
- Indus River
- Nile
- Yangtze
- Mekong

=== American Rivers reports ===
Each year American Rivers publishes a list containing ten of "America's Most Endangered Rivers". In 2018 its criteria focused on "threats [to rivers] from the Trump administration" and it selected the Big Sunflower River as the one most endangered using their criteria. The river is one of the main tributaries of the Yazoo River in the U.S. state of Mississippi but is threatened by the Yazoo Backwater Area Pumping Plant project which they say has the potential to damage 200,000 acres of important wetland.

=== World Resources Institute project ===
The World Resources Institute's Aqueduct project evaluated, mapped, and rated the state of the water supplies for 100 river basins in areas of high population. Their list highlighted the dangers to the Qom River, Yongding River, Brantas River, and Heray Rud River amongst others.
