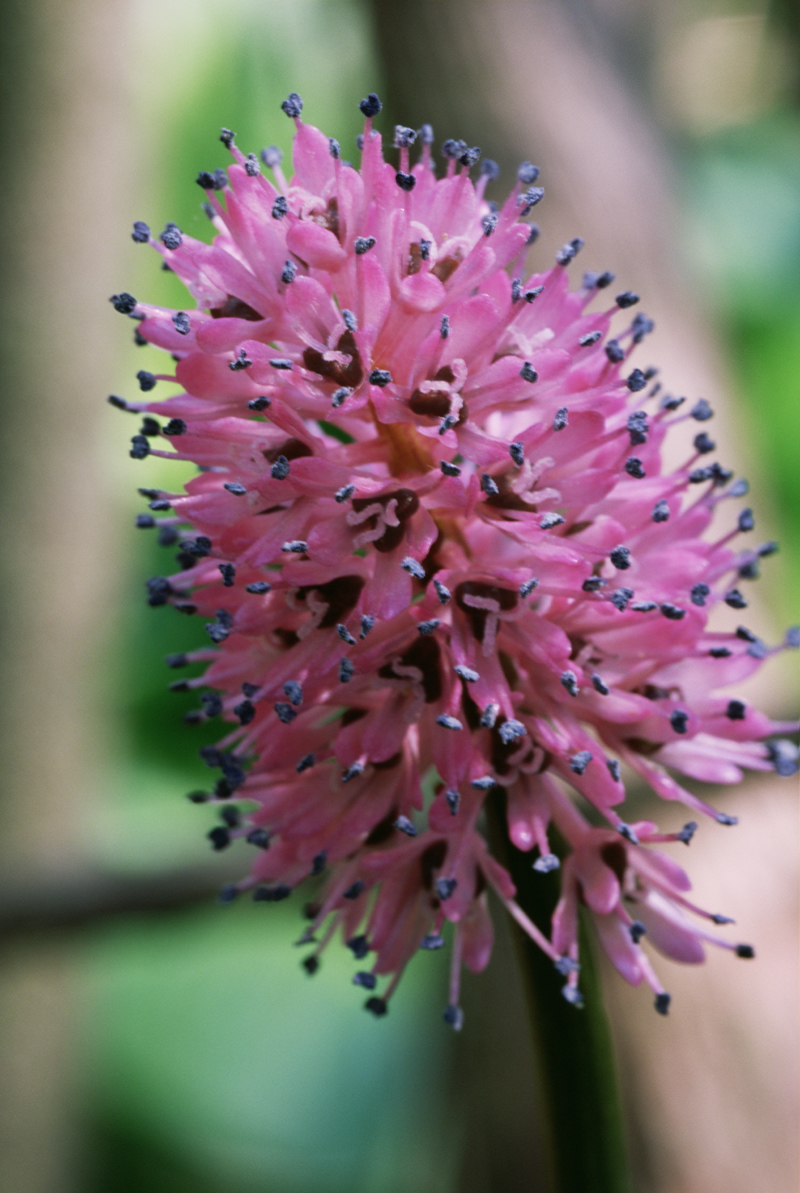
- Helonias bullata

Scientific classification
- Kingdom: Plantae
- Clade: Tracheophytes
- Clade: Angiosperms
- Clade: Monocots
- Order: Liliales
- Family: Melanthiaceae
- Tribe: Heloniadeae
- Genus: Helonias; L.

Synonyms
- Kozola Raf.; Heloniopsis A.Gray; Hexonix Raf.; Sugerokia Miq.; Ypsilandra Franch.

= Helonias =

Genus of flowering plants

Helonias is a genus of flowering plants. It contains 12 species, with 11 native to the Himalayas and eastern Asia and one (H. bullata) to the eastern United States.

Some authors treat Helonias as a monotypic genus containing only H. bullata, and place the Asian species in the separate genera Ypsilandra and Heloniopsis. Noriyuka Tanaka concluded that the 12 species were broadly similar in morphological and ecological characteristics and should be placed in a single genus. Tanaka divides the genus into two sections; sect. Helonias, consisting only of H. bullata, and sect. Heloniopsis which includes the 11 Asian species. Sect. Helionopsis is composed of two subsections; subsect. Ypsilandra includes of five species previously published under the genus Ypsilandra, and subsect. Heloniopsis includes six species in two series, ser. Umbellatae with three species from Taiwan and the Ryukyu Islands, and ser. Heloniopsis, with three species from Japan, Korea, and southern Sakhalin.

Helonias thibetica is used in traditional Chinese medicine, especially in Sichuan and Yunnan provinces, as a haemostatic.

== Species ==
12 species are accepted.

- Helonias alpina (F.T.Wang & Tang) N.Tanaka – southeastern Tibet and northern Myanmar
- Helonias breviscapa (Maxim.) N.Tanaka – south-central and southern Japan
- Helonias bullata L. – eastern United States
- Helonias jinpingensis (W.H.Chen, Y.M.Shui & Zhi Y.Yu) N.Tanaka – south-central China (southeastern Yunnan) and northern Vietnam
- Helonias kawanoi (Koidz.) N.Tanaka – Ryukyu Islands
- Helonias koreana (Fuse, N.S.Lee & M.N.Tamura) N.Tanaka – Korea
- Helonias leucantha (Koidz.) N.Tanaka – Ryukyu Islands
- Helonias orientalis (Thunb.) N.Tanaka – Korea, Japan, and southern Sakhalin
- Helonias parviflora (F.T.Wang & Tang) N.Tanaka – south-central China (Guizhou)
- Helonias thibetica (Franch.) N.Tanaka – central and southern China
- Helonias umbellata (Baker) N.Tanaka – Taiwan
- Helonias yunnanensis (W.W.Sm. & Jeffrey) N.Tanaka – central and eastern Himalayas, northern Myanmar, and south-central China (Yunnan)
