= Turkey Creek (Mississippi) =

Stream in Copiah County, Mississippi, U.S.

Coordinates: 31.94007°N 90.52772°W

Turkey Creek is a stream in Copiah County, Mississippi.

== See also ==
- List of rivers of Mississippi
