= Smith River (Montana) =

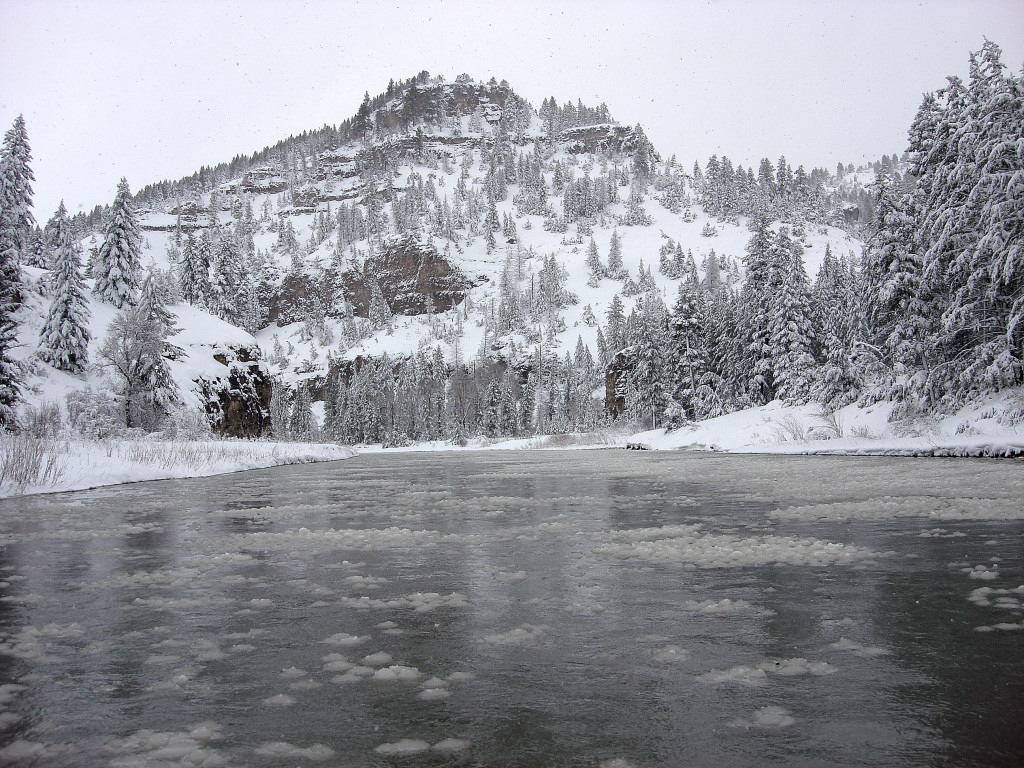

Location
- Country: Cascade and Meagher County, Montana

Physical characteristics
- Source
  - coordinates: 46°31′44″N 110°58′40″W
- Mouth
  - coordinates: 47°24′49″N 111°28′43″W
  - elevation: 3,330 feet (1,010 m)
- Discharge
  - location: Truly
  - average: 228 cu/ft. per sec.

Basin features
- River system: Missouri River

Smith River is a tributary of the Missouri River, in central Montana, in the United States. It rises in southern Meagher County in the Castle Mountains and flows northwest in the valley between the Big Belt and Little Belt mountains, past White Sulphur Springs and past Smith River State Park. It turns north-northwest (NNW), and is joined by Hound Creek in Cascade County, and joins the Missouri approximately 9 miles (14 km) southwest of Great Falls.

The Smith is a Class I river from the Camp Baker Fishing Access site near Ft. Logan to its confluence with the Missouri River for public access for recreational purposes.

Noted for its scenery and trout fishery, the Smith River has only one public put-in and one public take-out along its entire 59-mile (95 km) segment. There are boat camps located along the remote river canyon. The Smith River between Camp Baker and Eden Bridge is the only river corridor managed by Montana Fish, Wildlife & Parks as a permitted river. Permits for private floats on the Smith River are allocated to the public via a lottery system prior to the spring season. Permit applications are typically available the first week of January each year, with an application deadline of mid-February.

Areas near the Smith River are currently under review as nearby Meagher County and state agencies investigate construction of the Black Butte Copper Project.

== See also ==
- List of rivers of Montana
- Montana Stream Access Law
