= Pinto Creek (Arizona) =

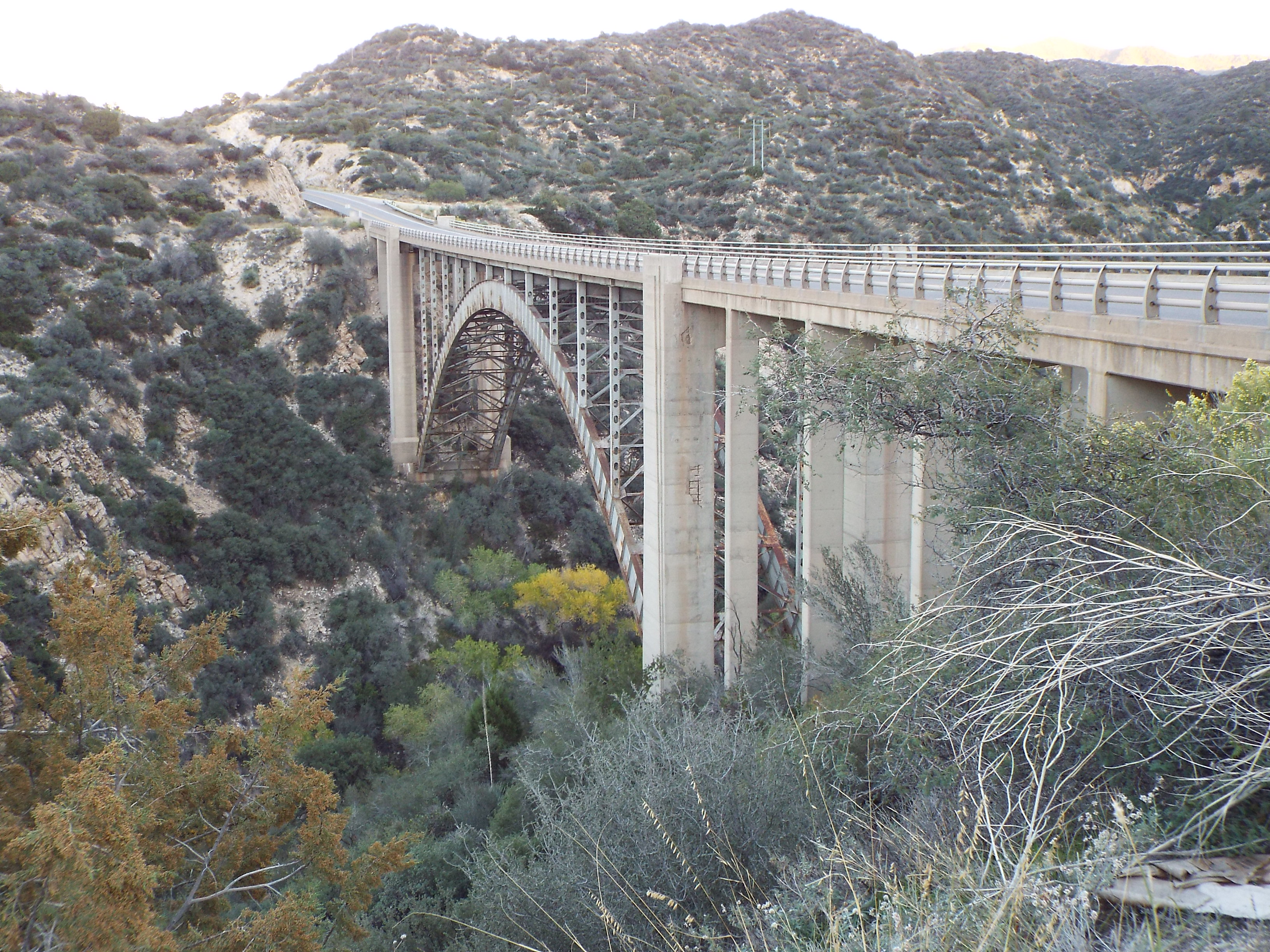
- The US 60 bridge over Pinto Creek in 2018.

Location
- Country: United States
- State: Arizona
- County: Gila County

Physical characteristics
- Mouth: Theodore Roosevelt Lake, Salt River
  - coordinates: 33°38′20″N 110°59′57″W
- Length: 28 mi (45 km)

Basin features
- River system: Colorado River
- Landmarks: Pinto Valley Mine, Carlota Mine

Pinto Creek is a tributary of the Salt River in Gila County, Arizona, within the Tonto National Forest. The creek winds for 28 miles (45 km) northward from the Pinal Mountains, through the Sonoran Desert, before emptying into the tail of Theodore Roosevelt Lake. Since the 1980s, the Pinto Creek watershed has been the site of environmental disputes over water rights and mining operations.

Historically, the lower Pinto Creek was a rare desert riparian stream that supported sycamore, cottonwood, willow, and ash trees, and a diversity of wildlife. The creek started drying up in 2013 as a result of increased groundwater pumping by the Pinto Valley Mine, despite the Forest Service holding instream flow rights. As of 2022, mining continues while much of Pinto Creek remains dry year-round. Groundwater repletion is expected to take at least 100 years.

== Mining ==
=== Pinto Valley Mine ===
In 1999 the Forest Service obtained an instream flow right to Pinto Creek, granting it the ability to require a minimum water flow from mining companies.

=== Carlota Mine ===
The Carlota Mine is an open pit copper mine located abreast of Pinto Creek about 15 miles (24 km) upstream from its outlet, encompassing both private and Forest Service lands.

The mine's copper deposit was discovered in the mid-1990s. The environmental impact statement for the mine was completed on June 22, 1997, while the plan of operation was completed in 1998. The mine began production on December 18, 2008, under the ownership of Vancouver-based Quadra Mining Ltd. In 2010, Quadra Mining merged with FNX Mining Company Inc. to form Quadra FNX Mining. In 2012, KGHM Polska Miedź acquired the Carlota Mine through its acquisition of Quadra FNX. In 2021, KGHM had plans to divest from the Carlota Mine.

In response to the original proposal for the Carlota Mine, American Rivers designated Pinto Creek as one of America's Most Endangered Rivers in 1996, 1997, and 1998. While the Carlota Mine extracted water from the Pinto Creek watershed, the Forest Service required the operation of devices to feed water back into the creek. These kept portions of the target area watered year-round.
