= Maurice River =

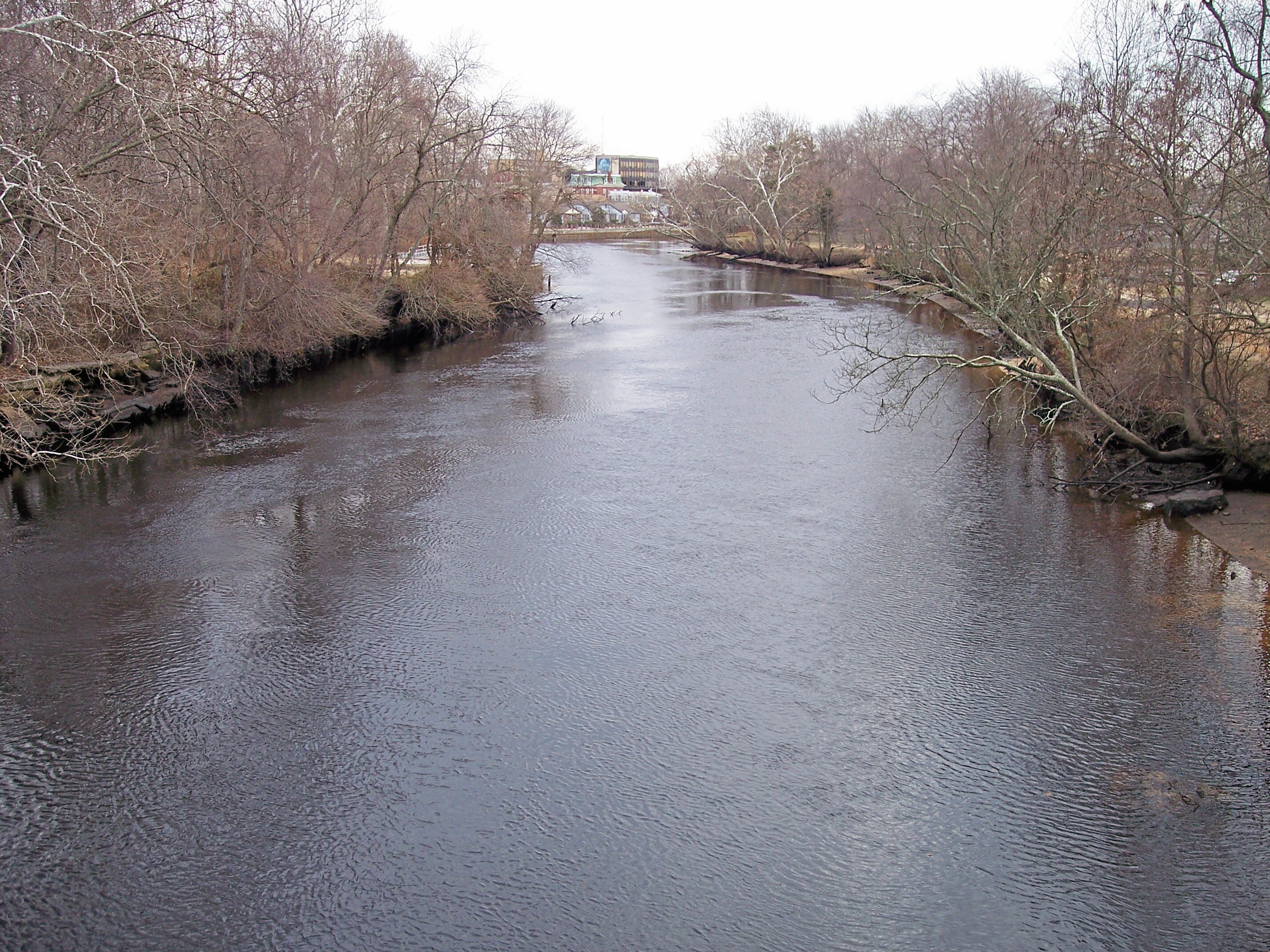
- The Maurice River in Millville

- Location of the mouth in Cumberland County, New Jersey

Location
- Country: United States
- State: New Jersey
- Counties: Salem and Cumberland
- Cities: Vineland, Millville

Physical characteristics
- Source
  - location: Pittsgrove Township
- Source confluence: Still Run and Scotland Run
  - coordinates: 39.5501153°N 75.0710102°W
- Mouth: Delaware Bay
- Length: 50 mi (80 km)approx.
- Basin size: 386 sq mi (1,000 km^{2})approx.
- Discharge
  - location: Norma (Pittsgrove Township)
  - average: 117 cu ft/s (3.3 m^{3}/s)
  - minimum: 24 cu ft/s (0.68 m^{3}/s)1966
  - maximum: 922 cu ft/s (26.1 m^{3}/s)1940

Basin features
- Tributaries
  - left: Burnt Mill Branch, Blackwater Branch, Little Robin Branch, Parvin Branch, Manantico Creek, Manumuskin River, Muskee Creek, Little Mill Creek
  - right: Green Branch, Muddy Run, Mill Creek, White Marsh Run, Buckshutem Creek, Steep Run, Peterson Run, Sheppards Branch

National Wild and Scenic River
- Type: Scenic, Recreational
- Designated: December 1, 1993

The Maurice River (/ˈmɔːrɪs/) is a tributary of Delaware Bay in Salem County and Cumberland County, New Jersey in the United States. The river was named for Maurice, Prince of Orange.

== Watershed and course ==
The Maurice River, pronounced "MAW-ris", is approximately 50 miles (80 km) long with a drainage area of 386 square miles (1,000 km^{2}). It is the second longest and second largest tributary to Delaware Bay. Its watershed includes an extensive southern portion of the coastal forested wetlands known as the Pine Barrens. Its mouth on Delaware Bay is surrounded by extensive salt marshes and has provided a historically important oystering ground.

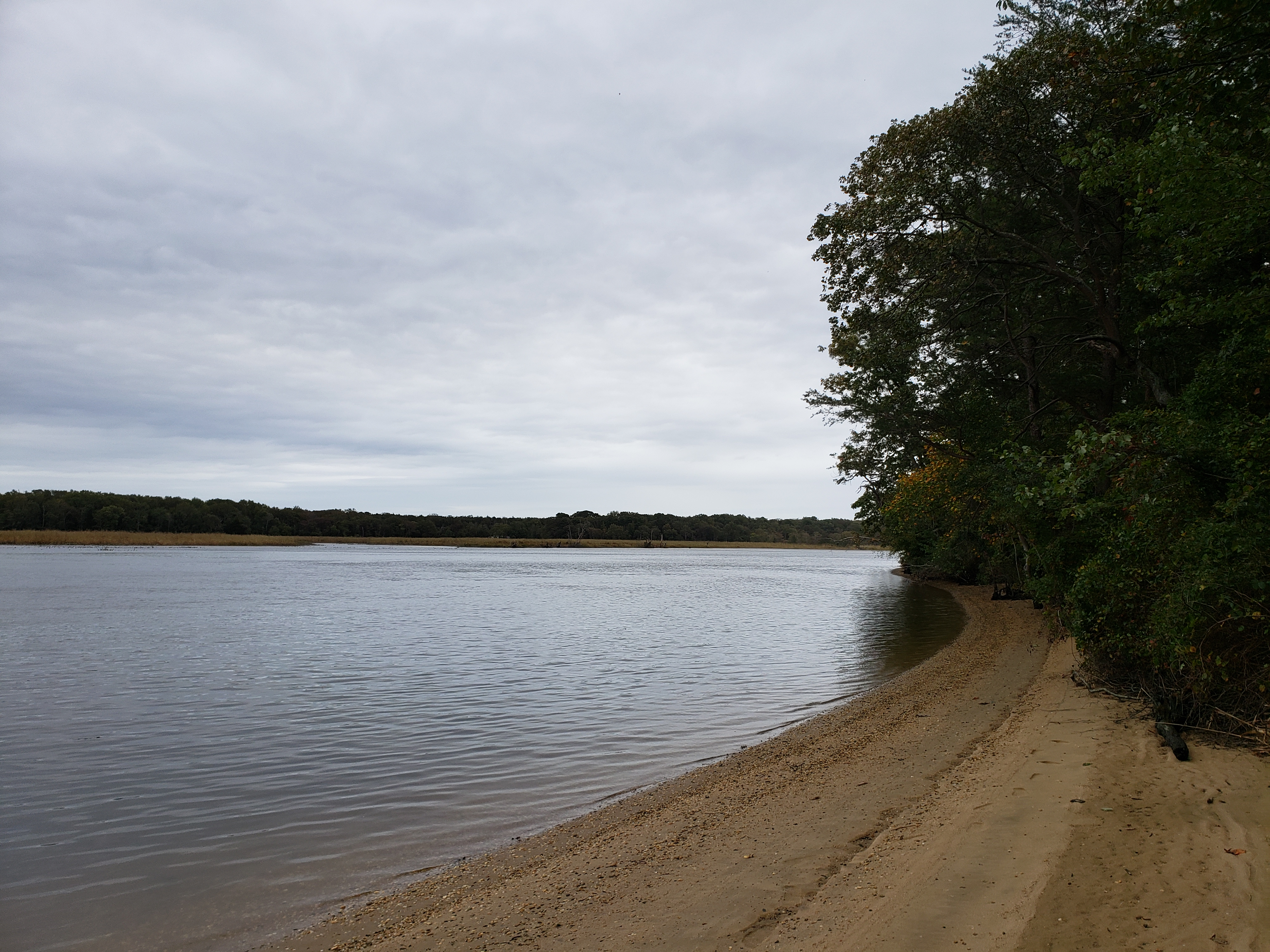
The Maurice River from the Maurice River Bluffs Preserve

It is born at the confluence of Still Run and Scotland Run, beneath the waters of Willow Grove Lake in Pittsgrove, Salem County and flows generally south-southeast, passing 2 miles (3 km) west of Vineland. At Millville it is impounded to form the Union Lake reservoir, approximately 3 miles (5 km) long. South of Millville it becomes navigable, forming a 10-mile (16 km) estuary that empties into Maurice River Cove on Delaware Bay. The estuary is joined from the northeast by Menantico Creek, the Manumuskin River, and Muskee Creek.

== Water quality and stewardship ==
The river is considered especially pristine for the region, forming a critical ecological link between the Pine Barrens and the Delaware Bay systems, except that the State of New Jersey advises against eating more than 8 ounces (230 g) of fish caught in the river in any week or month, depending on the species, for the general population and advises against eating any fish from the Maurice River for the High Risk population. It is the location of one of the few stands of wild rice in New Jersey, and provides habitat for 53 percent of the species in New Jersey designated as endangered. In 1993, Congress designated 28.9 miles (46.5 km) of the river and its tributaries as the Maurice National Scenic and Recreational River, as part of the National Wild and Scenic Rivers program.

A local nonprofit organization, Citizens United to Protect the Maurice River and Its Tributaries, Inc., is a regional watershed organization that focuses its work on the Maurice River watershed, from Willow Grove Lake southward. The South Jersey Land and Water Trust focuses on the northern portion of the watershed, from Willow Grove Lake northward.

== Tributaries ==
- Menantico Creek
- Manumuskin River
- Muddy Run

== See also ==
- List of New Jersey rivers
