= Still Run (Maurice River tributary) =

Coordinates: 39°39′05″N 75°06′26″W

Still Run is a 13.0-mile-long (20.9 km) tributary of the Maurice River in southwestern New Jersey in the United States.

== See also ==
- List of rivers of New Jersey
