= Muddy Run (Maurice River tributary) =

River in New Jersey, United States

Coordinates: 39°36′47″N 75°10′06″W

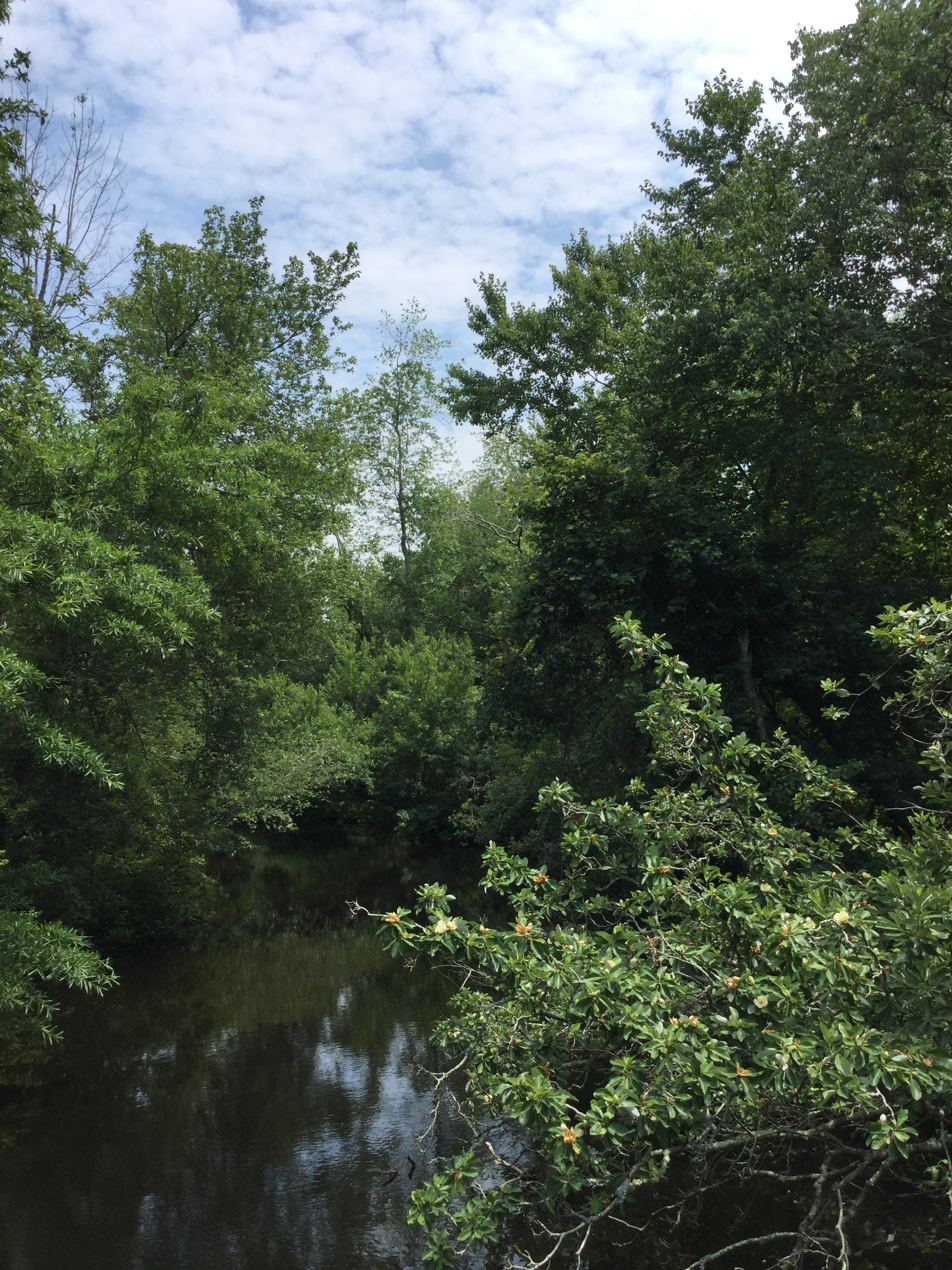
Muddy Run flowing through Parvin State Park

Muddy Run is a 17.6-mile-long (28.3 km) tributary of the Maurice River in southwestern New Jersey in the United States. It flows in a generally southeastern direction through southern Gloucester County.

Muddy Run begins at Palatine Lake and next travels southeast to Centerton Pond, then on to Parvin State Park and Parvin Lake. All are in Salem County including the last lake in the Muddy Run chain, known as Rainbow Lake. Approximately 3 miles further South, it joins the Maurice River, where it also passes into Cumberland County at a place long known as Indian Head. Indian Head was named due to the numerous arrowheads found at that location, and it was also known as a meeting-place for the various Native American Indian tribes (Manitaco, Manumuskin) that traveled these rivers.

== See also ==
- List of rivers of New Jersey
