= Scotland Run =

River in New Jersey, United States

Coordinates: 39.66732°N 75.043659°W

Scotland Run is a 13.7-mile-long (22.0 km) tributary of the Maurice River in southwestern New Jersey in the United States.

It flows in a generally southern direction through southern Gloucester County.

== See also ==
- List of rivers of New Jersey
