= Manumuskin River =

Coordinates: 39°20′43″N 74°57′43″W

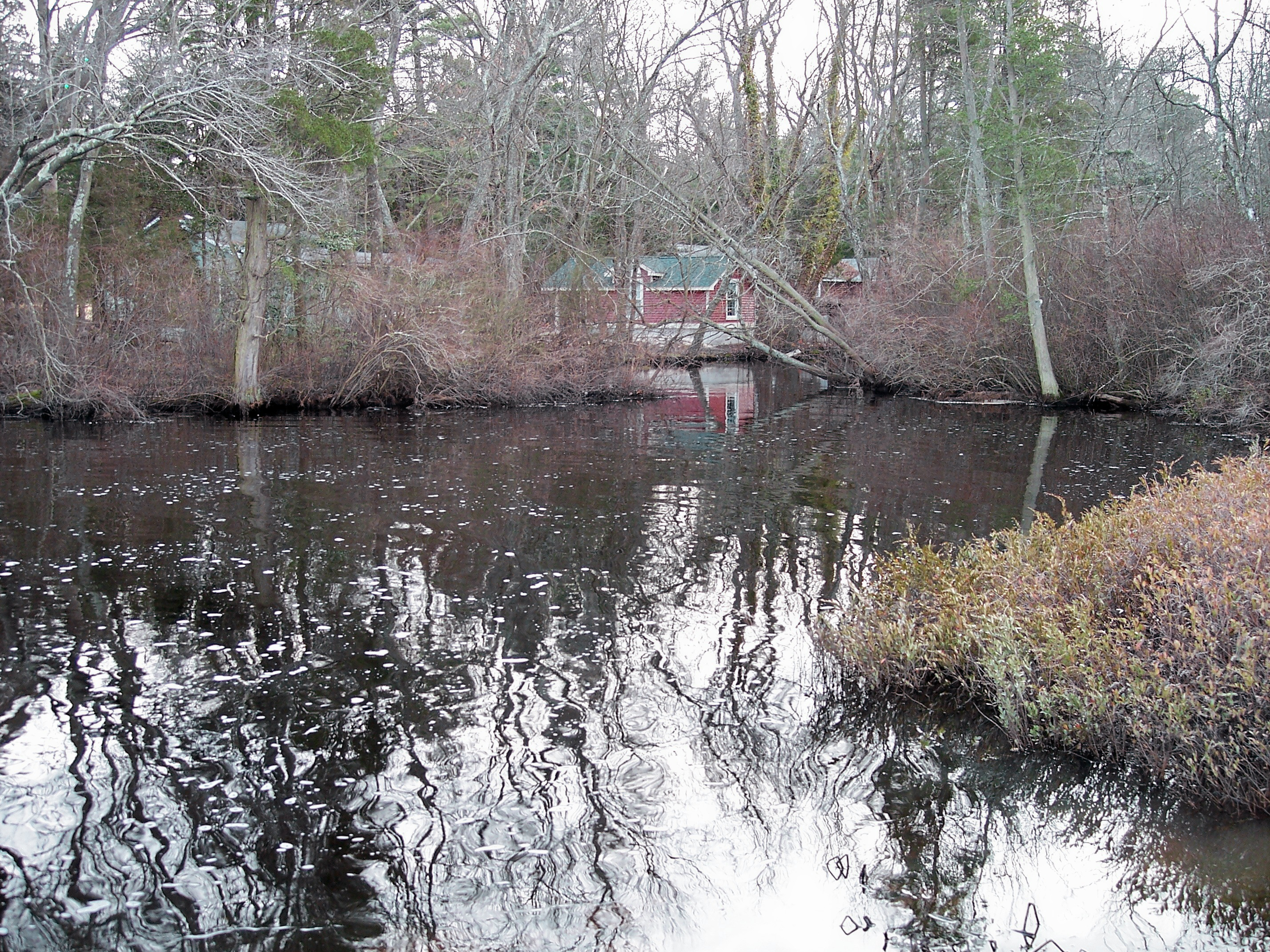
- The Manumuskin River in Maurice River Township in 2006

National Wild and Scenic River
- Designated: December 1, 1993

The Manumuskin River is a 16.3-mile-long (26.2 km) tributary of the Maurice River in Cumberland County, New Jersey in the United States.

The Manumuskin River flows through a relatively pristine forested area in the southern Pine Barrens of Cumberland County, as well as Atlantic white cedar bogs and salt marshes in its lower reaches. The name is of Lenape origin.

It rises approximately 5 miles (8 km) east of Vineland and flows south-southwest, joining the navigable estuary of the Maurice from the northeast approximately 5 miles (8 km) south-southeast of Millville and approximately 7 miles (11 km) upstream from the mouth of the Maurice on Delaware Bay.

Approximately 3,500 acres (1,400 ha) of the watershed of the river are included in the Manumuskin River Preserve, established in 1983, the largest conservancy of its kind in New Jersey. Parts of the river are also designed as part of the Maurice Wild and Scenic River.

A local nonprofit organization, Citizens United to Protect the Maurice River and Its Tributaries, Inc., is a regional watershed organization that focuses its work on the Maurice River watershed, which includes the Manumuskin.

== See also ==
- List of rivers of New Jersey
