= Manantico Creek =

Coordinates: 39.414371°N 74.977674°W

- Location within New Jersey

Location
- Country: United States

National Wild and Scenic Rivers System
- Designated: December 1, 1993

Manantico Creek, spelled Menantico on federal maps, is an 11.1-mile-long (17.9 km) tributary of the Maurice River in Cumberland County, New Jersey in the United States.

Menantico Creek begins in Cumberland County at the confluence of Cedar and Panther Branches, .75 miles (1.2 km) north of Hance Bridge. It flows south/southwest down the eastern forested side of Vineland, through Menantico Lake, then, several miles downstream, meanders through Menantico Ponds.

It joins the tidal Maurice River a few miles downstream of Millville approximately 0.5 miles (0.8 km) below Route 47.

== See also ==
- List of rivers of New Jersey
