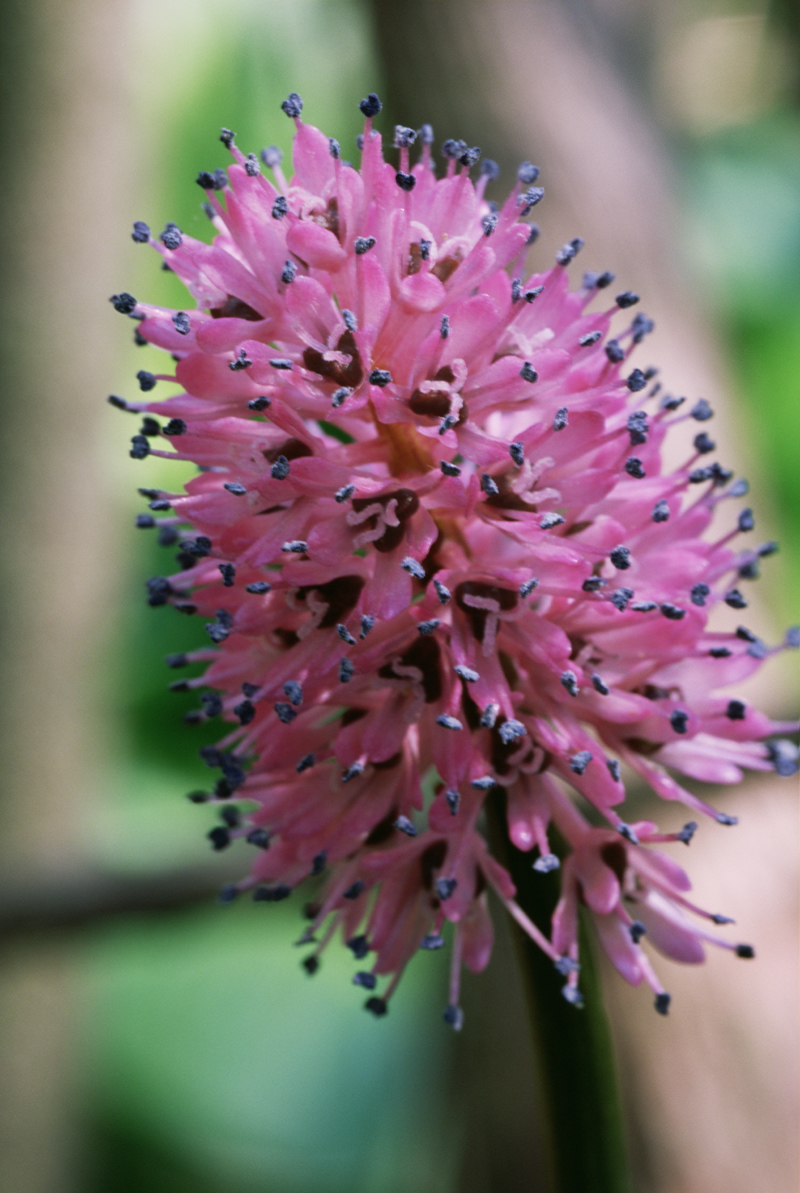

Conservation status
- Vulnerable (NatureServe)

- Threatened (ESA)

Scientific classification
- Kingdom: Plantae
- Clade: Tracheophytes
- Clade: Angiosperms
- Clade: Monocots
- Order: Liliales
- Family: Melanthiaceae
- Genus: Helonias
- Species: H. bullata

Binomial name
- Helonias bullata L.

Synonyms
- Helonias lanceolata Sims; Helonias latifolia Michx.; Helonias scapigera Stokes; Helonias striata Raf.; Veratrum americanum Mill.

= Helonias bullata =

Genus of flowering plants

Helonias bullata, the swamp pink, is a rare perennial rhizomatous herb native to the eastern United States. The root system is extensive in comparison to the apparent size of the plant on the surface. Blooming in March to May, its fragrant flowers are pink and occur in a cluster at the end a vertical spike which may reach up to 3 ft (0.91 m) in height. It has evergreen, lance-shaped, and parallel-veined leaves ranging from dark green to light yellow green in color that form a basal rosette.

Swamp pink is a federally threatened species that was historically distributed from Staten Island, New York to the southern Appalachians. New Jersey supports the majority of the global population, but there are populations in six other states: Delaware; Maryland; Virginia; West Virginia; North Carolina; South Carolina, and Georgia. There is also some unverified indication that a population of swamp pink has survived on Staten Island. Populations of swamp pink are on occasion subject to poaching by plant enthusiasts and others who prize the early bright pink blooms. The poached plants likely do not survive their move owing to the high sensitivity to being removed from the water saturated environment, underestimation of the size of the root mass, and failure to replicate the necessary environment sufficiently.

The United States Fish and Wildlife Service has instituted a volunteer monitoring project, "Adopt-a-Swamp-Pink Population". The program has been further expanded by a joint volunteer effort with Citizens United to Protect the Maurice River and Its Tributaries, Inc. The survey results are shared with U.S.F.W.S. and the New Jersey Natural Heritage database.

== Habitats ==
Swamp pink occurs in wetland habitats and it requires habitat which is saturated with water. It is flood tolerant but does not appear capable of adapting to floods of long duration. Ideally the plant prefers an environment where the water table is consistently high and near its root system, but not persistently covering the basal rosette. Typical areas include freshwater wetlands of the Atlantic Coastal Plain, swampy forested wetlands which border small streams; meadows, and spring seepage areas. In the southern Appalachians it occurs in bogs and pocosins.

== Variation in genetic diversity ==
=== Low genetic diversity ===
Many extant populations suffer low genetic diversity. This could be explained as a result of high self-fertilization rate due to harsh environmental conditions that affect successful cross-fertilization, such as limited seed dispersal range and browsing from predators.

=== Mechanisms of seed dispersal ===
Helonias seeds have a lipid structure that allows seed dispersal through water. This is a result of natural selection considering the 'watery' habitat (i.e. swamp and wetland) of Helonias, and it accounts for the long-distance seed dispersal. It is also known that ants actively engage in Helonias seed dispersal.

=== Limitations in seed dispersal ===
Although ants can help facilitate the dispersal process, the soil in such watery environment is saturated and makes it difficult for ants to co-habitate with Helonias, lowering the rate of short-distance seed dispersal. The low rate of seed dispersal is also due to limited wind. The seeds are light enough to be dispersed by wind, but low levels of wind prevent the seeds from dispersing further away, resulting in a clustered population of Helonias.

=== Risks of self-fertilization ===
Low dispersal increases the risk of self-fertilization. In an evolutionary perspective, this is highly disadvantageous when there is a sudden change in the environment. Since genetic diversity is low, if a predominant trait among the population is selected against, the whole population faces the risk of being wiped out. In the long run, seeds that lure more animals will be favored by selection as opposed to seeds that are lighter, because the seeds dispersed by the animals will be spread over a larger range compared to that of lighter seeds, resulting in a lower risk of self-fertilization.

== Threats ==
The brilliant pink color of the Helonias flowers attracts poachers. Helonias is a perennial and flowers before other spring plants, making it more visible to the poachers. It can also be trampled and is vulnerable to the effects of soil compaction. These factors contribute to the threatened status of Helonias.

== Gallery ==
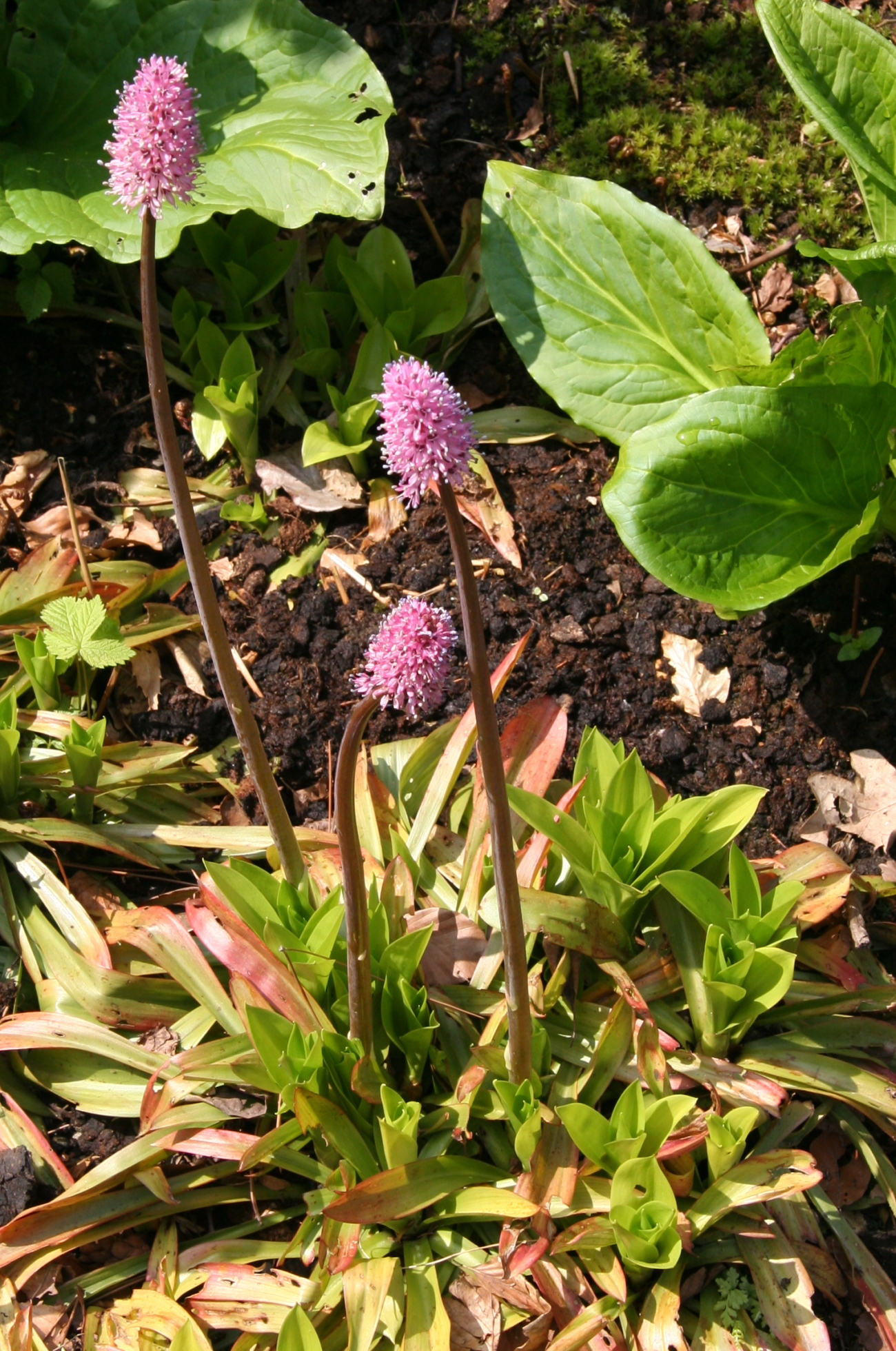
H. bullata at Dresden Botanical Garden, Dresden, Germany.

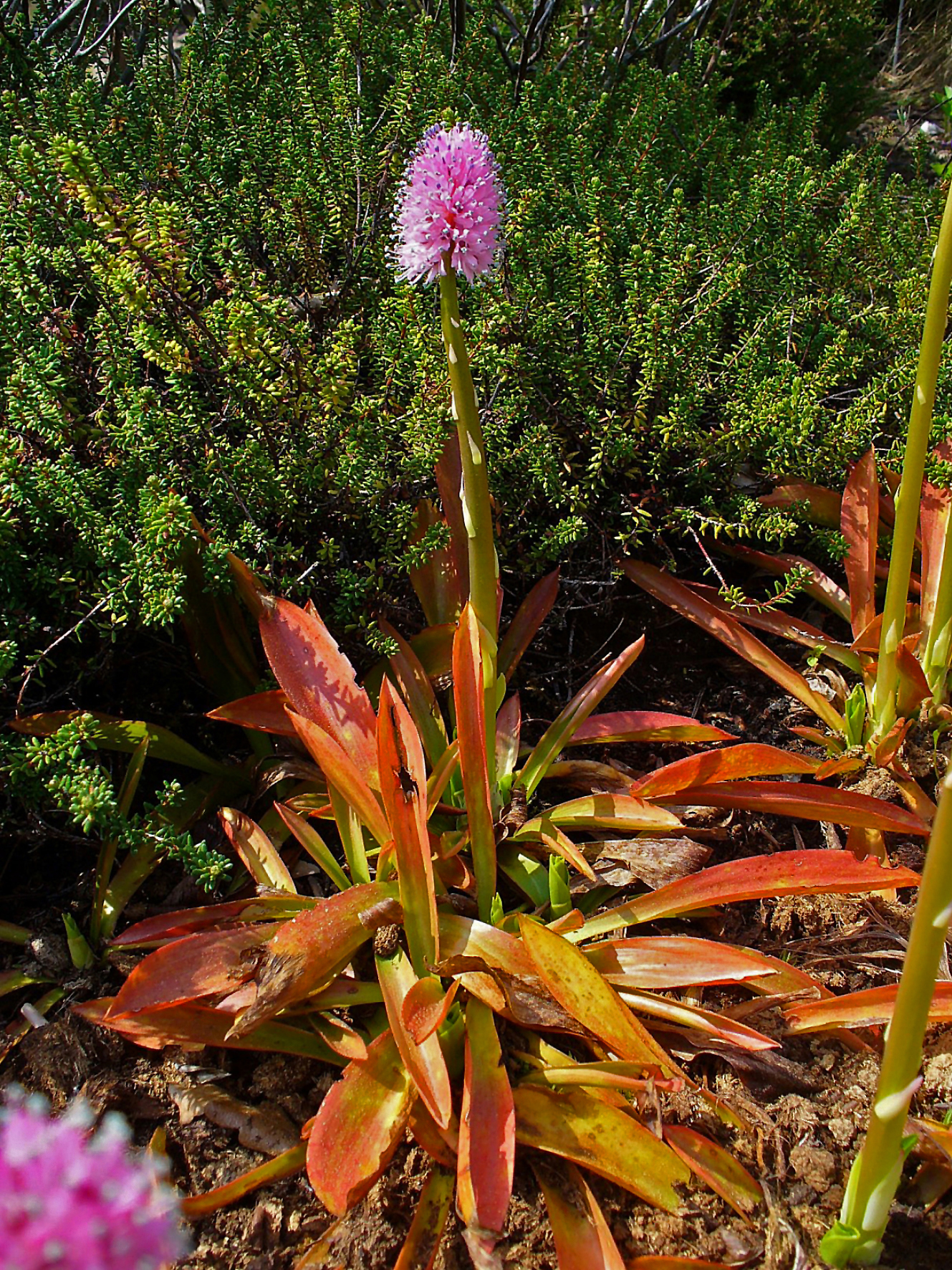
Showing autumn color, at Botanical Garden of the KIT, Karlsruhe, Germany.

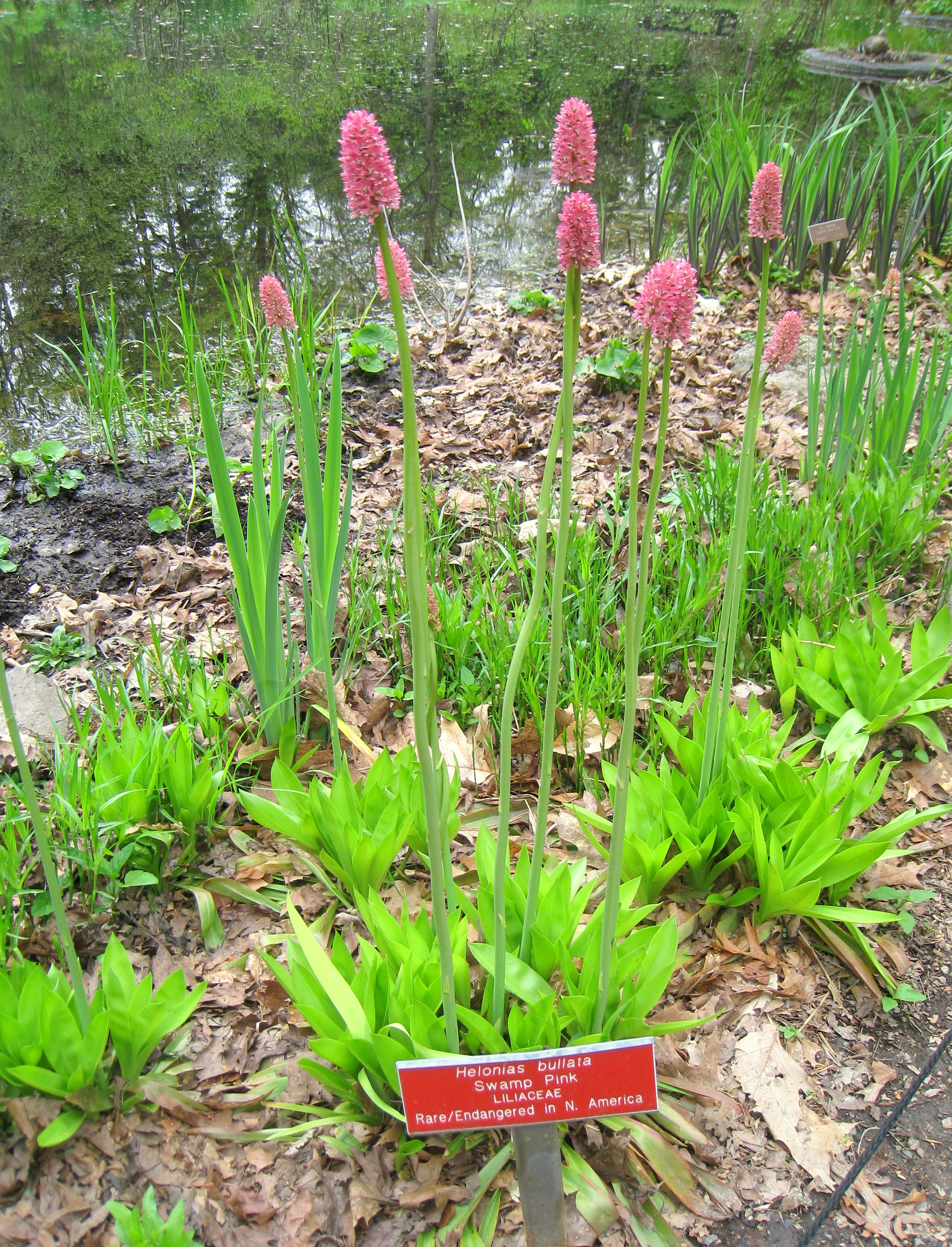
At Garden in the Woods, Framingham, Massachusetts.
