= SS Jonathan Elmer =

Liberty ship of WWII

History

United States
- Name: Jonathan Elmer
- Namesake: Jonathan Elmer
- Owner: War Shipping Administration (WSA)
- Operator: Marine Transport Lines, Inc.
- Ordered: as type (EC2-S-C1) hull, MCE hull 308
- Awarded: 1 May 1941
- Builder: Bethlehem-Fairfield Shipyard, Baltimore, Maryland
- Cost: $1,068,439
- Yard number: 2058
- Way number: 10
- Laid down: 11 July 1942
- Launched: 31 August 1942
- Sponsored by: Mrs. Tanya Fettweis
- Completed: 14 September 1942
- Identification: Call sign: KHAP
- Fate: Laid up in the James River Reserve Fleet, Lee Hall, Virginia, 13 May 1946; Sold for scrapping, 18 September 1958, withdrawn from fleet, 2 February 1960

General characteristics
- Class & type: Liberty ship; type EC2-S-C1, standard
- Tonnage: 10,865 LT DWT; 7,176 GRT
- Displacement: 3,380 long tons (3,434 t) (light); 14,245 long tons (14,474 t) (max)
- Length: 441 feet 6 inches (135 m) oa; 416 feet (127 m) pp; 427 feet (130 m) lwl
- Beam: 57 feet (17 m)
- Draft: 27 ft 9.25 in (8.4646 m)
- Installed power: 2 × Oil fired 450 °F (232 °C) boilers, operating at 220 psi (1,500 kPa); 2,500 hp (1,900 kW)
- Propulsion: 1 × triple-expansion steam engine, (manufactured by General Machinery Corp., Hamilton, Ohio); 1 × screw propeller
- Speed: 11.5 knots (21.3 km/h; 13.2 mph)
- Capacity: 562,608 cubic feet (15,931 m^{3}) (grain); 499,573 cubic feet (14,146 m^{3}) (bale)
- Complement: 38–62 USMM; 21–40 USNAG
- Armament: Varied by ship; Bow-mounted 3-inch (76 mm)/50-caliber gun; Stern-mounted 4-inch (102 mm)/50-caliber gun; 2–8 × single 20-millimeter (0.79 in) Oerlikon anti-aircraft (AA) cannons and/or, 2–8 × 37-millimeter (1.46 in) M1 AA guns

SS Jonathan Elmer was a Liberty ship built in the United States during World War II. She was named after Jonathan Elmer, an American politician and delegate to the Continental Congress three times: 1777 to 1778, 1781 to 1783, and 1787 to 1788. In 1780 and 1784 he represented Cumberland County in the New Jersey Legislative Council. The College of New Jersey (now known as Princeton University) made Elmer a trustee in 1782. He served in that position until 1795. The New Jersey Legislature appointed Elmer to the United States Senate for the term of 4 March 1789 to 3 March 1791.

== Construction ==
Jonathan Elmer was laid down on 11 July 1942, under a Maritime Commission (MARCOM) contract, MCE hull 308, by the Bethlehem-Fairfield Shipyard, Baltimore, Maryland; she was sponsored by Mrs. Tanya Fettweis, the wife a yard employee, and was launched on 31 August 1942.

== History ==
She was allocated to Marine Transport Lines, Inc., on 14 September 1942. On 13 May 1946, she was laid up in the James River Reserve Fleet, Lee Hall, Virginia. On 18 September 1958, she was sold for scrapping to Bethlehem Steel Co., for $76,191. She was removed from the fleet on 2 February 1960.

== Bibliography ==
- "Bethlehem-Fairfield, Baltimore MD". www.ShipbuildingHistory.com. 14 August 2008.
- Maritime Administration. "Jonathan Elmer". Ship History Database Vessel Status Card. U.S. Department of Transportation, Maritime Administration.
- Davies, James (May 2004). "Specifications (As-Built)" (PDF). p. 23.
- "SS Jonathan Elmer".
