= Bridgeton Historic District =

Bridgeton Historic District may refer to:

- Bridgeton Historic District (Bridgeton, Indiana)
- Bridgeton Historic District (Bridgeton, New Jersey)
