= Bivalve Oyster Packing Houses and Docks =

- U.S. National Register of Historic Places
- New Jersey Register of Historic Places
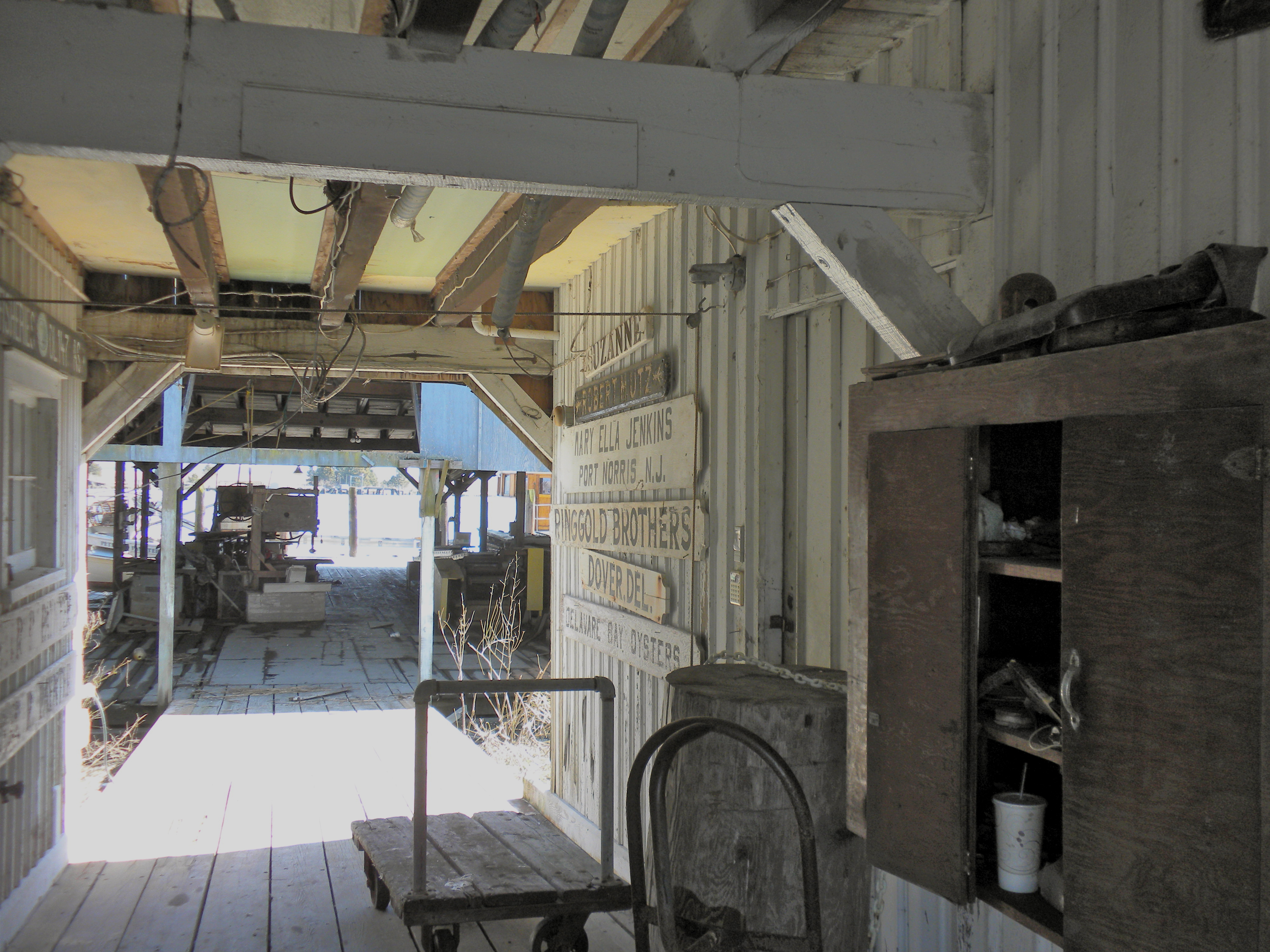

- Location within Cumberland County, New Jersey Location within New Jersey Location within the United States
- Location: Shell Road, Miller and Howard Streets, Commercial Township, New Jersey
- Coordinates: 39°14′0″N 75°1′56″W
- Area: 1.5 acres (0.61 ha)
- MPS: Marine and Architectural Resources of the Maurice River Cove MPDF
- NRHP reference No.: 96000079
- NJRHP No.: 3069

Significant dates
- Added to NRHP: February 28, 1996
- Designated NJRHP: December 11, 1995

The Bivalve Oyster Packing Houses and Docks are located along Shell Road in the Bivalve section of Commercial Township in Cumberland County, New Jersey. They were added to the National Register of Historic Places on February 28, 1996, for their significance in commerce and maritime history during the years 1870–1945. The listing includes five contributing buildings. The buildings were listed as part of the Marine and Architectural Resources of the Maurice River Cove Multiple Property Documentation Form (MPDF). The Bayshore Center, an educational museum, is located adjacent to the property at 2800 High Street.

== History and description ==
The buildings were constructed in the 1870s in this industrial section of Port Norris, located by the mouth of the Maurice River.

The oyster schooners Cashier and A. J. Meerwald, also listed on the NRHP, are located here.

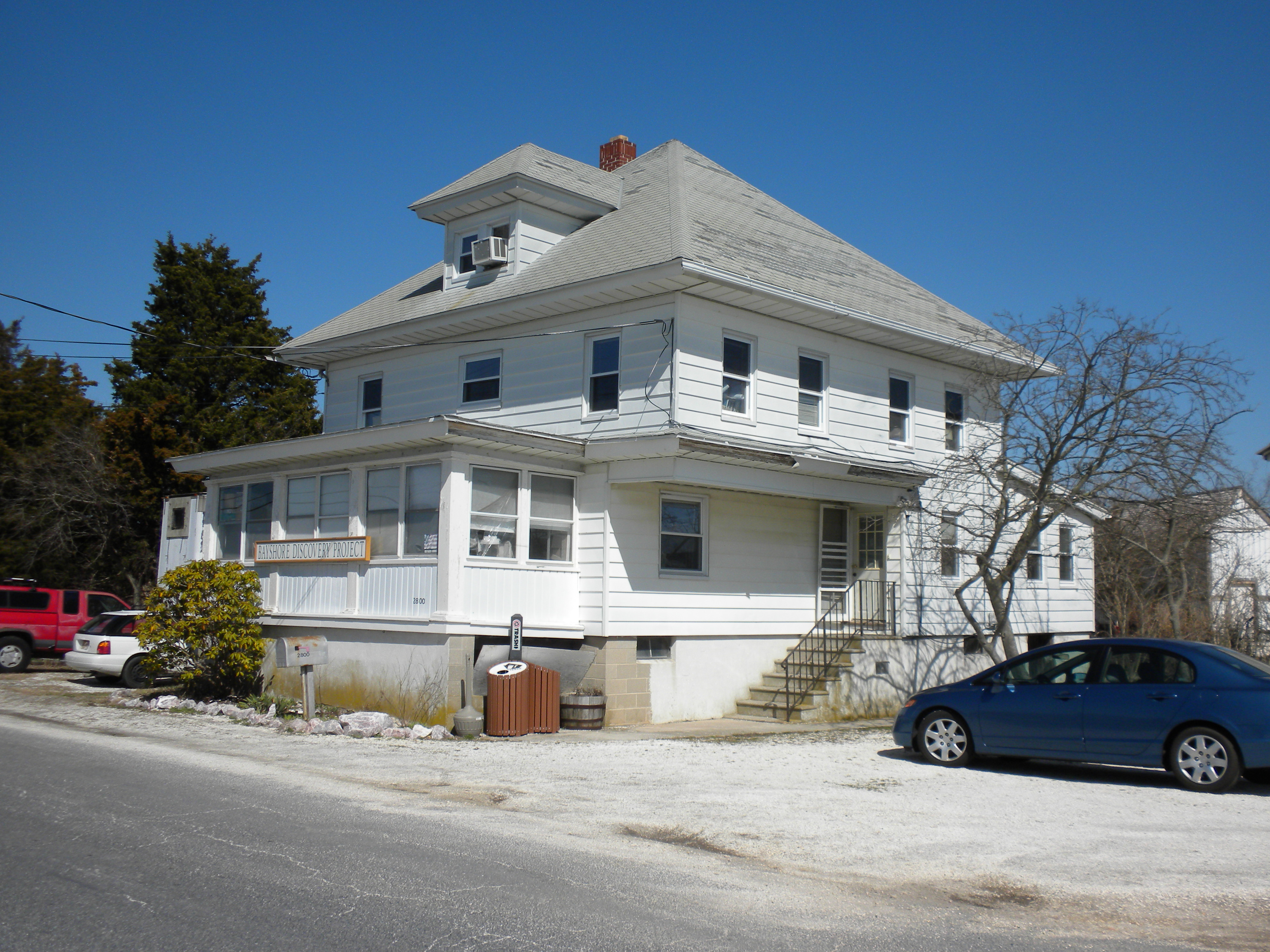
Bayshore Center at Bivalve

== See also ==
- National Register of Historic Places listings in Cumberland County, New Jersey
