= Jeremiah Buck House =

Historic house in New Jersey, United States

- U.S. National Register of Historic Places
- U.S. Historic district – Contributing property
- New Jersey Register of Historic Places
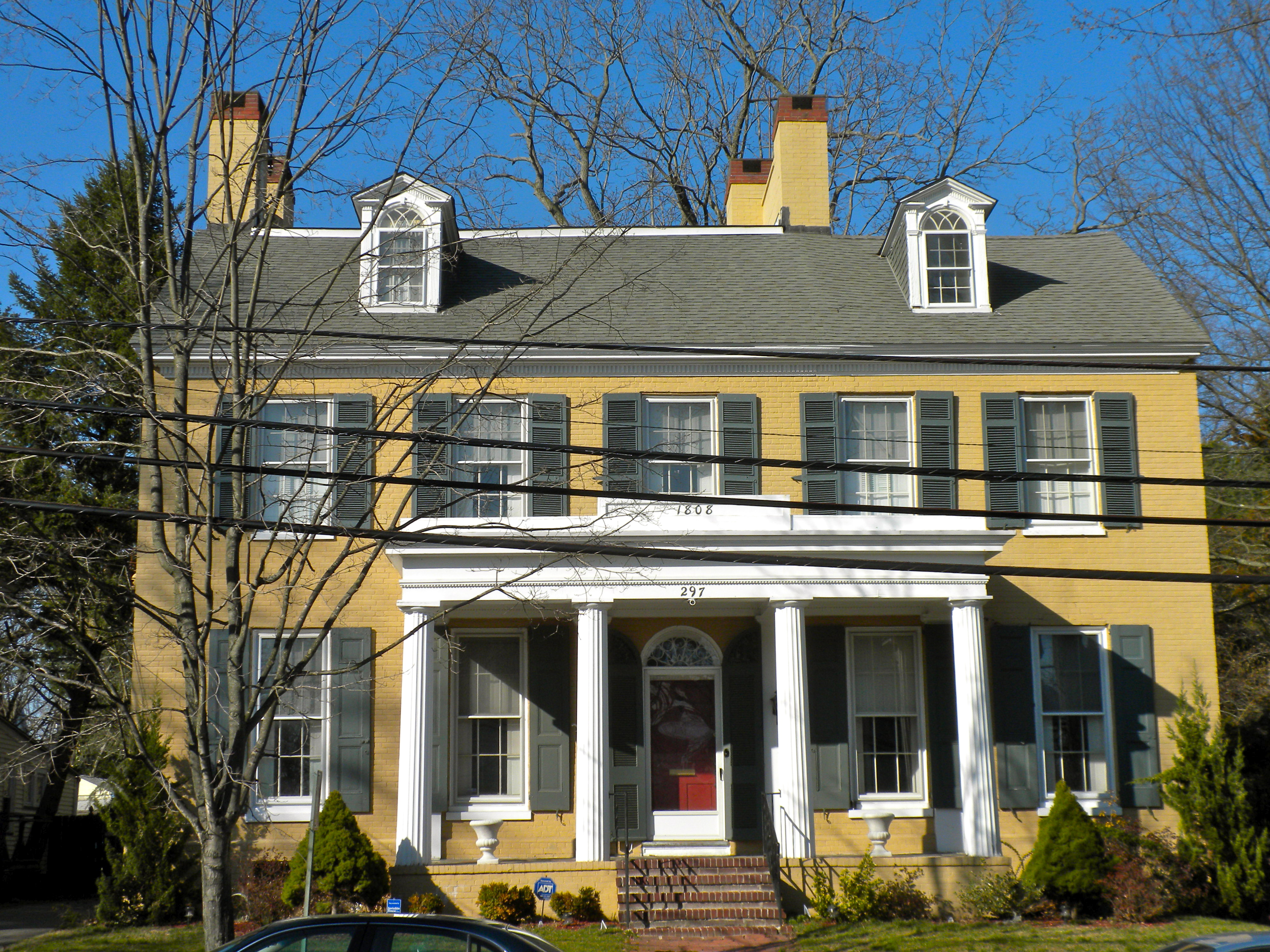

- Location within Cumberland County, New Jersey Location within New Jersey Location within the United States
- Location: 297 East Commerce Street, Bridgeton, New Jersey
- Coordinates: 39°25′43″N 75°13′36″W
- Built: 1808
- Architectural style: Federal
- Part of: Bridgeton Historic District (Bridgeton, New Jersey) (ID82001043)
- NRHP reference No.: 75001130
- NJRHP No.: 1021

Significant dates
- Added to NRHP: December 30, 1975
- Designated CP: October 29, 1982
- Designated NJRHP: October 17, 1975

The Jeremiah Buck House, also known as the Buck–Elmer House, is located at 297 East Commerce Street in the city of Bridgeton in Cumberland County, New Jersey, United States. The house was built in 1808 and was documented by the Historic American Buildings Survey (HABS) in 1939. It was added to the National Register of Historic Places on December 30, 1975, for its significance in architecture, health/medicine, industry, and politics/government. It was later added as a contributing property to the Bridgeton Historic District on October 29, 1982.

== History and description ==
The two and one-half story brick house features Federal architecture. Jeremiah Buck owned a grist mill, saw mill, and cotton and woolen factory near East Lake. Dr. William Elmer, son of Jonathan Elmer, purchased the house in 1820. His son, Jonathan Elmer, lived here next. According to the nomination form, the house is the "premier extant example of Federal architecture" in the city.

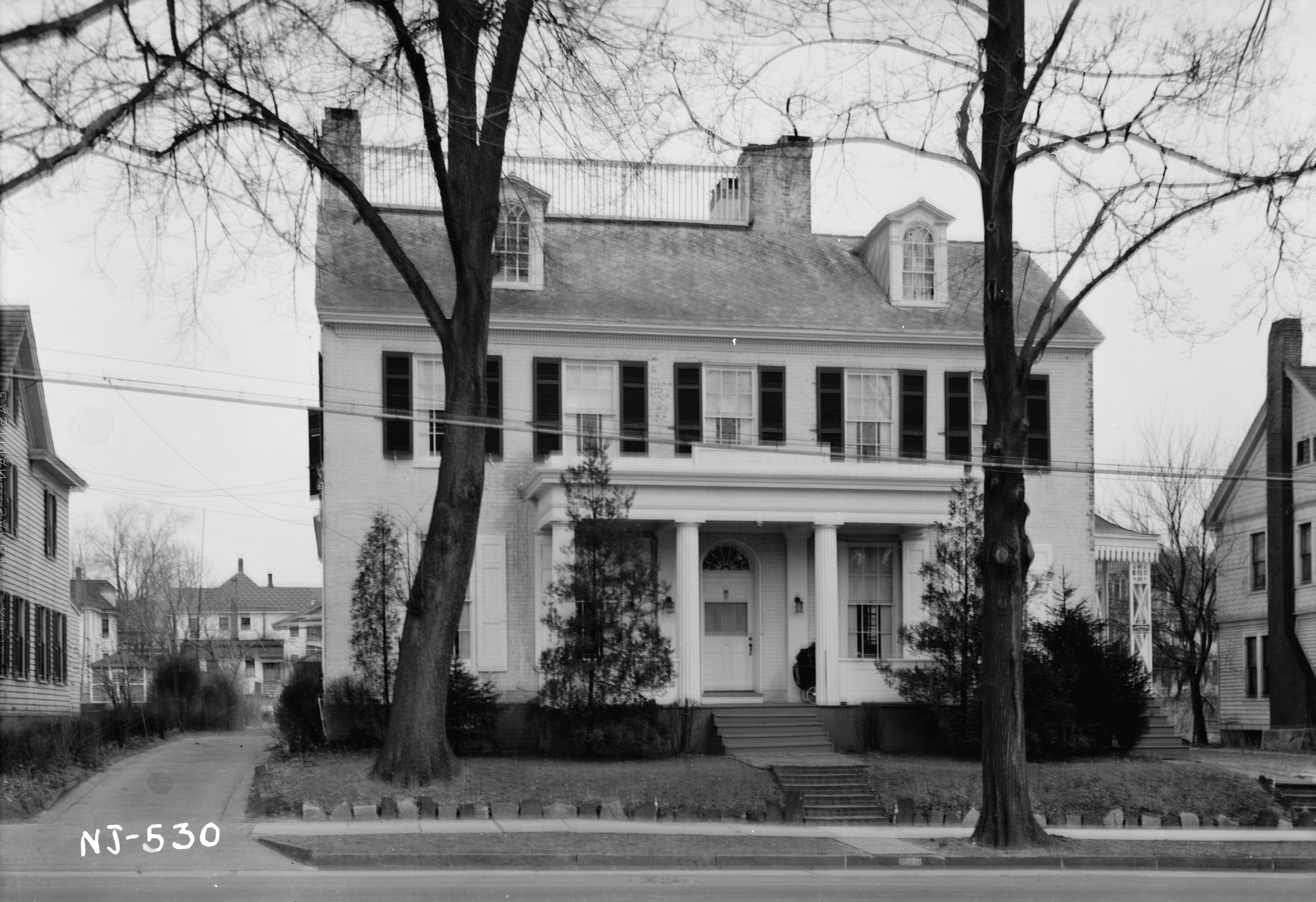
HABS photo from 1939

== See also ==
- National Register of Historic Places listings in Cumberland County, New Jersey
