= James G. Hampton =

American politician (1814-1861)

James Giles Hampton

Member of the U.S. House of Representatives from New Jersey's 1st district
- In office March 4, 1845 – March 3, 1849
- Preceded by: Lucius Elmer
- Succeeded by: Andrew K. Hay

Personal details
- Born: June 13, 1814 Bridgeton, New Jersey, US
- Died: September 22, 1861 (aged 47) Bridgeton, New Jersey, US
- Party: Whig
- Profession: Politician

James Giles Hampton (June 13, 1814 – September 22, 1861) was an American Whig Party politician who represented New Jersey's 1st congressional district in the United States House of Representatives from 1845 to 1849.

Hampton was born in Bridgeton, New Jersey on June 13, 1814. He attended the common schools. He graduated from Princeton College in 1835. He studied law, was admitted to the bar in 1839 and commenced practice in Bridgeton. He was collector of the port of Bridgeton from 1841-1844.

Hampton was elected as a Whig to the Twenty-ninth and Thirtieth Congresses, serving in office from March 4, 1845 to March 3, 1849, but was not a candidate for renomination in 1848.

After leaving Congress, he resumed the practice of law in Bridgeton. He was solicitor of the Board of Chosen Freeholders of Cumberland County in 1852. He died in Bridgeton on September 22, 1861, and was interred in that city's Old Broad Street Presbyterian Church Cemetery.

U.S. House of Representatives
Preceded by Lucius Q.C. Elmer	Member of the U.S. House of Representatives from New Jersey's 1st congressional district March 4, 1845–March 3, 1849	Succeeded by Andrew K. Hay
