= Wood Mansion House =

- U.S. National Register of Historic Places
- New Jersey Register of Historic Places
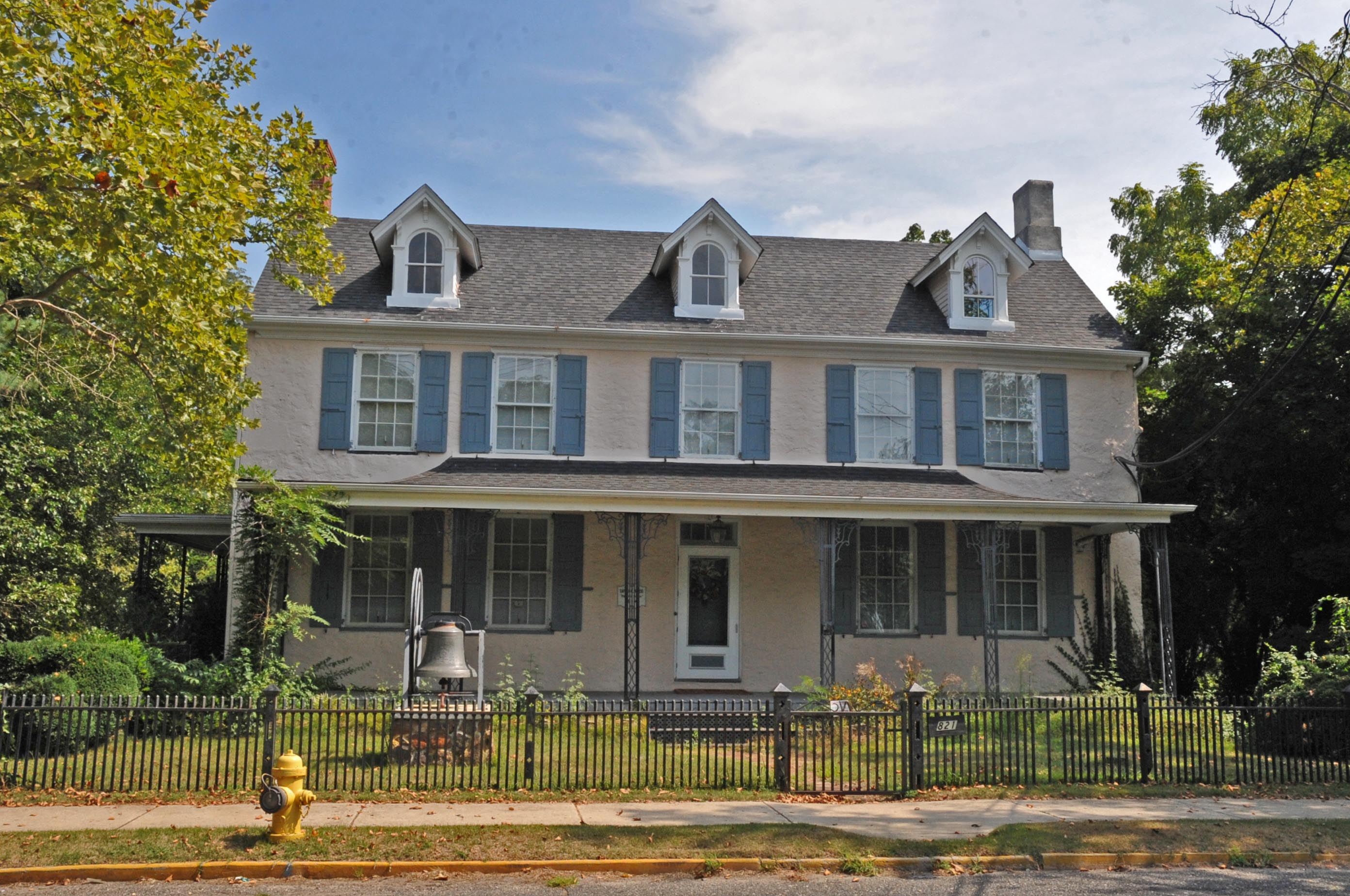
- David Wood Mansion

- Location within Cumberland County, New Jersey Location within New Jersey Location within the United States
- Location: 821 Columbia Avenue; Millville, New Jersey
- Coordinates: 39°24′10″N 75°2′42″W
- Built: c. 1814
- Architectural style: Federal, Italianate
- NRHP reference No.: 13000975
- NJRHP No.: 5098

Significant dates
- Added to NRHP: December 24, 2013
- Designated NJRHP: September 23, 2013

The Wood Mansion House, also known as the David Wood Mansion, is a historic stone house located at 821 Columbia Avenue in the city of Millville in Cumberland County, New Jersey. The oldest section of the house was built c. 1814 by David C. Wood. It was documented by the Historic American Buildings Survey in 1992. The mansion was added to the National Register of Historic Places on December 24, 2013, for its significance in the area of industry from 1814 to 1926.

== History and description ==
Industrialist David C. Wood (1781–1859) built an iron furnace here by the Maurice River in 1814. The two-story house was built in three sections. The first was built c. 1814 in Federal style, the second c. 1864 built by George Wood (1842–1926) with Italianate style, and the third c. 1864–1866.

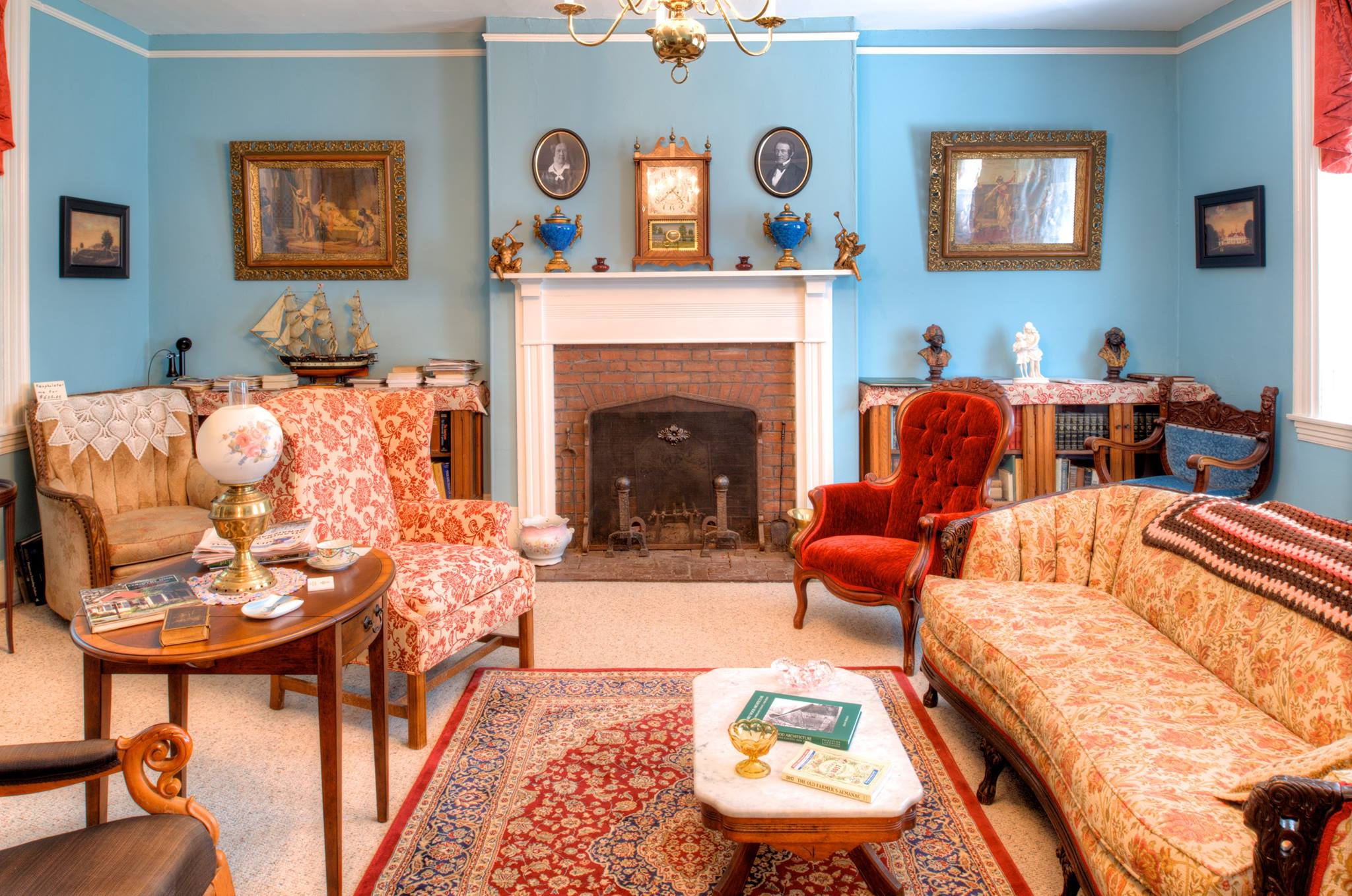
Interior

== See also ==
- National Register of Historic Places listings in Cumberland County, New Jersey
