= Millville's First Bank Building =

- U.S. National Register of Historic Places
- New Jersey Register of Historic Places
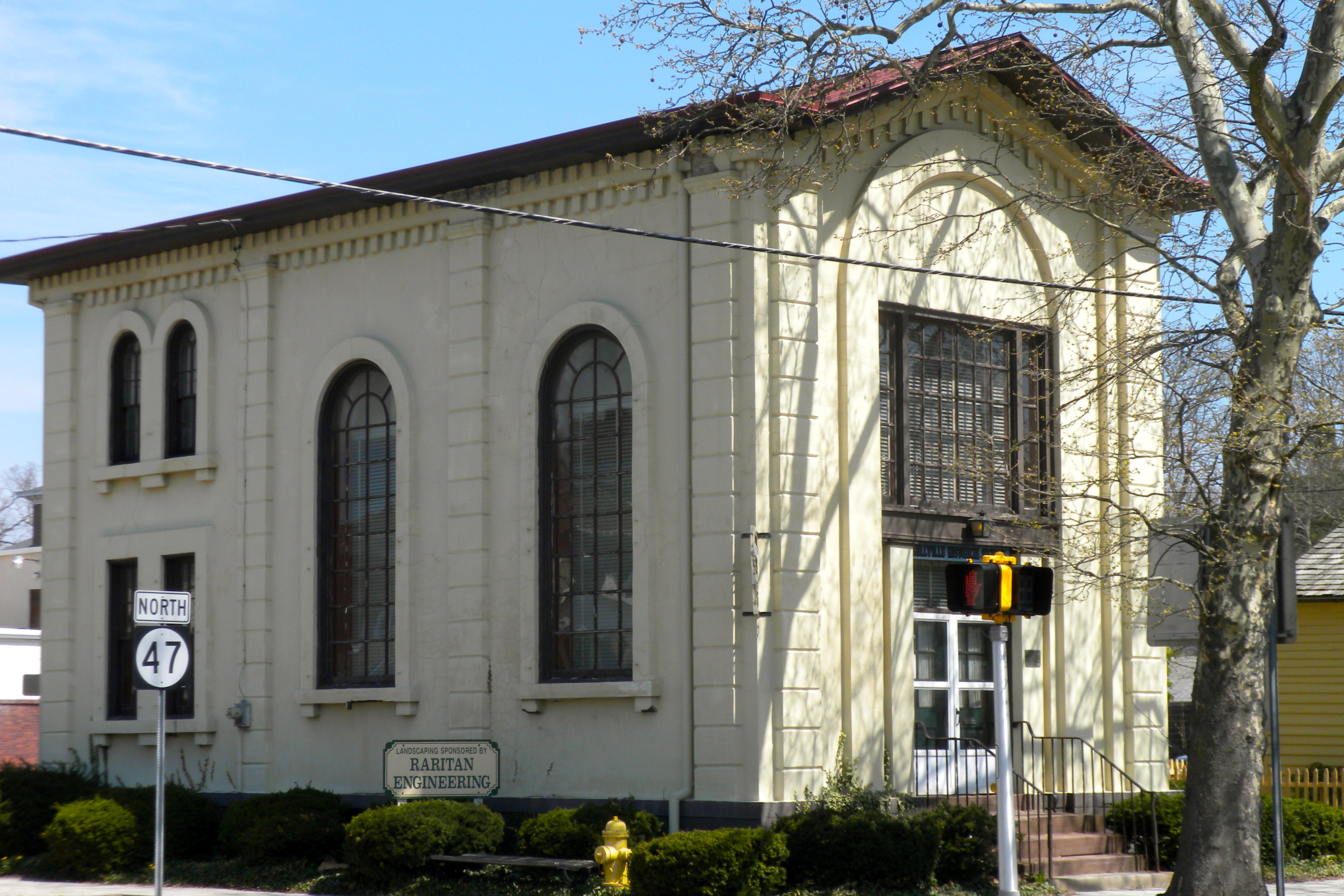

- Location within Cumberland County, New Jersey Location within New Jersey Location within the United States
- Location: 2nd and East Main Streets, Millville, New Jersey
- Coordinates: 39°23′43″N 75°2′14″W
- Area: 1.1 acres (0.45 ha)
- Built: 1857
- Architectural style: Italianate
- NRHP reference No.: 80002480
- NJRHP No.: 1048

Significant dates
- Added to NRHP: November 20, 1980
- Designated NJRHP: November 23, 1976

Millville's First Bank Building is located in Millville, Cumberland County, New Jersey, United States. The building was built in 1857 and was added to the National Register of Historic Places on November 20, 1980.

== See also ==
- National Register of Historic Places listings in Cumberland County, New Jersey
