= Indian Head Site =

- U.S. National Register of Historic Places
- New Jersey Register of Historic Places
- Location: Deerfield Township, New Jersey
- Area: 64.7 acres (26.2 ha)
- NRHP reference No.: 04001196
- NJRHP No.: 1037

Significant dates
- Added to NRHP: October 27, 2004
- Designated NJRHP: April 21, 2004

The Indian Head Site is a 64.7-acre (26.2 ha) archaeological site located along the Maurice River in Deerfield Township, Cumberland County, New Jersey, United States. Relics have been recovered here spanning nearly 10,000 years, from the Paleo-Indians to the indigenous peoples of the Eastern Woodlands. The site was added to the National Register of Historic Places on October 27, 2004.

== See also ==
- National Register of Historic Places listings in Cumberland County, New Jersey
