= Spindrift Sailing Yacht =

- U.S. National Register of Historic Places
- New Jersey Register of Historic Places
- Location within Cumberland County, New Jersey Location within New Jersey Location within the United States
- Location: Fairfield Township, New Jersey
- Coordinates: 39°22′48″N 75°13′24″W
- Area: 0 acres (0 ha)
- Built: 1882
- Architectural style: Cruising Yacht
- NRHP reference No.: 82003271
- NJRHP No.: 1043

Significant dates
- Added to NRHP: April 22, 1982
- Designated NJRHP: November 12, 1981

Spindrift Sailing Yacht is located in Fairfield Township, Cumberland County, New Jersey, United States. The yacht was built in 1882 and was added to the National Register of Historic Places on April 22, 1982.

== See also ==
- National Register of Historic Places listings in Cumberland County, New Jersey
