= James Giles (general) =

American military officer and lawyer (1759-1825)

General James Giles
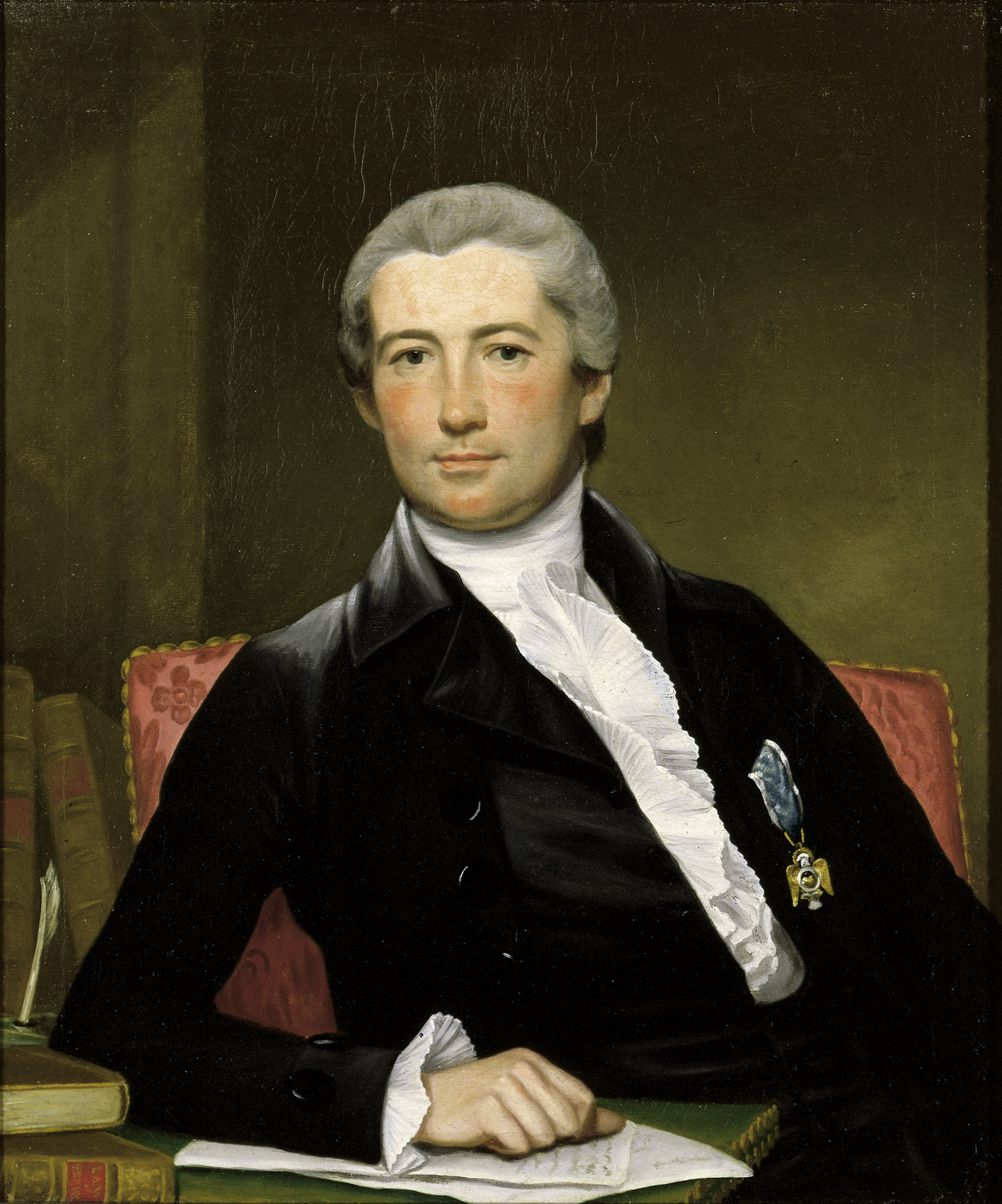
- Portrait by Joseph Wright
- Born: 1759; New York City
- Died: 23 July 1825 (aged 65–66); Bridgeton, New Jersey
- Occupations: Military officer; lawyer

James Giles (1759 – July 23, 1825) was an American military officer and lawyer from the city of Bridgeton in Cumberland County, New Jersey.

== Military service ==
On January 13, 1777, Giles began his service in the American Revolutionary War as a 2nd Lieutenant in the 2nd Continental Artillery Regiment. In 1780, he was transferred to Virginia and served under the Marquis de Lafayette, who presented him with a French infantry officer’s sword for his service. In 1781, he was appointed Regimental adjutant. In 1789, he was admitted as an original member of the Society of the Cincinnati, first in New York, then in New Jersey. In 1793, he was commissioned Brigadier General of the Cumberland Brigade of the New Jersey Militia. Giles later greeted Lafayette during his 1824 visit to the United States.

== Professional career ==
In 1782, he studied law with Joseph Bloomfield in Trenton, New Jersey and was licensed as an attorney in 1783. From 1788 to 1803, Giles served as the Clerk of Cumberland County, New Jersey. In 1790, he founded and was appointed Master of the Brearley Lodge of the Free and Accepted Masons, named after founding father David Brearley. He was the first president of the Cumberland National Bank, starting in 1816.

== Personal life ==
Giles was born in New York City around 1759. On May 23, 1784, he married Hannah Bloomfield, sister of Joseph Bloomfield. They moved to Bridgeton in 1788. He died on July 23, 1825, and was buried in the Old Broad Street Presbyterian Church Cemetery.

== Legacy ==
His residence at 143 West Broad Street in Bridgeton, now known as the General James Giles House, was added to the National Register of Historic Places in 1977.

== See also ==
- List of original members of the Society of the Cincinnati
