= Samuel W. Seeley House =

Historic house in New Jersey, United States

- U.S. National Register of Historic Places
- U.S. Historic district – Contributing property
- New Jersey Register of Historic Places
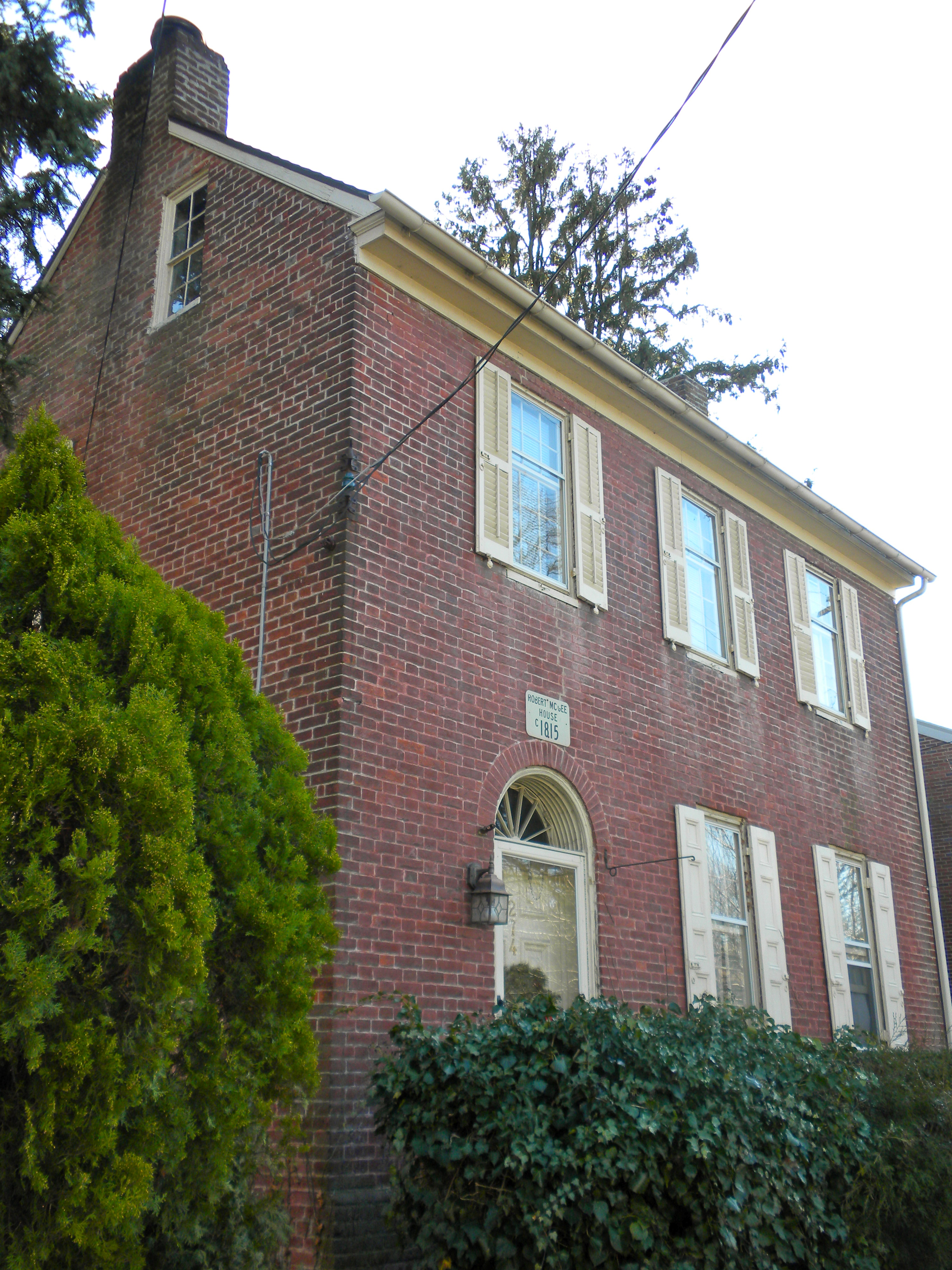

- Location within Cumberland County, New Jersey Location within New Jersey Location within the United States
- Location: 274 East Commerce Street, Bridgeton, New Jersey
- Coordinates: 39°25′41″N 75°13′37″W
- Built: c. 1799
- Architectural style: Federal
- Part of: Bridgeton Historic District (Bridgeton, New Jersey) (ID82001043)
- NRHP reference No.: 76001150
- NJRHP No.: 1032

Significant dates
- Added to NRHP: May 13, 1976
- Designated CP: October 29, 1982
- Designated NJRHP: November 18, 1975

The Samuel W. Seeley House, also known as the Robert McGee House, is located at 274 East Commerce Street in the city of Bridgeton in Cumberland County, New Jersey, United States. The oldest part of the house was built about 1799 and was documented by the Historic American Buildings Survey (HABS) in 1938. It was added to the National Register of Historic Places on May 13, 1976, for its significance in architecture. It was later added as a contributing property to the Bridgeton Historic District on October 29, 1982.

== History and description ==
Samuel W. Seeley built a two story brick house about 1799. Robert McGee enlarged it in 1815. According to the nomination form, the house is "one of the few remaining residences in Bridgeton constructed during the Federal period."

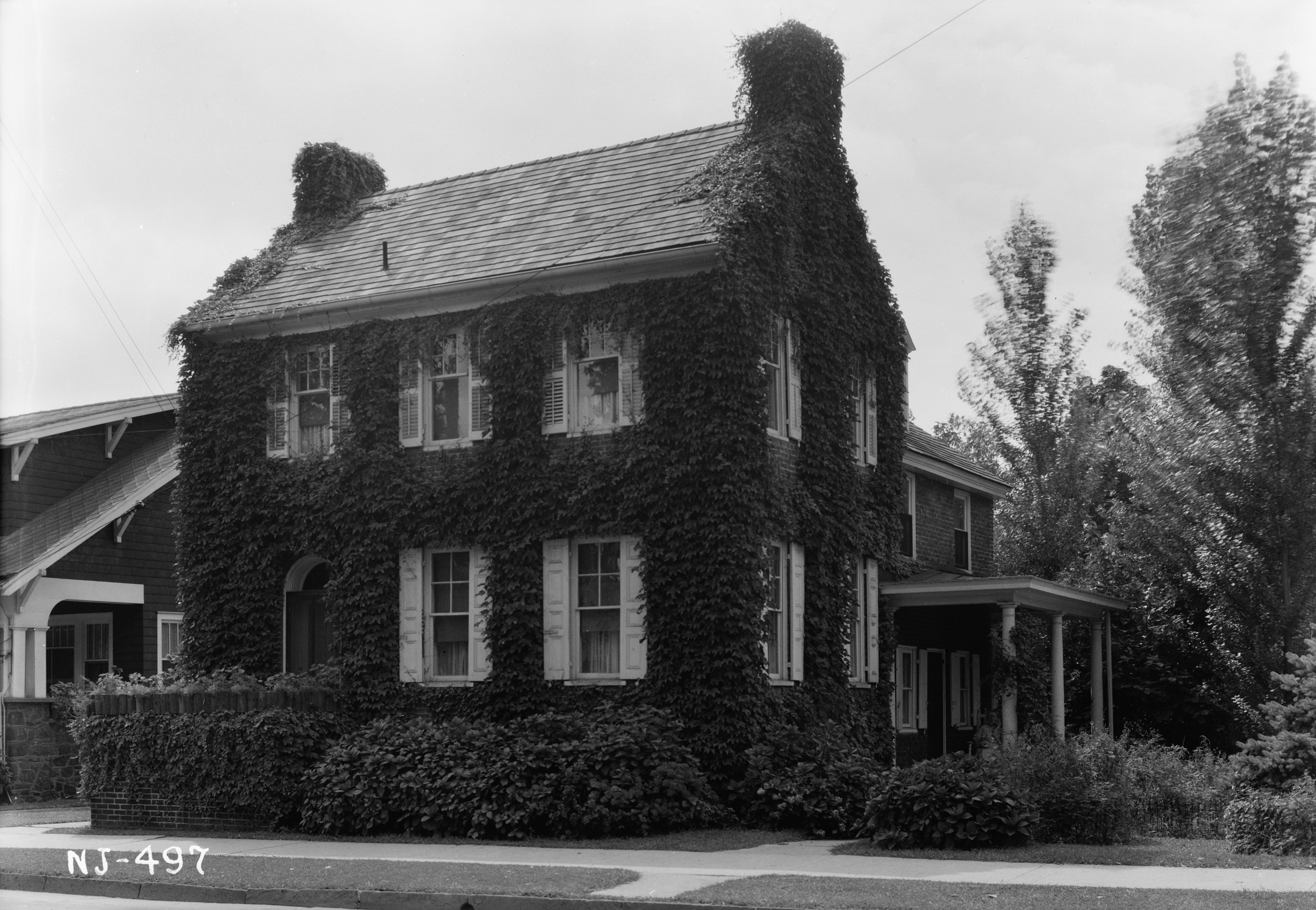
HABS image from 1938

== See also ==
- National Register of Historic Places listings in Cumberland County, New Jersey
