= Ebenezer Elmer =

American politician (1752–1843)

Ebenezer Elmer (August 23, 1752 – October 18, 1843) was an American medical doctor from Bridgeton, New Jersey. He represented New Jersey in the U.S. Congress from the Democratic-Republican Party from 1801 to 1807. Elmer's older brother, Jonathan Elmer, and Ebenezer's son Lucius Elmer were members of the United States House of Representatives.

== Biography ==
Elmer was born in Cedarville, New Jersey, on August 23, 1752. He pursued an academic course, studied medicine and practiced in Cedarville. He served in the Continental Army as ensign, lieutenant, surgeon's mate, and regimental surgeon, and later practiced medicine in Bridgeton from 1783 to 1789. He was a member of the New Jersey General Assembly from 1789 to 1795, serving as speaker in 1791 and 1795.

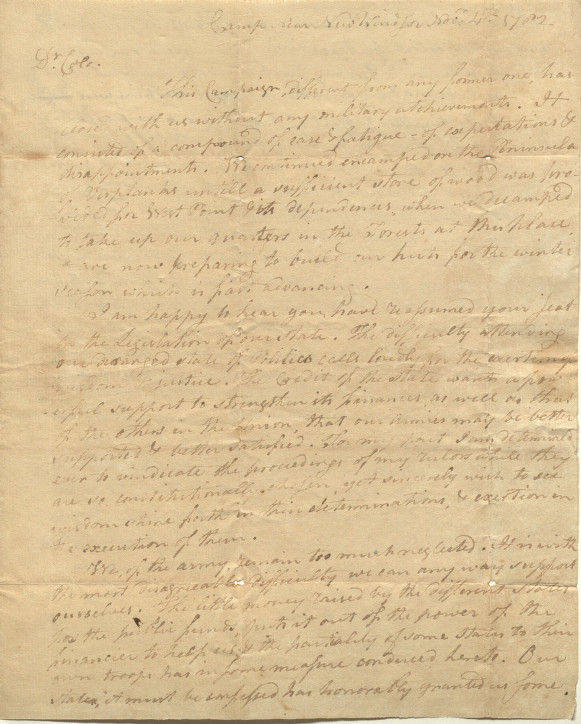
Letter from Ebenezer Elmer, 1782

Following the Revolutionary War, Elmer was admitted as an original member of The Society of the Cincinnati in the State of New Jersey, serving as the New Jersey Society's first Assistant Treasurer. He also served as the President of the New Jersey Society until his death, at which time he was the last surviving original member.

He was elected as a Democratic-Republican to the Seventh, Eighth, and Ninth Congresses, serving in office from March 4, 1801, to March 3, 1807. Not renominated by the Republicans in 1806, the Federalists put up a combined ticket with Dr. Elmer which was unsuccessful.

He was a member of the New Jersey Legislative Council in 1807, and was chosen vice president of that body. He was collector of customs of Bridgeton from 1808 until 1817, when he resigned, was reappointed in 1822 and served until 1832, when he again resigned. He served in the War of 1812, as adjutant general of the New Jersey Militia and brigadier general of the Cumberland brigade. He was vice president of Burlington College from 1808 to 1817 and 1822 to 1832. He retired from public life and died in Bridgeton on October 18, 1843. Elmer was interred in Old Broad Street Presbyterian Church Cemetery in Bridgeton.

U.S. House of Representatives
Preceded by James H. Imlay	Member of the U.S. House of Representatives from New Jersey's at-large congressional district 1801–1807	Succeeded by Thomas Newbold
