= Landis School =

Landis Intermediate School
- 61 West Landis Avenue; Vineland, NJ 08360

Information
- Type: Middle school
- Motto: Lancers Take Charge!
- Established: 1928 (as Vineland High School)
- School district: Vineland Public Schools
- Principal: No principal
- Faculty: 0
- Grades: No longer teaching
- Enrollment: 0
- Colors: Red, Black
- Nickname: Landis
- Website: School website
- Vineland High School
- U.S. National Register of Historic Places
- New Jersey Register of Historic Places
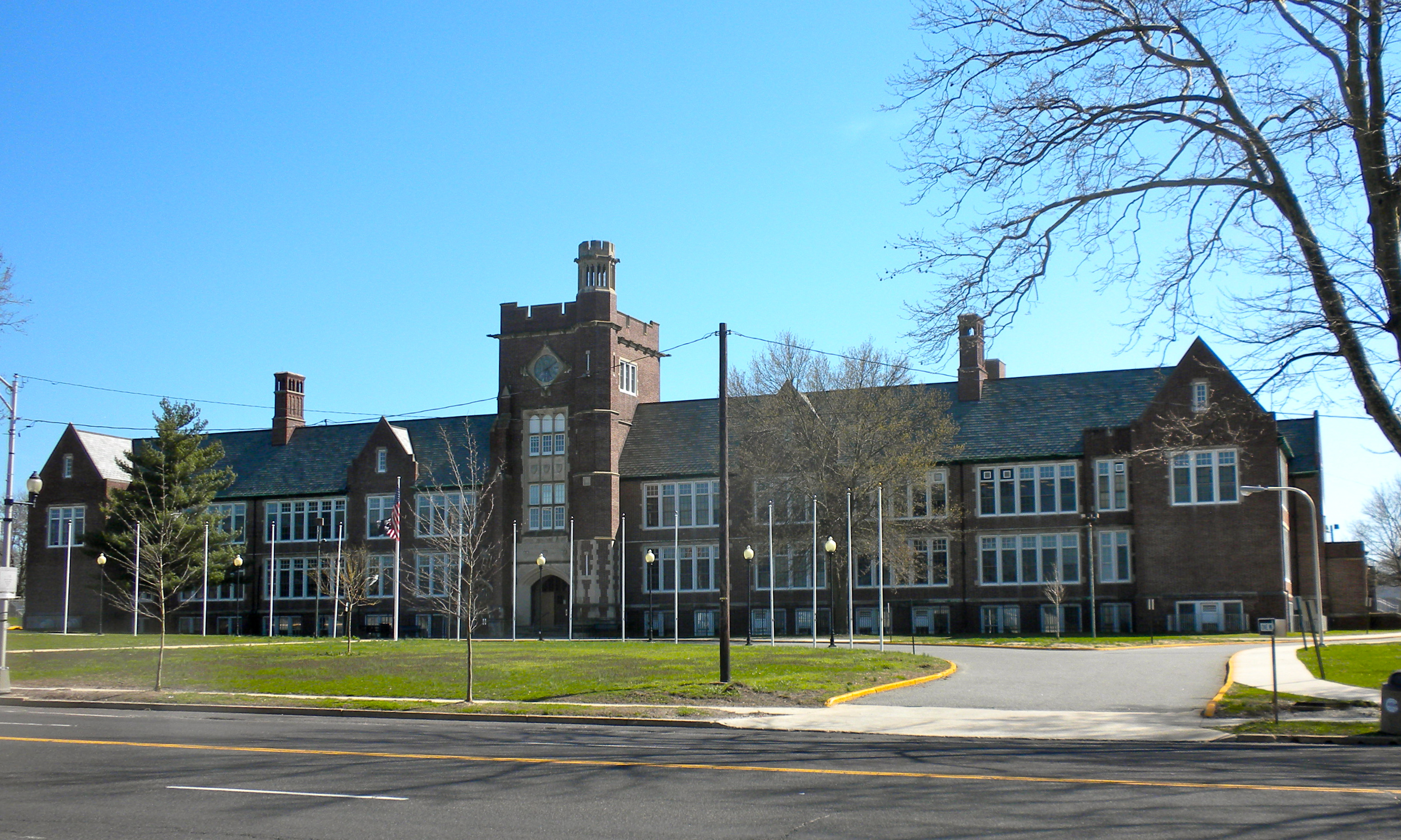

- Location within Cumberland County, New Jersey Location within New Jersey Location within the United States
- Location: 61 West Landis Avenue; Vineland, New Jersey
- Coordinates: 39°29′10″N 75°02′16″W
- Area: 4.4 acres (1.8 ha)
- Built: 1927
- Architect: J.O. Betelle,
- Architectural style: Late Gothic Revival
- NRHP reference No.: 95000181
- NJRHP No.: 2809

Significant dates
- Added to NRHP: March 3, 1995
- Designated NJRHP: January 24, 1995

Landis Intermediate School used to be a public middle school in Vineland, Cumberland County, New Jersey, United States, as part of the Vineland Public Schools. Its last year was 2017-2018. The only grades that were held those years were 7th and 8th. It opened as Vineland High School in 1928 and was designed by James Oscar Betelle. As the population of Vineland grew and Vineland High School got overcrowded, it became necessary to construct a new high school. With the construction of Vineland Senior High School South in 1963 (and the further construction of Vineland Senior High School North in 1976) Vineland High School got degraded to Landis Intermediate School.

As of the 2008-09 school year, the school had an enrollment of 503 students and 48.6 classroom teachers (on an FTE basis), for a student-teacher ratio of 10.3.

Listed as the Vineland High School, it was added to the National Register of Historic Places on March 3, 1995, for its significance in architecture and education.

== Administration ==
Members of the school's administration are:

- Melanie Beck, Principal

== Controversy surrounding Principal Kohaut ==
In March, 2009 Assistant Principal Richard Panas charged that Principal Donald Kohaut had been covering up the number of violent incidents at the school, claiming that at least 80 incidents of violence had not been reported to the state as required by state law. The New Jersey State Department of Education launched a probe into the conditions at the school due to Panas' claims. The probe discovered that while school officials did not properly report the incidents, the failure to do so was due to a lack of communication and was not deliberate. In May, 2009 Kohaut came under fire for physically removing two pages containing the poem Diary Of An Abusive Stepfather from the book Paint Me Like I Am after a student's parent complained. Kohaut answered criticism about his vandalizing the book instead of just removing it by saying that he wanted students to still be able to read the other poems included in the book.

== See also ==
- National Register of Historic Places listings in Cumberland County, New Jersey
