= National Register of Historic Places listings in Cumberland County, New Jersey =

Location of Cumberland County in New Jersey

List of the National Register of Historic Places listings in Cumberland County, New Jersey

Contents: Counties and communities in New Jersey
Atlantic – Bergen (Closter, Franklin Lakes, Ridgewood, Saddle River, Wyckoff) – Burlington – Camden – Cape May – Cumberland – Essex – Gloucester – Hudson – Hunterdon – Mercer – Middlesex – Monmouth – Morris – Ocean – Passaic – Salem – Somerset – Sussex – Union – Warren

This is intended to be a complete list of properties and districts listed on the National Register of Historic Places in Cumberland County, New Jersey. Latitude and longitude coordinates of the sites listed on this page may be displayed in an online map.

This National Park Service list is complete through NPS recent listings posted July 31, 2026.

| | Name on the Register | Image | Date listed | Location | City or town | Description |
|---|---|---|---|---|---|---|
| 1 | A. J. Meerwald | A. J. Meerwald | November 7, 1995 (#95001256) | 22 Miller Avenue on Maurice River; 39°14′05″N 75°01′50″W | Commercial Township | Delaware Bay oyster schooner |
| 2 | Beth Hillel Synagogue | Beth Hillel Synagogue | November 7, 1978 (#78001755) | 547 Irving Ave, Carmel; 39°26′03″N 75°07′31″W | Deerfield Township | |
| 3 | Bethel African Methodist Episcopal Church | Bethel African Methodist Episcopal Church | November 12, 1999 (#99001312) | Sheppards Mill Rd. (Greenwich Township); 39°24′06″N 75°19′48″W | Greenwich Township | |
| 4 | Bivalve Oyster Packing Houses and Docks | Bivalve Oyster Packing Houses and Docks | February 28, 1996 (#96000079) | Shell Rd., Miller and Howard Sts., Commercial Township; 39°14′00″N 75°01′56″W | Commercial Township | |
| 5 | Bridgeton Historic District | Bridgeton Historic District | October 29, 1982 (#82001043) | Roughly bounded by RR Tracks, South Ave., Lake, Commerce, Water, Belmont, Cohensey, and Penn Streets; 39°25′41″N 75°13′57″W | Bridgeton | Includes Jeremiah Buck House, General James Giles House, Old Broad Street Presbyterian Church and Cemetery, Potter's Tavern, and Samuel W. Seeley House |
| 6 | Jeremiah Buck House | Jeremiah Buck House | December 30, 1975 (#75001130) | 297 E. Commerce Street; 39°25′43″N 75°13′36″W | Bridgeton | |
| 7 | Cashier | Cashier | February 23, 2016 (#15001050) | 2800 High Street; 39°14′00″N 75°02′02″W | Commercial Township | Oyster schooner at the Bayshore Center at Bivalve. |
| 8 | Deerfield Pike Tollgate House | Deerfield Pike Tollgate House | May 21, 1975 (#75001131) | 89 Old Deerfield Pike; 39°27′09″N 75°13′45″W | Bridgeton | Demolished in 2001. |
| 9 | Deerfield Presbyterian Church | Deerfield Presbyterian Church | September 29, 1980 (#80002481) | NE of Seabrook; 39°30′42″N 75°14′17″W | Seabrook | |
| 10 | General James Giles House | General James Giles House | March 8, 1978 (#78001754) | 143 W. Broad Street; 39°25′44″N 75°14′33″W | Bridgeton | |
| 11 | Greenwich Historic District | Greenwich Historic District | January 20, 1972 (#72000772) | Main St. from Cohansey River N to Othello; also irregularly bounded by the Cohansey R., Pier Rd., Molly Wheaton and Pine Mount Runs; 39°23′51″N 75°20′25″W | Greenwich | Second set of addresses represent a boundary revision approved August 12, 2024. |
| 12 | Caesar Hoskins Log Cabin | Caesar Hoskins Log Cabin | September 10, 1987 (#87001521) | Jct. of South and Second Sts. 39°17′02″N 74°59′41″W | Mauricetown | |
| 13 | Indian Head Site | Indian Head Site | October 27, 2004 (#04001196) | Address restricted | Deerfield Township | |
| 14 | Landis Theatre–Mori Brothers Building | Landis Theatre–Mori Brothers Building | November 22, 2000 (#00001405) | 830–834 Landis Avenue; 39°29′10″N 75°01′03″W | Vineland | |
| 15 | Thomas Maskel House | Thomas Maskel House | June 10, 1975 (#75001132) | 2 mi (3.2 km). West of Greenwich on Bacon's Neck Road; 39°24′04″N 75°22′34″W | Greenwich Township | |
| 16 | Maurice River Lighthouse and East Point Archeological District | Maurice River Lighthouse and East Point Archeological District | August 25, 1995 (#95001047) | Lighthouse Road, near the junction of East Point Road; 39°11′45″N 75°01′40″W | Maurice River Township | |
| 17 | Mauricetown Historic District | Mauricetown Historic District | March 29, 2018 (#100002252) | Roughly along Highland Street; 39°17′10″N 74°59′43″W | Mauricetown | Includes Caesar Hoskins Log Cabin |
| 18 | Miah Maull Shoal Lighthouse | Miah Maull Shoal Lighthouse | February 4, 1991 (#90002188) | In Delaware Bay 5 mi (8.0 km). SW of Egg Island Point; 39°07′36″N 75°12′35″W | Downe Township | |
| 19 | Millville's First Bank Building | Millville's First Bank Building | November 20, 1980 (#80002480) | 2nd and E. Main Sts. 39°23′43″N 75°02′14″W | Millville | |
| 20 | Old Broad Street Presbyterian Church and Cemetery | Old Broad Street Presbyterian Church and Cemetery | December 2, 1974 (#74001159) | Broad and Lawrence Streets; 39°25′44″N 75°14′46″W | Bridgeton | |
| 21 | Old Stone Church | Old Stone Church | May 12, 1977 (#77000860) | N of Cedarville on NJ 553; 39°21′37″N 75°13′30″W | Fairfield Township | Early Fairfield Presbyterian Church building |
| 22 | Potter's Tavern | Potter's Tavern | September 10, 1971 (#71000501) | 49-51 Broad St. 39°25′40″N 75°14′20″W | Bridgeton | |
| 23 | John and Elizabeth Remington House | John and Elizabeth Remington House | July 14, 2015 (#15000420) | 689 Roadstown Road; 39°26′24″N 75°18′41″W | Hopewell Township | |
| 24 | Samuel W. Seeley House | Samuel W. Seeley House | May 13, 1976 (#76001150) | 274 E. Commerce Street; 39°25′41″N 75°13′37″W | Bridgeton | |
| 25 | Ship John Shoal Light Station | Ship John Shoal Light Station | July 19, 2006 (#06000630) | In Delaware Bay, 3.3 mi (5.3 km). W-SW of Sea Breeze; 39°18′26″N 75°22′36″W | Sea Breeze | |
| 26 | Siloam Cemetery | Siloam Cemetery | April 3, 2020 (#100005155) | 550 North Valley Avenue; 39°29′22″N 75°00′24″W | Vineland | |
| 26 | Spindrift Sailing Yacht | | April 22, 1982 (#82003271) | S. of Bridgeton; 39°22′48″N 75°13′24″W | Bridgeton | Boat is no longer at this location. |
| 27 | Trinity African Methodist Episcopal Church | Trinity African Methodist Episcopal Church | September 29, 1995 (#95001138) | Bridgeton-Milltown Rd. (NJ 49), E of Woodruff Rd. (Co. Rd. 553), Fairfield Twp. 39°25′12″N 75°11′03″W | Fairfield Township | |
| 28 | Vineland High School | Vineland High School | March 3, 1995 (#95000181) | 61 W. Landis Ave. 39°29′10″N 75°02′17″W | Vineland | Now the Landis School. |
| 29 | Wood Mansion House | Wood Mansion House | December 24, 2013 (#13000975) | 821 Columbia Avenue; 39°24′10″N 75°02′42″W | Millville | |

== Former listing ==
| | Name on the Register | Image | Date listed | Date removed | Location | City or town | Description |
|---|---|---|---|---|---|---|---|
| 1 | Levoy Theatre | Levoy Theatre | August 14, 1998 (#98001064) | July 17, 2013 | 126-130 N. High St. 39°23′49″N 75°02′18″W | Millville City | 22,000-square-foot (2,000 m^{2}) theater built in 1908. Collapsed January 3, 2011 |

== See also ==
- National Register of Historic Places listings in New Jersey
- List of National Historic Landmarks in New Jersey
