= Lucius Elmer =

American judge

Lucius Quintius Cincinnatus Elmer
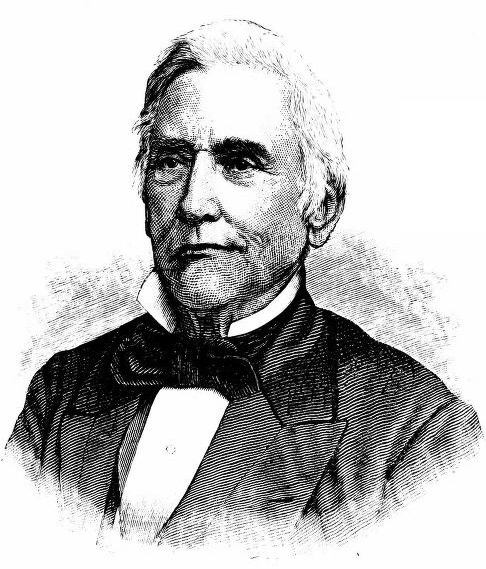
- From 1883's History of the Counties of Gloucester, Salem, and Cumberland, New Jersey

Member of the U.S. House of Representatives from New Jersey's 1st district
- In office March 4, 1843 – March 3, 1845
- Preceded by: John Bancker Aycrigg; William Halstead; John Patterson Bryan Maxwell; Joseph Fitz Randolph; Charles C. Stratton; Thomas J. Yorke (Elected statewide on a Whig Party general ticket)
- Succeeded by: James G. Hampton (W)

United States Attorney for the District of New Jersey
- In office 1824–1829
- President: James Monroe; John Quincy Adams
- Preceded by: Joseph McIlvaine
- Succeeded by: Garret D. Wall

Personal details
- Born: February 3, 1793 Bridgeton, New Jersey, US
- Died: March 11, 1883 (aged 90) Bridgeton, New Jersey, US
- Party: Democratic
- Spouse: Catharine Hay (m. 1818)
- Profession: Politician

Lucius Quintius Cincinnatus Elmer (February 3, 1793 – March 11, 1883) was an American Democratic Party politician who represented New Jersey's 1st congressional district in the U.S. Congress from 1843 to 1845. He was son of Ebenezer Elmer and nephew of Jonathan Elmer, both of whom also served in Congress.

== Biography ==
Elmer was born in Bridgeton, New Jersey on February 3, 1793. He attended the private schools and graduated from the University of Pennsylvania. During the War of 1812, he served in the militia as a lieutenant of artillery, and was promoted to the rank of brigade major and inspector. He studied law, was admitted to the bar in 1815 and commenced practice in Bridgeton. He was prosecuting attorney for the State in 1824. He was a member of the New Jersey General Assembly from 1820 to 1823, serving the last year as speaker. He was prosecutor of the pleas for Cumberland County in 1824 and U.S. Attorney for the District of New Jersey from 1824 to 1829.

Elmer was elected in 1843 as a Democrat to the Twenty-eighth Congress in a district which comprises Atlantic, Cape May, Cumberland, Gloucester and Salem Counties (Camden County was created out of Gloucester in 1844), serving in office from March 4, 1843 – March 3, 1845, where he served as chairman of the Committee on Elections. He was an unsuccessful for reelection in 1844 to the Twenty-ninth Congress. As a lame-duck Congressman, Elmer was the lone New Jersey Democratic vote against the annexation of Texas in January 1845.

After leaving Congress, he served as New Jersey Attorney General of New Jersey from 1850 to 1852, and was an associate justice of the New Jersey Supreme Court from 1852 to 1859 and again from 1861 until 1869 when he retired. He died in Bridgeton on March 11, 1883, and was interred in Old Broad Street Presbyterian Church Cemetery in Bridgeton.

Elmer married Catharine Hay on October 6, 1818 in Philadelphia. She was born in Philadelphia in 1794, the daughter of Daniel Hay and Catharine Ferrier. She died on October 27, 1884 in Bridgeton, New Jersey at age 90, and was interred on October 30, 1884 in Old Broad Street Presbyterian Church Cemetery.

== Legacy ==
The Borough of Elmer in Salem County, New Jersey was named in his honor. Elmer helped obtain a post office for the community during his service as Congressman.

U.S. House of Representatives
Preceded by At-large	Member of the U.S. House of Representatives from New Jersey's 1st congressional district March 4, 1843–March 3, 1845	Succeeded by James G. Hampton
