= Old Broad Street Presbyterian Church and Cemetery =

Historic church in New Jersey, United States

- U.S. National Register of Historic Places
- U.S. Historic district – Contributing property
- New Jersey Register of Historic Places
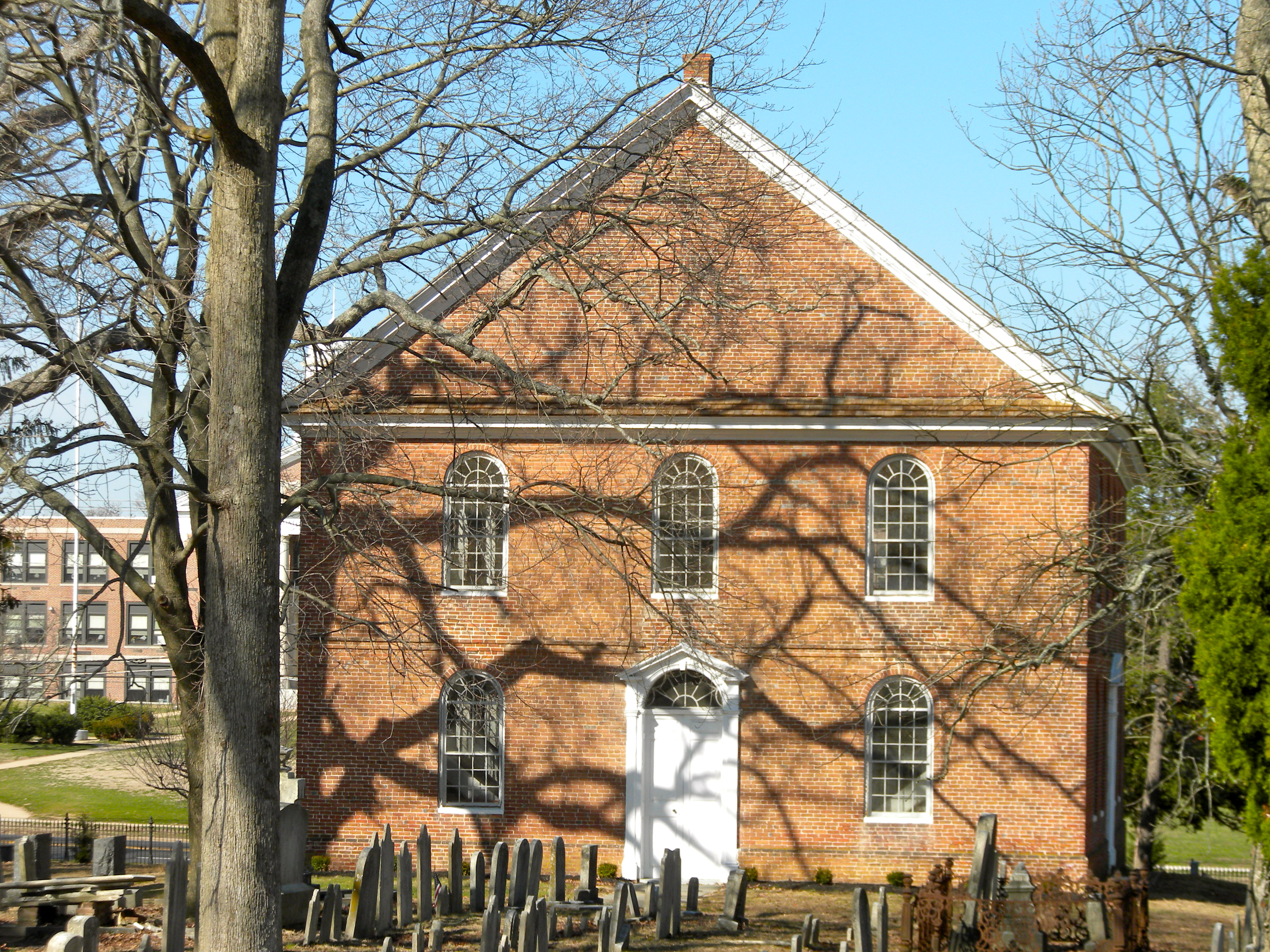

- Location within Cumberland County, New Jersey Location within New Jersey Location within the United States
- Location: Broad and Lawrence Streets, Bridgeton, New Jersey
- Coordinates: 39°25′45″N 75°14′43″W
- Area: 9.8 acres (4.0 ha)
- Built: 1792
- Architectural style: Federal
- Part of: Bridgeton Historic District (Bridgeton, New Jersey) (ID82001043)
- NRHP reference No.: 74001159
- NJRHP No.: 1029

Significant dates
- Added to NRHP: December 2, 1974
- Designated CP: October 29, 1982
- Designated NJRHP: December 27, 1973

The Old Broad Street Presbyterian Church and Cemetery is a historic place on Broad (New Jersey Route 49) and Lawrence Streets in the city of Bridgeton in Cumberland County, New Jersey, United States. The brick church was built in 1792 and was documented by the Historic American Buildings Survey (HABS) in 1936. It was added to the National Register of Historic Places on December 2, 1974, for its significance in architecture. It was added as a contributing property to the Bridgeton Historic District on October 29, 1982.

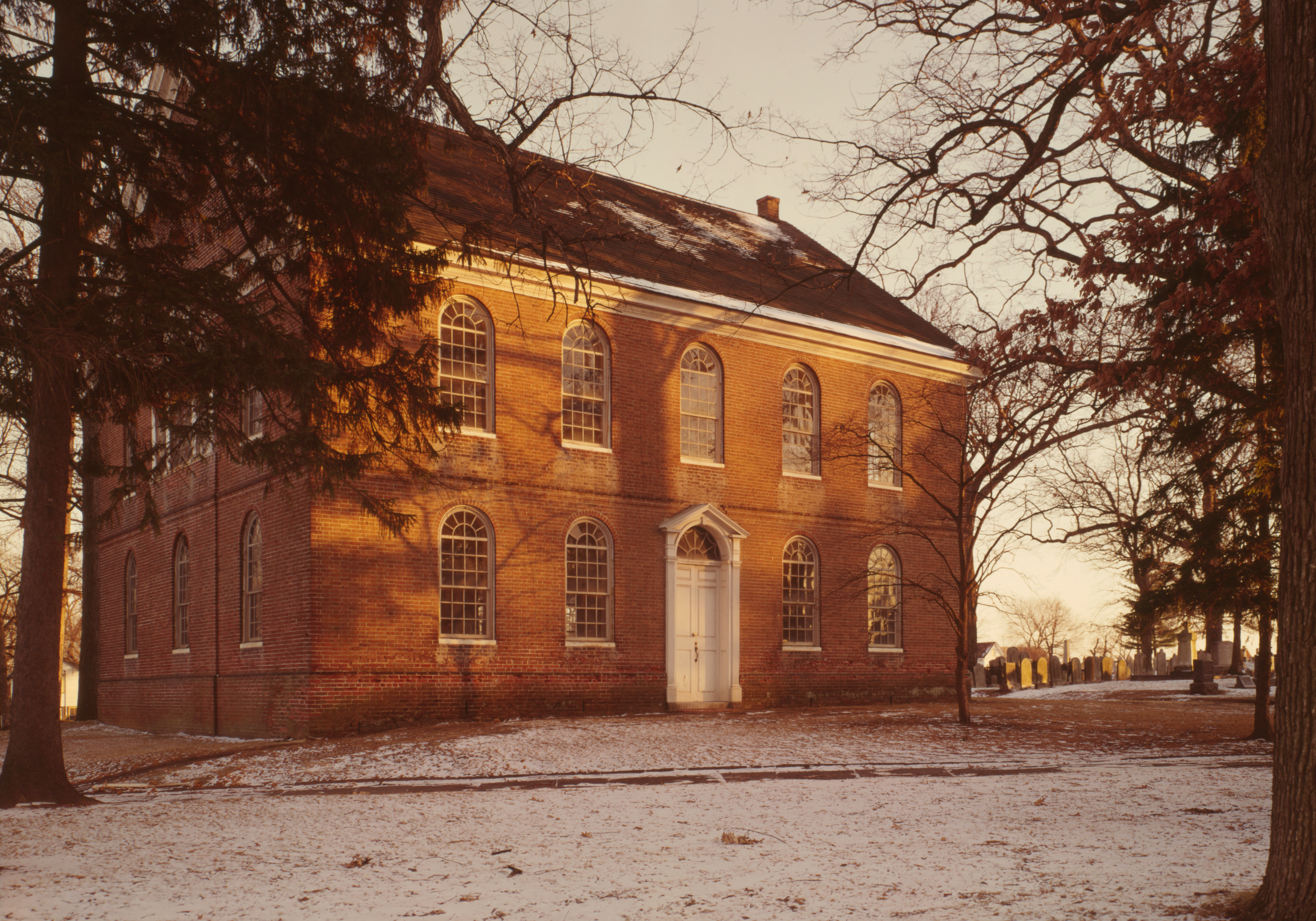
HABS photo from 1936

== Notable burials ==
- Ebenezer Elmer (1752–1843), represented New Jersey in the United States House of Representatives from 1801 to 1807.
- Jonathan Elmer (1745–1817), represented New Jersey in the United States Senate from 1789 to 1791.
- Lucius Elmer (1793–1883), represented New Jersey's 1st congressional district from 1843 to 1845.
- James G. Hampton (1814–1861), represented New Jersey's 1st congressional district in the United States House of Representatives from 1845 to 1849.
- John T. Nixon (1820–1889), represented New Jersey's 1st congressional district from 1859 to 1863.
- Elias P. Seeley (1791–1846), 11th Governor of New Jersey, serving in 1833.
- William G. Whiteley (1819–1886), represented Delaware in the United States House of Representatives from 1857 to 1861.
- General James Giles (1759–1825) American Revolutionary War officer, served under the Marquis de Lafayette.
- Bloomfield H. Minch (1864–1929), President of the New Jersey Senate
- Joseph Archibald Clark (1822–1914), one of the founders of Cumberland Glass Mfg. Co.
- Clement Waters Shoemaker (1848–1914), one of the founders of Cumberland Glass Mfg. Co. and philanthropist.
- Thomas Whitaker Trenchard (1863–1942), Justice of the New Jersey Supreme Court from 1906 to 1941.
- Hessian soldier from the American Revolutionary War
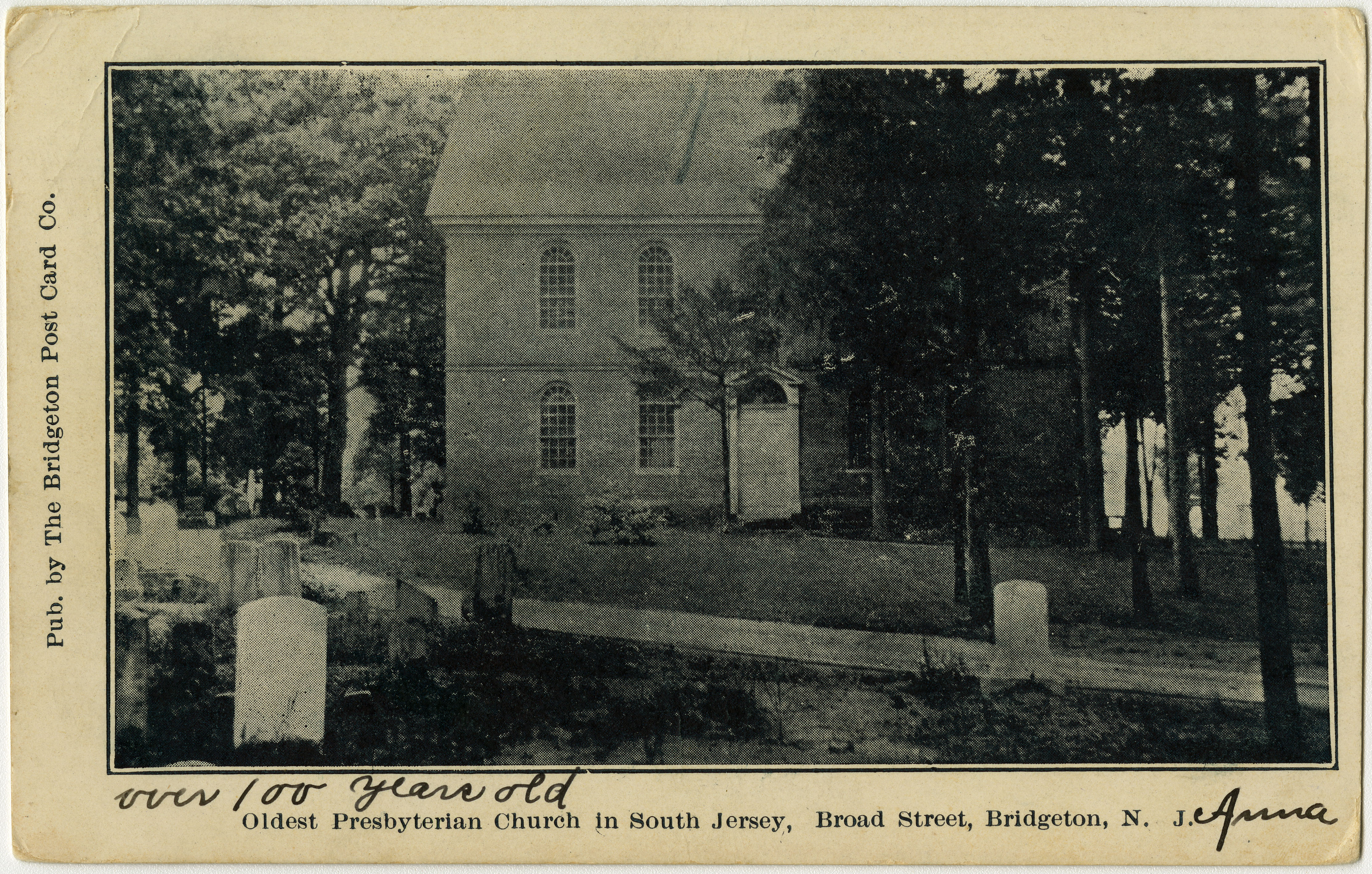
On a pre-1923 postcard

== See also ==
- Fairfield Presbyterian Church
- National Register of Historic Places listings in Cumberland County, New Jersey
