= Bridgeton Historic District (Bridgeton, New Jersey) =

Historic district in New Jersey, United States

- U.S. National Register of Historic Places
- U.S. Historic district
- New Jersey Register of Historic Places
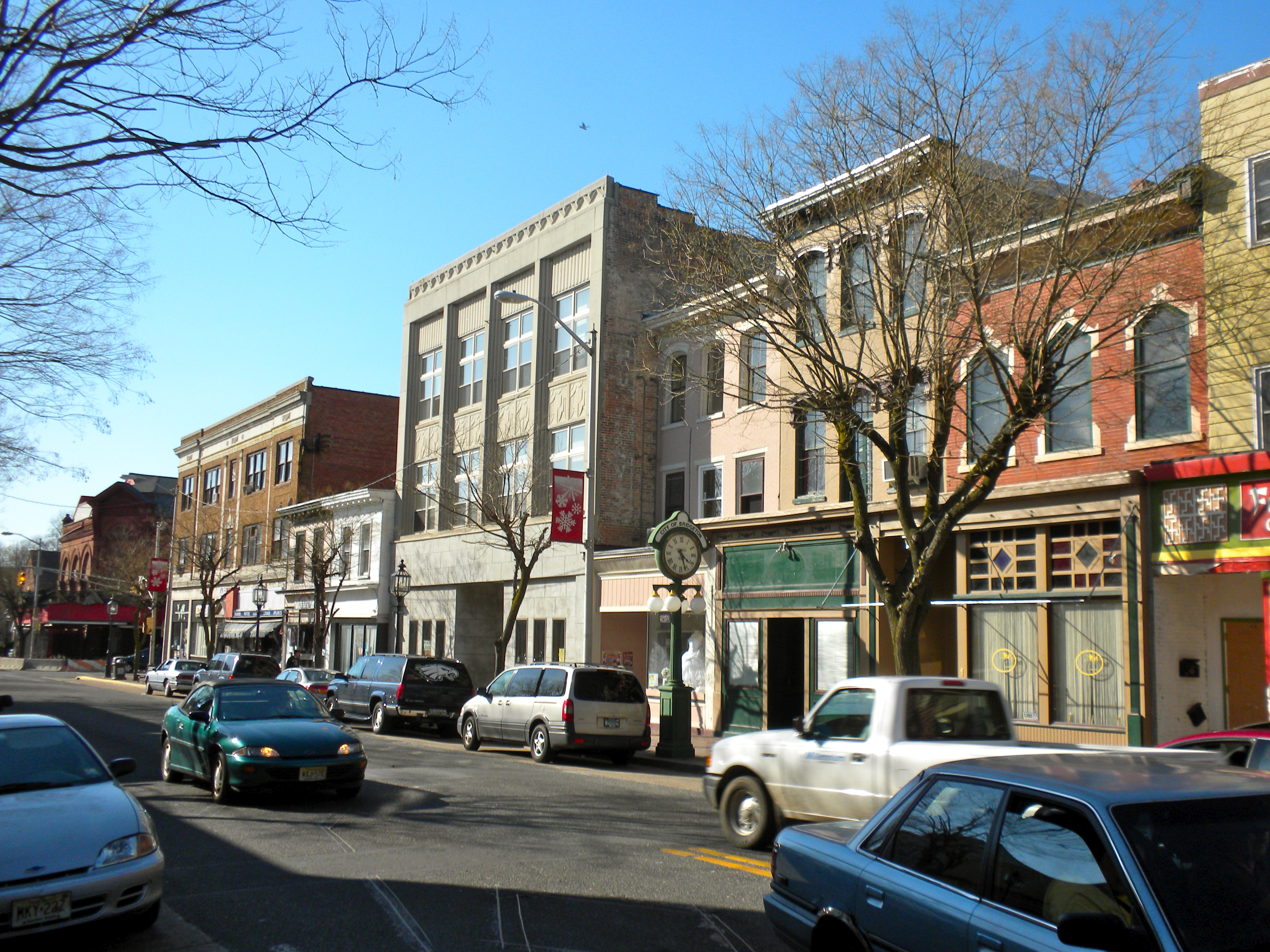
- Downtown Bridgeton along Commerce Street

- Location within Cumberland County, New Jersey Location within New Jersey Location within the United States
- Location: Roughly bounded by RR Tracks, South Avenue, Lake, Commerce, Water, Belmont, Cohensey, and Penn Streets, Bridgeton, New Jersey
- Coordinates: 39°25′41″N 75°13′57″W
- Area: 616 acres (249 ha)
- Architectural style: Late Victorian
- NRHP reference No.: 82001043
- NJRHP No.: 1020

Significant dates
- Added to NRHP: October 29, 1982
- Designated NJRHP: February 22, 1982

The Bridgeton Historic District is a 616-acre (249 ha) historic district in the city of Bridgeton in Cumberland County, New Jersey, United States. The district was added to the National Register of Historic Places on October 29, 1982, for its significance in architecture, commerce, industry, and transportation. The district includes about 2,000 contributing buildings. Several individually NRHP-listed properties are located in the district: Jeremiah Buck House, General James Giles House, Old Broad Street Presbyterian Church and Cemetery, Potter's Tavern, and Samuel W. Seeley House. The Cumberland County Courthouse also contributes to the district.

== History and description ==
Bridgeton started as two villages, one on each side of the Cohansey River, connected by a bridge. According to the nomination form, the city is "unique geographically, architecturally, and socially." The Jeremiah Buck House and Samuel W. Seeley House are in the Mill Town section of the city, near East Lake. The General James Giles House, Old Broad Street Presbyterian Church, and Potter's Tavern are in the West Broad Street neighborhood.

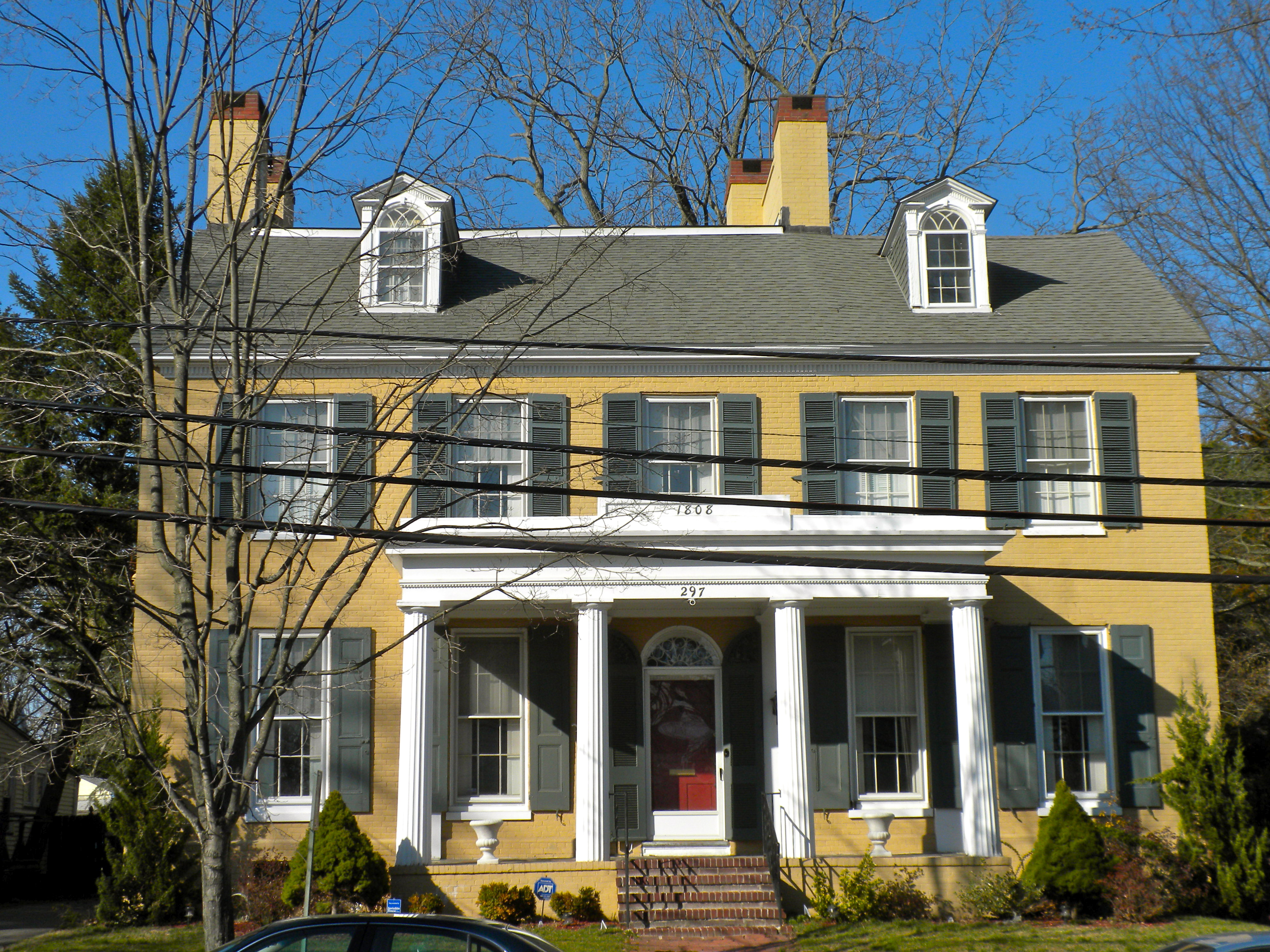
Jeremiah Buck House

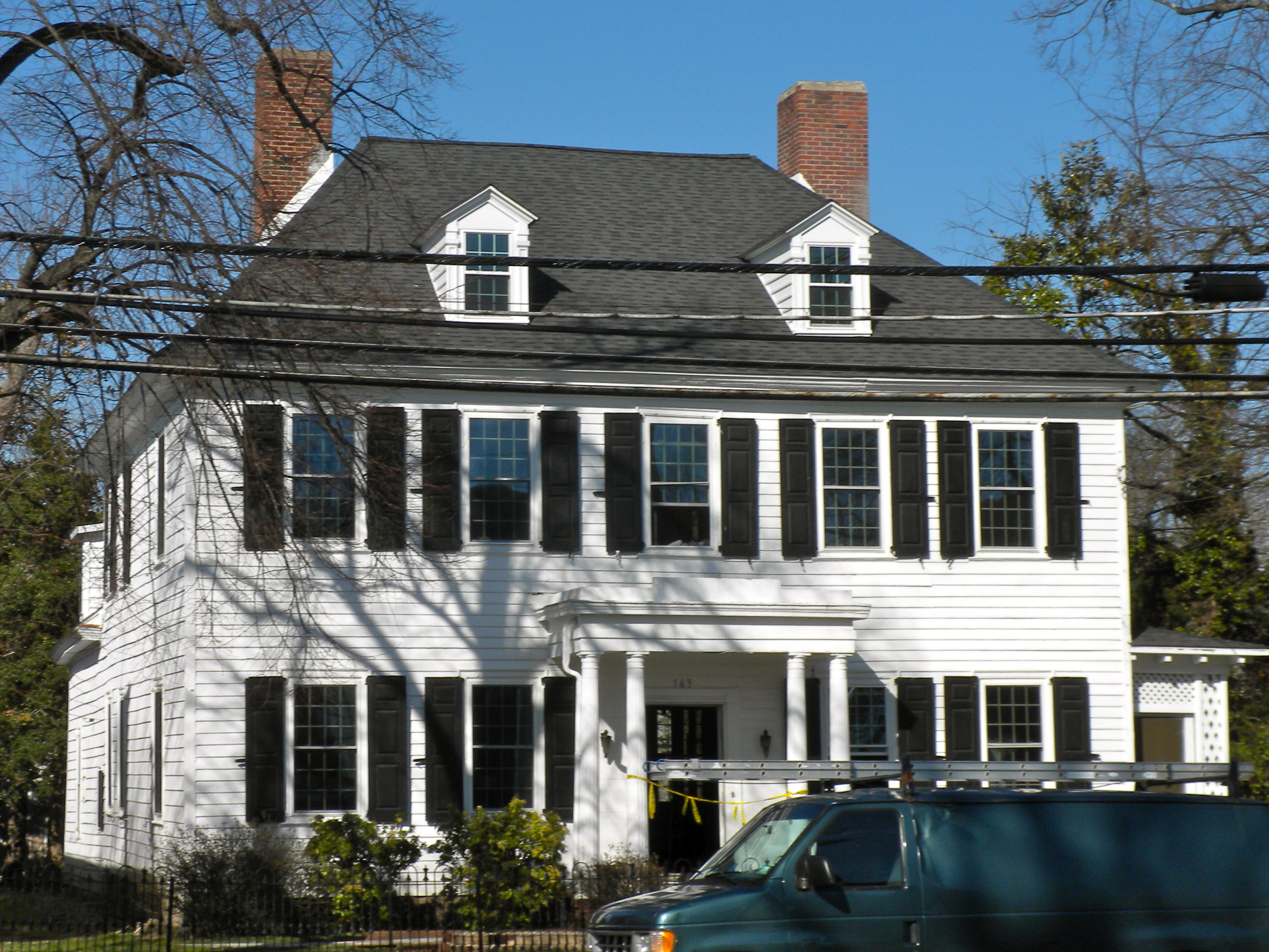
General James Giles House

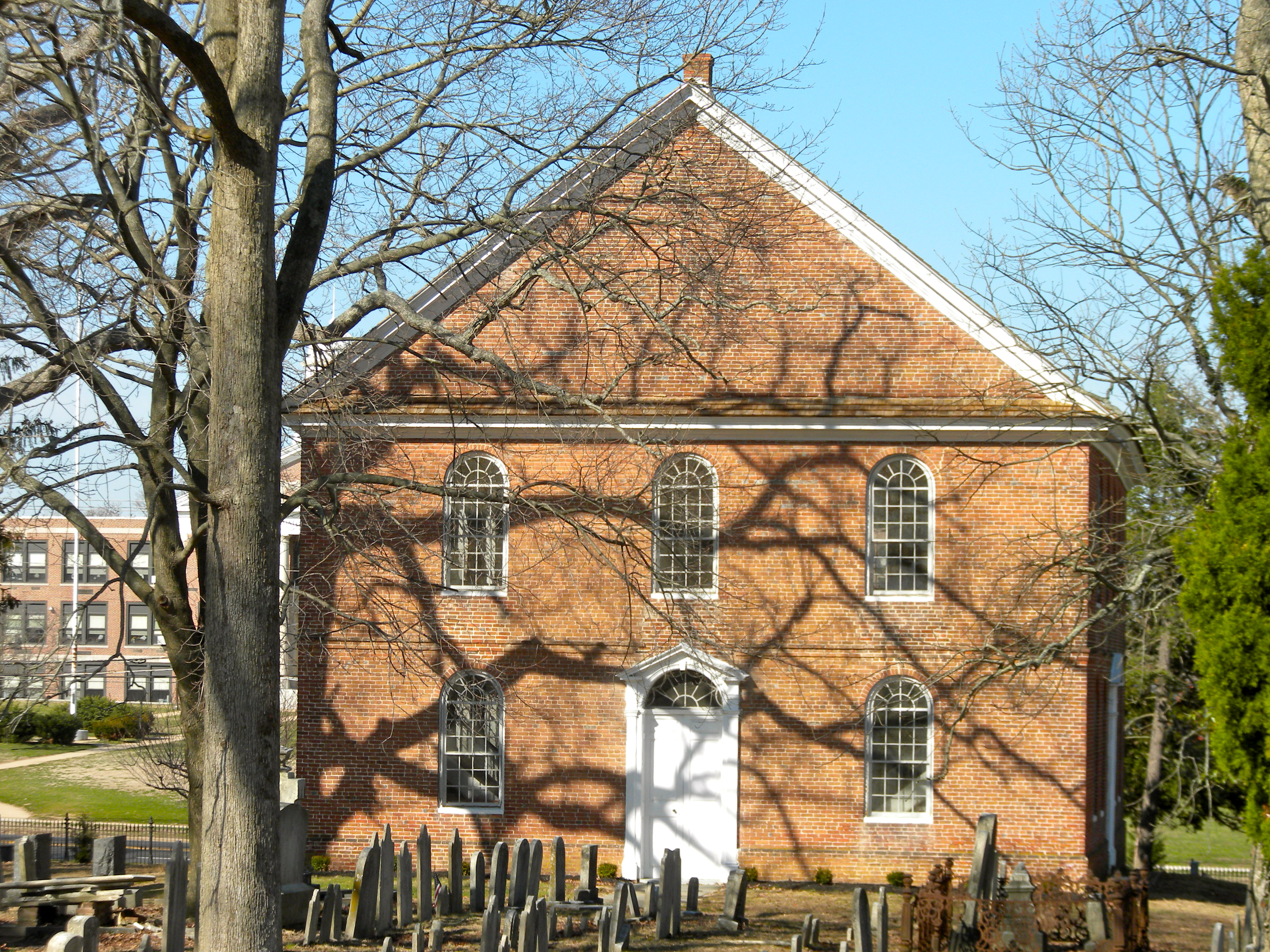
Old Broad Street Presbyterian Church and Cemetery

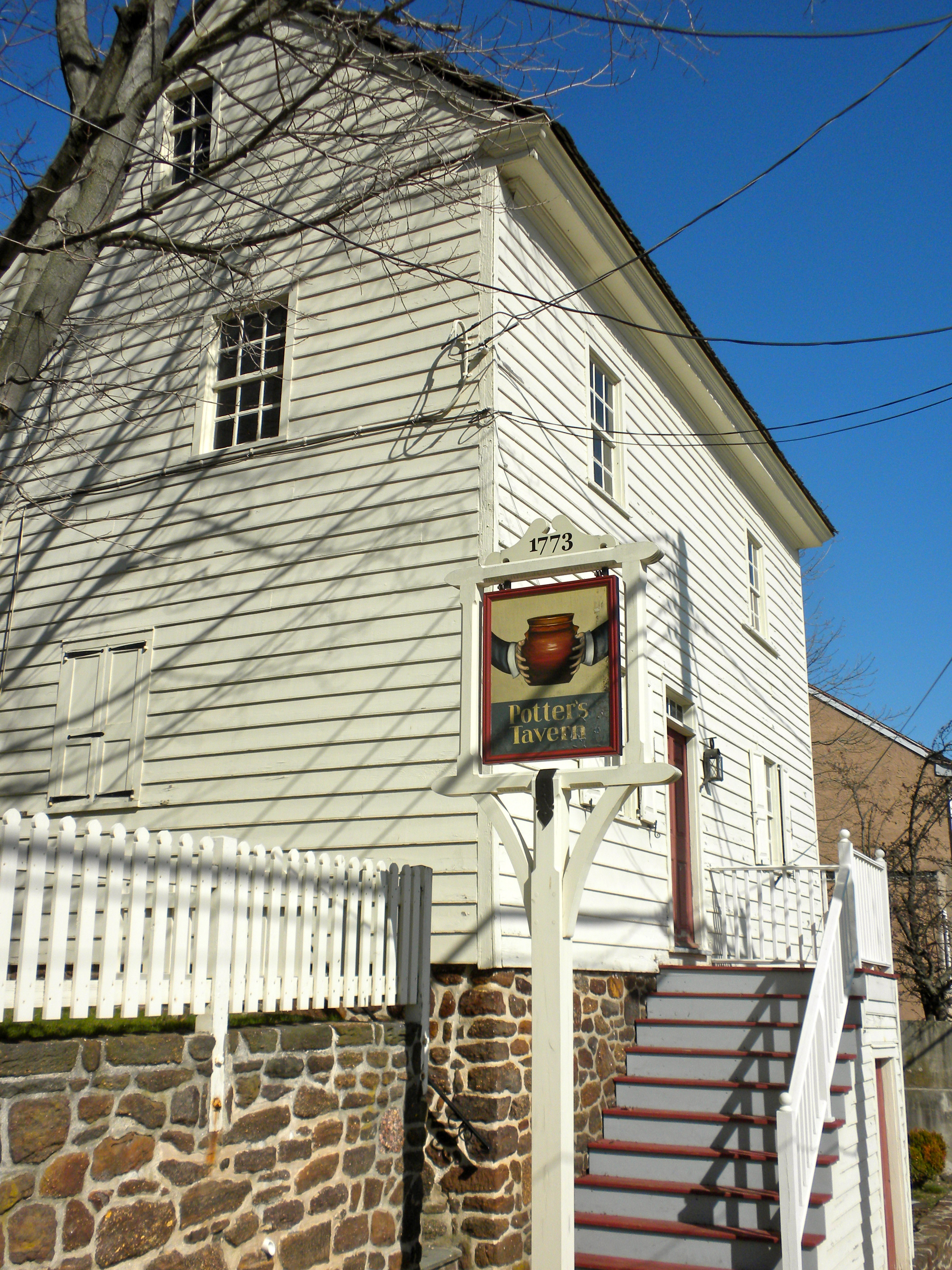
Potter's Tavern

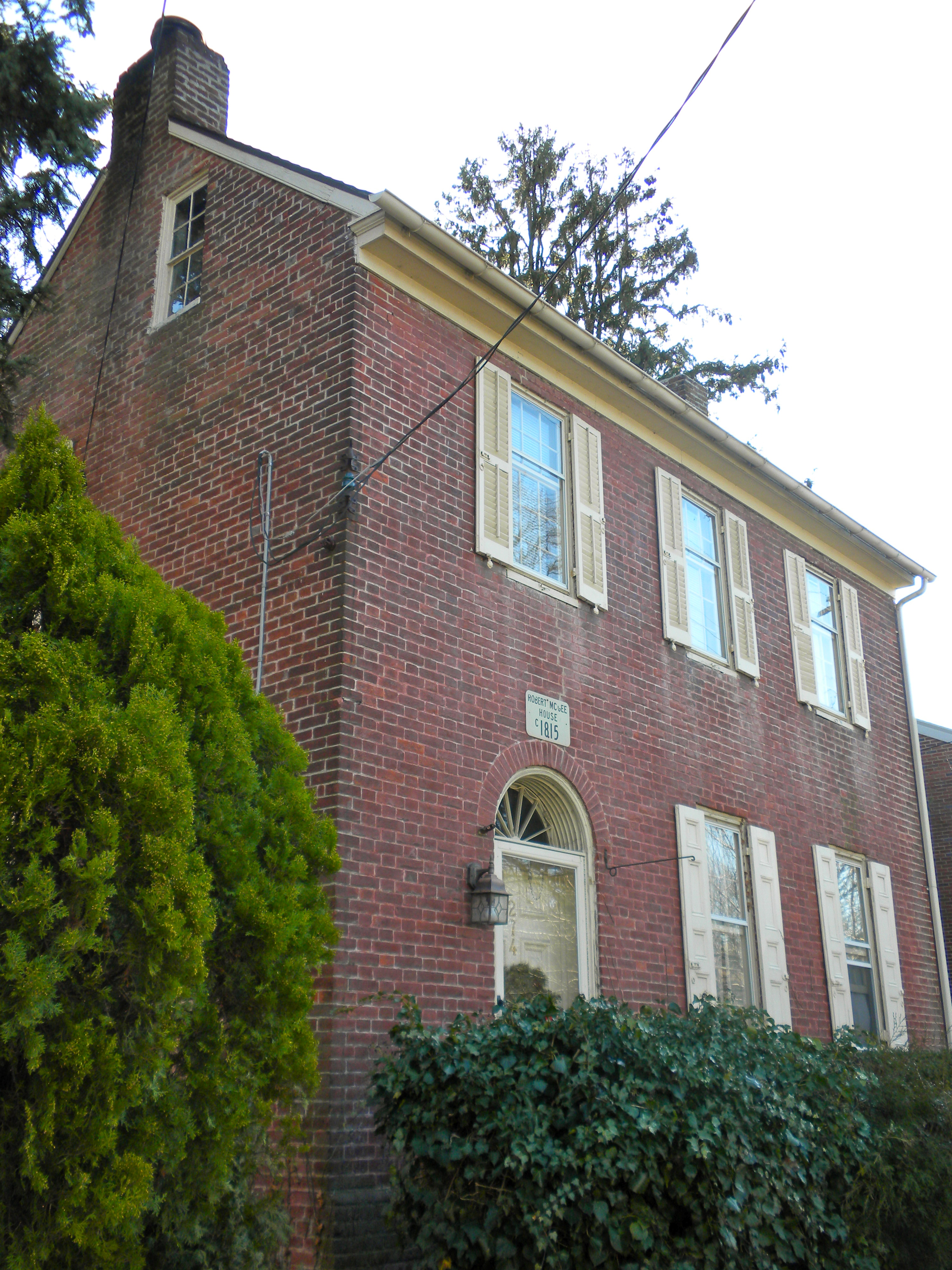
Samuel W. Seeley House

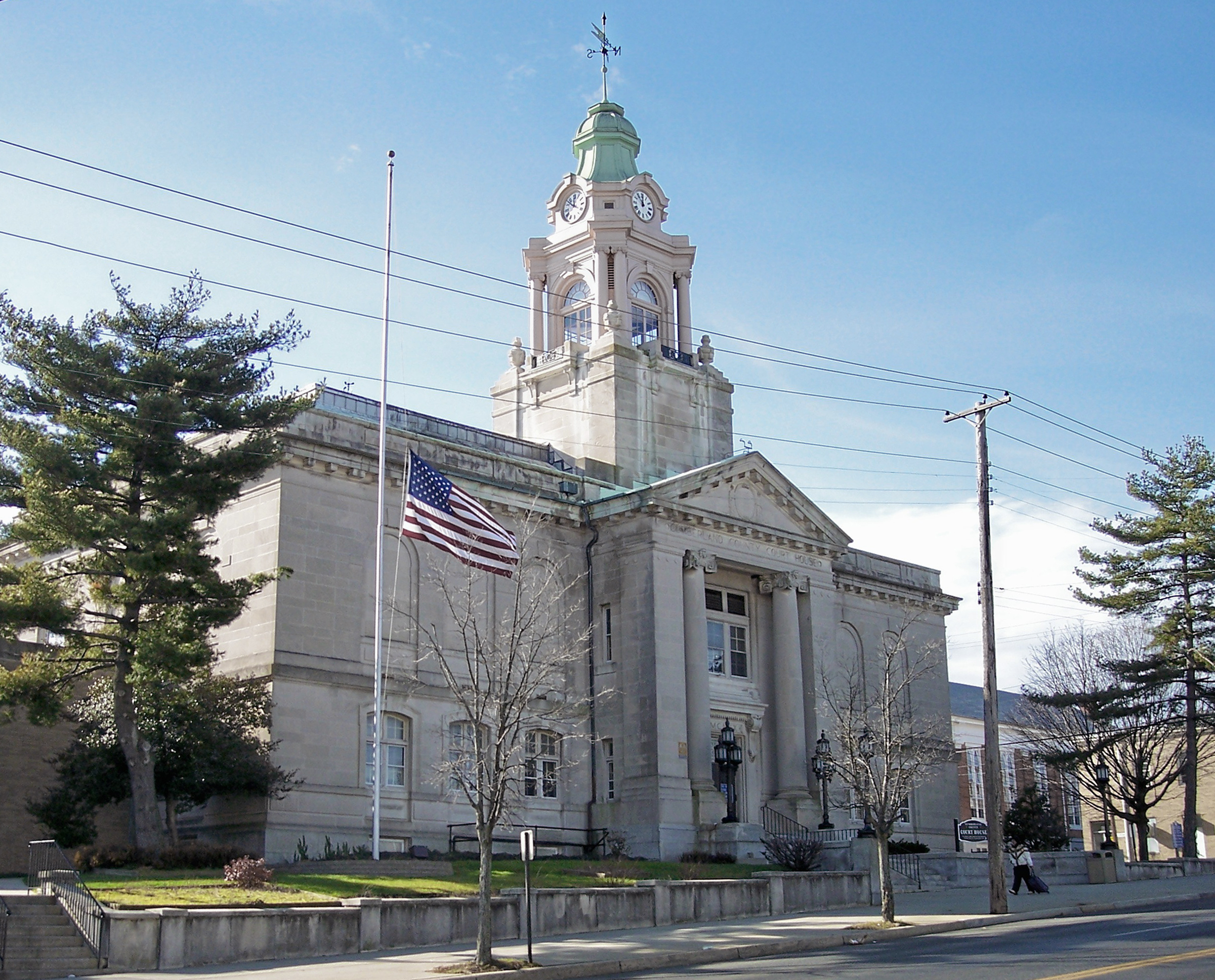
Cumberland County Courthouse

== See also ==
- National Register of Historic Places listings in Cumberland County, New Jersey
