= Gen. James Giles House =

Historic house in New Jersey, United States

- General James Giles House
- U.S. National Register of Historic Places
- U.S. Historic district – Contributing property
- New Jersey Register of Historic Places
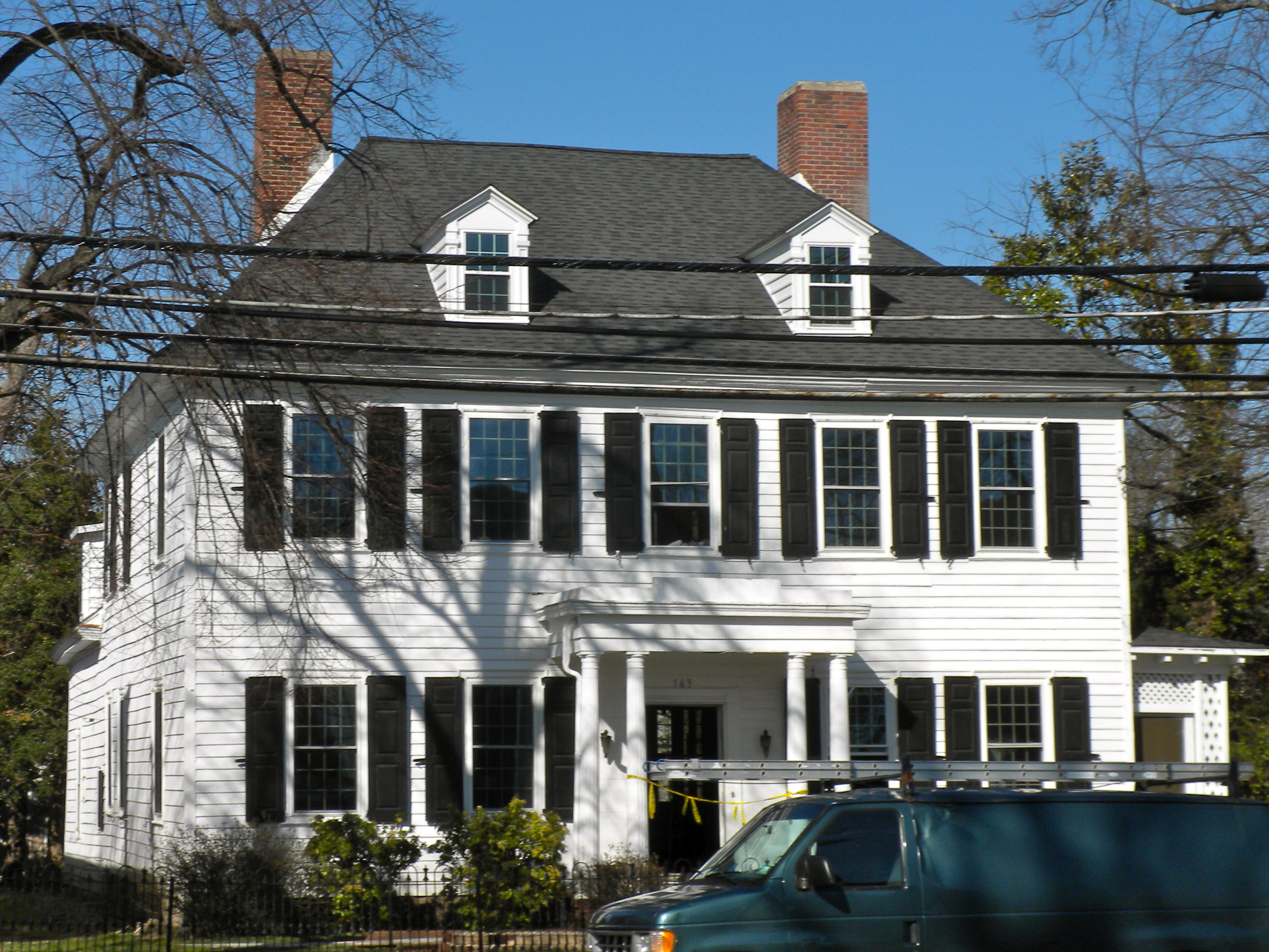

- Location within Cumberland County, New Jersey Location within New Jersey Location within the United States
- Location: 143 West Broad Street, Bridgeton, New Jersey
- Coordinates: 39°25′44″N 75°14′33″W
- Built: 1791
- Architectural style: Georgian
- Part of: Bridgeton Historic District (Bridgeton, New Jersey) (ID82001043)
- NRHP reference No.: 78001754
- NJRHP No.: 1024

Significant dates
- Added to NRHP: March 8, 1978
- Designated CP: October 29, 1982
- Designated NJRHP: December 19, 1977

The General James Giles House is located at 143 West Broad Street in the city of Bridgeton in Cumberland County, New Jersey, United States. The house was built in 1791 and was documented by the Historic American Buildings Survey (HABS) in 1936. It was added to the National Register of Historic Places on March 8, 1978, for its significance in architecture, law, and military history. It was later added as a contributing property to the Bridgeton Historic District on October 29, 1982.

== History and description ==
According to the nomination form, the house is "one of the most distinct examples of Georgian Architecture that can be found in the state". The two and one-half story frame house was built in 1791 for General James Giles, an officer in the American Revolutionary War. He later studied law with Joseph Bloomfield. Gates moved to Bridgeton in 1788, where he established his law practice. In 1884, the house was owned by William E. Potter. In 1977, it was owned by Dr. James Maurice Gates.

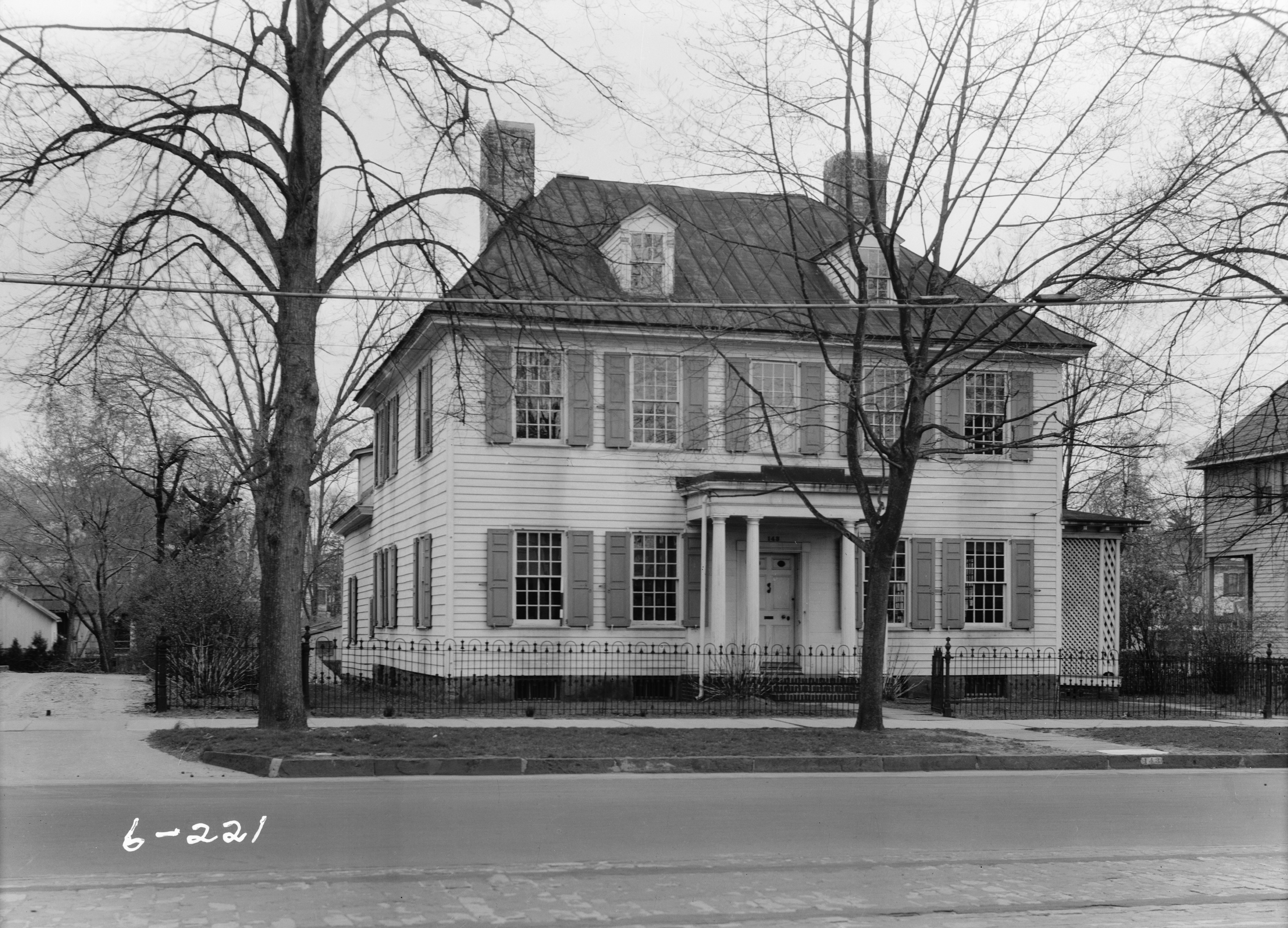
HABS photo from 1936

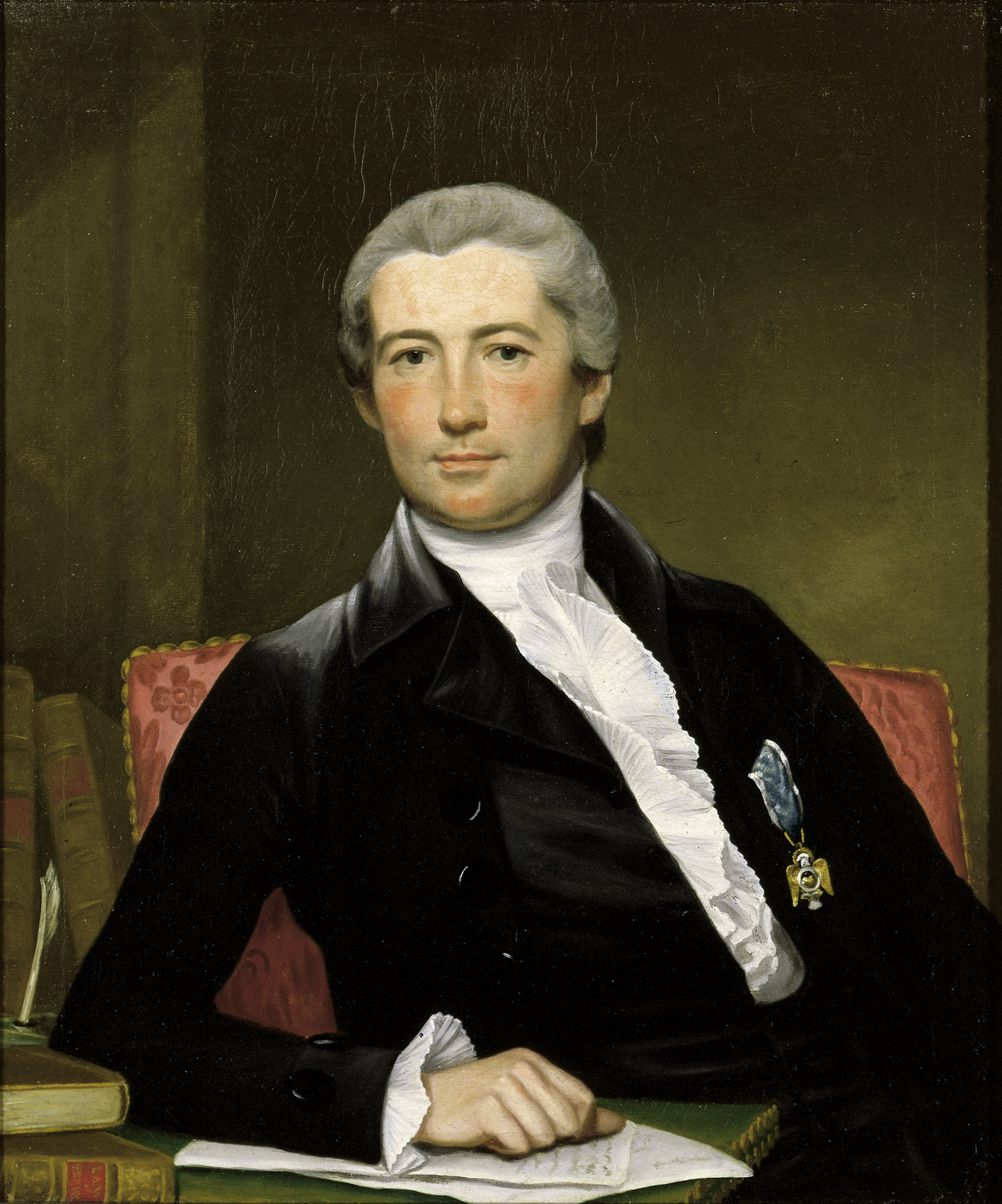
Portrait of General James Giles by Joseph Wright

== See also ==
- National Register of Historic Places listings in Cumberland County, New Jersey
