= Thomas Maskel House =

Historic house in New Jersey, United States

- U.S. National Register of Historic Places
- New Jersey Register of Historic Places
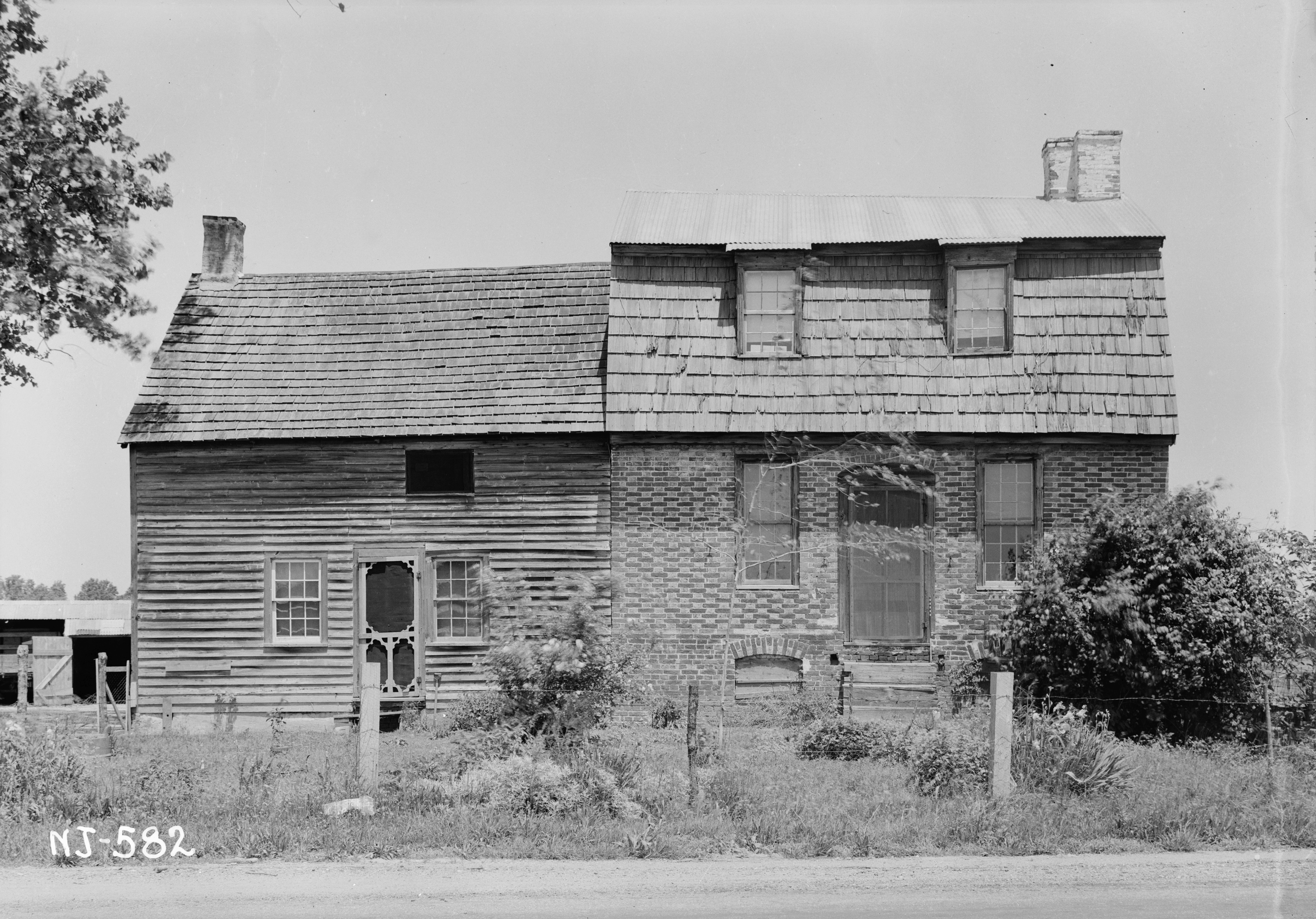
- Thomas Maskel House, HABS photo from 1939

- Location within Cumberland County, New Jersey Location within New Jersey Location within the United States
- Location: Bacon's Neck Road, Greenwich Township, New Jersey
- Coordinates: 39°24′12.5″N 75°21′56″W
- Built: 1698, 1725
- NRHP reference No.: 75001132
- NJRHP No.: 1045

Significant dates
- Added to NRHP: June 10, 1975
- Designated NJRHP: June 15, 1973

The Thomas Maskel House is located on Bacon's Neck Road near the Greenwich section of Greenwich Township in Cumberland County, New Jersey, United States. The building was documented by the Historic American Buildings Survey (HABS) in 1939. It was added to the National Register of Historic Places on June 10, 1975, for its significance in exploration/settlement.

== History and description ==
The building has two sections. The older section is a two-story wood frame house built in 1698. The newer section is a two-story brick addition built in 1725 featuring glazed Flemish bond brickwork. The property was purchased by Thomas Maskell from Edward Shaw in 1703. Two of his descendants, James and Thomas Ewing, participated in the Greenwich Tea Party. The house remained in the family until 1800 when it was sold to Jonathon Doan. The farm was later known as Vauxhall Gardens.

== See also ==
- National Register of Historic Places listings in Cumberland County, New Jersey
- List of the oldest buildings in New Jersey
