= Cashier (oyster schooner) =

- U.S. National Register of Historic Places
- New Jersey Register of Historic Places
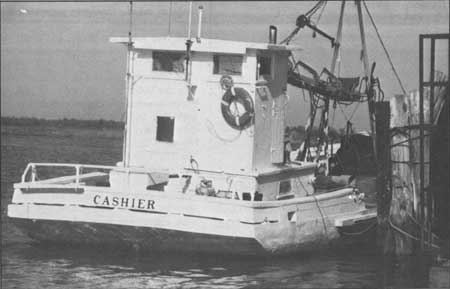
- Cashier, c. 1990

- Location within Cumberland County, New Jersey Location within New Jersey Location within the United States
- Location: Bayshore Center; 2800 High Street; Bivalve, New Jersey
- Coordinates: 39°14′0″N 75°2′2″W
- Built: 1849
- Built by: Milton Duffield
- NRHP reference No.: 15001050
- NJRHP No.: 5242

Significant dates
- Added to NRHP: February 8, 2016
- Designated NJRHP: December 16, 2015

Cashier is a former two-masted Delaware Bay oyster schooner located at the Bayshore Center in the Bivalve section of Commercial Township in Cumberland County, New Jersey. She was added to the National Register of Historic Places on February 8, 2016, for her significance in agriculture and maritime history. According to the nomination form, she is the "oldest, continuously-worked American-flagged merchant vessel in the United States".

== History and description ==
Built in Cedarville by Milton Duffield, she was launched in 1849 and worked the waters around Bivalve until 2000. An engine, shaft, and propeller were added in 1916. One mast was removed in 1938. She is currently sunk in a boat slip in a marsh of the Maurice River at the Bayshore Center. An exhibit, "Cashier's Pilothouse", is featured at the museum.

== See also ==
- National Register of Historic Places listings in Cumberland County, New Jersey
