= Potter's Tavern =

- U.S. National Register of Historic Places
- New Jersey Register of Historic Places
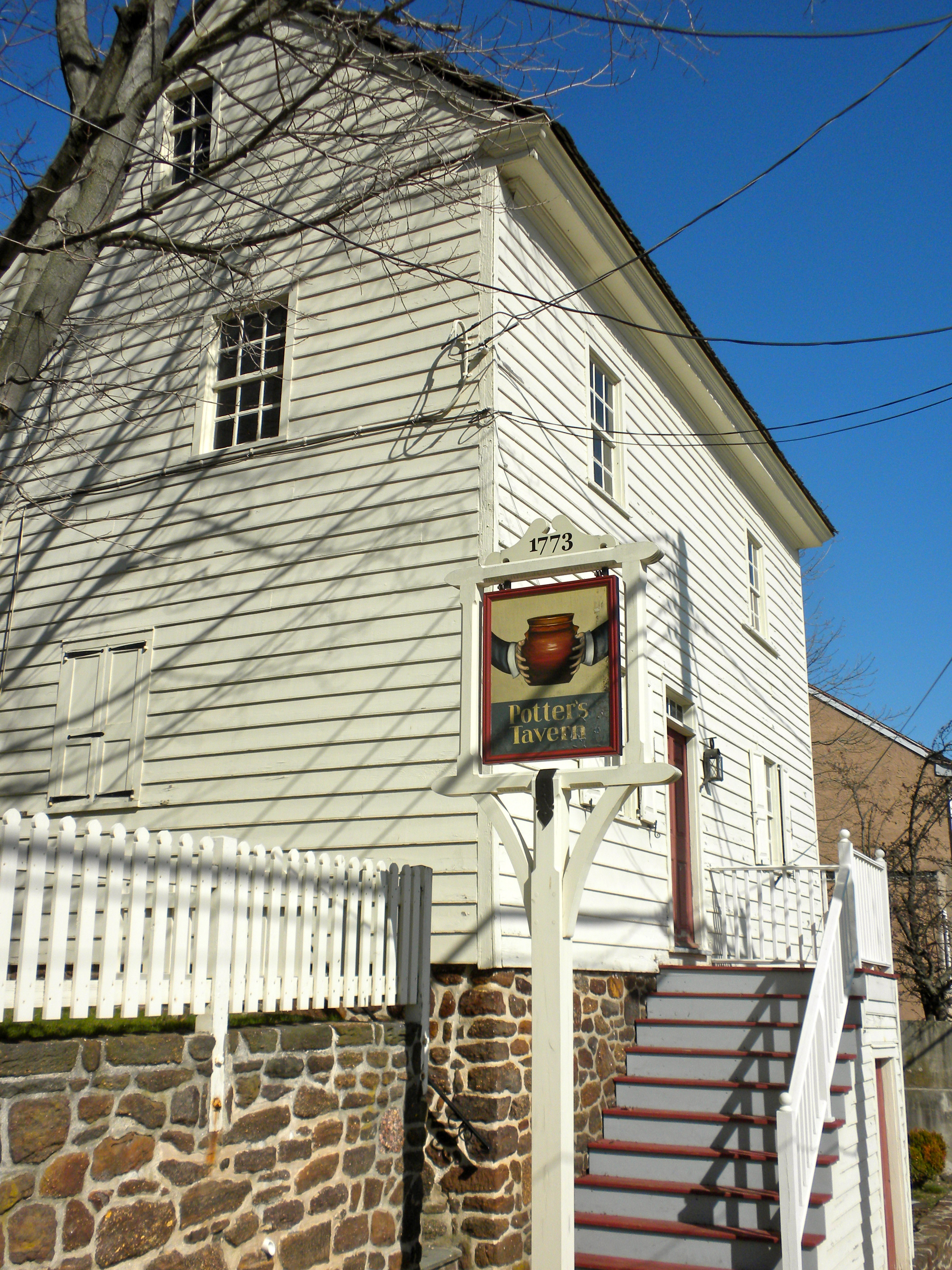

- Location within Cumberland County, New Jersey Location within New Jersey Location within the United States
- Location: 49–51 Broad Street, Bridgeton, New Jersey
- Coordinates: 39°25′40″N 75°14′20″W
- Built: 1770
- NRHP reference No.: 71000501
- NJRHP No.: 1031

Significant dates
- Added to NRHP: September 10, 1971
- Designated NJRHP: May 6, 1971

Potter's Tavern is located at 49–51 Broad Street in the city of Bridgeton in Cumberland County, New Jersey, United States. Built in 1770, it was added to the National Register of Historic Places on September 10, 1971, for its significance in architecture, communications, and politics. The building was documented by the Historic American Buildings Survey (HABS) in 2003.

== History and description ==
The tavern is a two and one-half story frame building constructed in 1770. Matthew Potter, a blacksmith from Philadelphia, was proprietor from 1774 to 1779. It was a popular spot during the years before the American Revolution. In December 1775, the newspaper The Plain Dealer, considered the first regular newspaper in New Jersey, was published here. Two future governors of New Jersey, Richard Howell and Joseph Bloomfield, wrote articles for the paper.

== See also ==
- National Register of Historic Places listings in Cumberland County, New Jersey
- List of the oldest buildings in New Jersey
