= Jonathan Elmer =

American politician (1745–1817)

Presiding judge of Cumberland County Court of Common Pleas
- In office 1813 – February 1814
- In office 1802–1804
- In office March 4, 1789 – March 3, 1791
- Preceded by: (none)
- Succeeded by: John Rutherfurd

Surrogate of Cumberland County
- In office 1784–1802

Trustee of The College of New Jersey
- In office 1782–1795

High Sheriff of Cumberland County
- In office 1772–1775

Personal details
- Born: November 29, 1745 Cedarville, New Jersey
- Died: September 3, 1817 (aged 71) Bridgeton, New Jersey
- Resting place: Old Broad Street Presbyterian Church Cemetery
- Party: Federalist Party
- Relations: Ebenezer Elmer (brother); Lucius Elmer (nephew)
- Education: University of Pennsylvania (BM, MD)

Military service
- Allegiance: United Colonies
- Rank: Captain
- Battles/wars: American Revolutionary War

Jonathan Elmer (November 29, 1745 – September 3, 1817) was an American politician, of the Pro-Administration (Federalist) Party.

== Early life ==
Jonathan Elmer was born in Cedarville, New Jersey, in 1745. He was the son of Reverend Daniel Elmer and Abigail (Lawrence) Elmer. He was privately tutored until 1765, when he began attendance in the first class of medical students at the University of Pennsylvania. He received the degree of bachelor of medicine in 1768, and 1771 he received his doctor of medicine degree, the first awarded by an American university.

== Early career ==
Elmer practiced medicine in Bridgeton and became active in government and politics. From 1772 to 1775, he served as sheriff of Cumberland County. During the American Revolutionary War he was a militia officer and attained the rank of captain as commander of a company. He was elected to the American Philosophical Society in 1774.

== Later career ==
Elmer was a delegate to the Continental Congress three times: 1777 to 1778, 1781 to 1783, and 1787 to 1788. In 1780 and 1784 he represented Cumberland County in the New Jersey Legislative Council. The College of New Jersey (now known as Princeton University) made Elmer a trustee in 1782. He served in that position until 1795. The New Jersey Legislature appointed Elmer to the United States Senate for the term of March 4, 1789 to March 3, 1791. He was later a candidate for the U.S. House of Representatives in 1792, and unsuccessfully attempted to return to the U.S. Senate twice in 1798.

His health declined after that, and Elmer died in 1817, and he was interred in Old Broad Street Presbyterian Church Cemetery in Bridgeton.

== Family ==
In 1769, Elmer married Mary Seeley, the daughter of Colonel Ephraim Seeley of Bridgeton. They were the parents of eight children.

Elmer's younger brother, Ebenezer Elmer, and Ebenezer's son Lucius Elmer were members of the United States House of Representatives.

U.S. Senate
Preceded by none	U.S. senator (Class 1) from New Jersey; 1789–1791; Served alongside: William Paterson, Philemon Dickinson	Succeeded by John Rutherfurd
