= List of lighthouses in New Jersey =

This is a list of all lighthouses in the U.S. state of New Jersey as identified by the United States Coast Guard.

Name	Image	Location	Coordinates	Year first lit	Automated	Year deactivated	Current Lens	Focal Height	Tower Height
Absecon Light		Atlantic City		1857	Never	1933	Decorative	167 ft (51 m)	171 ft (52 m)
Barnegat Lighthouse		Barnegat Light		1835 (Former); 1857 (Current)	1927	Active (Inactive: 1944–2009)	VRB-25	163 ft (50 m)	169 ft (52 m)
Brandywine Shoal Light		Delaware Bay (Lower)		1828 (Former); 1914 (Current)	1974	Active	Unknown	60 ft (18 m)	46 ft (14 m)
Cape May Light		Cape May Point		1823 (Former); 1859 (Current)	1933	Active (Inactive: 1940–1945)	VRB-25	160 ft (50 m)	157 ft (48 m) (165 ft (50 m) above sea level)
Chapel Hill Rear Range Light		Leonardo		1856	Never	1957 (Now a private house)	None	Unknown	55 ft (orig.) 45 ft (current)
Conover Beacon		Leonardo		1856	1941	1957	None	Unknown	55 ft (orig.) 45 ft (current)
Cross Ledge Light		Downe Township		1875	Never	1910 (Now ruins)	None	58 ft (18 m)	Unknown
East Point (Maurice River) Light		Heislerville		1849	1911	Active (Inactive: 1941–1980)	Fourth-order Fresnel	43 ft (13 m)	40 ft (12.2 m)
Elbow of Cross Ledge Light		Delaware Bay (Middle)		1910	1951	1953 (Destroyed)	None	61 ft (19 m)	Unknown
Finns Point Range Light		Pennsville Township		1877	1934	1950	None	Unknown	115 ft (35 m)
Great Beds Light		South Amboy		1880	1945	Active	Unknown	62 ft (19 m)	61 ft (19 m)
Hereford Inlet Light		North Wildwood		1874	1986 (Relit)	Active (Inactive: 1964–1986)	VRB-25	56 ft (17 m)	57 ft (17 m)
Ludlam's Beach Light		Sea Isle City		1885	Never	1924 (Destroyed)	None	Unknown	36 ft (11 m)
Miah Maull Shoal Light		Downe Township		1913	1973	Active	500mm	59 ft (18 m)	46 ft (14 m)
Navesink Twin Lights		Highlands		1828 (Former); 1862 (Current)	1949	Active (North tower)	Unknown	Unknown	Unknown
Robbins Reef Light		Bayonne		1839 (Former); 1883 (Current)	Unknown	Active	300mm	56 ft (17 m)	45 ft (14 m)
Romer Shoal Light		Lower New York Bay		1838 (Former); 1898 (Current)	1966	Active	190mm	54 ft (16 m)	54 feet (16 m)
Sandy Hook Light		Middletown Township (Sandy Hook)		1764	1941	Active	Unknown	89 ft (27 m)	103 ft (31 m)
Sea Girt Light		Sea Girt		1896	Never	1955	None	60 ft (18 m)	44 ft (13 m)
Ship John Shoal Light		Delaware Bay (Upper)		1877	1973	Active	VRB-25	50 ft (15 m)	46 ft (14 m)
Tinicum Island Rear Range Light		Paulsboro		1880	1933	Active	DCB-24	112 ft (34 m)	85 ft (26 m)
Tucker's Beach Light		Tuckerton	N/A	1848 (Original); 1980s (Replica)	Never	1927 (Destroyed)	LED (Non-navigational replica)	Unknown	Unknown
Waackaack Rear Range Light		Keansburg		1856 (The last L.H. was built in 1894)	Never	1959 (Scrapped)	None	Unknown	96 ft (29 m) (first) 106 ft (32 m) (second)
