= Heislerville Wildlife Management Area =

Protected area in New Jersey, US

Heislerville Wildlife Management Area, New Jersey
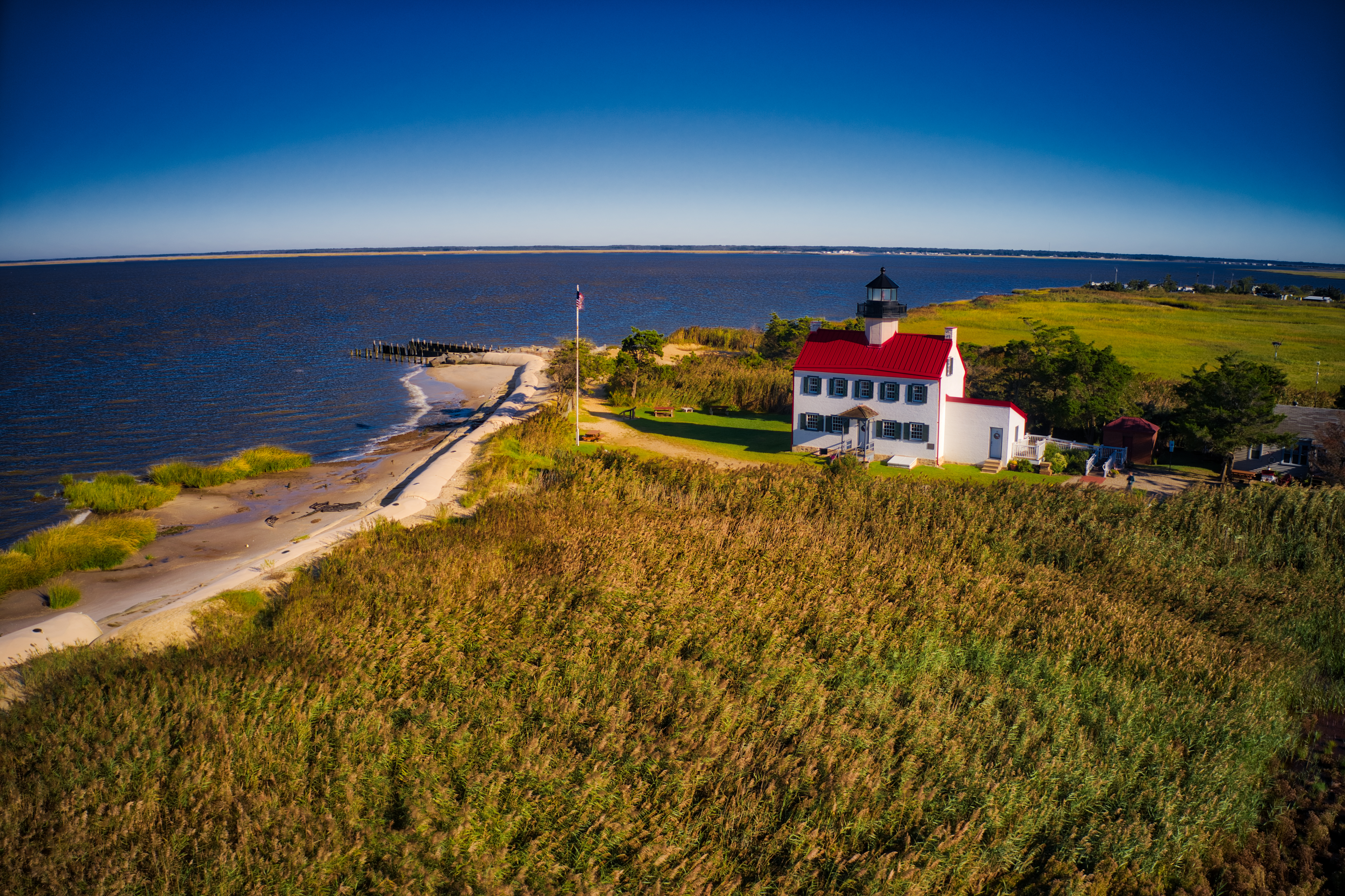
- East Point Light is positioned in the southwestern corner of the WMA.

- Location within Cumberland County, New Jersey
- Location: Maurice River Township, Cumberland County, New Jersey
- Nearest city: Millville
- Coordinates: 39°11′45″N 75°1′38″W
- Area: 7,670 acres (3,100 ha)
- Governing body: New Jersey Division of Fish and Wildlife

Heislerville Wildlife Management Area is a Wildlife Management Area located in the unincorporated community and census-designated place (CDP) of Heislerville that is part of Maurice River Township in Cumberland County in the U.S. state of New Jersey.

The Maurice River makes up the western boundary of the Wildlife Management Area as it empties into the Delaware Bay; bayshore areas are East Point and Thompson's Beach, now flooded by the state of New Jersey for use as a bird watch conservatory.

The East Point Lighthouse was built in 1849, located on the northern side of Delaware Bay at the mouth of the circuitous Maurice River. The lighthouse is open a few days every year. The beach adjacent to the lighthouse has suffered from serious erosion with the Army Corps of Engineers installing geotubes to protect the lighthouse from storm surges and flooding.

== Activities ==
There are two impoundments along Matt's Landing road. The northern impoundment is kept flooded and is a popular place for fishing and crabbing for blue claw crab. There are two islands in the north impoundment, one that serves as a rookery for double-crested cormorant.

The southern impoundment is managed to provide habitat for shorebird migration and is a wonderful place to see a wide variety of avian species.

This impoundment is also popular with crabbers. It is separated from a tidally influenced salt marsh by a dike that is walkable, but only a portion is accessible by motor vehicle.

A third impoundment, east of the second, is connected to the latter by a dirt road suitable for driving, walking and cycling. This impoundment is connected to the salt marsh and is influenced by the tides. It's a reliable spot for viewing waterfowl and crabbing.

== Fauna ==
Bald eagles, waterfowl and gulls can be observed year-round. From April through September Heislerville is a reliable place for a number of avian species. Osprey who nest throughout the WMA, are abundant. Other common raptors include red-tailed hawk, turkey vultures and northern harriers. Peeps and waders can be found in the second impoundment, located south of Matt's landing road. Species such as semipalmated sandpiper, least sandpiper, killdeer, semipalmated plover, willet, greater yellowlegs, lesser yellowlegs, Forster's tern, least tern, short-billed dowitcher, ruddy turnstone, dunlin, black-bellied plover, black skimmer, great blue heron, snowy egret, great egret, glossy ibis, Canada goose and mute swan are reliably found at Heislerville, particularly near the impoundments.

Some bird species like clapper rails are often heard, but not seen. Red-winged blackbird, boat-tailed grackle, fish crow, and a variety of warblers and other songbirds can be seen throughout Heisllerville.

Diamondback terrapin can be seen in the Maurice River and Delaware Bay. In the spring, the horseshoe crabs spawn in the Delaware bay and many can be seen on the beach near the lighthouse where shorebirds, including the red knot rely on their eggs as a food source.

== Gallery ==
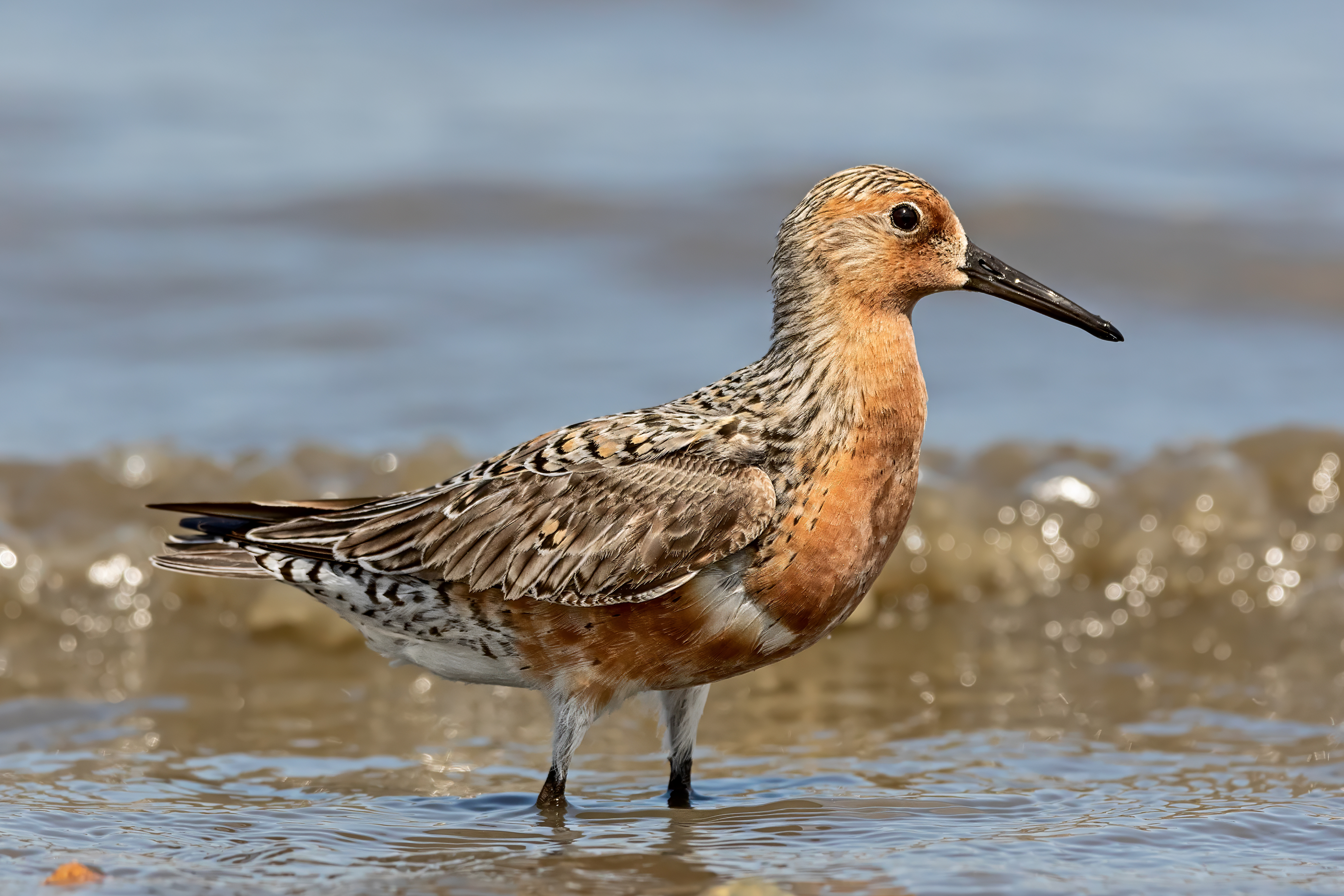
The rufa red knot can be found in late spring foraging on horseshoe crab roe.

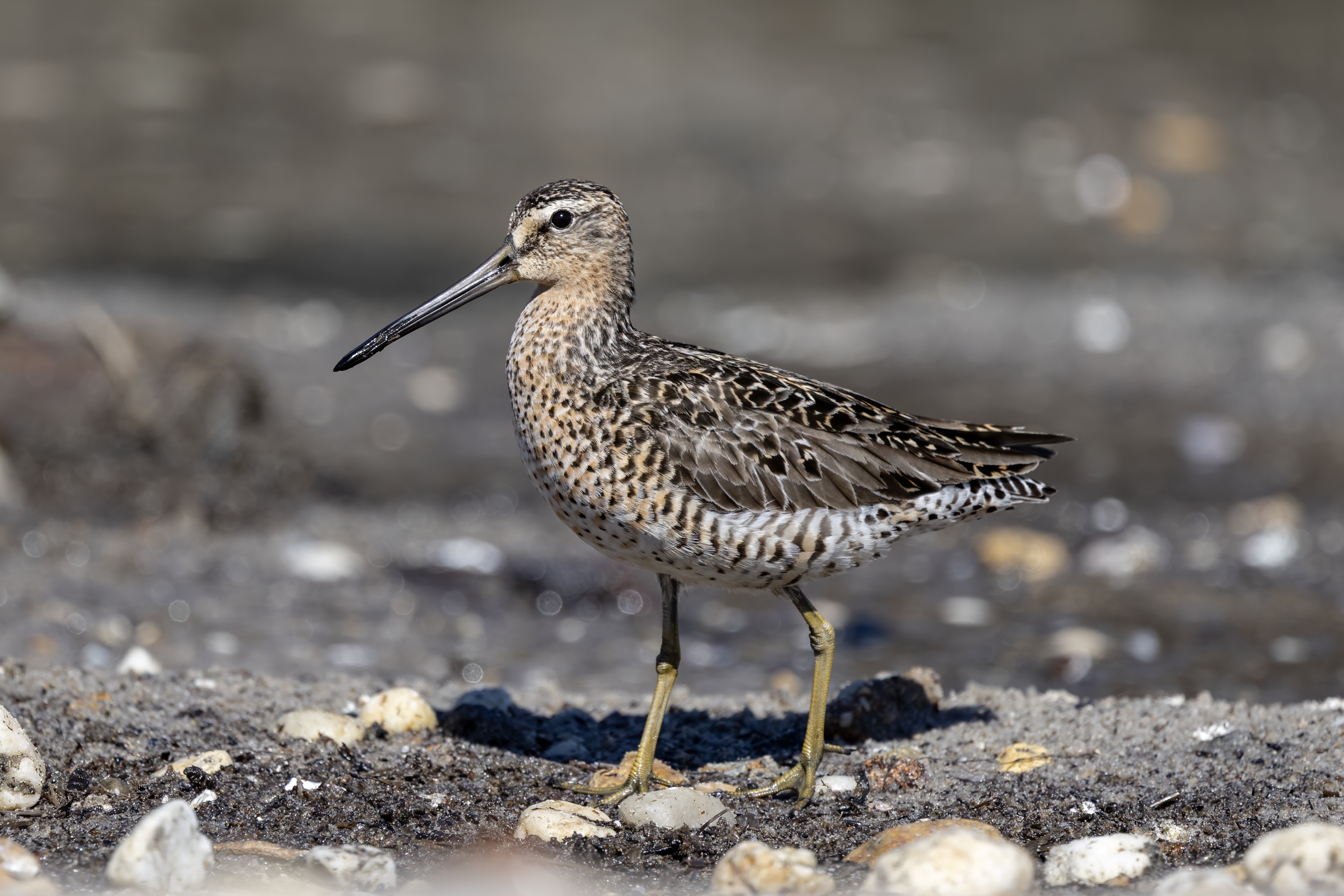
Shortbilled-dowitcher

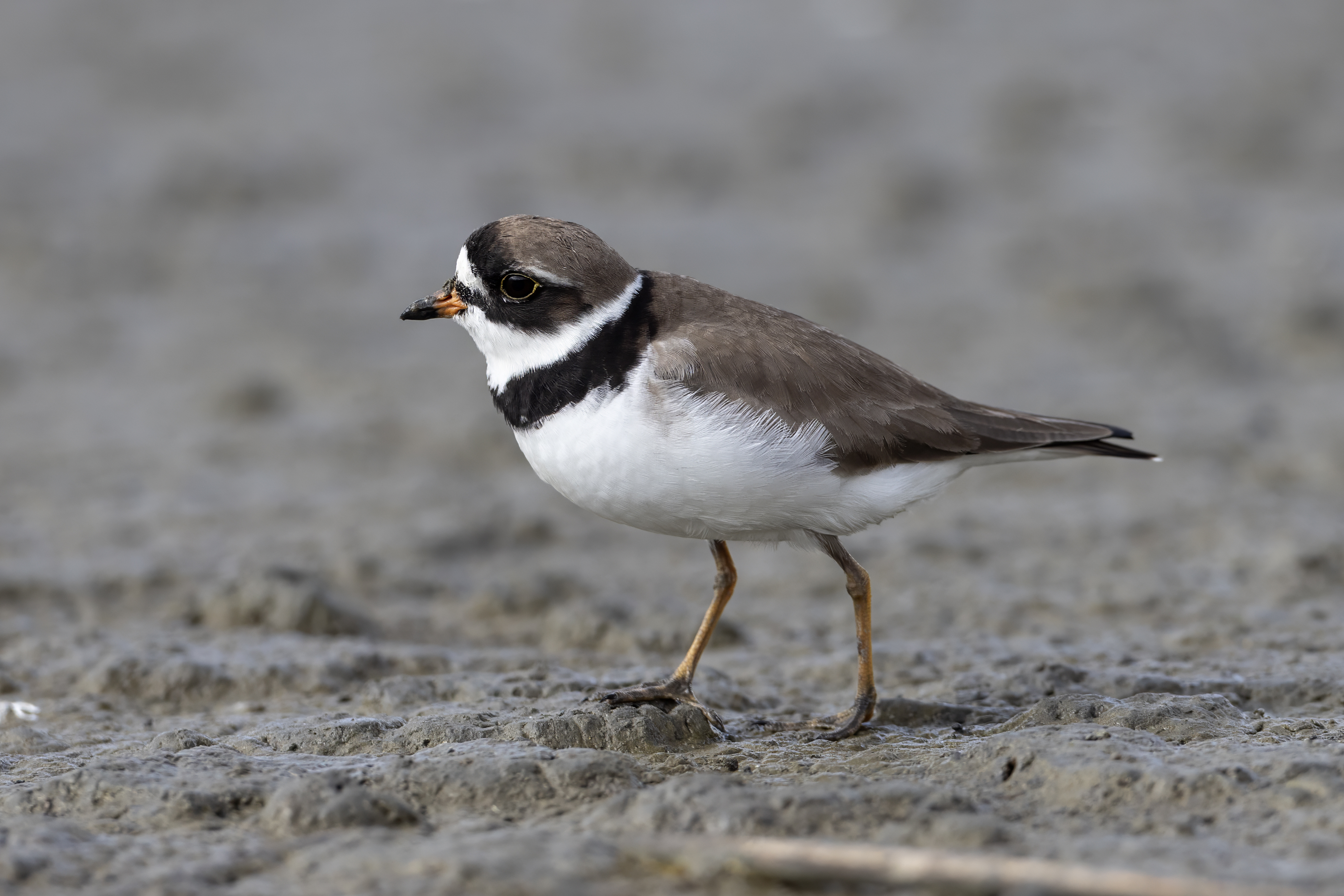
Semipalmated plover

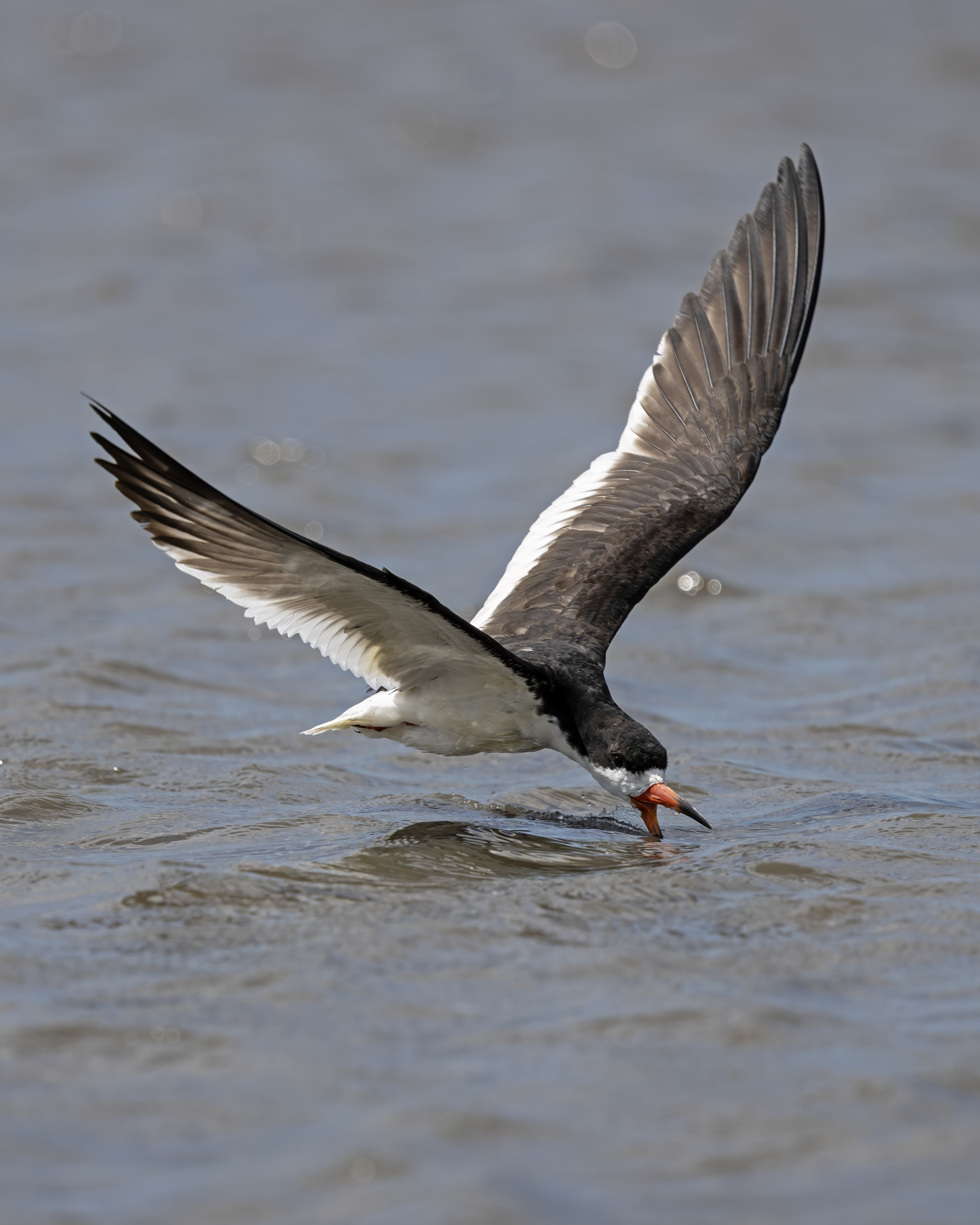
Black skimmer

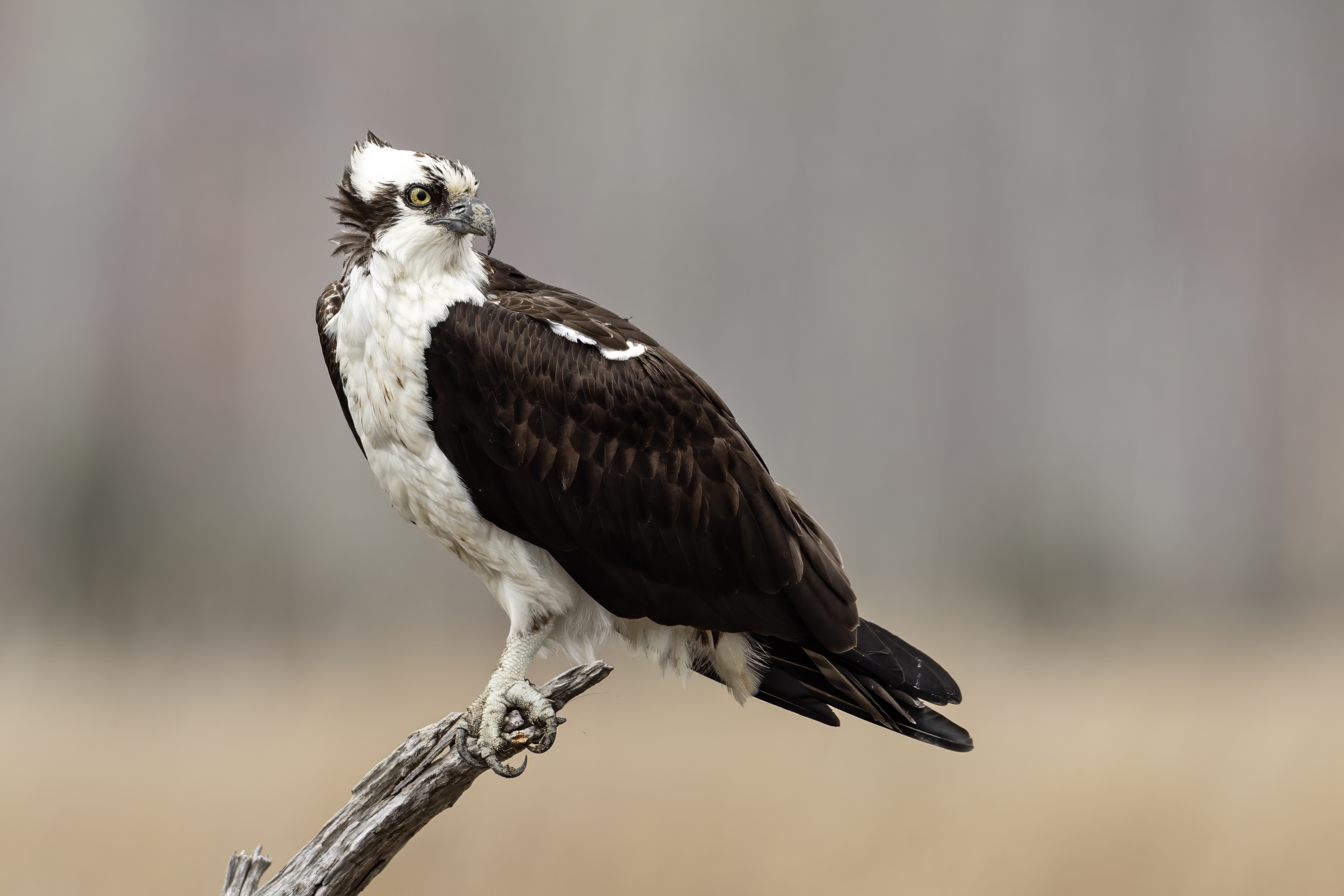
Ospreys nest throughout Heislerville.

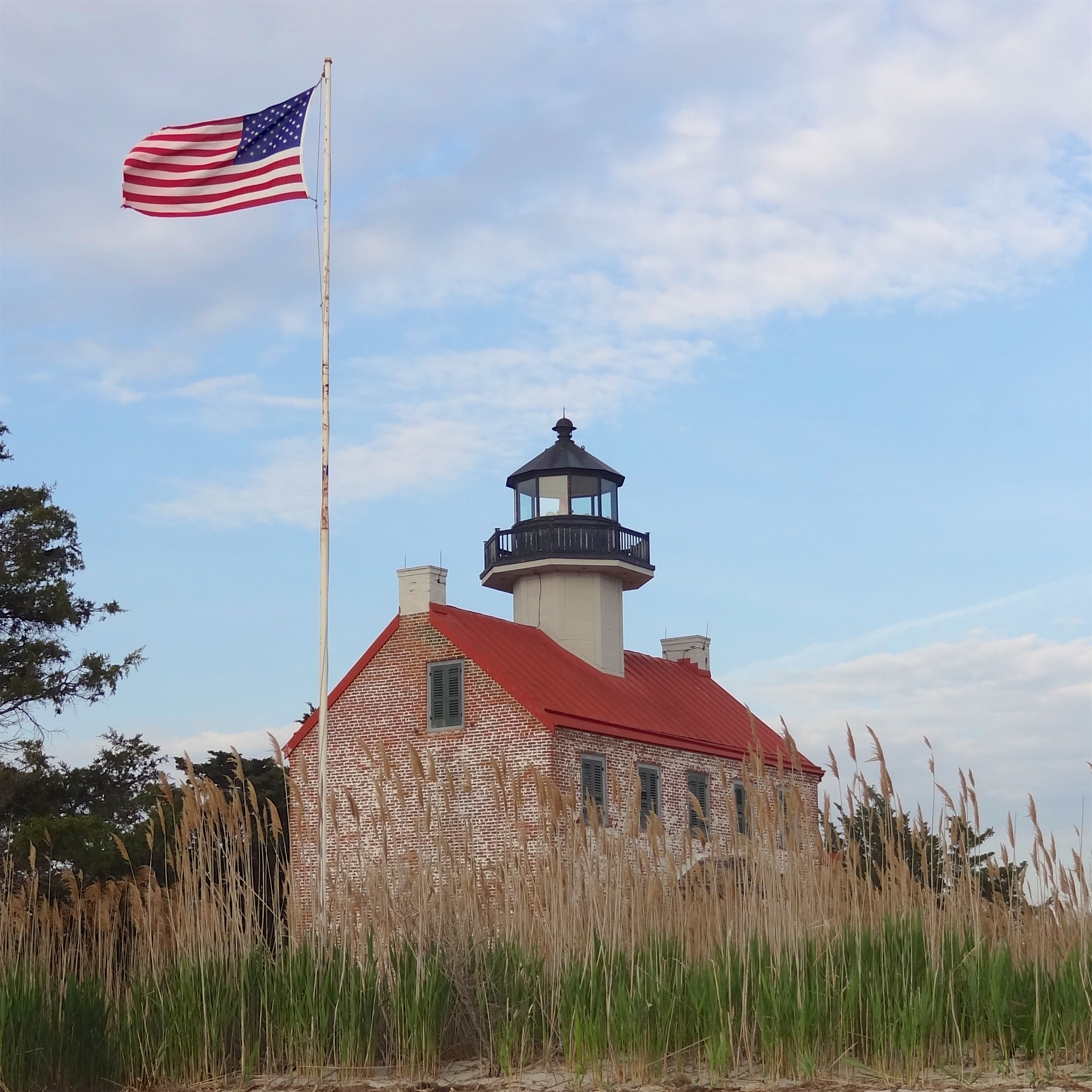
East Point Light

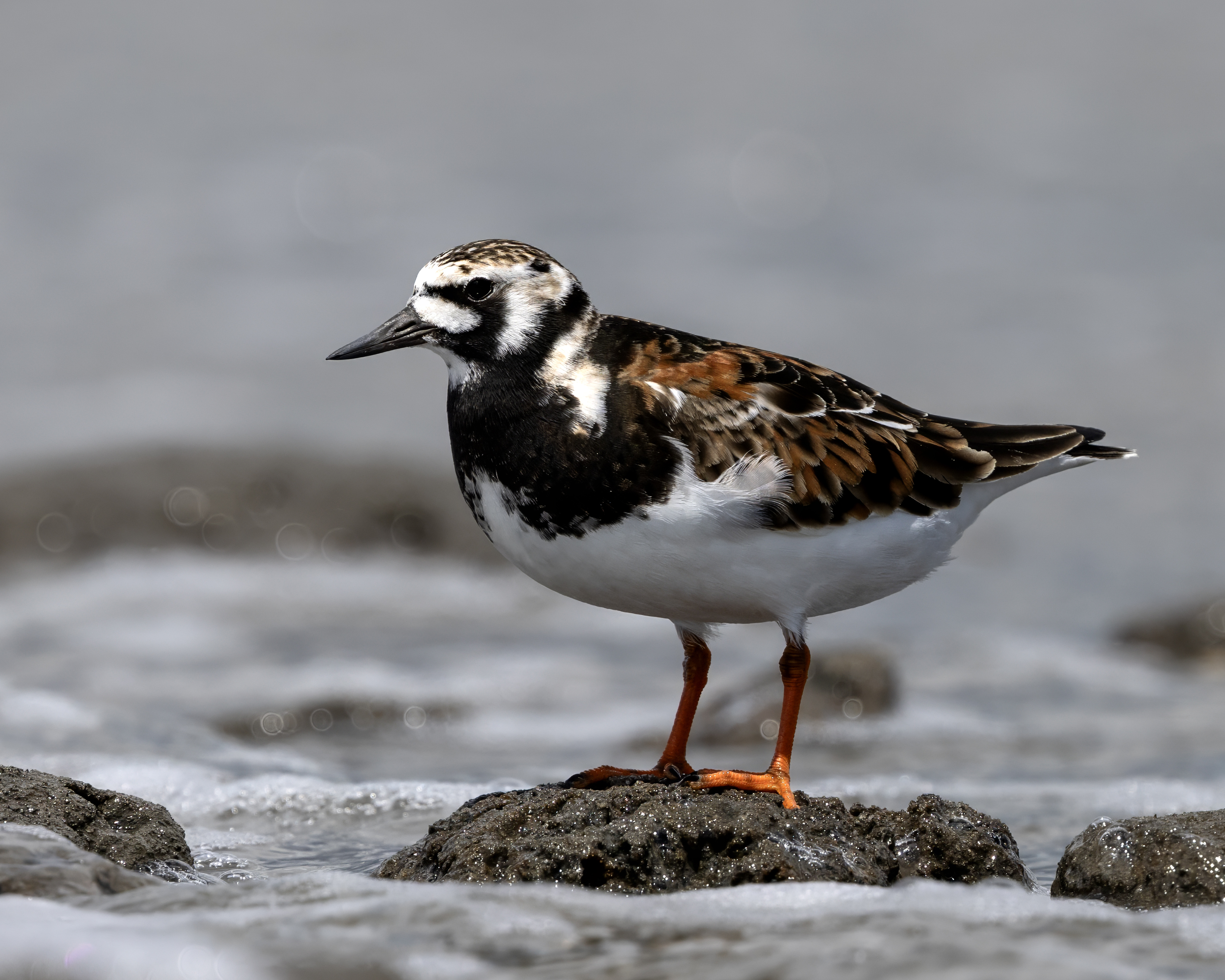
Ruddy turnstone (Arenaria interpres) in breeding plumage.

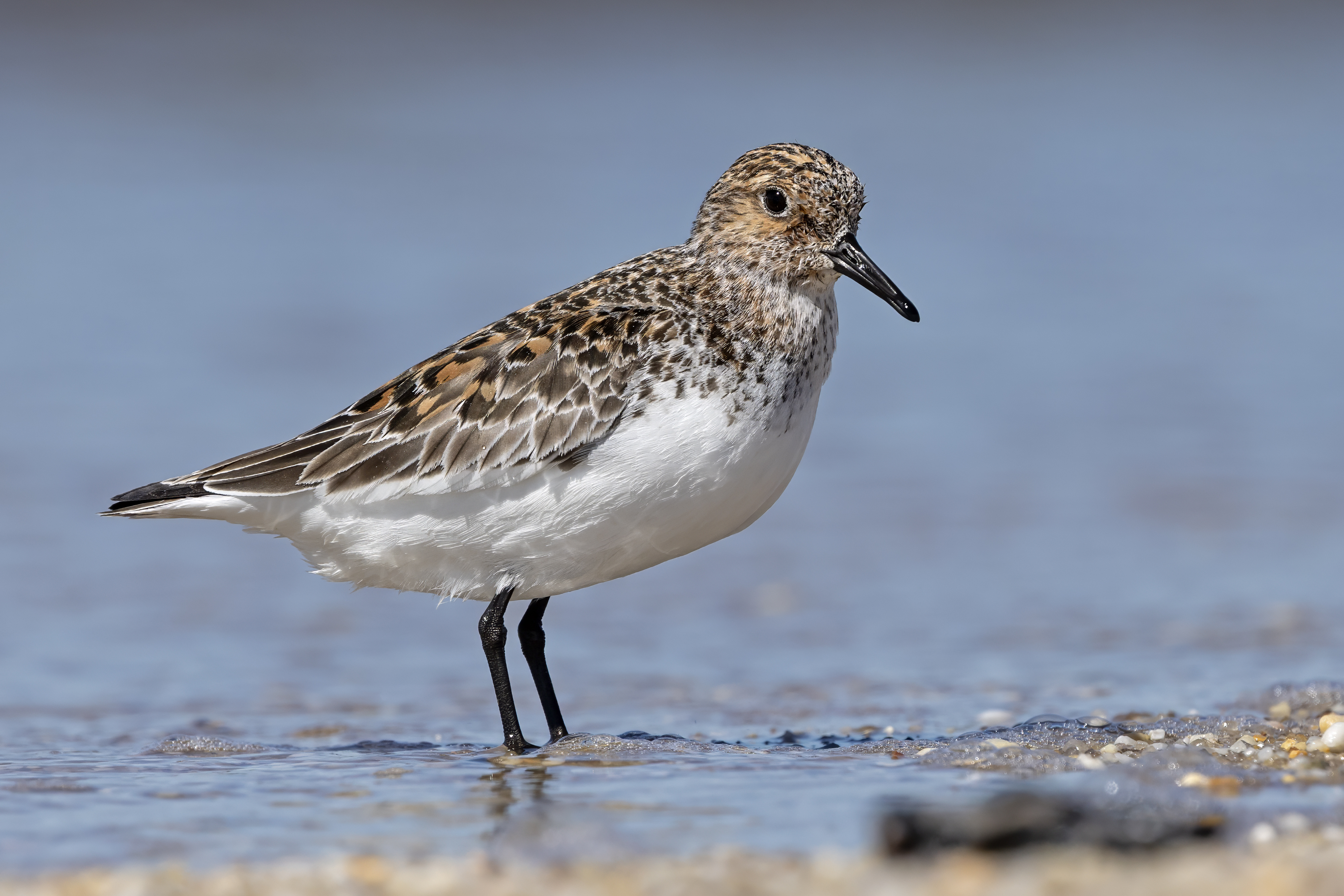
A Sanderling in breeding plumage on the beach at the end of Thompson Beach Road
