= SS Sea Adder =

SS Sea Adder may refer to one of two Type C3-S-A2 ships built for the United States Maritime Commission:

- SS Sea Adder (1944) (MC hull number 1551), built by Western Pipe and Steel; acquired by the United States Navy and converted to Bayfield-class attack transport USS Hansford (APA-106); sold for commercial service in 1947; scrapped in 1973
- SS Sea Adder (1945) (MC hull number 883), built by Ingalls Shipbuilding; delivered in May 1945; sold 1947; scrapped in 1975
