= Miah Maull Shoal Light =

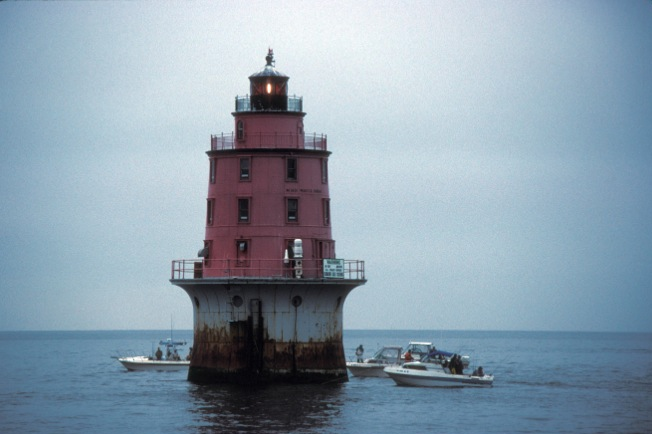
- Location: Lower Delaware Bay 5 mi. SW of Egg Island Point, Delaware Bay
- Coordinates: 39°7′36″N 75°12′35″W

Tower
- Constructed: 1913
- Foundation: cast iron caisson
- Construction: cast iron
- Automated: 1974
- Height: 14 m (46 ft)
- Shape: conical with lantern on top
- Heritage: National Register of Historic Places listed place
- Racon: M

Light
- Focal height: 59 feet (18 m)
- Lens: fourth order Fresnel lens (original), 500 millimetres (20 in) (current)
- Range: 12 nautical miles (22 km; 14 mi)
- Characteristic: Occulting 4s
- Miah Maull Shoal Lighthouse
- U.S. National Register of Historic Places
- New Jersey Register of Historic Places
- Area: 0.7 acres (0.28 ha)
- Architect: Lynchburg Foundry Co.; Tatnall-Brown Co.
- Architectural style: Conical tower lighthouse
- NRHP reference No.: 90002188
- NJRHP No.
- Added to NRHP: February 4, 1991

The Miah Maull Shoal Light is a lighthouse on the north side of the ship channel in Delaware Bay, off of Cumberland County, New Jersey on the East Coast of the United States, southwest of the mouth of the Maurice River.

== History ==
This light, the last offshore lighthouse to be erected in Delaware Bay, marks one of a series of shoals along the eastern side of the shipping channel, between the Elbow of Cross Ledge Light and the Brandywine Shoal Light. The name of the shoal commemorates Nehemiah Maull, a river pilot who was drowned in 1780 when the ship in which he intended to sail to England in order to make a claim on an inheritance was wrecked on the then-unnamed shoal.

This light and the Elbow of Cross Ledge Light were intended to replace the Cross Ledge Light, and appropriations for both were first requested in 1904. In the case of this light construction was delayed by the inability of the first contractor to set the caisson before exhausting the budget, so that the caisson was not set in place until 1909. A wooden shed was mounted and a light first exhibited that September, but the superstructure was not completed until 1913, again due to financial requirements.

Originally the light was painted brown, and a fourth-order Fresnel lens imported from France was used. This lens was later replaced by an American-made model which served until the early 2000s. Around 1940 the superstructure was painted red, a color it has retained ever since. The keepers of this light controlled that of the Elbow of Cross Ledge Light when the latter was automated in 1951. In 1973 the light was automated.

The Fresnel lens has recently been replaced with a conventional modern 500 mm beacon, with the old lens to be displayed at the East Point Light.

In June 2011, the General Services Administration made the Miah Maull Shoal Light (along with 11 others) available at no cost to public organizations willing to preserve them.

The grandson of Nehemiah Maull's great-great-granddaughter (Ethel Maxwell), Bryan Helm, served for many years as Port Captain of the Cape May, New Jersey and Delaware Bay Authority, not far from where his direct ancestor, Nehemiah Maull, worked as Delaware River pilot. He is a graduate of the Merchant Marine Academy and is a Navy reservist.

As of 7/7/15, it was for sale by the General Services Administration with a minimum bid of $10,000.00.

== See also ==
- National Register of Historic Places listings in Cumberland County, New Jersey
