= Ship John Shoal Light =

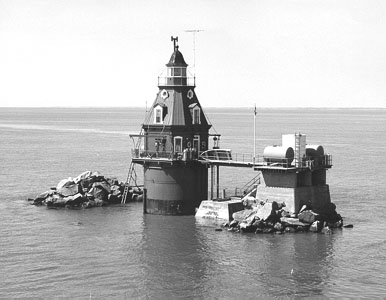
- Ship John Shoal Light (USCG)
- Location: Upper Delaware Bay near the Bombay Hook NWR
- Coordinates: 39°18′19″N 75°22′36″W

Tower
- Constructed: 1877
- Foundation: Cast iron caisson
- Construction: Cast iron with wood lining
- Automated: 1973
- Height: 14 m (46 ft)
- Shape: Octagonal house with lantern on mansard roof
- Markings: Brown with black lantern
- Heritage: National Register of Historic Places listed place
- Fog signal: Original: Bell, 3 every 45s Current: Horn, 1 every 15s
- Racon: "O" (Oscar)

Light
- First lit: 1877
- Focal height: 50 feet (15 m)
- Lens: Fourth order Fresnel lens (original), VRB-25 (current)
- Range: White 16 nautical miles (30 km; 18 mi); Red 12 nautical miles (22 km; 14 mi)
- Characteristic: Flashing white 5s with red sector
- Ship John Shoal Light Station
- U.S. National Register of Historic Places
- New Jersey Register of Historic Places
- Area: 4.9 acres (2.0 ha)
- Architect: U.S. Lighthouse Board
- Architectural style: Second Empire
- MPS: Light Stations of the United States MPS
- NRHP reference No.: 06000630
- NJRHP No.
- Added to NRHP: July 19, 2006

The Ship John Shoal Light marks the north side of the ship channel in Delaware Bay on the east coast of the United States, near the Bombay Hook National Wildlife Refuge. Its cast iron superstructure was exhibited at the 1876 Centennial Exposition in Philadelphia, Pennsylvania.

== History ==
Ship John Shoal took its name from an incident in 1797 in which the John, captained by Robert Folger, ran aground while on the way from Hamburg, Germany to Philadelphia. Passengers and cargo were unloaded safely, but the vessel was lost. (The figurehead is on exhibit in the Gibbon House Museum in Greenwich, New Jersey, the town to which the rescued passengers were taken.)

Completion of the original Brandywine Shoal Light in 1850 led the Lighthouse Board to draw up plans to erect similar lights at Ship John Shoal and Cross Ledge. Both of these were intended to be of the then-new screw-pile design. During construction of the Cross Ledge Light in the winter of 1856, however, ice carried away the entire structure, prompting reconsideration of the suitability of this type of foundation. In the 1870s caisson foundations became available, and in 1873 Congress appropriated funds toward the construction of a caisson light on the shoal. Wooden piles were driven and the caisson placed in 1874; however, insufficient time remained in the working season to complete the light, and a temporary structure was placed to allow display of a light from November of that year.

The incomplete structure managed to withstand the winter ice, but in January the keepers abandoned their temporary refuge out of fear that it would be overturned. They were able to return in March, but by then, the permanent superstructure had been diverted to the Southwest Ledge Light in Connecticut. An identical cast iron house was fabricated, but it was diverted to Philadelphia for display at the Centennial Exhibition, where it was even occupied by a keeper tending a working light in its lantern. The house did not reach the caisson until the summer of 1877; in the meantime, a lightship was stationed alongside the unfinished structure. The base had also been surrounded with 2,000 tons of riprap to ward off ice damage.

In 1907 additional riprap was dumped around the light, and about the same time a concrete platform was built on one of the two piles of rock in order to hold tanks for which there was no room in the light itself. In 1973 the light was automated, and four years later the original Fresnel lens was removed and replaced by a solar powered beacon, whose solar panels stand on the platform where the tanks once rested.

In June 2011, the General Services Administration made the Ship John Shoal Light (along with 11 others) available at no cost to public organizations willing to preserve them.

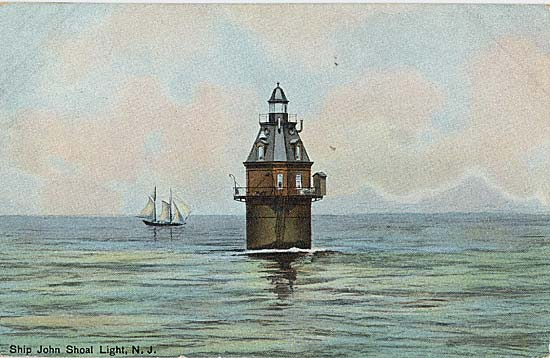
Light shown in a pre-1914 postcard
