= Southwest Ledge Light =

Southwest Ledge Light New Haven Breakwater
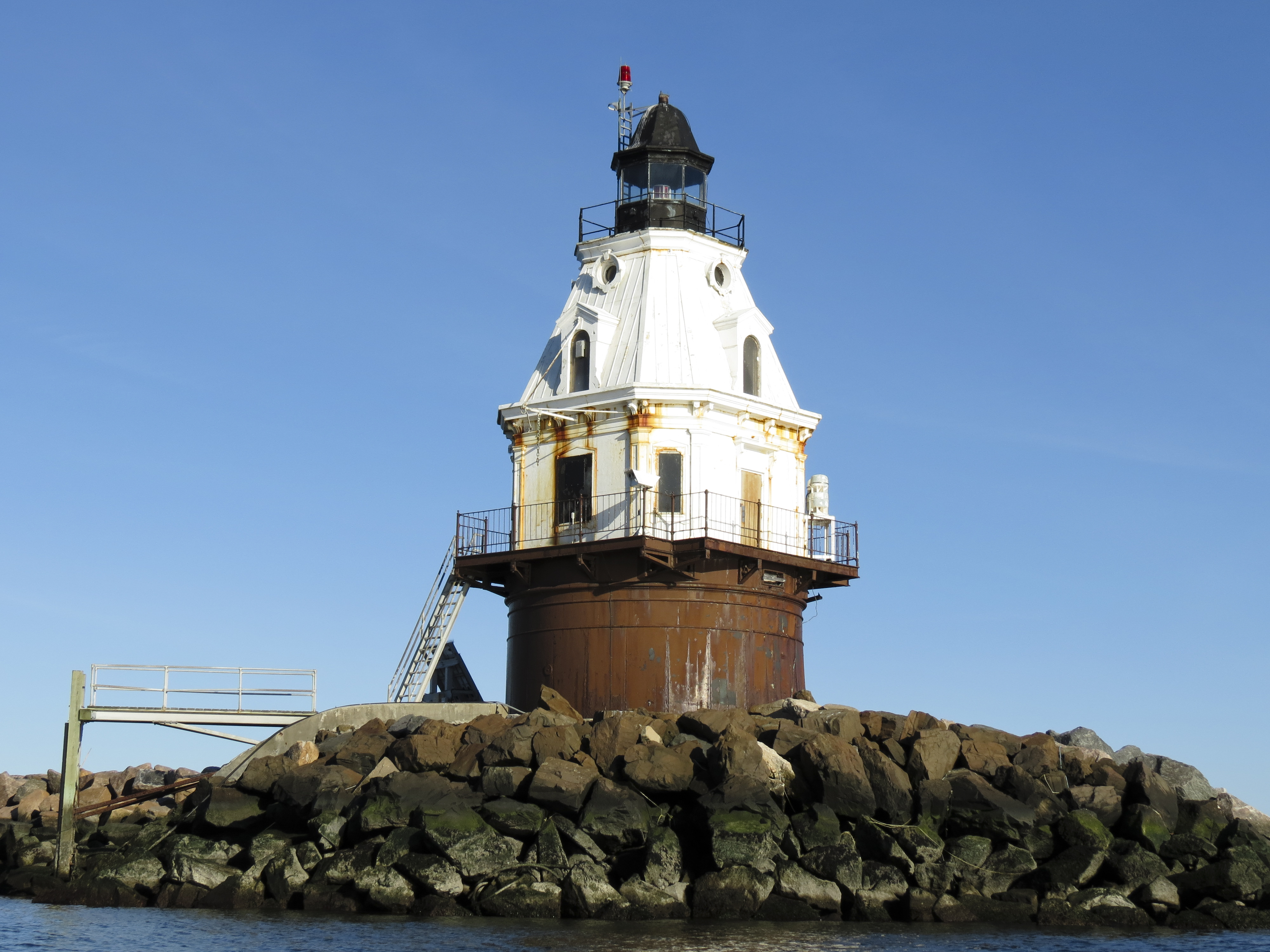
- Southwest Ledge Light
- Location: New Haven; Connecticut; United States
- Coordinates: 41°14′04.08″N 72°54′43.55″W

Tower
- Constructed: 1877
- Foundation: cast iron and concrete caisson basement
- Construction: cast iron tower
- Automated: 1973
- Height: 45 ft (14 m)
- Shape: octagonal tower with balcony and lantern incorporating 2-storey keeper's quarter
- Markings: white tower, black lantern, brown basement
- Power source: solar power
- Operator: United States Coast Guard
- Heritage: National Register of Historic Places listed place
- Fog signal: 1 blast every 15s

Light
- Focal height: 57 ft (17 m)
- Lens: Fourth order Fresnel lens (original), VRB-25 (current)
- Range: 14 nautical miles (26 km; 16 mi)
- Characteristic: Fl R 5s.
- Southwest Ledge Lighthouse
- U.S. National Register of Historic Places
- Location: New Haven, Connecticut
- Coordinates: 41°13′53″N 72°55′25″W
- Area: less than one acre
- Built: 1876
- Architect: Elliot, Maj. George H.
- Architectural style: Second Empire
- MPS: Operating Lighthouses in Connecticut MPS
- NRHP reference No.: 89001475
- Added to NRHP: May 29, 1990

Southwest Ledge Light is an active lighthouse marking the main entrance channel to the harbor of New Haven, Connecticut. Completed in 1877, it was one of the first to be built on a cylindrical iron foundation, an innovation by Maj. George H. Elliot to address shifting ice that is regarded to be very important in lighthouse design. The lighthouse was listed on the National Register of Historic Places in 1990 as Southwest Ledge Lighthouse.

== Description ==
The Southwest Ledge Light is located at the southwestern end of a breakwater on the eastern side of the main channel into New Haven Harbor. The breakwater was built upon an underwater rock formation that the light was originally built as a warning for. The light consists of a three-story structure, which is mounted on a circular iron structure set in concrete surrounded by riprap. The structure is octagonal in shape, with an open balcony and railing around its main level, supported by large metal brackets. It is covered by a mansard roof, above which the lantern house rises. The lantern house is also surrounded by a railing, and is covered by a bellcast roof. The building's architectural styling is Second Empire, with bracketed window surrounds, bracketed eaves, and round-arch dormers in the roof. Most of these parts are cast iron; the interior chambers are framed in wood.

== History ==
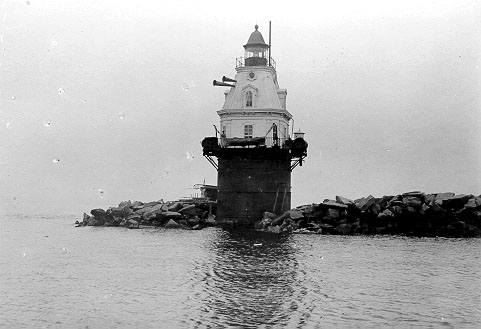
Historic Photo

Construction on the Southwest Ledge Lighthouse started in 1873 and was finished in 1877. The superstructure originally intended for this light was put on display at the Philadelphia Exposition of 1876; in order to more quickly finish the light, however, a duplicate superstructure was built and installed at this light. The original house remained at the exposition until its close, and was then used for the Ship John Shoal Light in Delaware Bay.

The foundation of the lighthouse was reinforced in 1911, and boat cranes (of which only foundations remain today) were added in the 1930s to facilitate access. The lighthouse was automated in 1973, and remains an active aid to navigation. It was placed up for sale in August 2016, and was sold to Dr. Casey Jordan of Beacon Preservation, Inc., in September 2016.

== Head keepers ==
- Elizur Thompson (1877 – 1881)
- Henry C. Thompson (1881 – 1898)
- Frank C. Hall (1898 – 1905)
- Jorgen Tonnesen (1905 – 1914)
- John Petterson (at least 1915 – at least 1917)
- David Griffiths (at least 1918 – at least 1919)
- Albert Wilkinson (at least 1921 – at least 1922)
- John Ostman (at least 1935 – at least 1940)
- Michael Scanlan (1942 – 1943)

== See also ==
- List of lighthouses in Connecticut
- List of lighthouses in the United States
- National Register of Historic Places listings in New Haven, Connecticut
