= Delmont, New Jersey =

Populated place in Cumberland County, New Jersey, US

- Census-designated place
- Location in Cumberland County Location in New Jersey Location in the United States
- Coordinates: 39°12′51″N 74°57′00″W
- Country: United States
- State: New Jersey
- County: Cumberland
- Township: Maurice River

Area
  - Total: 1.08 sq mi (2.80 km^{2})
  - Land: 1.08 sq mi (2.80 km^{2})
  - Water: 0 sq mi (0.00 km^{2})
- Elevation: 10 ft (3.0 m)

Population (2020)
  - Total: 122
  - Density: 113.0/sq mi (43.64/km^{2})
- ZIP Code: 08314
- FIPS code: 34-17410
- GNIS feature ID: 2806070

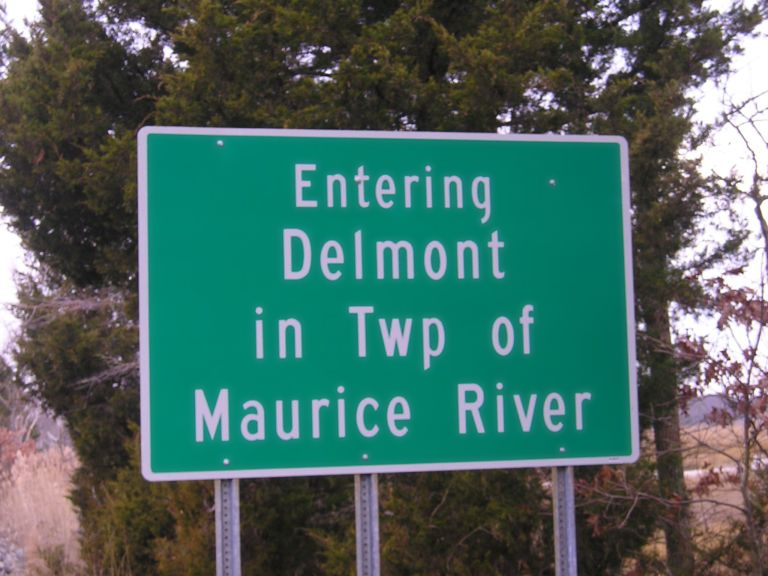
Welcome sign

Delmont is an unincorporated community and census-designated place (CDP) located within Maurice River Township, in Cumberland County, in the U.S. state of New Jersey. The area is served as United States Postal Service ZIP Code 08314. It was first listed as a CDP in the 2020 census with a population of 122.

The community was founded by European settlers in 1770. Until 1891, it was called Ewings Neck. The Ewing family was one of the first to settle in the area and a "neck" is a name often given to a stretch of higher ground surrounded by marshes and low-lands.

The New Jersey Department of Corrections Southern State Correctional Facility is in the Delmont area of the township.

== Demographics ==
Historical population
Census	Pop.	Note	%±
2020	122		—
U.S. Decennial Census

Delmont first appeared as a census designated place in the 2020 U.S. census.

Delmont CDP, New Jersey – Racial and ethnic composition Note: the US Census treats Hispanic/Latino as an ethnic category. This table excludes Latinos from the racial categories and assigns them to a separate category. Hispanics/Latinos may be of any race.
Race / Ethnicity (NH = Non-Hispanic)	Pop 2020	2020
White alone (NH)	107	87.70%
Black or African American alone (NH)	1	0.82%
Native American or Alaska Native alone (NH)	0	0.00%
Asian alone (NH)	1	0.82%
Native Hawaiian or Pacific Islander alone (NH)	0	0.00%
Other race alone (NH)	1	0.82%
Mixed race or Multiracial (NH)	6	4.92%
Hispanic or Latino (any race)	6	4.92%
Total	122	100.00%

As of 2020, the population for the area was 122.

== Historic structures ==
- Delmont's post office was established in 1851; mail first came by stagecoach and later by train after the Cape May and Millville Railroad opened in 1863.
- Delmont's first church was a one-room wooden structure which also served as the village's first school.
- Delmont United Methodist Church was built in 1872. The aging structure received renovations in Fall 2010 with the help of thousands of dollars' worth of donations from churchgoers and local businesses.
- Delmont School – a two-story wood-frame structure – was built in 1887. It was demolished in the summer of 2006 in order to make way for the town's first park.

== Education ==
Students are zoned to Maurice River Township School District.
