= USS Hansford =

1944 Bayfield-class attack transport

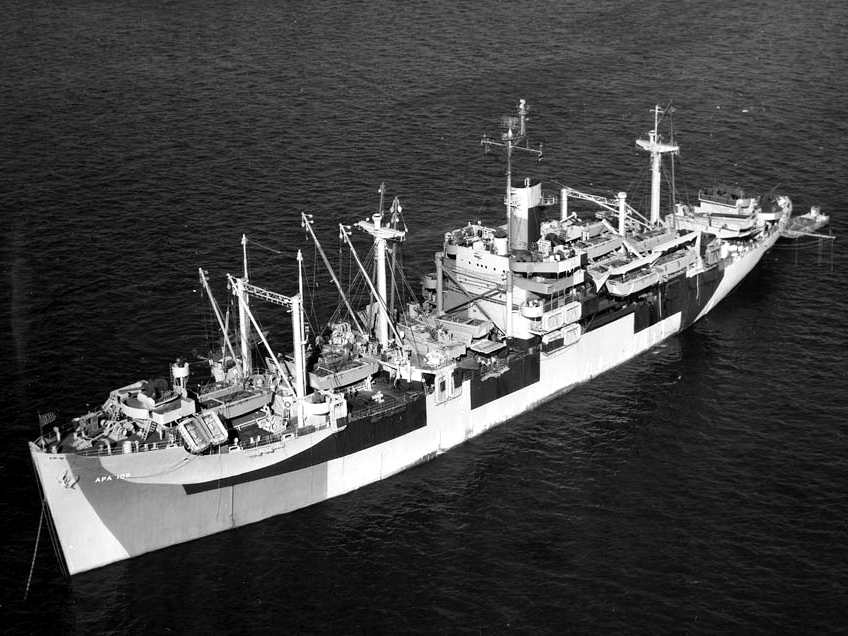
- USS Hansford (APA-106) in November 1944

History

United States
- Name: USS Hansford
- Namesake: Hansford County, Texas
- Builder: Western Pipe & Steel
- Laid down: 10 December 1943
- Launched: 25 April 1944
- Christened: Sea Adder
- Commissioned: 12 October 1944
- Decommissioned: 14 June 1946
- Renamed: Gladwin/USS Gladwin, USS Hansford, Steel Apprentice.
- Honours and awards: Two battle stars for service in World War II.
- Fate: Scrapped May 1973
- Notes: WPS Hull No. 128.; MC Hull No. 1551.; Type C3-S-A2.; Sponsor: Mrs. Edward C. Cahill.

General characteristics
- Class & type: Bayfield-class attack transport
- Displacement: 8,100 tons, 16,100 tons fully loaded
- Length: 492 ft (150 m)
- Beam: 69 ft 6 in (21.18 m)
- Draught: 26 ft 6 in (8.08 m)
- Propulsion: General Electric geared turbine, 2 x Foster Wheeler D-type boilers, single propeller, designed shaft horsepower 8,500
- Speed: 18 knots
- Boats & landing craft carried: 12 x LCVP, 4 x LCM (Mk-6), 3 x LCP(L) (MK-IV)
- Capacity: 4,800 tons (180,500 cu. ft).
- Complement: Crew: 51 officers, 524 enlisted; Flag: 43 officers, 108 enlisted.; Troops: 80 officers, 1,146 enlisted
- Armament: 2 × single 5 inch/38 cal. dual purpose gun mounts, one fore and one aft.; 2 × twin 40mm AA gun mounts forward, port and starboard.; 2 × single 40 mm AA gun mounts.; 18 × single 20mm AA gun mounts.

USS Hansford (APA-106) was a Bayfield-class attack transport that served with the US Navy during World War II.

Originally christened Sea Adder, the vessel was launched 25 April 1944 as Gladwin by Western Pipe & Steel of San Francisco, under Maritime Commission contract. She was transferred to the Navy and renamed Hansford (after Hansford County, Texas) on 25 August, and commissioned on 12 October 1944.

== Operational history ==
After shakedown off San Pedro, California, Hansford got underway for Pearl Harbor 25 November 1944 and unloaded passengers and cargo there on 2 December. In the Hawaiian Islands, she undertook an intensive training program emphasizing landing exercises during daylight and maneuvering in formation at night. On 28 December she embarked the 1st Battalion Landing Team, 27th Regiment, 5th Division, U.S. Marines who joined her crew in amphibious training as they made ready for combat.

=== Casualties at Iwo Jima ===
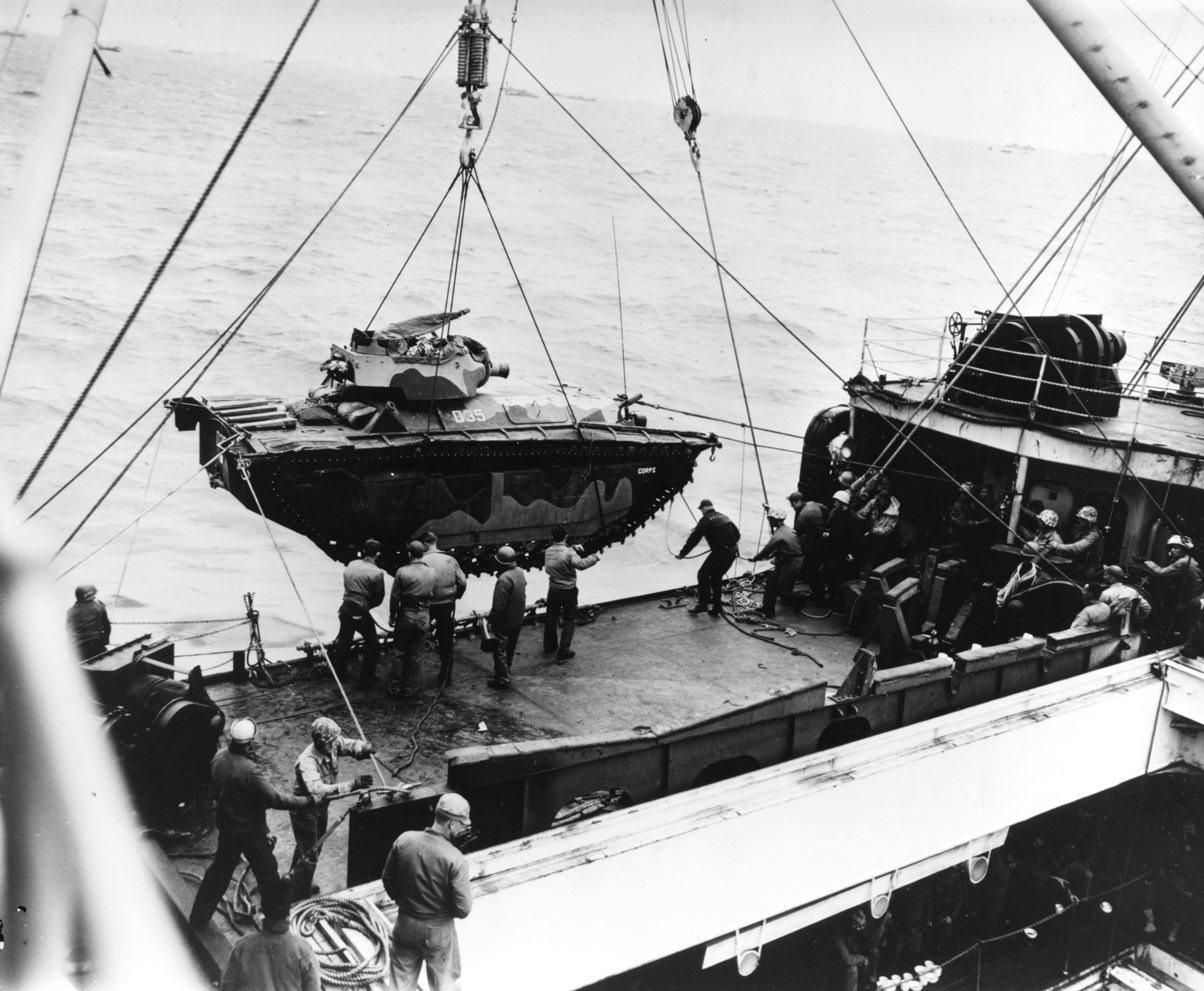
An LVT(A)-4 is hoisted from Hansford off Iwo Jima.

On 27 January 1945, Hansford sailed for Saipan, the staging area for the invasion of Iwo Jima, next step in America's seaborne thrust across the Pacific. After final rehearsal at Saipan, she sortied 16 February 1945 with Task Force 51. The initial assault waves which stormed the beaches of Iwo Jima 19 February included units from Hansford. She continued to land troops and equipment through 25 February. Although she often closed to within 1,000 yards of land, Hansford managed to escape the enemy shells which landed nearby. However, four of her boats, two LCVP's and two LCM's were lost during the operation, and her beach party, which was ashore from 19 February through 22 February, suffered 17 casualties including one officer and three enlisted men killed and one bluejacket missing. Three members of the boat group were wounded.

Each day while she was anchored off Iwo Jima, Hansford embarked and cared for casualties who were brought on board from the beaches. On the afternoon of 25 February, she sailed for Saipan. Upon arrival there on 28 February, she transferred 127 casualties to an Army hospital.

Hansford departed for Tulagi, Solomon Islands, 5 March 1945, whereupon arrival 12 March, she replaced the boats lost at Iwo Jima. The next day she sailed for the New Hebrides, anchoring in Segond Channel, Espiritu Santo Island, 15 March to embark the 2d Battalion Landing Team, 105th Regiment, 27th Infantry Division. While at Espiritu Santo, Hansford readied herself for further combat. She got underway for Ulithi atoll, the staging area for the invasion of Okinawa, 25 March.

=== Okinawa ===
Hansford sortied to the Ryukyus 4 April to take part in the follow-up phases of the vast Okinawa operation, largest invasion of the Pacific War. After a passage made difficult by three submarine contacts and encounters with numerous floating mines, her task group anchored in Kerama Retto 9 April 1945. The next day she steamed to the Hagushi beaches at Okinawa, where she landed her troops and cargo, and embarked casualties. Hansford's crew often sighted enemy planes which raided the area 20 times during the week she was off Okinawa, but she only opened fire once when an enemy plane passed close aboard at an extremely low altitude. The ship's company suffered their only casualty when the barrel of a 20 mm. gun exploded.

Hansford departed Okinawa with 51 casualties on board 16 April and transferred them to an Army hospital upon her arrival Saipan 20 April. The next day she got underway for Ulithi where she anchored 23 April for a month of training for future operations against the Japanese home islands. She then proceeded to the Philippines arriving San Pedro Bay, Leyte Gulf, 27 May, to continue preparations for invasion.

=== After hostilities ===
The day after the Japanese capitulated, Hansford embarked Commander Amphibious Group 12, Rear Admiral J. L. Hall, and his staff of 62 officers and 218 bluejackets. On 19 August key Army units came on board at Leyte for passage to occupation duty in Japan. She got underway for Tokyo Bay on 25 August, returned to Subic Bay that night because of typhoon, and on 27 August again sailed for Japan. Her formation entered Tokyo Bay early in the watch and passed battleship Missouri as the surrender ceremonies ending the war took place. The next day Hansford's occupation troops and cargo debarked at Yokohama. During the ensuing weeks at Yokohama, Hansford was a center of much activity since Admiral Hall, now serving as Port Director, was embarked. Her duties included quartering liberated Allied prisoners.

=== Operation Magic Carpet ===
Assigned to Operation Magic Carpet 13 October, Hansford sailed with 79 officers and 1,320 enlisted passengers whom she debarked in San Pedro 26 October. After repairs in dry dock, she returned to Nagoya, Japan, 4 December and got underway for Seattle, Washington, with another load of troops 7 December. The day after her arrival back in Japan, she was released from "Magic Carpet" duty, and sailed for the United States. Subsequently, Hansford sailed via the Panama Canal to Norfolk, Virginia. Arriving on 2 May 1946, she decommissioned there 14 June 1946.

== Commercial service ==
Hansford was redelivered to the Maritime Commission and sold 20 May 1947 to Isthmian Lines, who registered her in New York and renamed her Steel Apprentice. The vessel operated in the service of Isthmian from 1949 until 1969.

On 20 October 1953, navigating in thick fog and without operable radar, the Steel Apprentice struck Elbow of Cross Ledge Light head-on, knocking most of the lighthouse into the Delaware Bay.

Steel Apprentice was scrapped at Kaohsiung, Taiwan in May 1973.

== Crew ==
The surviving members of the WWII crew of the USS Hansford met for an annual reunion for decades. The last known survivor was Stanley B. Holzhauer who died on 16 October 2019. His service record on the Hansford is noted with a plaque at the National Museum of the Pacific War in Fredericksburg, Texas.

== See also ==
- Elbow of Cross Ledge Light

== Footnotes ==
The ship is listed in Jan 1944 Marine Muster reports as USS Hansford
