= Southern State Correctional Facility (New Jersey) =

Former prison in New Jersey, United States

Coordinates: 39.217051°N 74.923753°W

- Interactive map of Southern State Correctional Facility
- Location: 4295 Route 47 Delmont, New Jersey
- Status: Closed
- Capacity: 2000
- Opened: 1983
- Closed: 2022
- Managed by: New Jersey Department of Corrections

Southern State Correctional Facility (SSCF) was a prison for men located in Delmont, Maurice River Township, New Jersey, United States. It was a part of the New Jersey Department of Corrections. It was adjacent to Bayside State Prison.

Its operations began in 1983. Its buildings consisted of prefabricated units. Prisoners lived in dormitory housing as opposed to individual cells. It closed in 2022.
