= Cross Ledge Light =

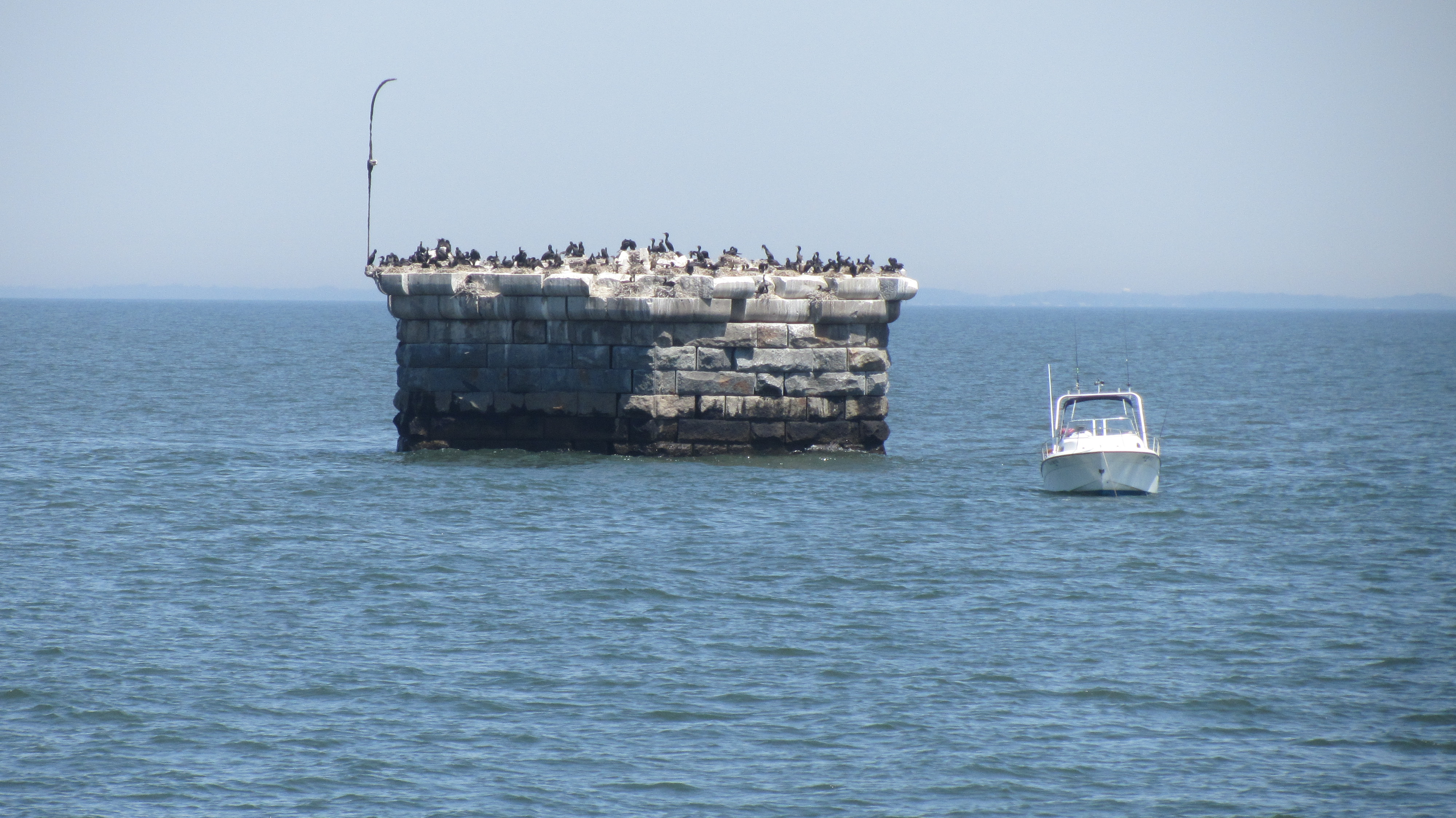
- Pier upon which the lighthouse stood
- Location: middle Delaware Bay
- Coordinates: 39.2040°N 75.2307°W

Tower
- Constructed: 1875
- Foundation: Granite pier
- Construction: Wood frame
- Shape: octagonal house with lantern on top

Light
- Deactivated: 1910
- Focal height: 58 feet (18 m)
- Lens: Fourth order Fresnel lens

The Cross Ledge Light was a lighthouse on the north side of the ship channel in Delaware Bay off of Cumberland County, New Jersey on the East Coast of the United States, southwest of Egg Island Point. It was replaced by the Elbow of Cross Ledge Light and the Miah Maull Shoal Light in the early 1900s and razed by the United States Coast Guard in 1962.

== History ==
Cross Ledge is part of a long system of shoals which delimits the northern boundary of the channel through Delaware Bay. A lightship was placed here beginning in 1823, but the Lighthouse Board, encouraged by the success of the Brandywine Shoal Light further down the bay, decided to construct a screw-pile lighthouse on the shoal. Construction began in 1856 but was interrupted the following winter by floating ice, which destroyed the entire structure. The board reconsidered, and the lightship remained on station.

The Lighthouse Board remained convinced that a permanent light was needed at the spot, and in 1873 succeeded in getting Congress to appropriate funds. Construction began the following year and was completed in 1875. Cross Ledge Light was unlike any other light in the area. It sat upon a hexagonal pier constructed of granite blocks, upon which sat an octagonal two story Second Empire frame house with the lantern at the crown of its mansard roof. A fourth-order Fresnel lens was installed. Before the house could be completed, the lightship, having taken refuge behind the Delaware Breakwater, was nonetheless dragged out to sea by ice in February 1875; it was able to resume station until the light was completed, however.

The light survived the years without serious incident, though much riprap was placed about it over the years to protect it from the ice. In the end, however, it was made obsolete by the construction of new lights closer to the shipping channel. The activation of the Elbow of Cross Ledge Light in 1910 marked the same shoal more effectively, and the Cross Ledge Light was abandoned in the same year.

The house remained intact over the years, and during World War II it was used as a target during practice bombing runs. Eventually the coast guard burned what remained in 1962, leaving the pier intact. Ironically, there is no beacon or other aid to navigation on the ruins, so that it is marked as a hazard on nautical charts, labelled "ABAND LH (ruins)".
