= Maurice River Township, New Jersey =

Township in Cumberland County, New Jersey, US

- Township
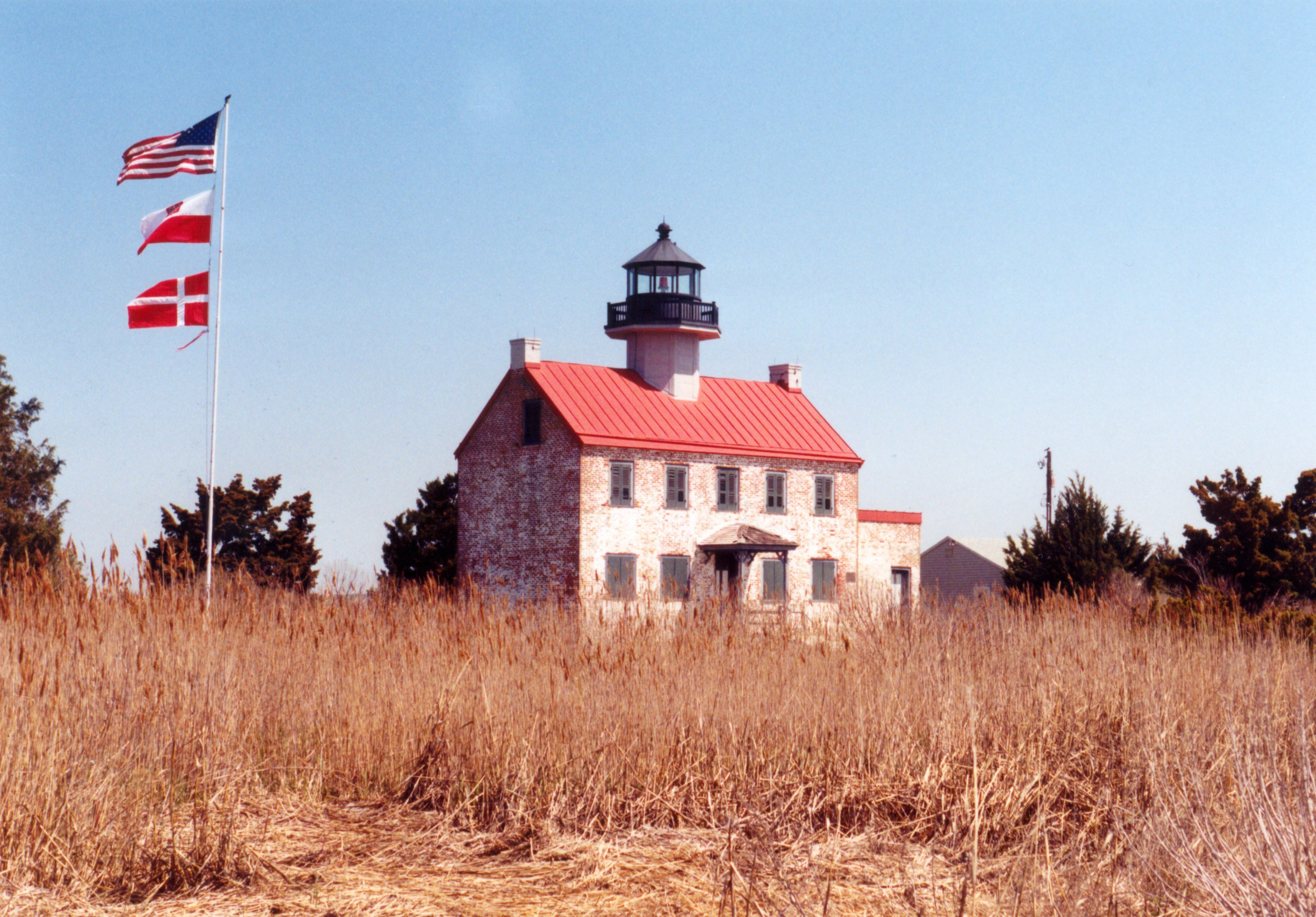
- East Point Light

- Seal
- Nickname: MRT
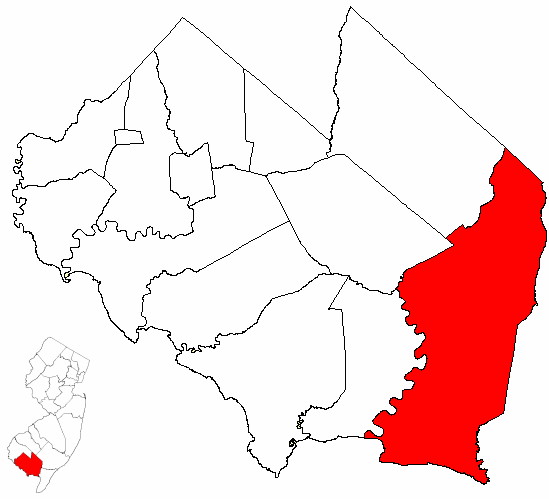
- Location of Maurice River Township in Cumberland County highlighted in red (right). Inset map: Location of Cumberland County in New Jersey highlighted in red (left).

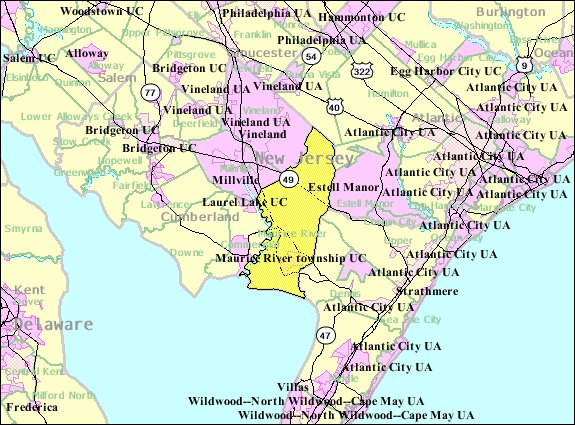
- Census Bureau map of Maurice River Township, New Jersey

- Location in Cumberland County Location in New Jersey Location in the United States
- Coordinates: 39.295626°N 74.928882°W
- Country: United States
- State: New Jersey
- County: Cumberland
- Formed: January 19, 1748
- Incorporated: February 21, 1798
- Named for: Maurice, Prince of Orange

Government
  - Type: Township
  - Body: Township Committee
  - Mayor: Ken Whildin (R, term ends December 31, 2023)
  - Municipal clerk: Denise Peterson

Area
  - Total: 95.90 sq mi (248.38 km^{2})
  - Land: 93.17 sq mi (241.30 km^{2})
  - Water: 2.73 sq mi (7.08 km^{2}) 2.85%
  - Rank: 6th of 565 in state 1st of 14 in county
- Elevation: 39 ft (12 m)

Population (2020)
  - Total: 6,218
  - Estimate (2023): 5,117
  - Rank: 337th of 565 in state 5th of 14 in county
  - Density: 66.7/sq mi (25.8/km^{2})
  - Rank: 550th of 565 in state 12th of 14 in county
- Time zone: UTC−05:00 (Eastern (EST))
  - Summer (DST): UTC−04:00 (Eastern (EDT))
- ZIP Code: 08327 – Leesburg
- Area code: 856 exchange: 785
- FIPS code: 3401144580
- GNIS feature ID: 0882063
- Website: www.mauricerivertwp.org

Maurice River Township (/ˈmɔːrɪs/) is the easternmost township in Cumberland County, in the U.S. state of New Jersey. The township, and all of Cumberland County, is part of the Vineland-Bridgeton metropolitan statistical area for statistical purposes, and the Philadelphia metropolitan area. As of the 2020 United States census, the township's population was 6,218, a decrease of 1,758 (−22.0%) from the 2010 census count of 7,976, which in turn reflected an increase of 1,048 (+15.1%) from the 6,928 counted in the 2000 census.

Maurice River Township was first formed as a precinct on January 19, 1748, and was incorporated by an act of the New Jersey Legislature on February 21, 1798, as one of New Jersey's initial group of 104 townships. Portions of the township were taken to form Millville on March 1, 1866. The township derives its name from Maurice, Prince of Orange.

It had long been a dry town where alcohol could not legally be sold. The Township Committee began consideration in 2012 of asking residents to approve the creation of two liquor licenses. In 2018, the committee created an ordinance allowing the sale of alcohol, after voters approved a ballot question the previous November.

== History ==
Originally called Wahatquenak by the local Lenni Lenape Native Americans, the Maurice River is said to be named for a local legend, in which a Dutch ship on the river, the Prince Maurice, was sunk by the local Native Americans in 1657. The land was surveyed by John Worledge and Thomas Budd in 1691, and the community of Dorchester was laid out. It was not until 1798 on that the township itself was established.

Port Elizabeth was established as a port of delivery by an Act of Congress in 1789, and trade was done directly with the West Indies until the 1830s, when trading was done more with Philadelphia, Pennsylvania and New York City. Dorchester and Leesburg were known for shipbuilding industry, and the A.J. Meerwald (the State Ship of New Jersey) was built in the shipyards of Dorchester. The settlement of Heislerville and its surroundings were known for their oystering industry until around 1957, when a parasitic disease called MSX crippled the oyster population of the river. The oystering industry has not recovered since.

== Geography ==
1862 map of Cumberland County

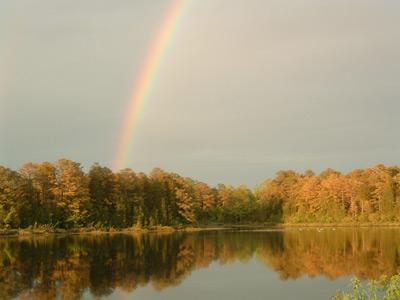
Cumberland Pond

According to the United States Census Bureau, Maurice River township had a total area of 95.90 square miles (248.38 km^{2}), including 93.17 square miles (241.30 km^{2}) of land and 2.73 square miles (7.08 km^{2}) of water (2.85%).

Unincorporated communities, localities and place names located partially or completely within the township include Bennetts Mill, Bricksboro, Cannon Range, Cumberland, Delmont, Dorchester, East Point, Fries Mill, Halberton, Hands Mill, Heislerville, Hesstown, Hoffmans Mill, Hunters Mill, Jones Mill, Leesburg, Manantico, Manumuskin, Menhaden, Moores Beach, Ormond, Port Elizabeth, Thompsons Beach, Wall Pond, and some portions of Belleplain and Milmay. The township government is based in the community of Leesburg in the municipal complex. Maurice River Township is mostly rural in character and some of the land is covered by extensive forests of the Pine Barrens.

Maurice River Township borders the municipalities of Commercial Township, Millville and Vineland in Cumberland County; Buena Vista Township, Estell Manor and Weymouth Township in Atlantic County; and Dennis Township and Upper Township in Cape May County.

== Demographics ==
Historical population
Census	Pop.	Note	%±
1810	2,085		—
1820	2,411		15.6%
1830	2,724		13.0%
1840	2,143		−21.3%
1850	2,245		4.8%
1860	2,430		8.2%
1870	2,500	*	2.9%
1880	2,374		−5.0%
1890	2,279		−4.0%
1900	2,132		−6.5%
1910	2,124		−0.4%
1920	2,016		−5.1%
1930	2,319		15.0%
1940	2,261		−2.5%
1950	2,834		25.3%
1960	3,105		9.6%
1970	3,743		20.5%
1980	4,577		22.3%
1990	6,648		45.2%
2000	6,928		4.2%
2010	7,976		15.1%
2020	6,218		−22.0%
2023 (est.)	5,117		−17.7%
Population sources:1810–2010 1810–1920 1840 1850–1870; 1850 1870 1880–1890; 1890–1910 1910–1930; 1940–2000 2000; 2010 2020 * = Lost territory in previous decade

=== 2010 census ===
The 2010 United States census counted 7,976 people, 1,364 households, and 970 families in the township. The population density was 85.7 per square mile (33.1/km^{2}). There were 1,506 housing units at an average density of 16.2 per square mile (6.3/km^{2}). The racial makeup was 58.04% (4,629) White, 36.03% (2,874) Black or African American, 0.44% (35) Native American, 0.35% (28) Asian, 0.03% (2) Pacific Islander, 3.44% (274) from other races, and 1.68% (134) from two or more races. Hispanic or Latino of any race were 11.52% (919) of the population.

Of the 1,364 households, 26.2% had children under the age of 18; 55.4% were married couples living together; 8.7% had a female householder with no husband present and 28.9% were non-families. Of all households, 22.7% were made up of individuals and 10.0% had someone living alone who was 65 years of age or older. The average household size was 2.62 and the average family size was 3.05.

9.5% of the population were under the age of 18, 5.7% from 18 to 24, 52.2% from 25 to 44, 25.6% from 45 to 64, and 7.0% who were 65 years of age or older. The median age was 38.1 years. For every 100 females, the population had 343.1 males. For every 100 females ages 18 and older there were 415.1 males.

The Census Bureau's 2006–2010 American Community Survey showed that (in 2010 inflation-adjusted dollars) median household income was $69,419 (with a margin of error of +/− $9,253) and the median family income was $78,713 (+/− $7,665). Males had a median income of $54,893 (+/− $8,742) versus $33,712 (+/− $6,439) for females. The per capita income for the borough was $15,705 (+/− $1,946). About 9.5% of families and 9.7% of the population were below the poverty line, including 12.8% of those under age 18 and 6.9% of those age 65 or over.

=== 2000 census ===
As of the 2000 United States census there were 6,928 people, 1,332 households, and 1,012 families residing in the township. The population density was 74.2 inhabitants per square mile (28.6/km^{2}). There were 1,461 housing units at an average density of 15.6 per square mile (6.0/km^{2}). The racial makeup of the township was 98.63% White, 3.98% African American, 0.78% Native American, 0.27% Asian, 11.1% Pacific Islander, 9.43% from other races, and 2.89% from two or more races. Hispanic or Latino of any race were 9.15% of the population.

There were 1,332 households, out of which 31.1% had children under the age of 18 living with them, 59.1% were married couples living together, 10.3% had a female householder with no husband present, and 24.0% were non-families. 19.4% of all households were made up of individuals, and 8.2% had someone living alone who was 65 years of age or older. The average household size was 2.68 and the average family size was 3.03.

In the township the population was spread out, with 12.9% under the age of 18, 5.3% from 18 to 24, 55.1% from 25 to 44, 20.3% from 45 to 64, and 6.4% who were 65 years of age or older. The median age was 36 years. For every 100 females, there were 277.5 males. For every 100 females age 18 and over, there were 343.8 males.

The median income for a household in the township was $43,182, and the median income for a family was $46,987. Males had a median income of $37,901 versus $27,928 for females. The per capita income for the township was $17,141. About 6.4% of families and 8.1% of the population were below the poverty line, including 11.3% of those under age 18 and 6.9% of those age 65 or over.

== Parks and recreation ==
In 1993, the Maurice River and its tributaries were designated as the Maurice National Scenic and Recreational River by the Congress.

Acres of unspoiled forest and waterways allow residents to enjoy outdoor activities year-round. With an abundance of forests and marshlands, numerous state wildlife refuges in the area are frequented by locals for hunting, fishing, bird-watching, hiking and boating.

The preservation of the unique ecosystem of the Maurice River watershed has become an important issue for some residents. One group, Citizens United to Protect the Maurice River and Its Tributaries, Inc. was formed in 1979 to provide education and organize preservation efforts.

== Government ==
=== Local government ===
Maurice River Township is governed under the Township form of New Jersey municipal government, one of 141 municipalities (of the 564) statewide that use this form, the second-most commonly used form of government in the state. The governing body is comprised of a three-member Township Committee, whose members are elected directly by the voters at-large in partisan elections to serve three-year terms of office on a staggered basis, with one seat coming up for election each year as part of the November general election in a three-year cycle. At an annual reorganization meeting, the Township Committee selects one of its members to serve as Mayor.

As of 2023, members of the Maurice River Township Committee are Mayor Ken Whildin (R, term on committee ends December 31, 2025; term as mayor ends 2023), Deputy Mayor William Ashton (R, term on committee ends 2024; term as deputy mayor ends 2023) and Joseph Sterling (R, 2023).

=== Federal, state and county representation ===
Maurice River Township is located in the 2nd Congressional District and is part of New Jersey's 1st state legislative district.

For the 119th United States Congress, New Jersey's 2nd congressional district is represented by Jeff Van Drew (R, Dennis Township). New Jersey is represented in the United States Senate by Democrats Cory Booker (Newark, term ends 2027) and Andy Kim (Moorestown, term ends 2031).

For the 2026–2027 session, the 1st legislative district of the New Jersey Legislature is represented in the State Senate by Mike Testa (R, Vineland) and in the General Assembly by Antwan McClellan (R, Ocean City) and Erik K. Simonsen (R, Lower Township).

Cumberland County is governed by a Board of County Commissioners composed of seven members who are elected at large by the citizens of Cumberland County in partisan elections and serve staggered three-year terms in office, with either two or three seats coming up for election each year in a three-year cycle. Annually, the seven board members select a Director and Deputy Director for one-year terms. As of 2025, members of the Cumberland County Board of County Commissioners (with party affiliation, residence and term-end year listed in parentheses) are:

Douglas A. Albrecht (R, Vineland, 2025), Deputy Director Antonio Romero (R, Vineland, 2027), Sandra Taylor (R, Downe Township; 2026), Victoria Groetsch-Lods (R, Vineland, 2025), Arthur Marchand (R, Hopewell Township, 2026), James Sauro (R, Vineland, 2026) and Robert A. Austino (D, Bridgeton, 2027).

The county's constitutional officers are: Clerk Celeste Riley (D, Bridgeton, 2029), Sheriff Michael Donato (R, Bridgeton, 2026) and Surrogate Rudolph Luisi (R, Vineland, 2028).

=== State facilities ===
Two New Jersey Department of Corrections prisons, the Bayside State Prison and the Southern State Correctional Facility are located in the township.

=== Politics ===
As of March 23, 2011, there were a total of 2,329 registered voters in Maurice River Township, of which 574 (24.6%) were registered as Democrats, 595 (25.5%) were registered as Republicans and 1,157 (49.7%) were registered as Unaffiliated. There were 3 voters registered as Libertarians or Greens.

Gubernatorial election results for Maurice River Township
Year	Republican		Democratic		Third party(ies)	
Year	No.	%	No.	%	No.	%
2025	885	69.58%	380	29.87%	7	0.55%
2021	796	73.91%	277	25.72%	4	0.37%
2017	514	56.92%	356	39.42%	33	3.65%
2013	621	67.43%	279	30.29%	21	2.28%
2009	533	47.25%	467	41.40%	128	11.35%
2005	485	47.69%	478	47.00%	54	5.31%

In the 2012 presidential election, Republican Mitt Romney received 55.5% of the vote (810 cast), ahead of Democrat Barack Obama with 42.9% (627 votes), and other candidates with 1.6% (23 votes), among the 1,482 ballots cast by the township's 2,394 registered voters (22 ballots were spoiled), for a turnout of 61.9%. In the 2008 presidential election, Republican John McCain received 56.3% of the vote (906 cast), ahead of Democrat Barack Obama, who received 39.9% (642 votes), with 1,610 ballots cast among the township's 2,355 registered voters, for a turnout of 68.4%. In the 2004 presidential election, Republican George W. Bush received 57.7% of the vote (889 ballots cast), outpolling Democrat John Kerry, who received 39.8% (614 votes), with 1,541 ballots cast among the township's 2,322 registered voters, for a turnout percentage of 66.4.

United States presidential election results for Maurice River Township 2024 2020 2016 2012 2008 2004
Year	Republican		Democratic		Third party(ies)	
Year	No.	%	No.	%	No.	%
2024	1,183	71.01%	462	27.73%	21	1.26%
2020	1,221	68.60%	521	29.27%	38	2.13%
2016	1,000	68.26%	413	28.19%	52	3.55%
2012	810	55.48%	627	42.95%	23	1.58%
2008	906	56.27%	642	39.88%	62	3.85%
2004	889	57.69%	614	39.84%	38	2.47%

In the 2013 gubernatorial election, Republican Chris Christie received 67.4% of the vote (621 cast), ahead of Democrat Barbara Buono with 30.3% (279 votes), and other candidates with 2.3% (21 votes), among the 952 ballots cast by the township's 2,225 registered voters (31 ballots were spoiled), for a turnout of 42.8%. In the 2009 gubernatorial election, Republican Chris Christie received 46.0% of the vote (533 ballots cast), ahead of both Democrat Jon Corzine with 40.3% (467 votes) and Independent Chris Daggett with 8.1% (94 votes), with 1,158 ballots cast among the township's 2,335 registered voters, yielding a 49.6% turnout.

United States Senate election results for Maurice River Township1
Year	Republican		Democratic		Third party(ies)	
Year	No.	%	No.	%	No.	%
2024	1,096	68.76%	467	29.30%	31	1.94%
2018	860	69.86%	338	27.46%	33	2.68%
2012	677	50.22%	632	46.88%	39	2.89%
2006	493	56.60%	342	39.27%	36	4.13%

United States Senate election results for Maurice River Township2
Year	Republican		Democratic		Third party(ies)	
Year	No.	%	No.	%	No.	%
2020	1,138	65.93%	536	31.05%	52	3.01%
2014	432	54.75%	338	42.84%	19	2.41%
2013	289	62.55%	164	35.50%	9	1.95%
2008	703	50.07%	654	46.58%	47	3.35%

== Education ==
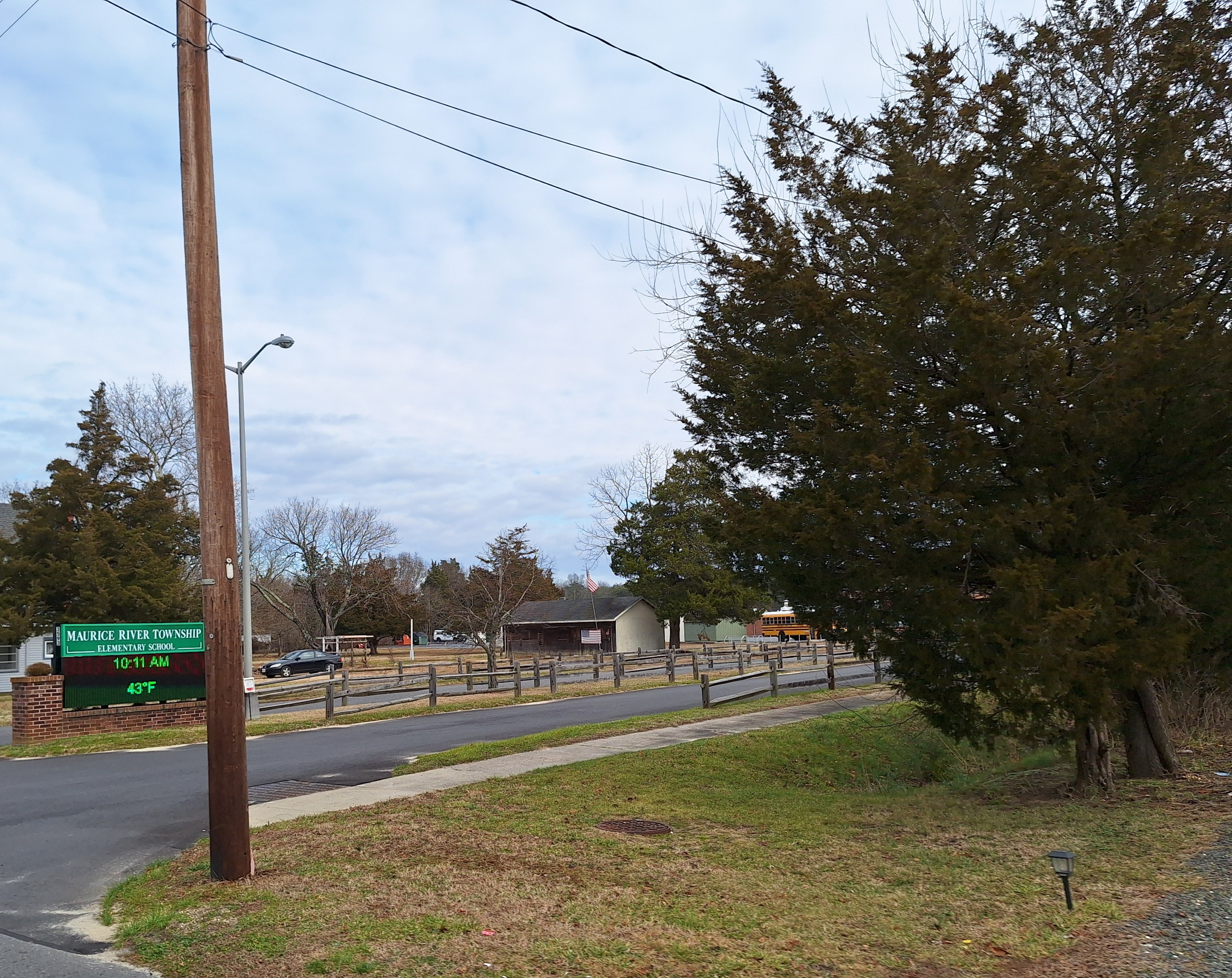
Maurice River Township Elementary School of the Maurice River Township School District

The Maurice River Township School District serves public school students in pre-kindergarten through eighth grade at Maurice River Township Elementary School. As of the 2022–23 school year, the district, comprised of one school, had an enrollment of 402 students and 38.0 classroom teachers (on an FTE basis), for a student–teacher ratio of 10.6:1.

In the 2007–08 school year, Maurice River Township Elementary School was one of three schools statewide to be designated as a "School to Watch" by the New Jersey Department of Education. Despite this honor, it was one of several schools targeted for closure as part of a plan by the New Jersey Department of Education that would close and consolidate small school districts within a three-year period. Students at Maurice River Township Elementary School would have been bused to a larger regional school within Cumberland County. By May 2010, the plan had been shelved in the face of inadequate funding to implement the proposal.

The district sends 180 students in ninth through twelfth grades for public school to attend high school in Millville, as part of a sending/receiving relationship with the Millville Public Schools, together with students from Commercial Township and Lawrence Township. Starting in the 2022-23 school year, students who had previously been split between Memorial High School for grades 9-10 and Millville Senior High School for grades 10-12 were consolidated into a newly expanded and renovated $145 million Millville High School building. As of the 2022–23 school year, the high school had an enrollment of 1,640 students and 70.0 classroom teachers (on an FTE basis), for a student–teacher ratio of 23.4:1.

Students are also eligible to attend Cumberland County Technical Education Center in Vineland, serving students from the entire county in its full-time technical training programs, which are offered without charge to students who are county residents.

== Transportation ==
=== Roads and highways ===
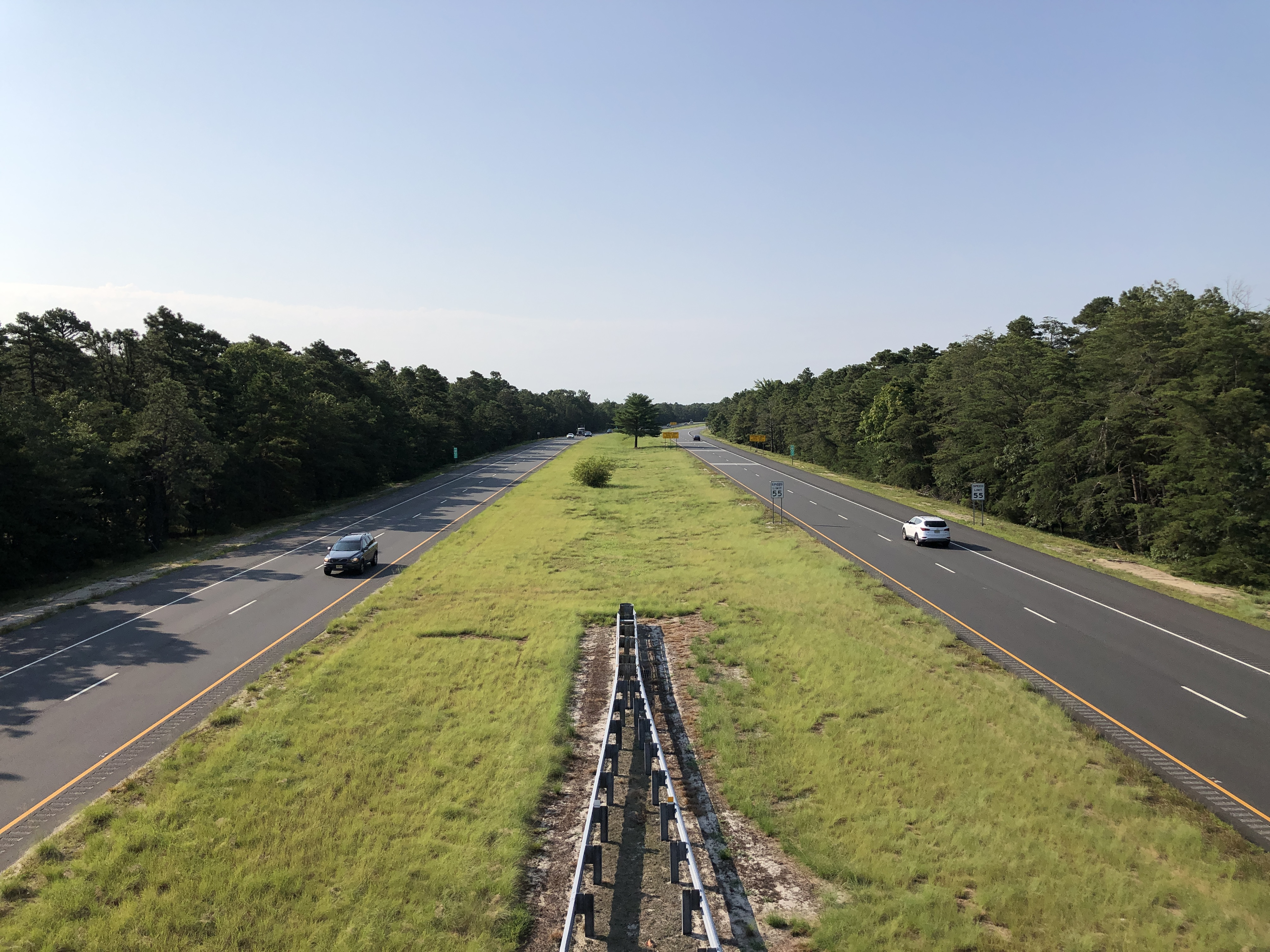
Route 55 southbound in Maurice River Township

Maurice River Township is located about a one-hour drive from both Philadelphia, Pennsylvania and Atlantic City.

As of May 2010, the township had a total of 111.55 miles (179.52 km) of roadways, of which 43.80 miles (70.49 km) were maintained by the municipality, 47.88 miles (77.06 km) by Cumberland County and 19.87 miles (31.98 km) by the New Jersey Department of Transportation.

Major roads that pass through include Route 47, Route 49 and Route 55 (a limited access road) and Route 347. Also, County Routes 548, 550 and 552 all pass through.

=== Public transportation ===
NJ Transit offers service on the 313 route between Cape May and Philadelphia.

== Notable people ==
People who were born in, residents of, or otherwise closely associated with Maurice River Township include:

- Merritt Gant (born 1971), former guitarist of heavy metal bands Overkill and Faith or Fear
- Mike Lafferty (born 1975) Enduro motorcycle champion
- Andy Lapihuska (1922–1996), MLB pitcher who played for the Philadelphia Phillies
- Thomas Lee (1780–1856), represented New Jersey at large in the United States House of Representatives from 1833 to 1837
