= Heislerville, New Jersey =

Populated place in Cumberland County, New Jersey, US

- Census-designated place
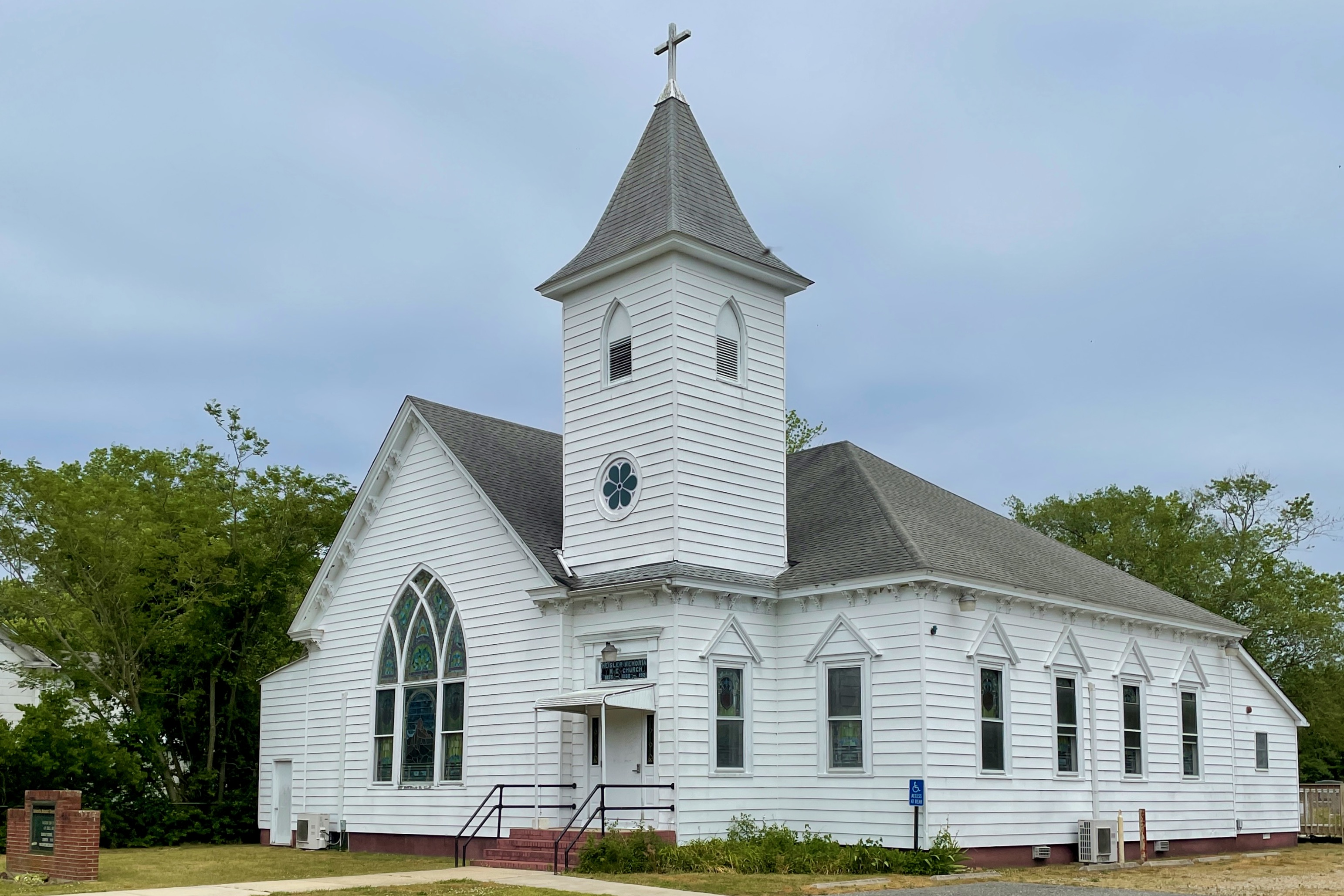
- Heislerville United Methodist Church

- Location in Cumberland County Location in New Jersey Location in the United States
- Coordinates: 39°13′23″N 74°59′33″W
- Country: United States
- State: New Jersey
- County: Cumberland
- Township: Maurice River

Area
  - Total: 0.72 sq mi (1.86 km^{2})
  - Land: 0.72 sq mi (1.86 km^{2})
  - Water: 0 sq mi (0.00 km^{2})
- Elevation: 10 ft (3.0 m)

Population (2020)
  - Total: 227
  - Density: 316.1/sq mi (122.03/km^{2})
- Time zone: UTC−05:00 (Eastern (EST))
  - Summer (DST): UTC−04:00 (Eastern (EDT))
- FIPS code: 34-30810
- GNIS feature ID: 877035

Heislerville is an unincorporated community and census-designated place (CDP) that is part of Maurice River Township in Cumberland County in the U.S. state of New Jersey. It was named after the Heisler family, prominent members of the Methodist Episcopal Church established here in 1828.

As of the 2020 census, Heislerville had a population of 227.

The community borders the Maurice River and Delaware Bay; bayshore areas are East Point and Thompson's Beach, now flooded by the state of New Jersey for use as a bird watch conservatory. The East Point Lighthouse was built in 1849, located on the northern side of Delaware Bay at the mouth of the circuitous Maurice River. The lighthouse is a restful place to fish or hike and is open a few days every year. It is still a working light house but is only operated remotely, having not been staffed for years. It was added to the National Register of Historic Places in 1995 for its significance in engineering, maritime history, and transportation.

Today, aside from truck gardens, small fishing operations, and a couple of marinas on state-leased land off Matt's Landing Road; the community has no shops or businesses. The major employer is the state of New Jersey, as Maurice River Township is home to three prisons; Bayside, South Woods, and Southern State. In addition to the Heislerville United Methodist Church, located within the community is the Heislerville Volunteer Fire Company.

== Demographics ==
Historical population
Census	Pop.	Note	%±
2020	227		—
U.S. Decennial Census

Heislerville was first listed as a census designated place in the 2020 U.S. census.

Heislerville CDP, New Jersey – Racial and ethnic composition Note: the US Census treats Hispanic/Latino as an ethnic category. This table excludes Latinos from the racial categories and assigns them to a separate category. Hispanics/Latinos may be of any race.
Race / Ethnicity (NH = Non-Hispanic)	Pop 2020	2020
White alone (NH)	218	96.04%
Black or African American alone (NH)	3	1.32%
Native American or Alaska Native alone (NH)	0	0.00%
Asian alone (NH)	0	0.00%
Native Hawaiian or Pacific Islander alone (NH)	0	0.00%
Other race alone (NH)	0	0.00%
Mixed race or Multiracial (NH)	2	0.88%
Hispanic or Latino (any race)	4	1.76%
Total	227	100.00%

Heislerville's population as of 2020 was 227, while the 2010 census showed a count of 451. There are approximately 200 housing units in its approximate nine-mile radius of which 8.17 square miles (21.2 km^{2}) is land and 0.02 square miles (0.052 km^{2}) is water.

== Education ==
Students are zoned to Maurice River Township School District.

== Gallery ==
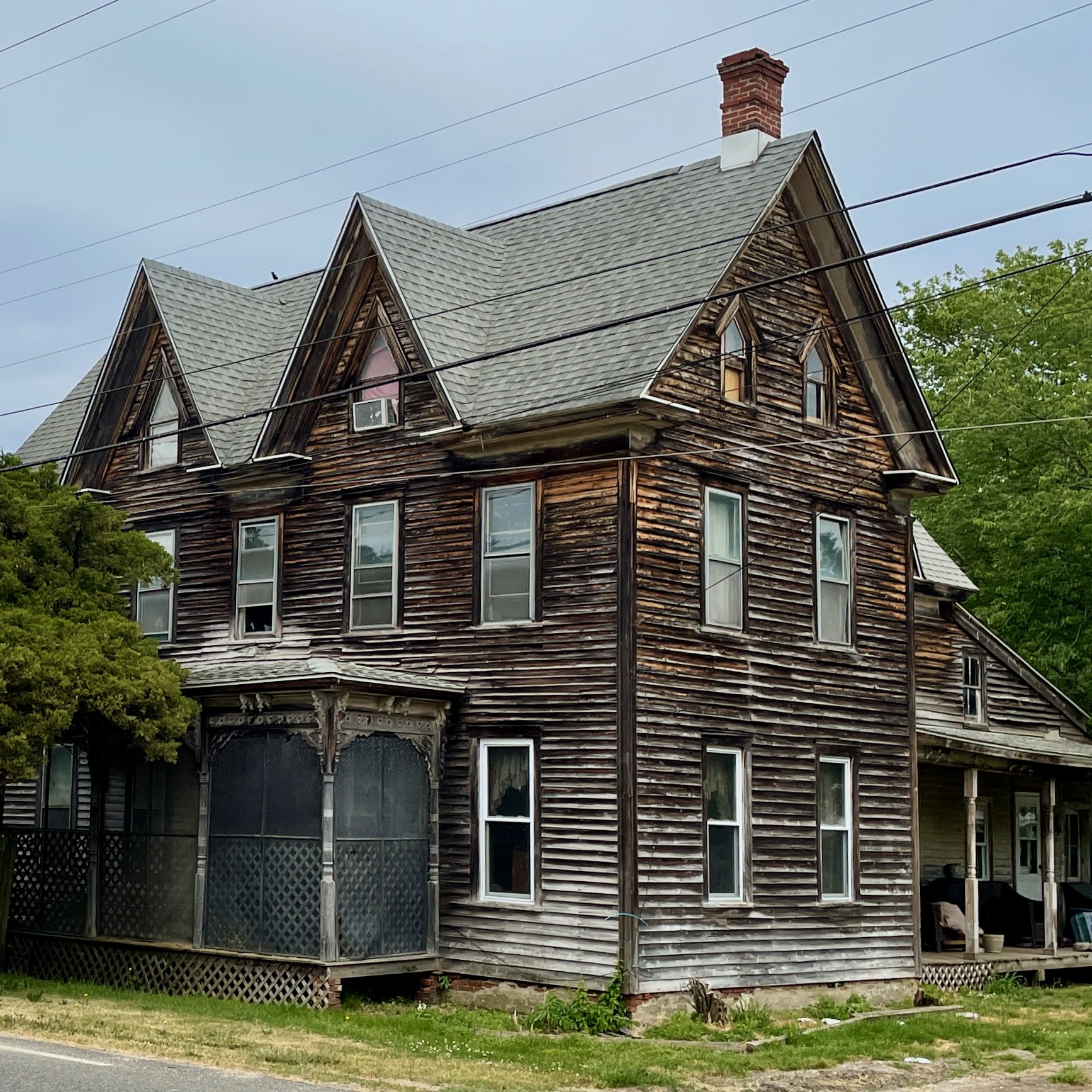
HABS documented house at Main Street and Glade Road

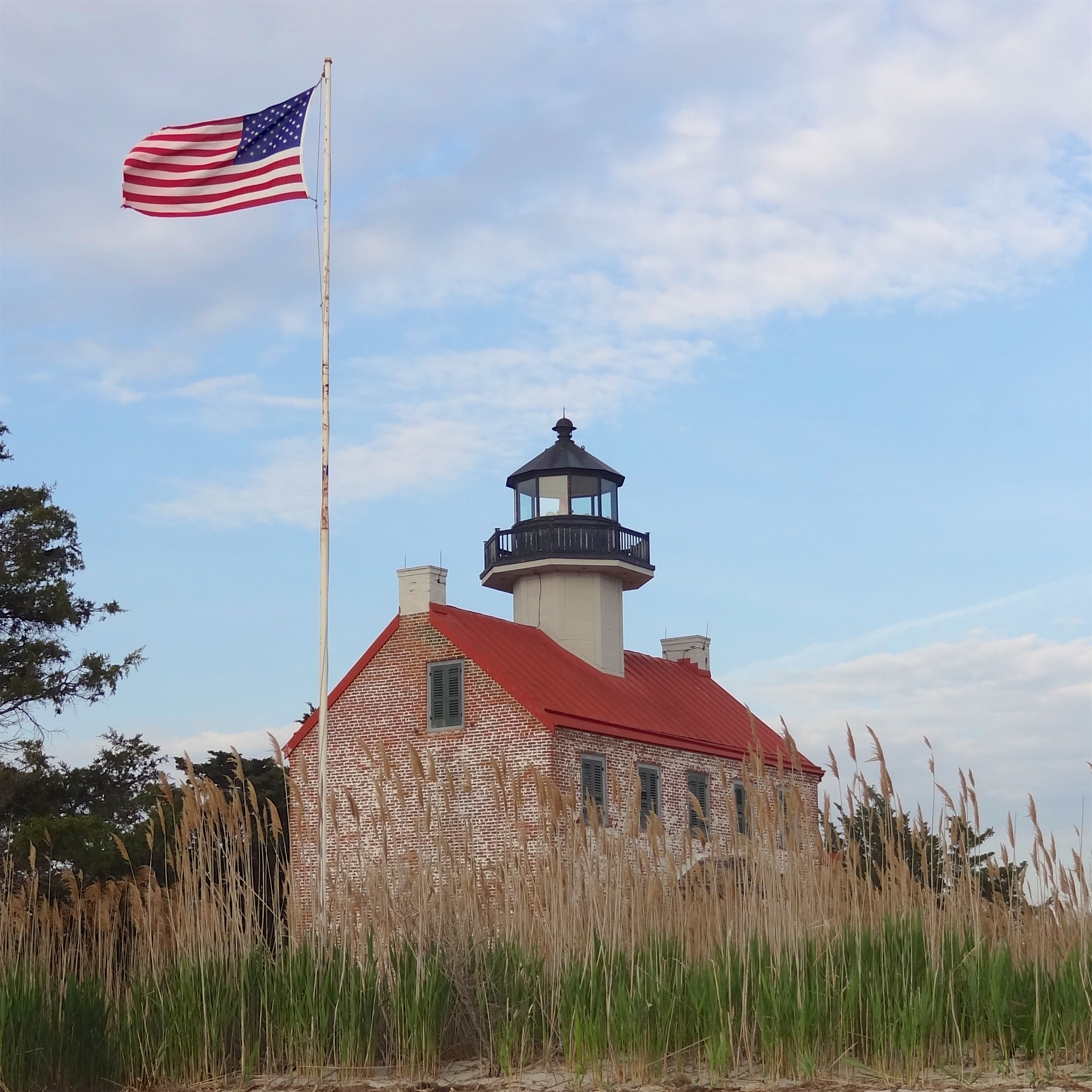
East Point Light
