= Elbow of Cross Ledge Light =

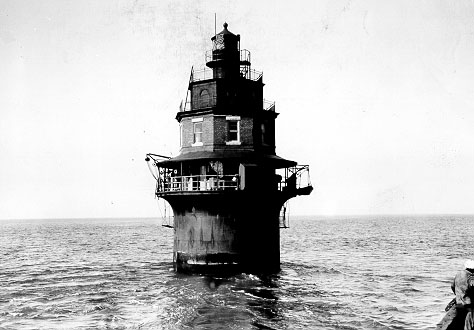
- Elbow of Cross Ledge Light (USCG)
- Location: middle Delaware Bay
- Coordinates: 39.1816°N 75.2683°W

Tower
- Constructed: 1910
- Foundation: Caisson
- Construction: Brick
- Automated: 1951
- Shape: octagonal house with lantern on top

Light
- First lit: 1954
- Deactivated: 1953
- Focal height: 61 feet (19 m)
- Lens: Fourth order Fresnel lens
- Characteristic: Iso W 6s

The Elbow of Cross Ledge Light was a lighthouse on the north side of the ship channel in Delaware Bay in Cumberland County, New Jersey, on the east coast of the United States, west of Egg Island Point. It was destroyed by a ship collision in 1953 and replaced by a skeleton tower on the same foundation.

== History ==
This light was built to replace the Cross Ledge Light, which stood somewhat to the south-east. A projection from Cross Ledge shoal forces a slight turn in the ship channel, and it was felt that light on this projection (the "elbow") would be more useful than the older light, which stood at some distance from the present channel.

Construction of the new light was considerably delayed from the first congressional appropriation in 1904. Advertisement for bids had to be repeated as there were no submissions in the first round. In addition, the setting and completion of the caisson were interrupted by a severe storm in September 1907 which drowned one worker and set a scow adrift with an inspector who was not located and rescued for two days. The first light was not exhibited until February 1910.

The light was struck glancing blows by passing ships several times over the years. A story on December 19, 1954, Philadelphia Evening Bulletin recalled that the keepers slept in life jackets for fear of having to abandon the station should it be struck. This precaution proved unnecessary, but only because damage from a storm in November 1951 had resulted in sufficiently serious damage that the light was automated, controlled by the keepers of the Miah Maull Shoal Light to the south. On October 20, 1953, however, the Isthmian Lines' ore freighter Steel Apprentice, navigating in thick fog and without operable radar, struck the light head-on, knocking most of the house into the bay. The coast guard removed the wreckage and erected a steel skeleton tower on the old foundation. This light remains in service.
