= East Point Light =

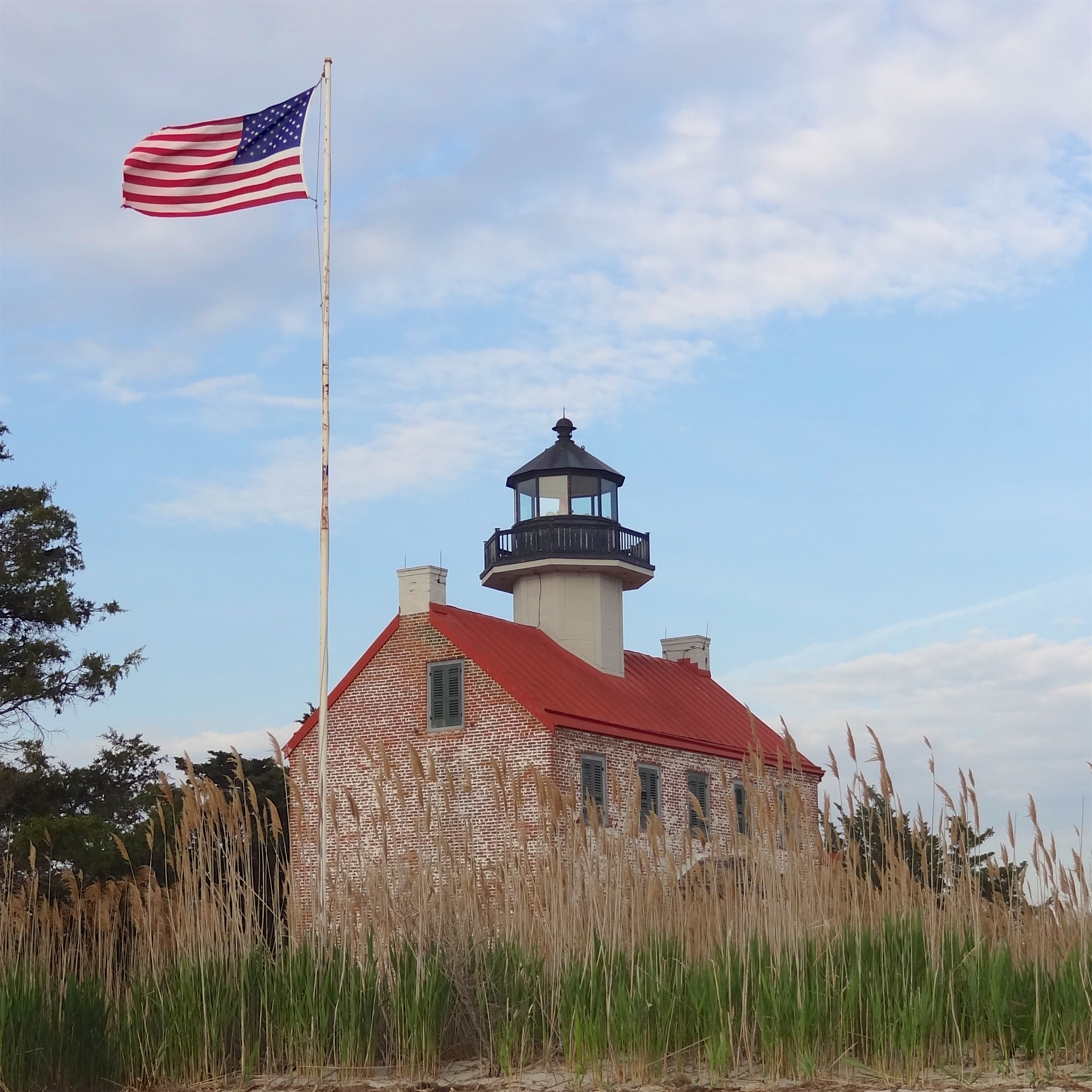
- East Point Light, 2014
- Location: Lighthouse Road, near the junction of East Point Road; Maurice River Township, New Jersey
- Coordinates: 39°11′45″N 75°1′38″W

Tower
- Constructed: 1849
- Foundation: Stone
- Construction: Brick
- Automated: 1911
- Height: 40 feet (12.2 m)
- Shape: Octagonal on roof of rectangular building
- Heritage: National Register of Historic Places listed place

Light
- First lit: 1849
- Deactivated: 1941–1980
- Focal height: 13 m (43 ft)
- Lens: Sixth order Fresnel lens
- Range: 9 nmi (17 km; 10 mi) (white), 7 nmi (13 km; 8.1 mi) (red)
- Characteristic: Iso W 6s
- Maurice River Lighthouse
- U.S. National Register of Historic Places
- New Jersey Register of Historic Places
- Area: 3.6 acres (1.5 ha)
- Architect: N. & S. Middleton
- NRHP reference No.: 95001047 (original); 15000763 (increase)
- NJRHP No.: 2801

Significant dates
- Added to NRHP: August 25, 1995
- Boundary increase: October 30, 2015
- Designated NJRHP: July 17, 1995

The East Point Light, known as the Maurice River Light before 1913, is a lighthouse located in Heislerville, New Jersey on the Delaware Bay at the mouth of the Maurice River in Maurice River Township, Cumberland County, New Jersey, United States. The lighthouse was built in 1849 and is the second oldest in New Jersey, with only the Sandy Hook Light, which was built in 1764, being older. The light was inactive from 1941 and was nearly destroyed by fire in 1971. The light was reinstated by the United States Coast Guard in 1980. Exterior restoration was completed in 1999.

It was added to the National Register of Historic Places on August 25, 1995 for its significance in engineering, maritime history, and transportation. It became part of the Maurice River Lighthouse and East Point Archeological District on October 30, 2015. The lighthouse was fully restored in 2017. The lighthouse is an active navigational aid and currently under the stewardship of the New Jersey Department of Environmental Protection.

== Status ==
The light is said to be critically endangered due to erosion. Although local governments routinely shore up the property's perimeter, using 3,000 pounds (1,400 kg) sand bags and bulldozers, the lighthouse is a mere 40 yards (37 m) from the shore. There was four times the beach as revealed by 1940 aerial photos. During storms the surf is 10 yards (9.1 m) from its front steps. A rally to save the lighthouse was held in the fall of 2018. Since then more sandbags have been added, paid for by the State of New Jersey and using the sandbags available the sandbag seawall was rebuilt by coordinated efforts of both the Maurice River Township and Cumberland County Road Departments. A geotube system is planned to be installed the summer of 2019 by the State of New Jersey to help hold the point and protect the lighthouse until more lasting measures can be taken. (Note: Even a temporary solution is estimated to cost $ 3 million. (Note: According to the National Oceanic and Atmospheric Administration, sea levels have risen markedly over the past century. In New Jersey seas rose 1.3 feet, and the pace has quickened in recent decades. According to Rutgers University professor Benjamin Horton, an expert on climate change, that is a quicker pace than the past 2,000 years combined.) The nearby beach berm was swept away by Hurricane Sandy and the foundation was under 21 inches (530 mm) of water. The lighthouse is said to be in dire peril, with solutions being explored by the U.S. Army Corps of Engineers.)

== See also ==
- List of lighthouses in New Jersey
- National Register of Historic Places listings in Cumberland County, New Jersey
