= Brandywine Shoal Light =

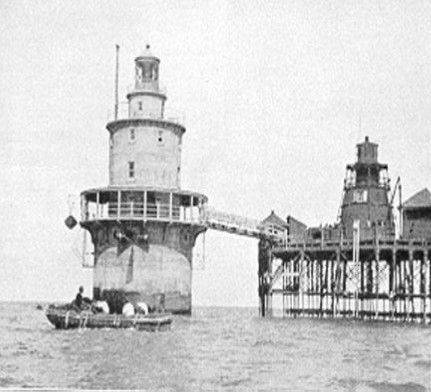
- Brandywine Shoals Light (undated USCG photo)
- Location: lower Delaware Bay
- Coordinates: 38.9864°N 75.1135°W

Tower
- Constructed: 1828 (1st light); 1850 (2nd light); 1914 (3rd light)
- Foundation: wood piles (1st light) screw-pile (2nd light) cast iron/concrete caisson (3rd light)
- Construction: cast iron (2nd light) reinforced concrete (3rd light)
- Automated: 1974
- Height: 14 m (46 ft)
- Shape: conical/cylindrical house with lantern on top (2nd and 3rd lights)
- Heritage: National Register of Historic Places listed place

Light
- First lit: 1914
- Focal height: 54 feet (16 m) (2nd light); 60 feet (18 m) (3rd light)
- Lens: third order Fresnel lens
- Range: 13 nautical miles (24 km; 15 mi)
- Characteristic: 10s flash
- Brandywine Shoal Lighthouse
- U.S. National Register of Historic Places
- New Jersey Register of Historic Places
- NRHP reference No.: 06000943
- NJRHP No.: 988

Significant dates
- Added to NRHP: January 8, 2007
- Designated NJRHP: August 2, 2006

The Brandywine Shoal Light is a lighthouse on the north side of the ship channel in Delaware Bay on the east coast of the United States, west of Cape May, Cape May County, New Jersey, United States. It was the site of the first screw-pile lighthouse in the United States.

== History ==
A lightship was stationed near the shoal starting in 1823; this ship, known as Lightship "N", lasted until 1859, despite an 1838 inspection report characterizing it as being in poor repair. It remained at this station until 1850, with one interruption. In 1827 the first attempt was made to place a fixed light on the shoal. A wood pile structure, it lasted barely a year before heavy seas tore it down. An abortive project, begun in 1835, to design a light on a stone pier at the site was cancelled when the cost proved prohibitive.

The construction of the Maplin Sands Lighthouse in 1838 attracted the attention of American lighthouse designers, who saw the screw-pile technology it introduced as means both to economy of construction and to the simplification of placing foundations in soft bottoms. Major Hartman Bache, who had devised the cancelled stone pier plan, was directed to try the new technique, and assisted by Lt. George Meade he initially constructed a conical iron structure resting on nine piles. This structure was first lit in 1850. It became evident that this was not adequate to resist moving ice, and more piles were sunk in a sort of fence around the light; over the next eight years, sixty-eight piles were placed around the light, and a wooden platform was laid across them. The lighthouse proper rose out of the center of the platform as a short tower.

This light was fitted with a third-order Fresnel lens in 1851, only the third American light to receive the innovation. It was used in a test by the then-nascent Lighthouse Board in which its light was compared with those of the Cape Henlopen and Cape May lights, both fitted with the reflector schemes typical of US lights of the day. The greater brightness of Brandywine Shoal's beacon, even though it was much further away from the test point than the other two, was a nail in the coffin for the reflector system, and the board quickly went about installing Fresnel lenses in all lighthouses upon assuming authority in 1852.

The light survived into the next century, but its cramped facilities and concerns about corrosion of the piles led the Lighthouse Board to obtain an appropriation to construct a caisson light at the site. This light, completed in 1914, featured a reinforced concrete superstructure on a cast iron and concrete caisson, resting upon wooden and precast concrete piles. The superstructure of the old light was removed, but the platform remained into the 1950s, used by the Navy for various purposes. In support of this, a small artificial harbor was constructed using a partial circle of riprap; it remains in place, though the last traces of the old light have since been removed.

The Fresnel lens was moved from the old light to the new when the latter was completed, and has since been transferred to the Tuckerton Seaport museum, where it is on public display. The light was automated in 1974, by which time it was the last staffed station on Delaware Bay. It continues to serve as an active aid to navigation. The lighthouse is listed on the National Register of Historic Places (reference number 06000943).

In June 2011, the General Services Administration made the Brandywine Shoal Light (along with 11 others) available at no cost to public organizations willing to preserve them.

== See also ==
- National Register of Historic Places listings in Cape May County, New Jersey
