= John Davis (American Civil War sailor) =

- Born: Cedarville, New Jersey
- Died: New York City, New York
- Military career
- Allegiance: United States of America
- Branch: United States Navy
- Rank: Quarter Gunner
- Unit: USS Valley City
- Awards: Medal of Honor

Quarter Gunner John Davis (died 17 November 1863) was an American sailor who fought in the American Civil War. Davis received the country's highest award for bravery during combat, the Medal of Honor, for his action aboard the USS Valley City on 10 February 1862. He was honored with the award on 3 April 1863.

== Biography ==
Davis was born in the Cedarville section of Lawrence Township, Cumberland County, New Jersey. He enlisted into the United States Navy from New Jersey. Davis died in the New York City Naval Hospital on 17 November 1863 (possibly due to his injuries) and was buried at an unknown location.

== Medal of Honor citation ==
Served on board the U.S.S. Valley City during action against rebel fort batteries and ships off Elizabeth City, N.C., on 10 February 1862. When a shell from the shore penetrated the side and passed through the magazine, exploding outside the screen on the berth deck, several powder division protecting bulkheads were torn to pieces and the forward part of the berth deck set on fire. Showing great presence of mind, Davis courageously covered a barrel of powder with his own body and prevented an explosion, while at the same time passing powder to provide the division on the upper deck while under fierce enemy fire.

== See also ==
- List of American Civil War Medal of Honor recipients: A–F
