= A. J. Meerwald =

American dredging oyster schooner

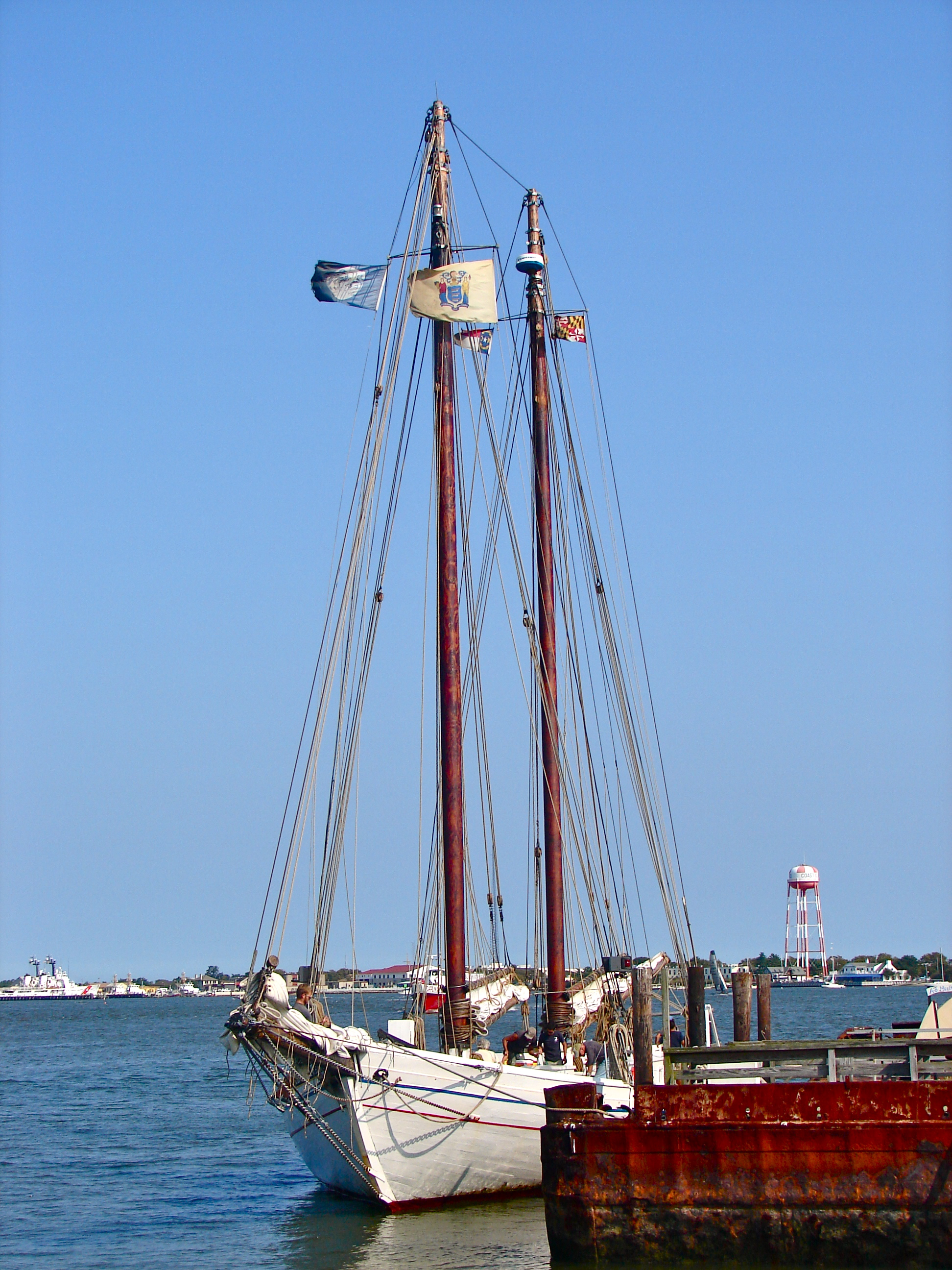

History

United States
- Owner: Bayshore Center at Bivalve
- Ordered: 1928
- Builder: Charles H. Stowman & Sons shipyard
- Acquired: 1989
- Status: Educational vessel

General characteristics
- Type: two-masted gaff schooner
- Tonnage: 57 tons
- Length: 85 ft (26 m) on deck
- Beam: 22 ft (6.7 m)
- Height: 70 ft (21 m)
- Draft: 6 ft (1.8 m)
- Propulsion: sail; auxiliary engine
- Sail plan: mainsail, foresail, large jib; sail area: 3,562 square feet (330.9 m^{2})
- Capacity: 44 passengers
- Notes: oak hull
- A. J. Meerwald
- U.S. National Register of Historic Places
- New Jersey Register of Historic Places
- Location within Cumberland County, New Jersey Location within New Jersey Location within the United States
- Location: 22 Miller Avenue on Maurice River, Commercial Township, New Jersey
- Coordinates: 39°14′5″N 75°1′50″W
- Area: less than 1-acre (4,000 m^{2})
- Architectural style: Delaware Bay oyster schooner
- NRHP reference No.: 95001256
- NJRHP No.: 1039

Significant dates
- Added to NRHP: November 7, 1995
- Designated NJRHP: July 17, 1995

A.J. Meerwald, later known as Clyde A. Phillips, is a restored dredging oyster schooner, whose home port is in the Bivalve section of Commercial Township in Cumberland County, New Jersey. The gaff-rigged schooner was added to the National Register of Historic Places on November 7, 1995, for her significance in architecture, commerce, and maritime history. She became the state tall ship in 1998. Today, A.J. Meerwald is used by the Bayshore Center at Bivalve for onboard educational programs in the Delaware Bay, and at other ports in the New Jersey, Pennsylvania, and Delaware region.

== History ==
On September 7, 1928, A.J. Meerwald was constructed and launched by Charles H. Stowman & Sons at the shipyard in Dorchester. She was one of hundreds of schooners built along South Jersey's Delaware Bay shore before the decline of the shipbuilding industry which coincided with the Great Depression. During World War II, she was commandeered under the War Powers Act and turned over to the U.S. Coast Guard for use as a fireboat. In 1947, she was returned to the Meerwald family, who then sold her to Clyde A. Phillips for use as an oyster dredge. In 1998, Governor Christine Todd Whitman proclaimed the schooner the "official tall ship" of New Jersey. The AJ Meerwald was originally built to be a sturdy and reliable ship that could withstand the rough conditions of the Delaware Bay. For many years, the ship was used for oyster dredging, a dangerous but lucrative activity that was common in the area. However, as the demand for oysters declined, the ship was eventually repurposed for other uses. During the prohibition era, the AJ Meerwald was used to smuggle alcohol, a risky but profitable activity that many ships engaged in. The ship was eventually retired from service and was in danger of being scrapped. However, a group of concerned citizens came together to save the ship and restore it to its former glory. Today, the AJ Meerwald is a school ship that offers tours and educational programs that teach students about the history and ecology of the Delaware Bay. The ship is an important resource for the state's educational system, and it plays a crucial role in helping students understand the importance of preserving the environment.The AJ Meerwald is a popular tourist attraction, drawing visitors from all over the world who are interested in learning about the ship's rich history. The ship is a living museum, and visitors can explore its decks and cabins to get a sense of what life was like on board a ship in the early 20th century. The ship is also used for special events, such as weddings and corporate events, and it is a unique and memorable venue for any occasion. The AJ Meerwald is an important part of New Jersey's maritime heritage, and it has played a significant role in shaping the state's history. From its humble beginnings as an oyster dredger to its role as a smuggler during prohibition, the ship has had many different roles over the years. Today, the ship is a living museum that offers visitors a chance to step back in time and learn about the history and ecology of the Delaware Bay.

== See also ==
- National Register of Historic Places listings in Cumberland County, New Jersey
- List of schooners
- List of museums in New Jersey
