= Centre Grove, New Jersey =

Populated place in Cumberland County, New Jersey, US

- Census-designated place
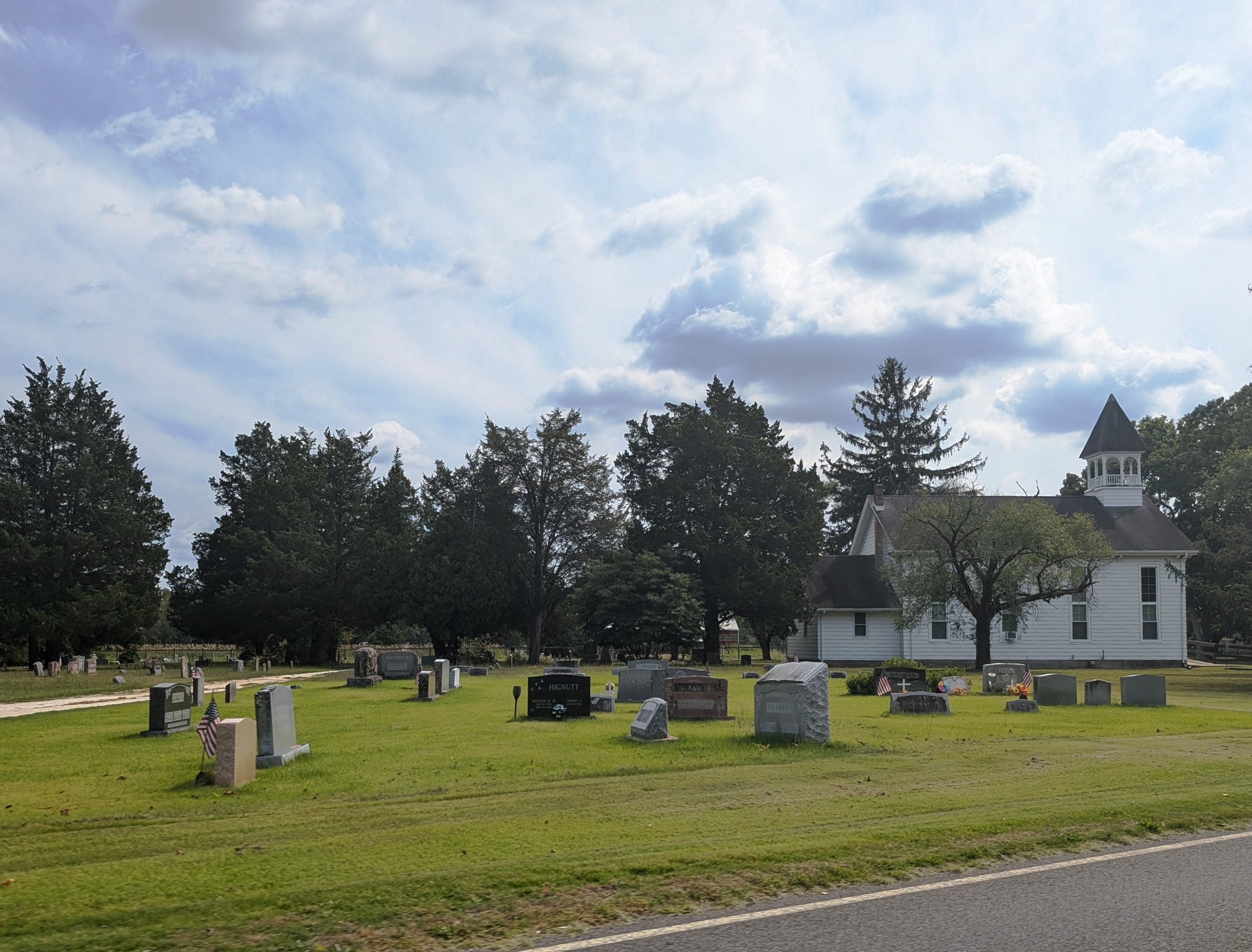
- Centre Grove United Methodist Church and cemetery

- Location in Cumberland County Location in New Jersey Location in the United States
- Coordinates: 39°22′5″N 75°8′14″W
- Country: United States
- State: New Jersey
- County: Cumberland
- Township: Lawrence

Area
  - Total: 7.03 sq mi (18.21 km^{2})
  - Land: 7.02 sq mi (18.19 km^{2})
  - Water: 0.0077 sq mi (0.02 km^{2})
- Elevation: 72 ft (22 m)

Population (2020)
  - Total: 1,281
  - Density: 182.4/sq mi (70.42/km^{2})
- Time zone: UTC−05:00 (Eastern (EST))
  - Summer (DST): UTC−04:00 (EDT)
- ZIP Code: 08332 (Millville)
- Area code: 856
- FIPS code: 34-11770
- GNIS feature ID: 2806061

Centre Grove is a census-designated place (CDP) located in Cumberland County, in the U.S. state of New Jersey. It is in the center part of the county, on the east side of Lawrence Township. It is bordered to the east by the city of Millville. Bridgeton, the Cumberland county seat, is 9 miles (14 km) to the northwest.

Centre Grove was first listed as a CDP prior to the 2020 census with a population of 1,281.

== Demographics ==
Historical population
| Census | Pop. | Note | %± |
|---|---|---|---|
| 2020 | 1,281 | | — |
U.S. Decennial Census; 2020

Centre Grove first appeared as a census designated place in the 2020 U.S. census.

=== 2020 census ===
Centre Grove CDP, New Jersey – Racial and ethnic composition Note: the US Census treats Hispanic/Latino as an ethnic category. This table excludes Latinos from the racial categories and assigns them to a separate category. Hispanics/Latinos may be of any race.
| Race / Ethnicity (NH = Non-Hispanic) | Pop 2020 | % 2020 |
|---|---|---|
| White alone (NH) | 996 | 77.75% |
| Black or African American alone (NH) | 93 | 7.26% |
| Native American or Alaska Native alone (NH) | 6 | 0.47% |
| Asian alone (NH) | 3 | 0.23% |
| Native Hawaiian or Pacific Islander alone (NH) | 0 | 0.00% |
| Other race alone (NH) | 4 | 0.31% |
| Mixed race or Multiracial (NH) | 66 | 5.15% |
| Hispanic or Latino (any race) | 113 | 8.82% |
| Total | 1,281 | 100.00% |

== Education ==
Students are zoned to Lawrence Township School District.
