= Buckshutem, New Jersey =

Populated place in Cumberland County, New Jersey, US

- Unincorporated community
- Location in Cumberland County (Inset: Cumberland County in New Jersey) Buckshutem (New Jersey) Buckshutem (the United States)
- Coordinates: 39°19′08″N 75°00′46″W
- Country: United States
- State: New Jersey
- County: Cumberland
- Township: Commercial
- Elevation: 20 ft (6 m)
- Time zone: UTC−05:00 (Eastern (EST))
  - Summer (DST): UTC−04:00 (Eastern (EDT))
- Area code: 856
- GNIS feature ID: 875011

Buckshutem is an unincorporated community located within Commercial Township, in Cumberland County, in the U.S. state of New Jersey. The community is situated near Buckshutem Creek, nearby Laurel Lake. The name "Buckshutem" is of Native American origin; though others say that the name is derived from the creek's rapid flow of water as it empties into the brisk wake of the Maurice River, producing a cross current that causes a boat to "buck and shoot" through that section.
