= Haleyville =

Haleyville may refer to:

- Haleyville, Alabama
  - Haleyville City Schools
- Haleyville, New Jersey
