= Laurel Lake =

Laurel Lake may refer to:

== Settlements ==
- Laurel Lake, New Jersey

== Lakes ==
- Laurel Lake (Cumberland County, Pennsylvania)
- Laurel Lake (Teton County, Wyoming) in Grand Teton National Park
- Laurel Lake in Windham County, Vermont
- Laurel River Lake west of Corbin, Kentucky
