= Elden H. Johnson =

US Army soldier (1921–1944)

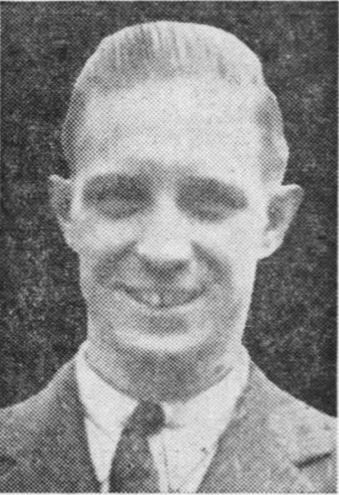
- Born: February 13, 1921; Bivalve, New Jersey, US
- Died: June 3, 1944 (aged 23) near Valmontone, Italy
- Burial place: Union Cemetery, Scituate, Massachusetts
- Military career
- Allegiance: United States of America
- Branch: United States Army
- Service years: 1943 - 1944
- Rank: Private
- Units: 15th Infantry Regiment, 3rd Infantry Division
- Conflicts: World War II
- Awards: Medal of Honor Purple Heart

Elden Harvey Johnson (February 13, 1921 – June 3, 1944) was a United States Army soldier and a recipient of the United States military's highest decoration—the Medal of Honor—for his actions in World War II.

Johnson was born in the Bivalve section of Commercial Township, New Jersey. He joined the Army from East Weymouth, Massachusetts in April 1943, and by June 3, 1944, was serving as a private in the 15th Infantry Regiment, 3rd Infantry Division. When his unit was ambushed on that day, near Valmontone, Italy, he deliberately drew the hostile German fire onto himself so that his comrades could escape. He succeeded in destroying a German machine gun position before he was killed. For these actions, he was posthumously awarded the Medal of Honor a year later, on May 16, 1945.

Johnson, aged 23 at his death, was buried in Union Cemetery, Scituate, Massachusetts.

== Medal of Honor citation ==
Private Johnson's official Medal of Honor citation reads:

For conspicuous gallantry and intrepidity at risk of life above and beyond the call of duty. Pvt. Johnson elected to sacrifice his life in order that his comrades might extricate themselves from an ambush. Braving the massed fire of about 60 riflemen, 3 machineguns, and 3 tanks from positions only 25 yards distant, he stood erect and signaled his patrol leader to withdraw. The whole area was brightly illuminated by enemy flares. Then, despite 20mm. machineguns, machine pistol, and rifle fire directed at him, Pvt. Johnson advanced beyond the enemy in a slow deliberate walk. Firing his automatic rifle from the hip, he succeeded in distracting the enemy and enabled his 12 comrades to escape. Advancing to within 5 yards of a machinegun, emptying his weapon, Pvt. Johnson killed its crew. Standing in full view of the enemy he reloaded and turned on the riflemen to the left, firing directly into their positions. He either killed or wounded 4 of them. A burst of machinegun fire tore into Pvt. Johnson and he dropped to his knees. Fighting to the very last, he steadied himself on his knees and sent a final burst of fire crashing into another German. With that he slumped forward dead. Pvt. Johnson had willingly given his life in order that his comrades might live. These acts on the part of Pvt. Johnson were an inspiration to the entire command and are in keeping with the highest traditions of the armed forces.

== Awards and decorations ==

Badge	Combat Infantryman Badge		
1st row	Medal of Honor		
2nd row	Bronze Star Medal	Purple Heart	Army Good Conduct Medal
3rd row	American Campaign Medal	European–African–Middle Eastern Campaign Medal with 1 campaign star	World War II Victory Medal

== Honored in ship naming ==
The United States Army ship USAT Private Elden H. Johnson which operated in the Pacific Ocean at the end of World War II was named in his honor.

== Johnson Barracks ==
In 1949 the former German "Panzerkaserne" at Fuerth/Germany was renamed to Johnson Barracks. From the 1970s Johnson Barracks was home of the 16th Engineer Battalion which supported two brigades of the 1st Armored Division and one brigade of the 2nd AD. It also contained warehouses and other facilities for various supply elements from William O. Darby Barracks.

== Honored in school naming ==
An elementary school in Weymouth, Massachusetts, now housing the Johnson Early Childhood Center, was named in his honor and prominently displays a copy of his Medal of Honor citation.

== See also ==
- List of Medal of Honor recipients
- List of Medal of Honor recipients for World War II
