= Oyster schooner =

An oyster schooner is a type of traditional fishing boat specifically designed for the harvesting of oysters. Typically, an oyster schooner was a gaff-rigged two-masted schooner akin to the Dorchester schooner. They were used in the past in Delaware Bay until a blight killed most of the oysters in that area. A surviving example is the A.J. Meerwald located in Bivalve, New Jersey.

== See also ==
- A. J. Meerwald
- Cashier
- Katherine M. Lee
- Maggie S. Myers
