= Lawrence Township, Cumberland County, New Jersey =

Township in Cumberland County, New Jersey, US

Lawrence Township, New Jersey
- Township
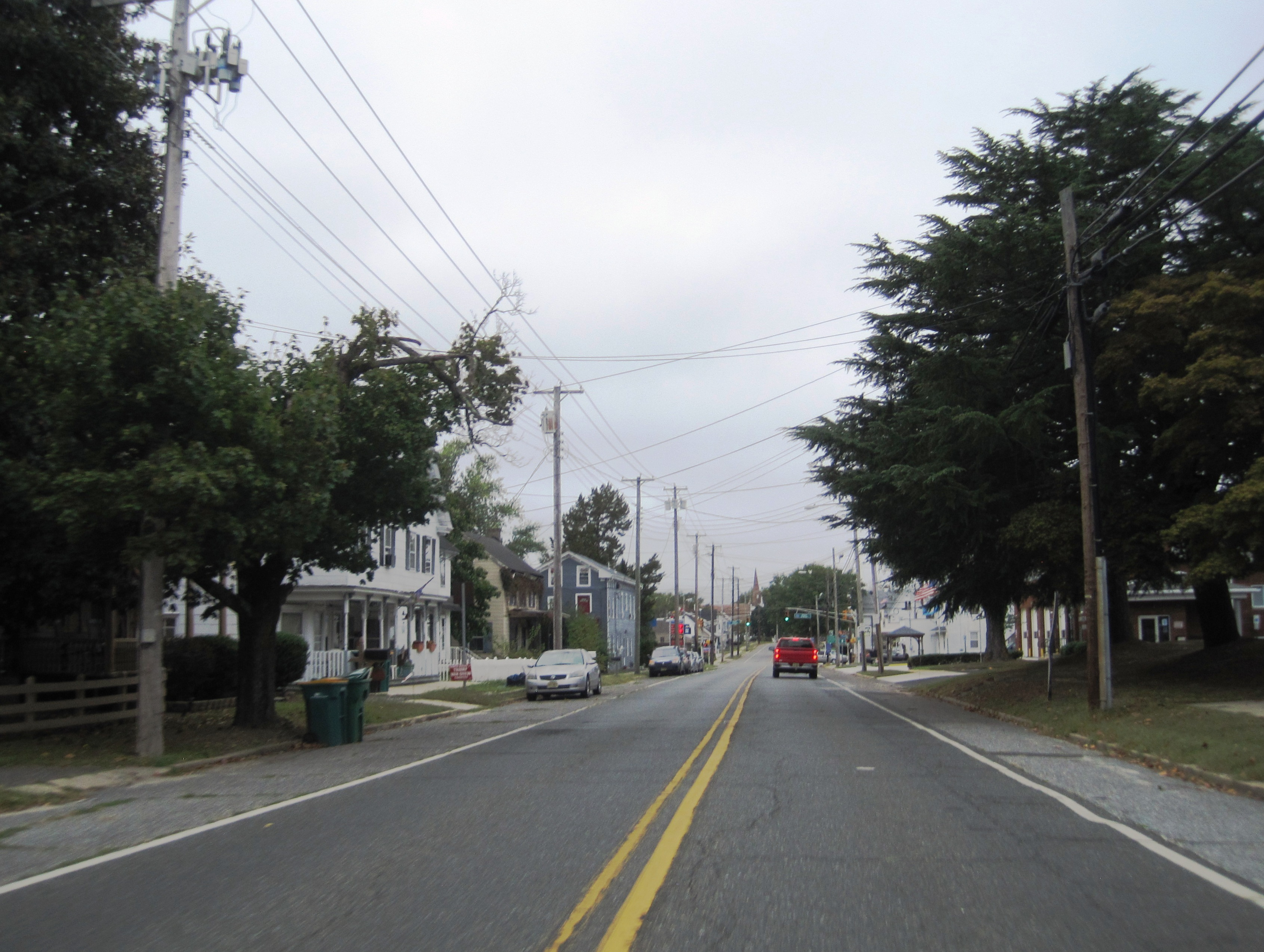
- Community of Cedarville

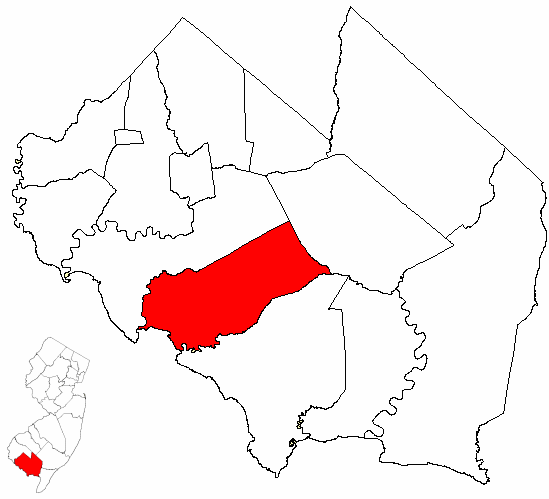
- Location of Lawrence Township in Cumberland County highlighted in red (right). Inset map: Location of Cumberland County in New Jersey highlighted in red (left).

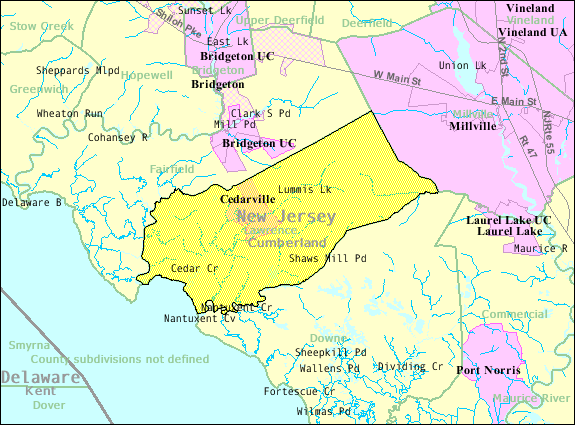
- Census Bureau map of Lawrence Township, Cumberland County, New Jersey

- Location in Cumberland County Location in New Jersey Location in the United States
- Coordinates: 39.334878°N 75.184579°W
- Country: United States
- State: New Jersey
- County: Cumberland
- Incorporated: February 17, 1885
- Named for: Capt. James Lawrence

Government
  - Type: Township
  - Body: Township Committee
  - Mayor: Joseph Miletta Jr. (D, term ends December 31, 2023)
  - Municipal clerk: Karrie Hulitt (acting)

Area
  - Total: 38.39 sq mi (99.43 km^{2})
  - Land: 36.92 sq mi (95.63 km^{2})
  - Water: 1.47 sq mi (3.80 km^{2}) 3.82%
  - Rank: 61st of 565 in state 6th of 14 in county
- Elevation: 39 ft (12 m)

Population (2020)
  - Total: 3,087
  - Estimate (2023): 3,073
  - Rank: 447th of 565 in state 10th of 14 in county
  - Density: 83.6/sq mi (32.3/km^{2})
  - Rank: 548th of 565 in state 10th of 14 in county
- Time zone: UTC−05:00 (Eastern (EST))
  - Summer (DST): UTC−04:00 (Eastern (EDT))
- ZIP Code: 08311 – Cedarville
- Area code: 856 exchange: 447
- FIPS code: 3401139450
- GNIS feature ID: 0882060
- Website: www.lawrencetwpcumberlandnj.com

Lawrence Township is a township in Cumberland County, in the U.S. state of New Jersey. It is part of the Vineland-Bridgeton metropolitan statistical area for statistical purposes. As of the 2020 United States census, the township's population was 3,087, a decrease of 203 (−6.2%) from the 2010 census count of 3,290, which in turn reflected an increase of 569 (+20.9%) from the 2,721 counted in the 2000 census.

Lawrence Township was incorporated as a township by an act of the New Jersey Legislature on February 17, 1885, from portions of Fairfield Township. The township was named in honor of Captain James Lawrence—commander of the frigate USS Chesapeake and one of the naval heroes of the War of 1812—best known for his dying command of "Don't Give up the Ship".

Lawrence Township is a dry township, where alcohol cannot be sold.

== Geography ==
According to the United States Census Bureau, the township had a total area of 38.39 square miles (99.43 km^{2}), including 36.92 square miles (95.63 km^{2}) of land and 1.47 square miles (3.80 km^{2}) of water (3.82%).

Cedarville (2020 population of 702) and Centre Grove (1,281) are unincorporated communities and census-designated places (CDP) located Lawrence Township.

Other unincorporated communities, localities and place names located partially or completely within the township include Jones Island, Lummis Mill, Lummistown and Sayres Neck.

The township borders the Cumberland County municipalities of Downe Township, Fairfield Township, Millville, and the Delaware Bay.

== Demographics ==
Historical population
Census	Pop.	Note	%±
1890	1,729		—
1900	1,658		−4.1%
1910	1,746		5.3%
1920	1,549		−11.3%
1930	1,770		14.3%
1940	1,754		−0.9%
1950	2,044		16.5%
1960	2,639		29.1%
1970	2,329		−11.7%
1980	2,116		−9.1%
1990	2,433		15.0%
2000	2,721		11.8%
2010	3,290		20.9%
2020	3,087		−6.2%
2023 (est.)	3,073		−0.5%
Population sources: 1890–2010 1890–1920; 1890–1910 1910–1930; 1940–2000 2000; 2010 2020

=== 2010 census ===
The 2010 United States census counted 3,290 people, 1,102 households, and 850 families in the township. The population density was 89.1 per square mile (34.4/km^{2}). There were 1,221 housing units at an average density of 33.1 per square mile (12.8/km^{2}). The racial makeup was 81.03% (2,666) White, 9.24% (304) Black or African American, 1.16% (38) Native American, 0.40% (13) Asian, 0.03% (1) Pacific Islander, 5.02% (165) from other races, and 3.13% (103) from two or more races. Hispanic or Latino of any race were 11.37% (374) of the population.

Of the 1,102 households, 36.3% had children under the age of 18; 59.9% were married couples living together; 11.2% had a female householder with no husband present and 22.9% were non-families. Of all households, 17.5% were made up of individuals and 6.7% had someone living alone who was 65 years of age or older. The average household size was 2.95 and the average family size was 3.28.

26.2% of the population were under the age of 18, 8.7% from 18 to 24, 27.1% from 25 to 44, 27.1% from 45 to 64, and 10.9% who were 65 years of age or older. The median age was 37.8 years. For every 100 females, the population had 99.5 males. For every 100 females ages 18 and older there were 100.1 males.

The Census Bureau's 2006–2010 American Community Survey showed that (in 2010 inflation-adjusted dollars) median household income was $70,948 (with a margin of error of +/− $4,480) and the median family income was $72,014 (+/− $2,843). Males had a median income of $55,208 (+/− $6,323) versus $30,382 (+/− $5,144) for females. The per capita income for the borough was $27,934 (+/− $3,545). About 5.2% of families and 6.1% of the population were below the poverty line, including 7.1% of those under age 18 and 8.6% of those age 65 or over.

=== 2000 census ===
As of the 2000 United States census there were 2,721 people, 920 households, and 712 families residing in the township. The population density was 72.6 inhabitants per square mile (28.0/km^{2}). There were 1,023 housing units at an average density of 27.3 per square mile (10.5/km^{2}). The racial makeup of the township was 81.88% White, 10.40% African American, 1.07% Native American, 0.26% Asian, 0.18% Pacific Islander, 3.42% from other races, and 2.79% from two or more races. Hispanic or Latino of any race were 7.02% of the population.

There were 920 households, out of which 38.4% had children under the age of 18 living with them, 60.8% were married couples living together, 11.6% had a female householder with no husband present, and 22.6% were non-families. 17.8% of all households were made up of individuals, and 8.4% had someone living alone who was 65 years of age or older. The average household size was 2.90 and the average family size was 3.27.

In the township the population was spread out, with 28.5% under the age of 18, 6.7% from 18 to 24, 30.9% from 25 to 44, 23.3% from 45 to 64, and 10.5% who were 65 years of age or older. The median age was 36 years. For every 100 females, there were 99.3 males. For every 100 females age 18 and over, there were 98.2 males.

The median income for a household in the township was $46,083, and the median income for a family was $48,456. Males had a median income of $36,891 versus $22,188 for females. The per capita income for the township was $17,654. About 6.2% of families and 8.9% of the population were below the poverty line, including 6.3% of those under age 18 and 7.3% of those age 65 or over.

== Government ==
=== Local government ===
Lawrence Township is governed under the Township form of New Jersey municipal government, one of 141 municipalities (of the 564) statewide that use this form, the second-most commonly used form of government in the state. The governing body is comprised of a three-member Township Committee, whose members are elected directly by the voters at-large in partisan elections to serve three-year terms of office on a staggered basis, with one seat coming up for election each year as part of the November general election in a three-year cycle. At an annual reorganization meeting, the Township Committee selects one of its members to serve as Mayor and another as Deputy Mayor.

As of 2023, members of the Lawrence Township Council are Mayor Joseph A. Miletta Jr. (D, term on committee ends December 31, 2024; term as mayor ends 2023), Deputy Mayor Elmer "Skip" Bowman (R, term on committee and as deputy mayor ends 2023) and John M. Tisa (R, 2025).

The New Jersey State Police provides police protection in Lawrence Township from the Troop A barracks located in Port Norris.

=== Federal, state and county representation ===
Lawrence Township is located in the 2nd Congressional District and is part of New Jersey's 1st state legislative district.

For the 119th United States Congress, New Jersey's 2nd congressional district is represented by Jeff Van Drew (R, Dennis Township). New Jersey is represented in the United States Senate by Democrats Cory Booker (Newark, term ends 2027) and Andy Kim (Moorestown, term ends 2031).

For the 2026–2027 session, the 1st legislative district of the New Jersey Legislature is represented in the State Senate by Mike Testa (R, Vineland) and in the General Assembly by Antwan McClellan (R, Ocean City) and Erik K. Simonsen (R, Lower Township).

Cumberland County is governed by a Board of County Commissioners composed of seven members who are elected at large by the citizens of Cumberland County in partisan elections and serve staggered three-year terms in office, with either two or three seats coming up for election each year in a three-year cycle. Annually, the seven board members select a Director and Deputy Director for one-year terms. As of 2025, members of the Cumberland County Board of County Commissioners (with party affiliation, residence and term-end year listed in parentheses) are:

Douglas A. Albrecht (R, Vineland, 2025), Deputy Director Antonio Romero (R, Vineland, 2027), Sandra Taylor (R, Downe Township; 2026), Victoria Groetsch-Lods (R, Vineland, 2025), Arthur Marchand (R, Hopewell Township, 2026), James Sauro (R, Vineland, 2026) and Robert A. Austino (D, Bridgeton, 2027).

The county's constitutional officers are: Clerk Celeste Riley (D, Bridgeton, 2029), Sheriff Michael Donato (R, Bridgeton, 2026) and Surrogate Rudolph Luisi (R, Vineland, 2028).

=== Politics ===
As of March 2011, there were a total of 1,917 registered voters in Lawrence Township, of which 584 (30.5%) were registered as Democrats, 364 (19.0%) were registered as Republicans and 969 (50.5%) were registered as Unaffiliated. There were no voters registered to other parties.

Gubernatorial election results for Lawrence Township
Year	Republican		Democratic		Third party(ies)	
Year	No.	%	No.	%	No.	%
2025	784	69.32%	339	29.97%	8	0.71%
2021	612	78.66%	160	20.57%	6	0.77%
2017	402	62.71%	222	34.63%	17	2.65%
2013	450	68.70%	197	30.08%	8	1.22%
2009	353	48.16%	306	41.75%	74	10.10%
2005	260	42.14%	320	51.86%	37	6.00%

In the 2012 presidential election, Republican Mitt Romney received 52.6% of the vote (618 cast), ahead of Democrat Barack Obama with 45.9% (539 votes), and other candidates with 1.4% (17 votes), among the 1,187 ballots cast by the township's 1,972 registered voters (13 ballots were spoiled), for a turnout of 60.2%. In the 2008 presidential election, Republican John McCain received 48.8% of the vote (613 cast), ahead of Democrat Barack Obama, who received 48.3% (607 votes), with 1,256 ballots cast among the township's 1,894 registered voters, for a turnout of 66.3%. In the 2004 presidential election, Republican George W. Bush received 51.8% of the vote (586 ballots cast), outpolling Democrat John Kerry, who received 45.7% (517 votes), with 1,131 ballots cast among the township's 1,683 registered voters, for a turnout percentage of 67.2.

United States presidential election results for Lawrence Township 2024 2020 2016 2012 2008 2004
Year	Republican		Democratic		Third party(ies)	
Year	No.	%	No.	%	No.	%
2024	1,092	73.04%	392	26.22%	11	0.74%
2020	1,063	68.94%	468	30.35%	11	0.71%
2016	821	66.86%	370	30.13%	37	3.01%
2012	618	52.64%	539	45.91%	17	1.45%
2008	613	48.81%	607	48.33%	36	2.87%
2004	586	51.81%	517	45.71%	28	2.48%

In the 2013 gubernatorial election, Republican Chris Christie received 68.7% of the vote (450 cast), ahead of Democrat Barbara Buono with 30.1% (197 votes), and other candidates with 1.2% (8 votes), among the 663 ballots cast by the township's 1,902 registered voters (8 ballots were spoiled), for a turnout of 34.9%. In the 2009 gubernatorial election, Republican Chris Christie received 46.9% of the vote (353 ballots cast), ahead of both Democrat Jon Corzine with 40.7% (306 votes) and Independent Chris Daggett with 7.3% (55 votes), with 752 ballots cast among the township's 1,865 registered voters, yielding a 40.3% turnout.

United States Senate election results for Lawrence Township1
Year	Republican		Democratic		Third party(ies)	
Year	No.	%	No.	%	No.	%
2024	1,008	71.09%	377	26.59%	33	2.33%
2018	621	67.43%	267	28.99%	33	3.58%
2012	520	48.64%	516	48.27%	33	3.09%
2006	301	49.51%	285	46.88%	22	3.62%

United States Senate election results for Lawrence Township2
Year	Republican		Democratic		Third party(ies)	
Year	No.	%	No.	%	No.	%
2020	1,013	67.58%	457	30.49%	29	1.93%
2014	377	64.44%	195	33.33%	13	2.22%
2013	236	66.11%	115	32.21%	6	1.68%
2008	515	46.99%	540	49.27%	41	3.74%

== Education ==
The Lawrence Township School District serves public school students in pre-kindergarten through eighth grade at Myron L. Powell School. As of the 2022–23 school year, the district, comprised of one school, had an enrollment of 484 students and 44.6 classroom teachers (on an FTE basis), for a student–teacher ratio of 10.9:1.

For ninth through twelfth grades, public school students in Lawrence Township are assigned to one of two school districts based on the location of their residence. Students attend high school either in Bridgeton or Millville, based on sending/receiving relationships with the respective school districts, the Bridgeton Public Schools and the Millville Public Schools. Students sent to Bridgeton attend Bridgeton High School. Students sent to Millville join students from Commercial Township and Maurice River Township at Millville High School

Students are also eligible to attend Cumberland County Technical Education Center in Vineland, serving students from the entire county in its full-time technical training programs, which are offered without charge to students who are county residents.

== Transportation ==
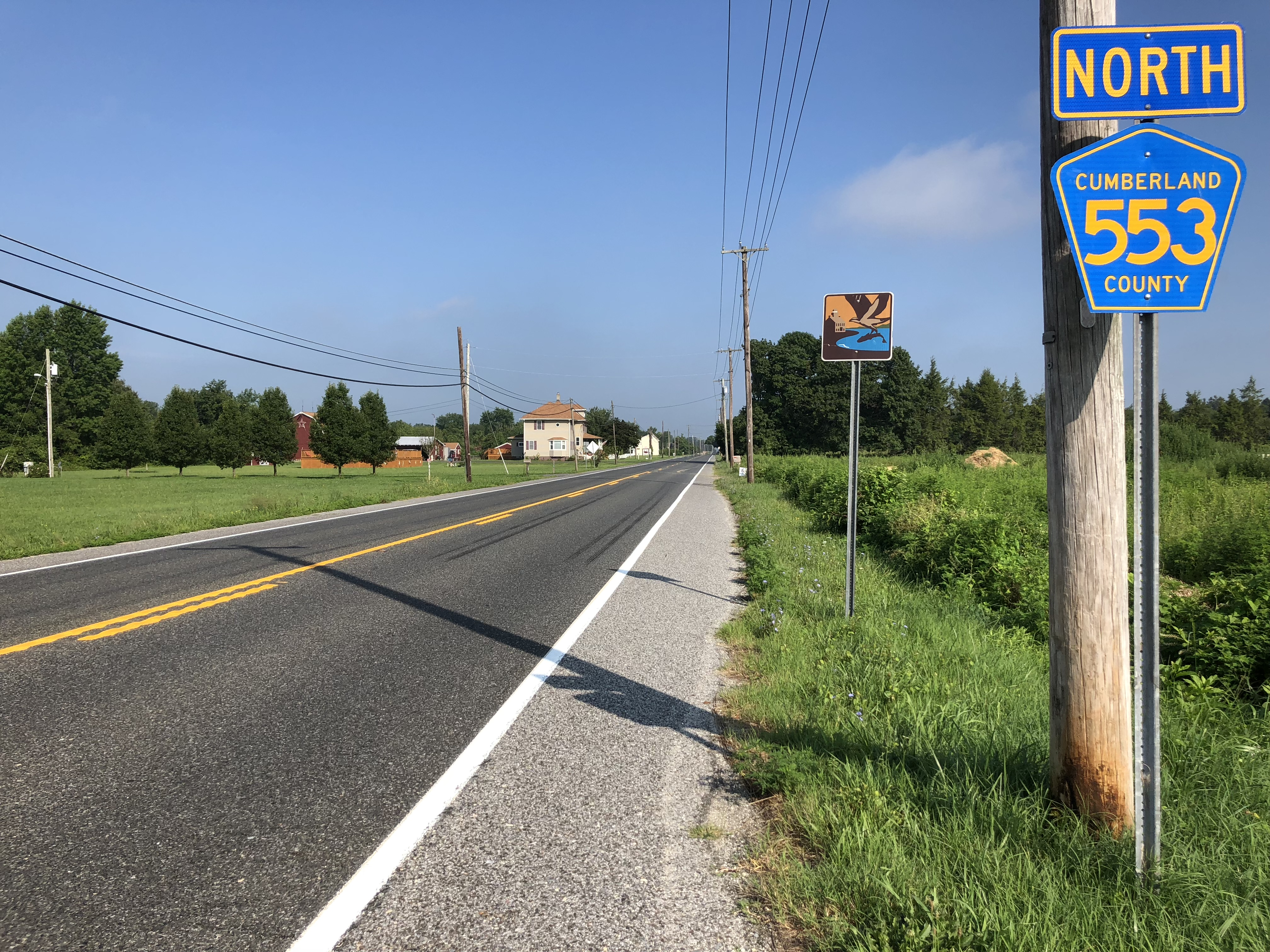
County Route 553 northbound in Lawrence Township

As of May 2010, the township had a total of 54.06 miles (87.00 km) of roadways, of which 26.30 miles (42.33 km) were maintained by the municipality and 27.76 miles (44.68 km) by Cumberland County.

County Route 553 is the most significant roadway serving Lawrence Township.

== Notable people ==
People who were born in, residents of, or otherwise closely associated with Lawrence Township include:

- Ephraim Bateman (1780–1829), represented New Jersey in the United States Senate from 1826 to 1829 and in the United States House of Representatives from 1815 to 1823
- John Davis (died 1863), United States Navy sailor in the American Civil War who received the Medal of Honor for his action aboard the USS Valley City
- Ebenezer Elmer (1752–1843), physician and politician who represented New Jersey in the House of Representatives from 1801 to 1807
- Jonathan Elmer (1745–1817), politician who represented New Jersey in the United States Senate from 1789 to 1791
- Benjamin Franklin Howell (1844–1933), represented New Jersey's 3rd congressional district from 1895 to 1911
- Samuel Alexander Kinnier Wilson (1878–1937), neurologist who described hepatolenticular degeneration, a copper metabolism disorder affecting the liver and central nervous system, that would later be called Wilson's disease
