= Commercial Township School District =

School district in Cumberland County, New Jersey, US

Address
- 1308 North Avenue Port Norris, Cumberland County, New Jersey, 08349; United States
- Coordinates: 39.282118°N 75.024196°W

District information
- Grades: K-8
- Superintendent: Jean Smith
- Business administrator: Darren Harris
- Schools: 1

Students and staff
- Enrollment: 488 (as of 2023–24)
- Faculty: 42.0 FTEs
- Student–teacher ratio: 11.6:1

Other information
- District Factor Group: A
- Website: commercialschools.org
| Ind. | Per pupil | District spending | Rank (*) | K-8 average | %± vs. average |
|---|---|---|---|---|---|
| 1A | Total Spending | $18,559 | 34 | $18,891 | −1.8% |
| 1 | Budgetary Cost | 11,805 | 8 | 14,159 | −16.6% |
| 2 | Classroom Instruction | 7,660 | 10 | 8,659 | −11.5% |
| 6 | Support Services | 1,396 | 5 | 2,167 | −35.6% |
| 8 | Administrative Cost | 1,612 | 27 | 1,547 | 4.2% |
| 10 | Operations & Maintenance | 1,076 | 7 | 1,612 | −33.3% |
| 13 | Extracurricular Activities | 40 | 8 | 104 | −61.5% |
| 16 | Median Teacher Salary | 59,530 | 32 | 61,136 |
Data from NJDoE 2014 Taxpayers' Guide to Education Spending. *Of K-8 districts with 401-750 students. Lowest spending=1; Highest=64

The Commercial Township School District is a community public school district that serves students in kindergarten through eighth grade from Commercial Township, in Cumberland County, in the U.S. state of New Jersey.

As of the 2023–24 school year, the district, comprised of one school, had an enrollment of 488 students and 42.0 classroom teachers (on an FTE basis), for a student–teacher ratio of 11.6:1.

The district had been classified by the New Jersey Department of Education as being in District Factor Group "A", the lowest of eight groupings. District Factor Groups organize districts statewide to allow comparison by common socioeconomic characteristics of the local districts. From lowest socioeconomic status to highest, the categories are A, B, CD, DE, FG, GH, I and J.

Students in ninth through twelfth grades for public school attend Millville High School in Millville, together with students from Lawrence Township and Maurice River Township, as part of a sending/receiving relationship with the Millville Public Schools. As of the 2023–24 school year, the high school had an enrollment of 1,655 students and 81.0 classroom teachers (on an FTE basis), for a student–teacher ratio of 20.4:1.

== History ==
In the era of de jure educational segregation in the United States the district maintained separate schools on the basis of race. In 1948 this persisted; the Journal of Negro Education that year wrote that the elementary school for black students "is in very bad condition", citing water and snow coming in from a roof in poor condition.

With student enrollment falling, the district closed Port Norris Middle School during the COVID-19 pandemic in March 2020, a facility which had been open since 1916. All district students were consolidated into Commercial Township School, which had previously been known as Haleyville-Mauricetown Elementary School.

== Schools ==
Commercial Township School serves students in grades K-8 and had an enrollment of 482 students in the 2023–24 school year.

== Administration ==
Core members of the district's administration are:

- Jean Smith, superintendent and principal
- Darren Harris, business administrator and board secretary

== Board of education ==
The district's board of education, comprised of nine members, sets policy and oversees the fiscal and educational operation of the district through its administration. As a Type II school district, the board's trustees are elected directly by voters to serve three-year terms of office on a staggered basis, with three seats up for election each year held (since 2012) as part of the November general election. The board appoints a superintendent to oversee the district's day-to-day operations and a business administrator to supervise the business functions of the district.
