= Maggie S. Myers (schooner) =

- MAGGIE S. MYERS (schooner)
- U.S. National Register of Historic Places
- Location within Delaware Location within the United States
- Location: docked near Davidson St. Bowers Beach, Delaware.
- Coordinates: 39°3′20.94″N 75°24′1.11″W
- Area: less than one acre
- Built: 1893
- MPS: Bowers Beach DE MRA
- NRHP reference No.: 83001378
- Added to NRHP: April 25, 1983

The Maggie S. Myers is an oyster schooner, built in 1893 reportedly at Bridgeton, New Jersey. She is 50-foot-long (15 m) and all the framing is of white oak. The rigging was removed in the 1940s, when the vessel was converted to power. She is maintained and used for oyster dredging on the waters of the Delaware Bay.

She was restored by her current owner, Frank "Thumper" Eicherly IV of Bowers Beach, Delaware, and ran on both sail as well as combustion. She sank on December 23, 2022, but was refloated several days later.

She was listed on the National Register of Historic Places in 1983.

A similar oyster dredging schooner, the Katherine M. Lee, which is also listed on the NRHP, was also docked near Davidson St in Bowers Beach, Delaware.
