= Lawrence Township School District =

School district in Cumberland County, New Jersey, US

Address
- 225 Main Street Cedarville, Cumberland County, New Jersey, 08311; United States
- Coordinates: 39.339008°N 75.203601°W

District information
- Grades: PreK-8
- Superintendent: Steve Price (interim)
- Business administrator: Lisa DiNovi
- Schools: 1

Students and staff
- Enrollment: 484 (as of 2022–23)
- Faculty: 44.6 FTEs
- Student–teacher ratio: 10.9:1

Other information
- District Factor Group: CD
- Website: www.myronlpowell.org
Ind.	Per pupil	District spending	Rank (*)	K-8 average	%± vs. average
1A	Total Spending	$15,864	10	$18,891	−16.0%
1	Budgetary Cost	11,070	4	14,159	−21.8%
2	Classroom Instruction	7,305	6	8,659	−15.6%
6	Support Services	1,196	2	2,167	−44.8%
8	Administrative Cost	1,234	4	1,547	−20.2%
10	Operations & Maintenance	1,183	13	1,612	−26.6%
13	Extracurricular Activities	109	28	104	4.8%
16	Median Teacher Salary	61,936	36	61,136
Data from NJDoE 2014 Taxpayers' Guide to Education Spending. *Of K-8 districts with 401-750 students. Lowest spending=1; Highest=64

The Lawrence Township School District is a community public school district that serves students in pre-kindergarten through eighth grade from Lawrence Township, in Cumberland County, in the U.S. state of New Jersey.

As of the 2022–23 school year, the district, comprised of one school, had an enrollment of 484 students and 44.6 classroom teachers (on an FTE basis), for a student–teacher ratio of 10.9:1.

The district is classified by the New Jersey Department of Education as being in District Factor Group "CD", the sixth-highest of eight groupings. District Factor Groups organize districts statewide to allow comparison by common socioeconomic characteristics of the local districts. From lowest socioeconomic status to highest, the categories are A, B, CD, DE, FG, GH, I and J.

For ninth through twelfth grades, public school students in Lawrence Township are assigned to one of two school districts based on the location of their residence. Students attend high school either in Bridgeton or Millville, based on sending/receiving relationships with the respective school districts, the Bridgeton Public Schools and the Millville Public Schools. Students sent to Bridgeton attend Bridgeton High School. Students sent to Millville join students from Commercial Township and Maurice River Township at Millville High School.

== School ==
The Myron L. Powell School had an enrollment of 480 students in grades PreK-8 the 2022–23 school year.

== Administration ==
Core members of the district's administration are:

- Steve Price, interim superintendent
- Lisa DiNovi, business administrator and board secretary

== Board of education ==
The district's board of education, comprised of nine members, sets policy and oversees the fiscal and educational operation of the district through its administration. As a Type II school district, the board's trustees are elected directly by voters to serve three-year terms of office on a staggered basis, with three seats up for election each year held (since 2012) as part of the November general election. The board appoints a superintendent to oversee the district's day-to-day operations and a business administrator to supervise the business functions of the district.
