= Katherine M. Lee (schooner) =

- KATHERINE M. LEE (Schooner)
- U.S. National Register of Historic Places
- Location within Delaware Location within the United States
- Location: Fox's Dock at Front and Lombard Sts., Leipsic, Delaware
- Coordinates: 39°14′31″N 75°30′51″W
- Area: less than one acre
- Built: 1912
- Built by: Parsons Bill Boats
- MPS: Leipsic and Little Creek MRA
- NRHP reference No.: 83001375
- Added to NRHP: April 25, 1983

The Katherine M. Lee is a sail-powered oyster schooner, built in 1912 at Greenwich, New Jersey. She is 85-foot-long (26 m) and all the framing is of white oak. The rigging was removed in the 1940s, when the vessel was converted to diesel power. She is maintained and used for oyster dredging on the waters of the Delaware Bay.

She was listed on the National Register of Historic Places in 1983.

A similar oyster dredging schooner, the Maggie S. Myers which is also listed on the NRHP, was also docked near Front and Lombard streets in Leipsic, Delaware.
