= Cedarville, New Jersey =

Populated place in Cumberland County, New Jersey, US

- Census-designated place
- Map of Cedarville, highlighted within Cumberland County. Right: Location of Cumberland County in New Jersey.

- Location in Cumberland County Location in New Jersey Location in the United States
- Coordinates: 39.338571°N 75.214506°W
- Country: United States
- State: New Jersey
- County: Cumberland
- Township: Lawrence

Area
  - Total: 2.28 sq mi (5.91 km^{2})
  - Land: 2.24 sq mi (5.80 km^{2})
  - Water: 0.042 sq mi (0.11 km^{2}) 1.81%
- Elevation: 33 ft (10 m)

Population (2020)
  - Total: 702
  - Density: 313.3/sq mi (120.95/km^{2})
- Time zone: UTC−05:00 (Eastern (EST))
  - Summer (DST): UTC−04:00 (EDT)
- ZIP Code: 08311
- Area code: 856
- FIPS code: 34-11410
- GNIS feature ID: 2389294

Cedarville is an unincorporated community and census-designated place (CDP) located within Lawrence Township, in Cumberland County, in the U.S. state of New Jersey. It is part of the Vineland-Millville-Bridgeton Primary Metropolitan Statistical Area for statistical purposes. As of the 2020 United States census, the CDP's population was 702.

== Geography ==
According to the United States Census Bureau, the CDP had a total area of 2.277 square miles (5.90 km^{2}), including 2.236 square miles (5.79 km^{2}) of land and 0.041 square miles (0.11 km^{2}) of water (1.81%).

== Demographics ==
Historical population
Census	Pop.	Note	%±
1950	1,009		—
1960	1,095		8.5%
2000	793		—
2010	776		−2.1%
2020	702		−9.5%
Population sources: 1950 1960 1970; 1980 1990 2000; 2010 2020

Cedarville appeared as an unincorporated community in the 1950 U.S. census and the 1960 U.S. census. The community did not appear in subsequent censuses until being listed as a census designated place in the 2000 U.S. census.

=== 2020 census ===
Cedarville CDP, New Jersey – Racial and ethnic composition Note: the US Census treats Hispanic/Latino as an ethnic category. This table excludes Latinos from the racial categories and assigns them to a separate category. Hispanics/Latinos may be of any race.
Race / Ethnicity (NH = Non-Hispanic)	Pop 2000	Pop 2010	Pop 2020	% 2000	% 2010	% 2020
White alone (NH)	675	594	485	85.12%	76.55%	69.09%
Black or African American alone (NH)	63	78	33	7.94%	10.05%	4.70%
Native American or Alaska Native alone (NH)	14	8	3	1.77%	1.03%	0.43%
Asian alone (NH)	3	3	4	0.38%	0.39%	0.57%
Native Hawaiian or Pacific Islander alone (NH)	0	0	0	0.00%	0.00%	0.00%
Other race alone (NH)	0	0	5	0.00%	0.00%	0.71%
Mixed race or Multiracial (NH)	6	15	31	0.76%	1.93%	4.42%
Hispanic or Latino (any race)	32	78	141	4.04%	10.05%	20.09%
Total	793	776	702	100.00%	100.00%	100.00%

=== 2010 census ===
The 2010 United States census counted 776 people, 275 households, and 189 families in the CDP. The population density was 347.1 people per square mile (134.0 people/km^{2}). There were 300 housing units at an average density of 134.2 units per square mile (51.8 units/km^{2}). The racial makeup was 79.77% (619) White, 10.05% (78) Black or African American, 1.29% (10) Native American, 0.39% (3) Asian, 0.00% (0) Pacific Islander, 5.67% (44) from other races, and 2.84% (22) from two or more races. Hispanic or Latino of any race were 10.05% (78) of the population.

Of the 275 households, 29.8% had children under the age of 18; 52.0% were married couples living together; 9.8% had a female householder with no husband present and 31.3% were non-families. Of all households, 24.7% were made up of individuals and 13.1% had someone living alone who was 65 years of age or older. The average household size was 2.80 and the average family size was 3.30.

25.1% of the population were under the age of 18, 9.3% from 18 to 24, 24.4% from 25 to 44, 25.6% from 45 to 64, and 15.6% who were 65 years of age or older. The median age was 39.0 years. For every 100 females, the population had 97.0 males. For every 100 females ages 18 and older there were 95.6 males.

=== 2000 census ===
As of the 2000 United States census there were 793 people, 276 households, and 208 families living in the CDP. The population density was 134.9 people/km^{2} (349 people/mi^{2}). There were 306 housing units at an average density of 52.0 units/km^{2} (135 units/mi^{2}). The racial makeup of the CDP was 85.75% White, 8.83% African American, 1.77% Native American, 0.38% Asian, 2.52% from other races, and 0.76% from two or more races. Hispanic or Latino of any race were 4.04% of the population.

There were 276 households, out of which 34.1% had children under the age of 18 living with them, 58.3% were married couples living together, 11.2% had a female householder with no husband present, and 24.3% were non-families. 19.9% of all households were made up of individuals, and 12.3% had someone living alone who was 65 years of age or older. The average household size was 2.87, and the average family size was 3.26.

In the CDP the population was spread out, with 26.9% under the age of 18, 7.7% from 18 to 24, 28.9% from 25 to 44, 23.0% from 45 to 64, and 13.6% who were 65 years of age or older. The median age was 37 years. For every 100 females, there were 99.7 males. For every 100 females age 18 and over, there were 94.6 males.

The median income for a household in the CDP was $46,500, and the median income for a family was $48,021. Males had a median income of $35,833 versus $25,962 for females. The per capita income for the CDP was $15,446. About 2.6% of families and 3.8% of the population were below the poverty line, including 4.6% of those under age 18 and 3.9% of those age 65 or over.

== Education ==
Students are zoned to Lawrence Township School District.

== Notable people ==
People who were born in, residents of, or otherwise closely associated with Cedarville include:

- Mercedes Mota (1880–1964) educator, writer, developed public education in the Dominican Republic with her sister Antera Mota y Reyes. Attended Pan-American Exposition (Buffalo, NY 1901) as the bearer of a message about Dominican women. A brief dissertation on the feminine intellectual life in Santo Domingo, and her words aroused great interest. She was only a little over twenty years old. After raising her nieces and nephews in New York City, she lived in Cedarville from the 1940s until her death.
- Ephraim Bateman (1780–1829) represented New Jersey in the United States Senate from 1826 to 1829 and in the United States House of Representatives from 1815 to 1823.
- Benjamin Franklin Howell (1844–1933) represented New Jersey's 3rd congressional district from 1895 to 1911.
- Samuel Alexander Kinnier Wilson (1878–1937), neurologist who described hepatolenticular degeneration, a copper metabolism disorder affecting the liver and central nervous system, that would later be called Wilson's disease.
