= Laurel Lake, New Jersey =

Populated place in Cumberland County, New Jersey, US

- Census-designated place
- Map of Laurel Lake highlighted within Cumberland County. Right: Location of Cumberland County in New Jersey.

- Location in Cumberland County Location in New Jersey Location in the United States
- Coordinates: 39.326293°N 75.03062°W
- Country: United States
- State: New Jersey
- County: Cumberland
- Township: Commercial

Area
  - Total: 1.86 sq mi (4.82 km^{2})
  - Land: 1.74 sq mi (4.50 km^{2})
  - Water: 0.12 sq mi (0.32 km^{2}) 6.61%
- Elevation: 59 ft (18 m)

Population (2020)
  - Total: 2,861
  - Density: 1,646.1/sq mi (635.58/km^{2})
- Time zone: UTC−05:00 (Eastern (EST))
  - Summer (DST): UTC−04:00 (Eastern (EDT))
- ZIP Code: 08332 - Millville
- Area code: 856
- FIPS code: 34-39120
- GNIS feature ID: 02390038

Laurel Lake is an unincorporated community and census-designated place (CDP) located within Commercial Township, in Cumberland County, in the U.S. state of New Jersey. It is part of the Vineland-Millville-Bridgeton Primary Metropolitan Statistical Area for statistical purposes. As of the 2020 census, Laurel Lake had a population of 2,861.

== Geography ==
According to the United States Census Bureau, the CDP had a total area of 1.863 square miles (4.83 km^{2}), including 1.740 square miles (4.51 km^{2}) of land and 0.123 square miles (0.32 km^{2}) of water (6.61%).

== Demographics ==
Historical population
Census	Pop.	Note	%±
2000	2,929		—
2010	2,989		2.0%
2020	2,861		−4.3%
Population sources: 1950 1960 1970; 1980 1990 2000; 2010 2020

Laurel Lake first appeared as a census designated place in the 2000 U.S. census.

=== Racial and ethnic composition ===
Laurel Lake CDP, New Jersey – Racial and ethnic composition Note: the US Census treats Hispanic/Latino as an ethnic category. This table excludes Latinos from the racial categories and assigns them to a separate category. Hispanics/Latinos may be of any race.
Race / Ethnicity (NH = Non-Hispanic)	Pop 2000	Pop 2010	Pop 2020	% 2000	% 2010	% 2020
White alone (NH)	2,697	2,590	2,204	92.08%	86.65%	77.04%
Black or African American alone (NH)	50	93	127	1.71%	3.11%	4.44%
Native American or Alaska Native alone (NH)	10	10	11	0.34%	0.33%	0.38%
Asian alone (NH)	4	16	13	0.14%	0.54%	0.45%
Native Hawaiian or Pacific Islander alone (NH)	1	0	0	0.03%	0.00%	0.00%
Other race alone (NH)	0	2	6	0.00%	0.07%	0.21%
Mixed race or Multiracial (NH)	41	83	207	1.40%	2.78%	7.24%
Hispanic or Latino (any race)	126	195	293	4.30%	6.52%	10.24%
Total	2,929	2,989	2,861	100.00%	100.00%	100.00%

=== 2020 census ===
As of the 2020 census, Laurel Lake had a population of 2,861. The median age was 37.2 years. 24.6% of residents were under the age of 18 and 13.3% of residents were 65 years of age or older. For every 100 females there were 100.9 males, and for every 100 females age 18 and over there were 99.8 males age 18 and over.

0.0% of residents lived in urban areas, while 100.0% lived in rural areas.

There were 1,065 households in Laurel Lake, of which 33.3% had children under the age of 18 living in them. Of all households, 33.7% were married-couple households, 20.4% were households with a male householder and no spouse or partner present, and 31.3% were households with a female householder and no spouse or partner present. About 26.2% of all households were made up of individuals and 12.0% had someone living alone who was 65 years of age or older.

There were 1,251 housing units, of which 14.9% were vacant. The homeowner vacancy rate was 2.9% and the rental vacancy rate was 3.9%.

=== 2010 census ===
The 2010 United States census counted 2,989 people, 1,091 households, and 754 families in the CDP. The population density was 1,717.3 people per square mile (663.1 people/km^{2}). There were 1,230 housing units at an average density of 706.7 units per square mile (272.9 units/km^{2}). The racial makeup was 90.10% (2,693) White, 3.71% (111) Black or African American, 0.33% (10) Native American, 0.54% (16) Asian, 0.00% (0) Pacific Islander, 1.74% (52) from other races, and 3.58% (107) from two or more races. Hispanic or Latino of any race were 6.52% (195) of the population.

Of the 1,091 households, 32.3% had children under the age of 18; 39.0% were married couples living together; 18.9% had a female householder with no husband present and 30.9% were non-families. Of all households, 23.6% were made up of individuals and 8.3% had someone living alone who was 65 years of age or older. The average household size was 2.74 and the average family size was 3.15.

26.5% of the population were under the age of 18, 9.5% from 18 to 24, 28.0% from 25 to 44, 26.1% from 45 to 64, and 9.9% who were 65 years of age or older. The median age was 35.4 years. For every 100 females, the population had 99.3 males. For every 100 females ages 18 and older there were 98.7 males.

=== 2000 census ===
As of the 2000 United States census there were 2,929 people, 1,078 households, and 767 families living in the CDP. The population density was 642.6 people/km^{2} (1,664 people/mi^{2}). There were 1,240 housing units at an average density of 272.0 units/km^{2} (704 units/mi^{2}). The racial makeup of the CDP was 95.05% White, 1.74% African American, 0.41% Native American, 0.14% Asian, 0.03% Pacific Islander, 0.82% from other races, and 1.81% from two or more races. Hispanic or Latino of any race were 4.30% of the population.

There were 1,078 households, out of which 37.8% had children under the age of 18 living with them, 46.3% were married couples living together, 16.1% had a female householder with no husband present, and 28.8% were non-families. 22.8% of all households were made up of individuals, and 8.3% had someone living alone who was 65 years of age or older. The average household size was 2.72 and the average family size was 3.13.

In the CDP the population was spread out, with 28.8% under the age of 18, 10.1% from 18 to 24, 30.5% from 25 to 44, 19.7% from 45 to 64, and 10.8% who were 65 years of age or older. The median age was 32 years. For every 100 females, there were 98.7 males. For every 100 females age 18 and over, there were 96.6 males.

The median income for a household in the CDP was $32,041, and the median income for a family was $32,432. Males had a median income of $33,299 versus $21,048 for females. The per capita income for the CDP was $12,965. About 15.7% of families and 17.8% of the population were below the poverty line, including 22.8% of those under age 18 and 19.6% of those age 65 or over.

== Education ==
Students are zoned to Commercial Township School District.
