= USS Valley City =

Gunboat of the United States Navy

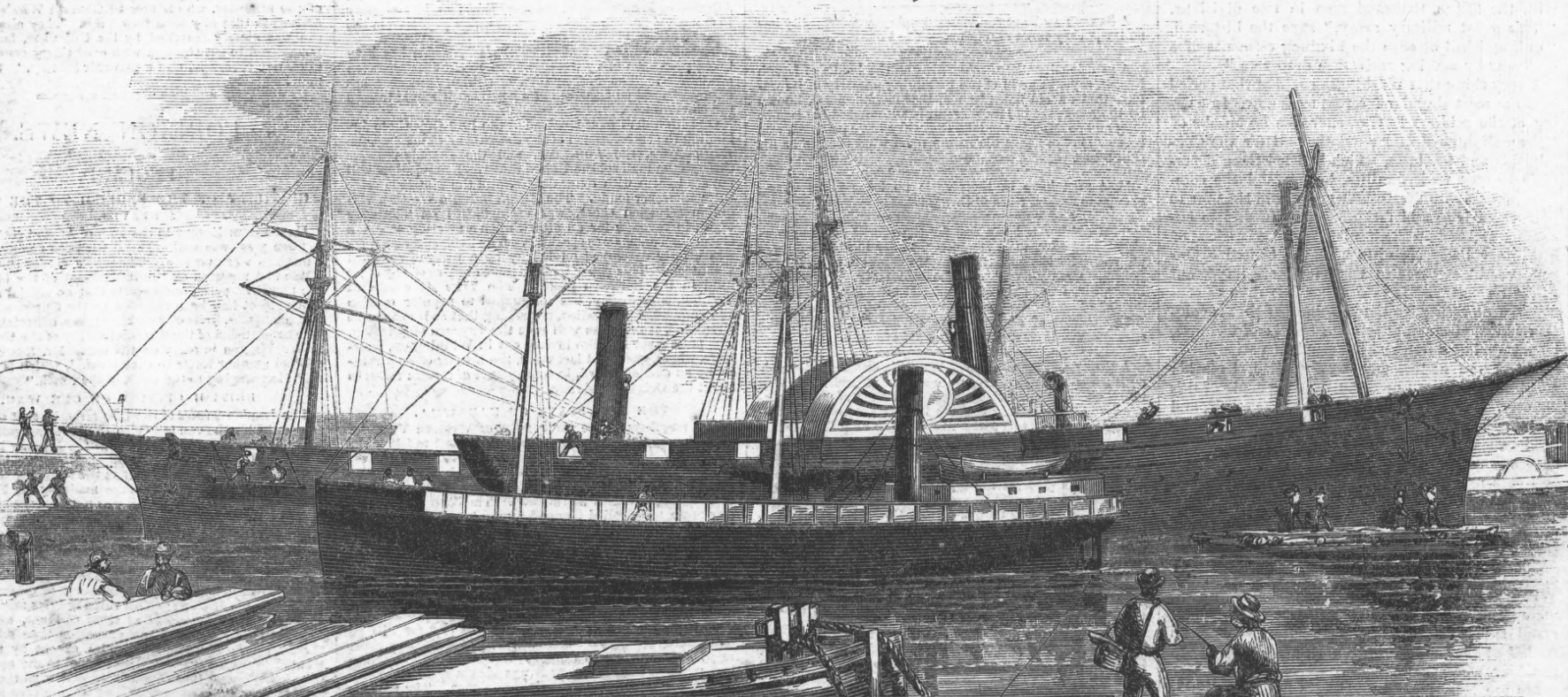
- Valley City (foreground) undergoing conversion into a gunboat at New York, 1861

History

United States
- Laid down: 1859
- Launched: 1859
- Acquired: 26 July 1861
- Commissioned: 13 September 1861
- Fate: Sold, 15 August 1865

General characteristics
- Displacement: 190 tons
- Length: 127 ft 6 in (38.86 m)
- Beam: 21 ft 10 in (6.65 m)
- Draft: 8 ft 4 in (2.54 m)
- Depth of hold: 7 ft 6 in (2.29 m)
- Propulsion: steam engine; screw-propelled
- Speed: 10 knots (19 km/h; 12 mph)
- Armament: 4 × 32-pounder guns, 42 Cwt.

USS Valley City was a 190-ton steamer acquired by the Union Navy for service in the American Civil War.

Valley City was outfitted as a gunboat and served blockade duty as well as performing surveillance duty.

== Service history ==
Valley City—a wooden-hulled screw-steamer built at Philadelphia, Pennsylvania, in 1859—was purchased by the Union Navy at New York City on 26 July 1861; and commissioned at the New York Navy Yard on 13 September 1861, Lt. James C. Chaplin in command. The next day, Valley City left New York to join the Potomac Flotilla commanded by Capt. Thomas T. Craven. She arrived in the Potomac River off Occoquan Creek, Virginia, on the 17th and began patrol and reconnaissance duties. She exchanged gunfire with a Confederate battery at Freestone Point, Virginia, on 25 September. Valley City was reassigned to the North Atlantic Blockading Squadron under Flag Officer Louis M. Goldsborough in October but first put into the Baltimore Navy Yard, Maryland, for emergency repairs to her funnel. After a brief stop in Hampton Roads late in December, the repaired steamer was deployed with the blockade off Hatteras Inlet, North Carolina, on 4 January 1862.

Valley City remained off Hatteras Inlet for one month and then participated in the successful amphibious assault upon Roanoke Island, North Carolina, on 7 and 8 February. The victory closed supply lines to the Confederate-held Norfolk Navy Yard and was largely responsible for the evacuation of that vital naval facility three months later. Following the capture of Roanoke Island, Valley City assisted in the capture of Elizabeth City, North Carolina, on the 10th. During the attack, a shot passed through the steamer's magazine and exploded in a locker containing fireworks. When Lt. Chaplin and others went below to extinguish the fire, they found Quarter Gunner John Davis seated calmly above an open barrel of powder to keep the fire out, while passing powder to the upper deck. For his incredible valor on this occasion, Davis received the Medal of Honor.

Valley City remained in the North Carolina sounds and participated in the capture of New Berne on 13 and 14 March and the subsequent clearing of the Neuse River. She returned to Baltimore, Maryland, for repairs on 2 June. In September, Valley City was assigned patrol and reconnaissance duty in Virginia's York River. She was reassigned to Plymouth, North Carolina, on 25 October to protect Union troops stationed there. On the evening of 2 November, she led a reconnaissance expedition up the Roanoke River to Hamilton which she left a week later and returned to New Berne. In January 1863, the vessel returned to the Norfolk Navy Yard for a new propeller and underwent further repairs and alterations at Baltimore, Maryland, before deploying off Washington, D.C., in April. Valley City fired upon Confederate positions near Blounts Creek, North Carolina, on 15 April, then left to join Lt. Charles W. Flusser's command at Plymouth on 19 April.

Valley City performed routine patrol and reconnaissance duties off Plymouth through July. On the 26th, the steamer helped to protect Union forces ashore during a joint expedition up the Chowan River, North Carolina. Later, while serving as a mail steamer, the vessel collided with the U.S. transport Vidette on 21 September and suffered one fatality. Valley City sailed for Hampton Roads on 27 November and proceeded on to Baltimore for repairs and did not return to New Berne until 19 February 1864, when she resumed her now familiar patrol and reconnaissance activities. Valley City was present at the evacuation of Washington, N.C., in May and captured the schooner M. O'Neill there on 5 May. During the summer months of May through September 1864, the steamer played an important role in support of Union forces ashore and afloat in scattered operations in the Roanoke, Chowan, Pamlico, Pungo, and Scuppernong rivers of North Carolina.

On 28 October, Valley City plucked Lt. William Barker Cushing from the Roanoke River after his daring, successful torpedo attack upon the Confederate ram CSS Albemarle at Plymouth and, from 29 October to 1 November, assisted in the recapture of Plymouth itself. While on an expedition up the Roanoke River on 20 December, the vessel suffered two casualties in a surprise attack by hidden Confederate shore batteries at Poplar Point, North Carolina. Valley City remained active during the last few months of the war, rendering assistance to a Union Army expedition to Colerain, North Carolina, in January 1865, and participating in a reconnaissance patrol up the Chowan River to Winton, North Carolina, in early April. In May, USS Iosco, Valley City, and a picket boat captured a motley collection of small Confederate watercraft during a sweep of the Roanoke River and also dragged the bottom for sunken guns and unexploded torpedoes (mines). Early in the summer, the steamer returned north and was sold at public auction at New York City on 15 August 1865. She was redocumented for merchant service on 28 December and was lost at sea off Cape San Blas, Florida, on 30 January 1882.

== Shipwreck ==
The shipwreck was identified in September 2009 by Michael C. Barnette and divers from the Association of Underwater Explorers.
