= Commercial Township, New Jersey =

Township in Cumberland County, New Jersey, US

- Township
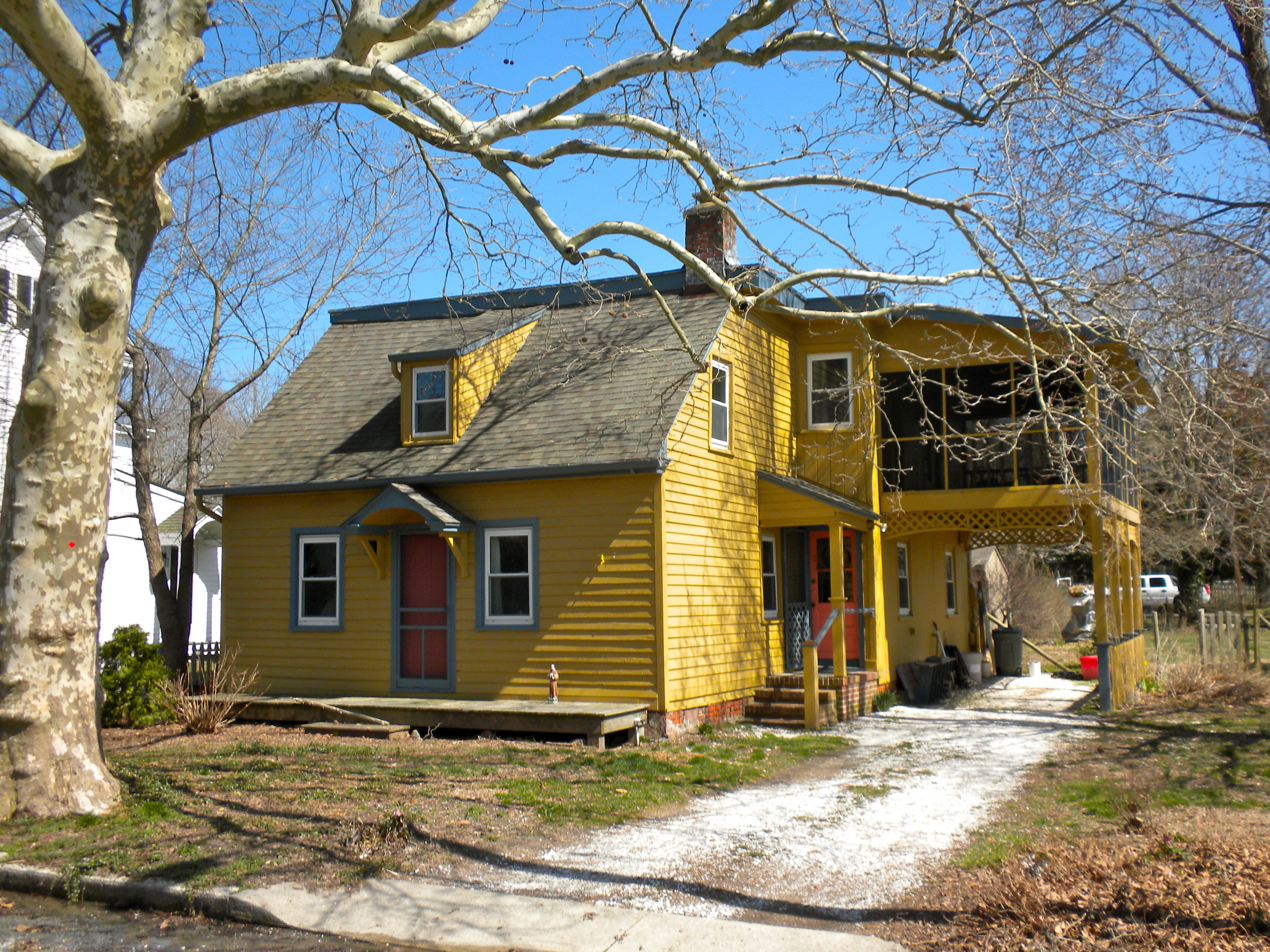
- Caesar Hoskins Log Cabin
- Motto(s): Small Town Charm, Along the Scenic Maurice River
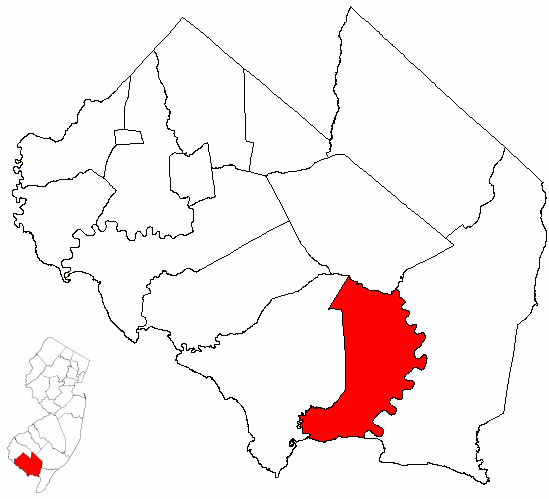
- Location of Commercial Township in Cumberland County highlighted in red (right). Inset map: Location of Cumberland County in New Jersey highlighted in red (left).

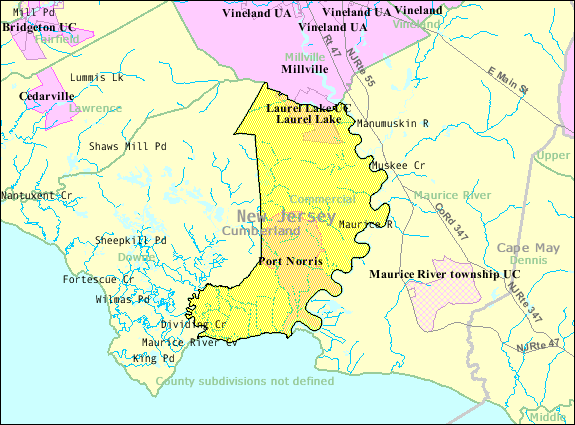
- Census Bureau map of Commercial Township, New Jersey

- Location in Cumberland County Location in New Jersey Location in the United States
- Coordinates: 39.273769°N 75.045343°W
- Country: United States
- State: New Jersey
- County: Cumberland
- Incorporated: February 27, 1874

Government
  - Type: Township
  - Body: Township Committee
  - Mayor: Joseph Klaudi (D, term ends December 31, 2026)
  - Municipal clerk: Heather Miller

Area
  - Total: 34.41 sq mi (89.13 km^{2})
  - Land: 31.92 sq mi (82.66 km^{2})
  - Water: 2.50 sq mi (6.47 km^{2}) 7.26%
  - Rank: 70th of 565 in state 7th of 14 in county
- Elevation: 13 ft (4.0 m)

Population (2020)
  - Total: 4,669
  - Estimate (2023): 4,643
  - Rank: 389th of 565 in state 7th of 14 in county
  - Density: 146.3/sq mi (56.5/km^{2})
  - Rank: 522nd of 565 in state 8th of 14 in county
- Time zone: UTC−05:00 (Eastern (EST))
  - Summer (DST): UTC−04:00 (Eastern (EDT))
- ZIP Code: 08349 – Port Norris
- Area code: 856
- FIPS code: 3401114710
- GNIS feature ID: 0882062
- Website: www.commercialtwp.com

Commercial Township is a township in Cumberland County, in the U.S. state of New Jersey. It is part of the Vineland-Bridgeton metropolitan statistical area. As of the 2020 United States census, the township's population was 4,669, a decrease of 509 (−9.8%) from the 2010 census count of 5,178, which in turn reflected a decline of 81 (−1.5%) from the 5,259 counted in the 2000 census.

Commercial Township was incorporated as a township by an act of the New Jersey Legislature on February 27, 1874, from portions of Downe Township. The township was named for its shellfish industry.

== Geography ==
According to the U.S. Census Bureau, the township had a total area of 34.41 square miles (89.13 km^{2}), including 31.91 square miles (82.66 km^{2}) of land and 2.50 square miles (6.47 km^{2}) of water (7.26%).

Laurel Lake (2020 Census population of 2,861), Port Norris (1,111), and Mauricetown (403) are unincorporated communities and census-designated places (CDPs) located within Commercial Township.

Other unincorporated communities, localities and place names located partially or completely within the township include Baileytown, Bivalve, Buckshutem, Haleyville, Lores Mill, North Port Norris and Shell Pile.

The township borders Downe Township, Maurice River Township, Millville and the Delaware Bay.

== Demographics ==
Historical population
Census	Pop.	Note	%±
1880	2,265		—
1890	2,344		3.5%
1900	2,982		27.2%
1910	2,604		−12.7%
1920	2,292		−12.0%
1930	2,873		25.3%
1940	2,822		−1.8%
1950	3,238		14.7%
1960	3,244		0.2%
1970	3,667		13.0%
1980	4,674		27.5%
1990	5,026		7.5%
2000	5,259		4.6%
2010	5,178		−1.5%
2020	4,669		−9.8%
2023 (est.)	4,643		−0.6%
Population sources: 1880–2000; 1880–1920 1880–1890; 1890–1910 1910–1930; 1940–2000 2000; 2010 2020

=== 2010 census ===
The 2010 United States census counted 5,178 people, 1,880 households, and 1,337 families in the township. The population density was 161.2 inhabitants per square mile (62.2/km^{2}). There were 2,115 housing units at an average density of 65.8 per square mile (25.4/km^{2}). The racial makeup was 83.72% (4,335) White, 10.24% (530) Black or African American, 0.35% (18) Native American, 0.52% (27) Asian, 0.00% (0) Pacific Islander, 1.53% (79) from other races, and 3.65% (189) from two or more races. Hispanic or Latino of any race were 6.10% (316) of the population.

Of the 1,880 households, 30.6% had children under the age of 18; 42.9% were married couples living together; 18.5% had a female householder with no husband present and 28.9% were non-families. Of all households, 22.4% were made up of individuals and 9.3% had someone living alone who was 65 years of age or older. The average household size was 2.74 and the average family size was 3.14.

25.3% of the population were under the age of 18, 9.2% from 18 to 24, 25.8% from 25 to 44, 28.0% from 45 to 64, and 11.7% who were 65 years of age or older. The median age was 37.3 years. For every 100 females, the population had 98.2 males. For every 100 females ages 18 and older there were 98.0 males.

The Census Bureau's 2006–2010 American Community Survey showed that (in 2010 inflation-adjusted dollars) median household income was $45,323 (with a margin of error of +/− $7,873) and the median family income was $46,790 (+/− $10,373). Males had a median income of $42,297 (+/− $6,069) versus $31,391 (+/− $5,851) for females. The per capita income for the borough was $19,242 (+/− $2,315). About 18.0% of families and 18.8% of the population were below the poverty line, including 20.9% of those under age 18 and 21.2% of those age 65 or over.

=== 2000 census ===
As of the 2000 United States census there were 5,259 people, 1,873 households, and 1,367 families residing in the township. The population density was 162.0 inhabitants per square mile (62.5/km^{2}). There were 2,171 housing units at an average density of 66.9 per square mile (25.8/km^{2}). The racial makeup of the township was 82.98% White, 13.42% African American, 0.42% Native American, 0.23% Asian, 0.02% Pacific Islander, 1.01% from other races, and 1.92% from two or more races. Hispanic or Latino of any race were 3.86% of the population.

There were 1,873 households, out of which 35.3% had children under the age of 18 living with them, 49.1% were married couples living together, 16.0% had a female householder with no husband present, and 21.0% were non-families. 21.4% of all households were made up of individuals, and 9.1% had someone living alone who was 65 years of age or older. The average household size was 2.80 and the average family size was 3.22.

In the township the population was spread out, with 28.3% under the age of 18, 9.3% from 18 to 24, 29.3% from 25 to 44, 20.8% from 45 to 64, and 12.3% who were 65 years of age or older. The median age was 34 years. For every 100 females, there were 97.0 males. For every 100 females age 18 and over, there were 95.0 males.

The median income for a household in the township was $34,960, and the median income for a family was $37,500. Males had a median income of $35,030 versus $21,610 for females. The per capita income for the township was $14,663. About 13.0% of families and 15.8% of the population were below the poverty line, including 21.3% of those under age 18 and 11.9% of those age 65 or over.

== Government ==
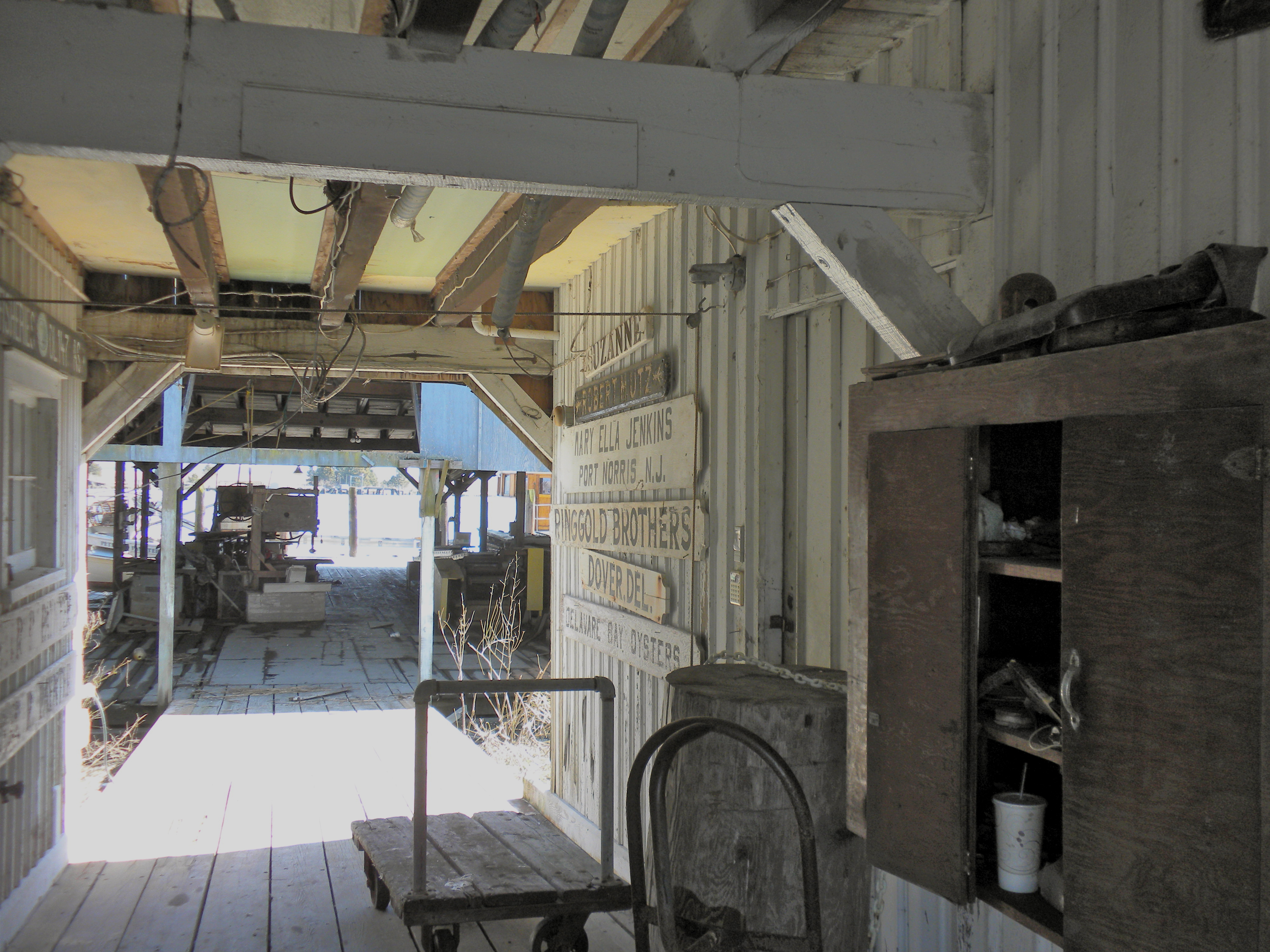
Bivalve Oyster Packing and Docks, south of Port Norris, are on the National Register of Historic Places

=== Local government ===
Commercial Township is governed under the Township form of New Jersey municipal government, one of 141 municipalities (of the 564) statewide that use this form, the second-most commonly used form of government in the state. The governing body is comprised of a three-member Township Committee, whose members are elected directly by the voters at-large in partisan elections to serve three-year terms of office on a staggered basis, with one seat coming up for election each year as part of the November general election in a three-year cycle. At an annual reorganization meeting, the Township Committee selects one of its members to serve as Mayor and another as Deputy Mayor, each serving a one-year term.

As of 2025, members of the Commercial Township Committee are Mayor Joseph Klaudi (R, term on committee ends December 31, 2027; term as mayor ends 2025), Deputy Mayor Warren "Mike" Vizzard (R, term on committee and as deputy mayor ends 2025) and Ronald L. Sutton Sr. (R, 2026).

After Mayor Judson Moore resigned from office in March 2016, Ronald Sutton was named as mayor to replace Moore and Fletcher Jamison shifted to deputy mayor.

In the November 2013 general election, Moore became the first candidate to win election running as an independent, while Ronald Sutton was elected to fill the vacant seat of Bill Riggin, who had resigned from office.

=== Federal, state and county representation ===
Commercial Township is located in the 2nd Congressional District and is part of New Jersey's 1st state legislative district.

For the 119th United States Congress, New Jersey's 2nd congressional district is represented by Jeff Van Drew (R, Dennis Township). New Jersey is represented in the United States Senate by Democrats Cory Booker (Newark, term ends 2027) and Andy Kim (Moorestown, term ends 2031).

For the 2026–2027 session, the 1st legislative district of the New Jersey Legislature is represented in the State Senate by Mike Testa (R, Vineland) and in the General Assembly by Antwan McClellan (R, Ocean City) and Erik K. Simonsen (R, Lower Township).

Cumberland County is governed by a Board of County Commissioners composed of seven members who are elected at large by the citizens of Cumberland County in partisan elections and serve staggered three-year terms in office, with either two or three seats coming up for election each year in a three-year cycle. Annually, the seven board members select a Director and Deputy Director for one-year terms. As of 2025, members of the Cumberland County Board of County Commissioners (with party affiliation, residence and term-end year listed in parentheses) are:

Douglas A. Albrecht (R, Vineland, 2025), Deputy Director Antonio Romero (R, Vineland, 2027), Sandra Taylor (R, Downe Township; 2026), Victoria Groetsch-Lods (R, Vineland, 2025), Arthur Marchand (R, Hopewell Township, 2026), James Sauro (R, Vineland, 2026) and Robert A. Austino (D, Bridgeton, 2027).

The county's constitutional officers are: Clerk Celeste Riley (D, Bridgeton, 2029), Sheriff Michael Donato (R, Bridgeton, 2026) and Surrogate Rudolph Luisi (R, Vineland, 2028).

=== Politics ===
As of March 2011, there were a total of 3,183 registered voters in Commercial Township, of which 1,004 (31.5%) were registered as Democrats, 568 (17.8%) were registered as Republicans and 1,608 (50.5%) were registered as Unaffiliated. There were 3 voters registered as Libertarians or Greens.

Gubernatorial election results for Commercial Township
Year	Republican		Democratic		Third party(ies)	
Year	No.	%	No.	%	No.	%
2025	781	59.66%	514	39.27%	14	1.07%
2021	718	64.22%	387	34.62%	13	1.16%
2017	419	46.87%	456	51.01%	19	2.13%
2013	691	60.88%	413	36.39%	31	2.73%
2009	446	44.64%	475	47.55%	78	7.81%
2005	449	41.69%	586	54.41%	42	3.90%

In the 2012 presidential election, Democrat Barack Obama received 57.6% of the vote (983 cast), ahead of Republican Mitt Romney with 41.1% (701 votes), and other candidates with 1.3% (23 votes), among the 1,726 ballots cast by the township's 3,270 registered voters (19 ballots were spoiled), for a turnout of 52.8%. In the 2008 presidential election, Democrat Barack Obama received 55.0% of the vote (1,032 cast), ahead of Republican John McCain, who received 41.7% (781 votes), with 1,875 ballots cast among the township's 3,151 registered voters, for a turnout of 59.5%. In the 2004 presidential election, Republican George W. Bush received 50.2% of the vote (849 ballots cast), outpolling Democrat John Kerry, who received 49.2% (832 votes), with 1,690 ballots cast among the township's 2,931 registered voters, for a turnout percentage of 57.7.

United States presidential election results for Commercial Township 2024 2020 2016 2012 2008 2004
Year	Republican		Democratic		Third party(ies)	
Year	No.	%	No.	%	No.	%
2024	1,191	63.22%	668	35.46%	25	1.33%
2020	1,184	58.99%	798	39.76%	25	1.25%
2016	985	57.67%	662	38.76%	61	3.57%
2012	701	41.07%	983	57.59%	23	1.35%
2008	781	41.65%	1,032	55.04%	62	3.31%
2004	849	50.24%	832	49.23%	9	0.53%

In the 2013 gubernatorial election, Republican Chris Christie received 60.9% of the vote (691 cast), ahead of Democrat Barbara Buono with 36.4% (413 votes), and other candidates with 2.7% (31 votes), among the 1,191 ballots cast by the township's 3,031 registered voters (56 ballots were spoiled), for a turnout of 39.3%. In the 2009 gubernatorial election, Democrat Jon Corzine received 46.5% of the vote (475 ballots cast), ahead of both Republican Chris Christie with 43.6% (446 votes) and Independent Chris Daggett with 6.0% (61 votes), with 1,022 ballots cast among the township's 3,017 registered voters, yielding a 33.9% turnout.

United States Senate election results for Commercial Township1
Year	Republican		Democratic		Third party(ies)	
Year	No.	%	No.	%	No.	%
2024	1,073	60.35%	657	36.95%	48	2.70%
2018	668	56.18%	462	38.86%	59	4.96%
2012	563	37.96%	873	58.87%	47	3.17%
2006	475	46.84%	501	49.41%	38	3.75%

United States Senate election results for Commercial Township2
Year	Republican		Democratic		Third party(ies)	
Year	No.	%	No.	%	No.	%
2020	1,057	54.60%	802	41.43%	77	3.98%
2014	394	48.11%	406	49.57%	19	2.32%
2013	278	51.39%	252	46.58%	11	2.03%
2008	623	38.65%	922	57.20%	67	4.16%

== Education ==
The Commercial Township School District serves public school students in pre-kindergarten through eighth grade. As of the 2022–23 school year, the district, comprised of one school, had an enrollment of 481 students and 39.0 classroom teachers (on an FTE basis), for a student–teacher ratio of 12.3:1.

Students in ninth through twelfth grades for public school attend Millville High School in Millville, together with students from Lawrence Township and Maurice River Township, as part of a sending/receiving relationship with the Millville Public Schools. As of the 2022–23 school year, the high school had an enrollment of 1,640 students and 70.0 classroom teachers (on an FTE basis), for a student–teacher ratio of 23.4:1.

Students are also eligible to attend Cumberland County Technical Education Center in Vineland, serving students from the entire county in its full-time technical training programs, which are offered without charge to students who are county residents.

== Transportation ==
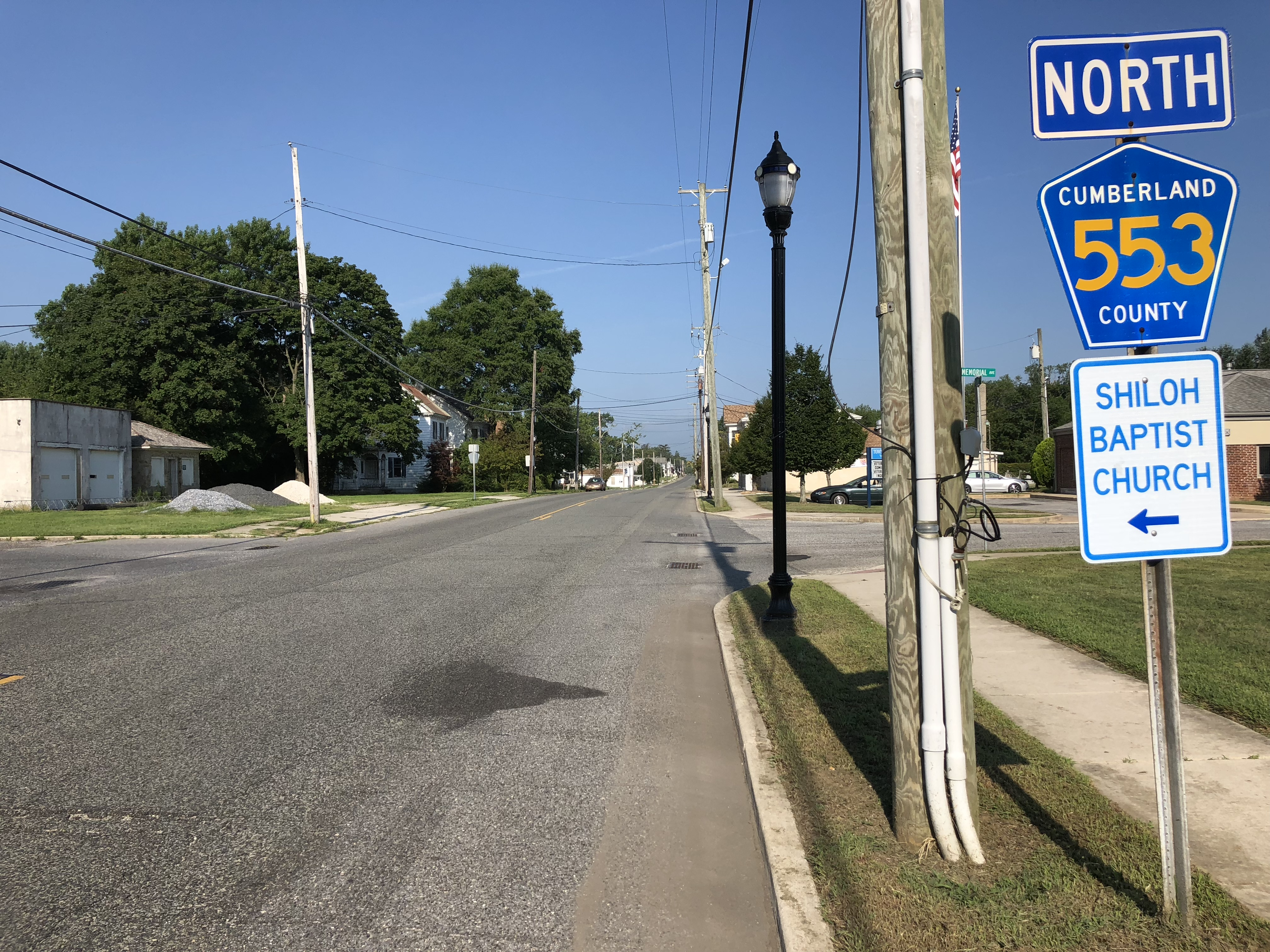
County Route 553 in Commercial Township

As of May 2010, the township had a total of 77.15 miles (124.16 km) of roadways, of which 44.08 miles (70.94 km) were maintained by the municipality and 33.07 miles (53.22 km) by Cumberland County.

County Route 553 is the most significant road serving Commercial Township.

== Notable people ==
People who were born in, residents of, or otherwise closely associated with Commercial Township include:

- Helen Gandy (1897–1988), secretary to J. Edgar Hoover, Director of the Federal Bureau of Investigation, for 54 years
- Elden H. Johnson (1921–1944), United States Army soldier who was awarded the Medal of Honor for his actions in World War II
- Henry C. Loudenslager (1852–1911), represented New Jersey's 1st congressional district from 1893 to 1911
- Larry Milbourne (born 1951), second baseman who played for 11 seasons in Major League Baseball
- Dallas Lore Sharp (1870–1929), author and university professor

== Points of interest ==
- Caesar Hoskins Log Cabin
