= Port Norris, New Jersey =

Populated place in Cumberland County, New Jersey, US

- Census-designated place
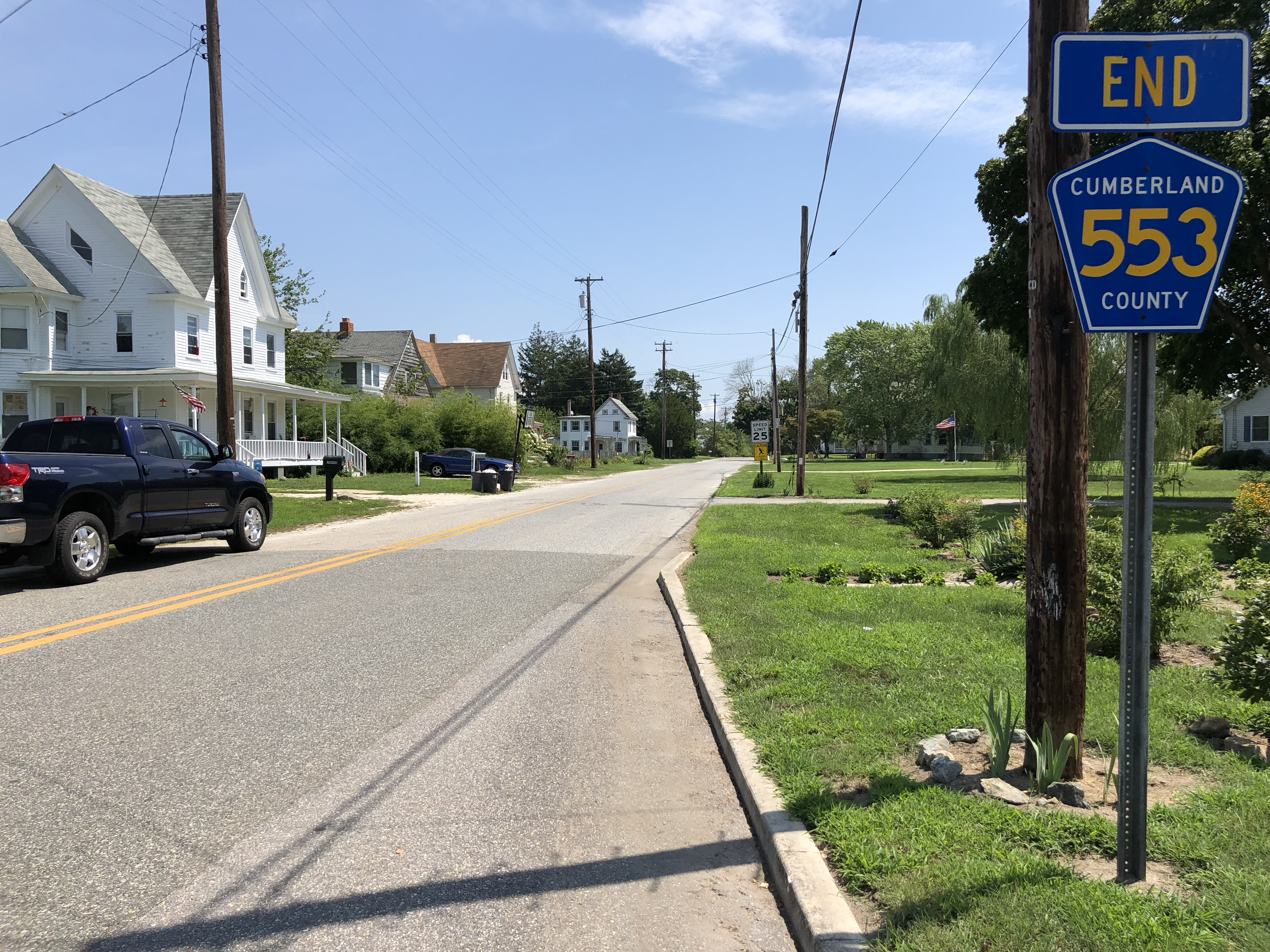
- The end of County Route 553 along Main Street near Ogden Avenue

- Map Location of Port Norris in Cumberland County highlighted in red (left). Inset map: Location of Cumberland County in New Jersey highlighted in orange (right).
- Coordinates: 39.250469°N 75.042457°W
- Country: United States
- State: New Jersey
- County: Cumberland
- Township: Commercial

Area
  - Total: 6.92 sq mi (17.93 km^{2})
  - Land: 6.38 sq mi (16.52 km^{2})
  - Water: 0.55 sq mi (1.42 km^{2}) 7.23%
- Elevation: 9.8 ft (3 m)

Population (2020)
  - Total: 1,111
  - Density: 174.2/sq mi (67.26/km^{2})
- Time zone: UTC−05:00 (Eastern (EST))
  - Summer (DST): UTC−04:00 (Eastern (EDT))
- ZIP Code: 08349
- Area code: 856
- FIPS code: 34-60510
- GNIS feature ID: 02389697

Port Norris is an unincorporated community and census-designated place (CDP) located within Commercial Township, in Cumberland County, in the U.S. state of New Jersey. It is part of the Vineland–Millville–Bridgeton Primary Metropolitan Statistical Area for statistical purposes. As of the 2020 census, Port Norris had a population of 1,111. Legislation was passed in 1911, allowing voters to choose to incorporate Port Norris as a borough, independent from Commercial Township, but it was defeated in a referendum.

== History ==
On a late night in September 2007, an undercover operation to put a halt to the drag racing was commenced, and up to 62 people were caught participating in a major drag race gathering. About 208 summonses were issued and several cars were impounded.

== Geography ==
According to the United States Census Bureau, the CDP had a total area of 6.829 square miles (17.69 km^{2}), including 6.335 square miles (16.41 km^{2}) of land and 0.494 square miles (1.28 km^{2}) of water (7.23%). Port Norris is located near the mouth of the Maurice River.

== Demographics ==
Historical population
Census	Pop.	Note	%±
1950	1,735		—
1960	1,789		3.1%
1970	1,955		9.3%
1980	1,730		−11.5%
1990	1,701		−1.7%
2000	1,507		−11.4%
2010	1,377		−8.6%
2020	1,111		−19.3%
Population sources: 1950 1960 1970; 1980 1990 2000; 2010 2020

Port Norris first appeared as an unincorporated community in the 1950 U.S. census; and then was listed as a census designated place in the 1980 U.S. census.

=== 2020 census ===
Port Norris CDP, New Jersey – Racial and ethnic composition Note: the US Census treats Hispanic/Latino as an ethnic category. This table excludes Latinos from the racial categories and assigns them to a separate category. Hispanics/Latinos may be of any race.
Race / Ethnicity (NH = Non-Hispanic)	Pop 2000	Pop 2010	Pop 2020	% 2000	% 2010	% 2020
White alone (NH)	854	871	673	56.67%	63.25%	60.58%
Black or African American alone (NH)	548	348	285	36.36%	25.27%	25.65%
Native American or Alaska Native alone (NH)	2	4	3	0.13%	0.29%	0.27%
Asian alone (NH)	2	9	0	0.13%	0.65%	0.00%
Native Hawaiian or Pacific Islander alone (NH)	0	0	0	0.00%	0.00%	0.00%
Other race alone (NH)	0	2	6	0.00%	0.15%	0.54%
Mixed race or Multiracial (NH)	31	56	39	2.06%	4.07%	3.51%
Hispanic or Latino (any race)	70	87	105	4.64%	6.32%	9.45%
Total	1,507	1,377	1,111	100.00%	100.00%	100.00%

=== 2010 census ===
The 2010 United States census counted 1,377 people, 481 households, and 355 families in the CDP. The population density was 217.4 people per square mile (83.9 people/km^{2}). There were 552 housing units at an average density of 87.1 units per square mile (33.6 units/km^{2}). The racial makeup was 66.23% (912) White, 26.22% (361) Black or African American, 0.29% (4) Native American, 0.73% (10) Asian, 0.00% (0) Pacific Islander, 1.89% (26) from other races, and 4.65% (64) from two or more races. Hispanic or Latino of any race were 6.32% (87) of the population.

Of the 481 households, 29.5% had children under the age of 18; 43.7% were married couples living together; 23.3% had a female householder with no husband present and 26.2% were non-families. Of all households, 20.4% were made up of individuals and 9.8% had someone living alone who was 65 years of age or older. The average household size was 2.80 and the average family size was 3.18.

24.8% of the population were under the age of 18, 9.8% from 18 to 24, 22.4% from 25 to 44, 28.8% from 45 to 64, and 14.2% who were 65 years of age or older. The median age was 37.5 years. For every 100 females, the population had 96.4 males. For every 100 females ages 18 and older there were 94.4 males.

=== 2000 census ===
As of the 2000 United States census there were 1,507 people, 514 households, and 380 families residing in the CDP. The population density was 91.3 people/km^{2} (236 people/mi^{2}). There were 596 housing units at an average density of 36.1 units/km^{2} (93 units/mi^{2}). The racial makeup of the CDP was 58.26% White, 37.09% African American, 0.13% Native American, 0.20% Asian, 1.73% from other races, and 2.59% from two or more races. Hispanic or Latino of any race were 4.64% of the population.

There were 514 households, out of which 30.5% had children under the age of 18 living with them, 49.8% were married couples living together, 18.7% had a female householder with no husband present, and 25.9% were non-families. 20.6% of all households were made up of individuals, and 11.7% had someone living alone who was 65 years of age or older. The average household size was 2.92 and the average family size was 3.36.

In the CDP the population was spread out, with 27.4% under the age of 18, 7.9% from 18 to 24, 27.0% from 25 to 44, 20.8% from 45 to 64, and 16.9% who were 65 years of age or older. The median age was 37 years. For every 100 females, there were 92.0 males. For every 100 females age 18 and over, there were 87.3 males.

The median income for a household in the CDP was $38,194, and the median income for a family was $42,813. Males had a median income of $36,513 versus $22,176 for females. The per capita income for the CDP was $16,195. About 14.0% of families and 16.1% of the population were below the poverty line, including 20.6% of those under age 18 and 7.2% of those age 65 or over.

== Education ==
Students are zoned to Commercial Township School District.

== Bivalve and Shell Pile ==
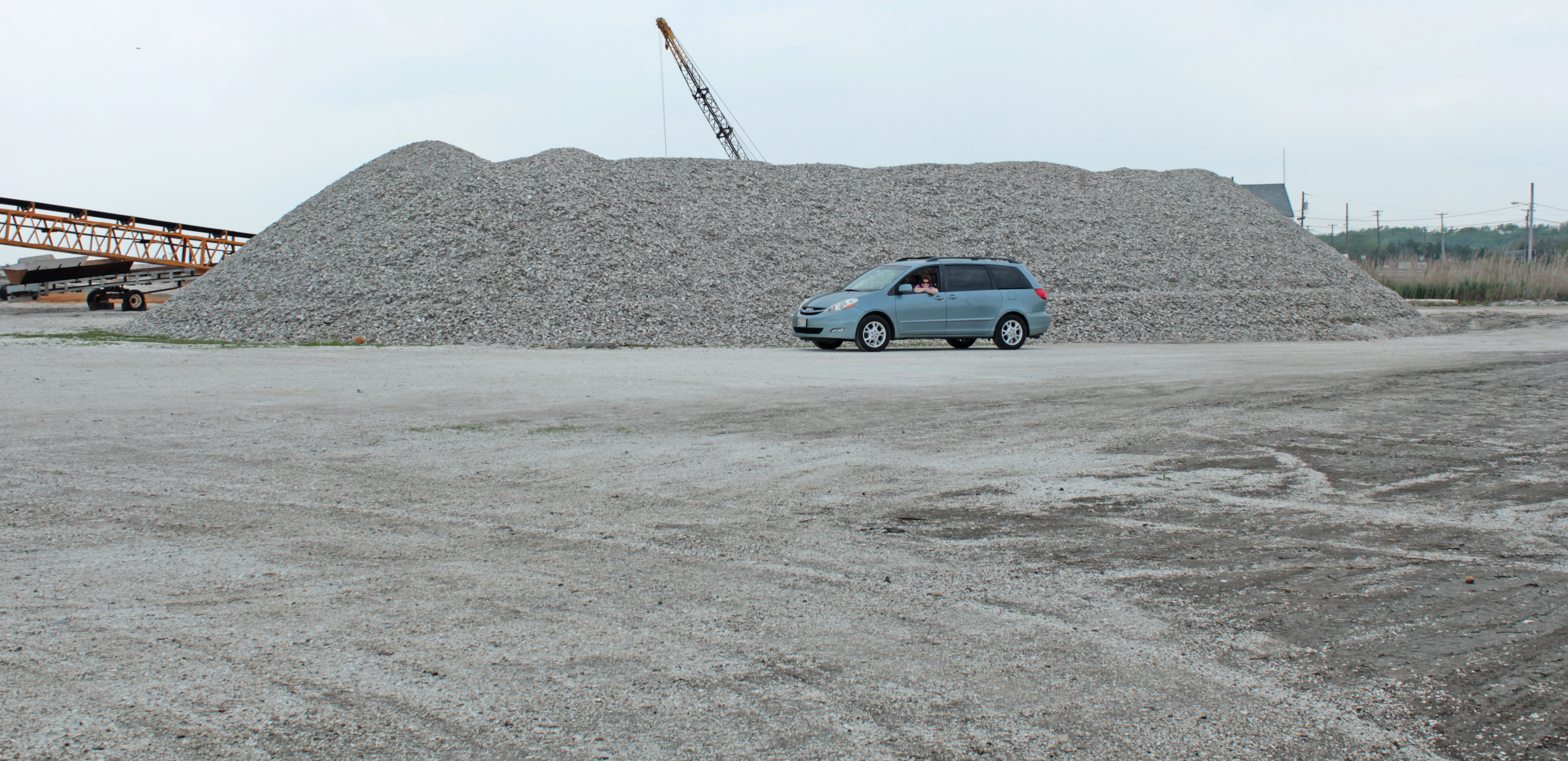
A massive pile of oyster shells in Shell Pile

In the Port Norris area are the communities of Bivalve and Shell Pile. They were both centers of the oystering industry, as their names imply. Shell Pile is described in a 1939 excerpt of a WPA Guidebook to New Jersey:

"Shell Pile is named for the great heaps of oyster shells stacked outside the packing sheds. This is a community of about 1,000 Negroes living in wooden barracks erected on stilts over the salt marshes. Negroes here live their own lives in their own way, and present a united and rather hostile front from the rest of the world. Strange whites are not welcomed in Shell Pile."

The oystering industry reached its peak in 1955, declining by 1957 due to oyster pathogen Haplosporidium nelsoni (MSX) which killed 90% of the oysters. Bivalve and Shell Pile are now mostly ghost towns, with a combined population of less than 50.

In Cruising the Chesapeake; a Gunkholer's Guide, William Shellenberger says:

As the name indicates this is an oystering port, probably the busiest on the Delaware. Don't look for typical pleasure-boat facilities - there aren't any. However, you may be able to find dock space on either shore where you can tie up.
