= List of census-designated places in New Jersey =

This is a list of census-designated places in New Jersey. As of the 2010 United States census, the U.S. state of New Jersey had 221 CDPs. Where the CDP is split between townships, the portion of the CDP's total population within each township is listed separately. There is also a separate section listing former census designated places.

CDPs are unincorporated communities lacking elected municipal officers and boundaries with legal status. The term "census designated place" has been used as an official classification by the U.S. Census Bureau since 1980. Prior to that, select unincorporated communities were surveyed in the U.S. Census.

While the vast majority of CDPs are located entirely within a single municipality, there are 30 CDPs that are split between different townships:

- Auburn – Oldmans Township and Pilesgrove Township
- Belle Mead – HIllsborough Township and Montgomery Township
- Blackwells Mills – Franklin Township and Hillsborough Township
- Crandon Lakes – Hampton and Stillwater
- Fort Dix – New Hanover (5,951), Pemberton (1,765) and Springfield (0)
- Green Village – Chatham Township and Harding Township
- Grenloch – Gloucester Township and Washington Township
- Hainesburg – Blairstown and Knowlton Township
- The Hills – Bedminster and Bernards Township
- Kean University – Hillside and Union
- Kingston – South Brunswick (1,222) and Franklin (271).
- Lake Mohawk – Byram (1,824) and Sparta (8,092)
- Lower Berkshire Valley – Jefferson Township and Roxbury
- McGuire AFB – New Hanover (737) and North Hanover (2,973)
- Milmay – Buena Vista Township and Maurice River Township
- Montclair State University – Little Falls and Montclair
- Mount Tabor – Denville and Parsippany-Troy Hills
- Neshanic Station – Branchburg and Readington Township
- Newfoundland – Jefferson Township and West Milford
- Oak Ridge – Jefferson Township and West Milford
- Ocean Acres – Barnegat (925) and Stafford (15,217)
- Pottersville – Bedminster and Tewksbury Township
- Roadstown – Hopewell Township and Stow Creek Township
- Richwood – Harrison (3,400) and Mantua (59)
- Rio Grande – Lower Township and Middle Township
- Rutgers University-Livingston Campus – Edison and Piscataway
- Sewell – Mantua and Washington
- Silver Lake – Belleville and Bloomfield
- Sheppards Mill – Greenwich Township and Hopewell Township
- Upper Greenwood Lake – West Milford Township and Vernon Township

Three CDPs share the same name but are located in different counties:

- Silver Lake (Essex County), Silver Lake (Warren County) and Silver Lake (Cumberland County)

Nine CDPs are split between two counties:

- Grenloch – Camden County and Gloucester County
- Kingston – Middlesex County and Somerset County
- Milmay – Atlantic County and Cumberland County
- Montclair State University – Passaic County and Essex County
- Neshanic Station – Hunterdon County and Somerset County
- Newfoundland – Morris County and Passaic County
- Oak Ridge – Morris County and Passaic County
- Pottersville – Hunterdon County and Somerset County
- Upper Greenwood Lake – Passaic County and Sussex County

== Census-designated places in New Jersey ==
Census-designated places in New Jersey
CDP name	County	Parent Township	Population (2020)	Population (2010)	Population (2000)	Population (1990)	Population (1980)	Population notes	Housing Units (2010)	Total (sq mi)	Land (sq mi)	Water (sq mi)	Coordinates	FIPS code	ANSI code
Absecon Highlands	Atlantic	Galloway	1,414	x	x	x	x								
Allamuchy	Warren	Allamuchy	156	78	x	x	x		35	0.082	0.081	0.001	40.922363, -74.81256	3400640	2583964
Allenwood	Monmouth	Wall	954	925	935	x	x		318	1.847	1.732	0.115	40.135366, -74.09805	3400790	2389124
Alloway	Salem	Alloway	1,296	1,402	1,128	1,371	1,370		533	7.122	6.868	0.254	39.561534, -75.34928	3400850	2389125
Ampere North	Essex	Bloomfield	5,132	x	x	x	x								2806225
Anderson	Warren	Mansfield	306	342	x	x	x		155	0.944	0.941	0.003	40.761867, -74.929543	3401300	2583965
Annandale	Hunterdon	Clinton	1,663	1,695	1,276	1,074	1,040		692	1.452	1.452	0	40.646838, -74.888177	3401480	2389137
Arrowhead Lake	Cumberland	Stow Creek	126	x	x	x	x								2806227
Asbury	Warren	Franklin	270	273	x	x	x		108	0.7	0.694	0.006	40.698936, -75.007826	3401900	2583966
Ashland	Camden	Cherry Hill	8,513	8,302	8,375	x	x		3,215	2.919	2.914	0.005	39.876228, -75.008265	3401990	2389152
Atco	Camden	Waterford	9,058	x	x	x	x								
Auburn	Salem	Oldmans / Pilesgrove	1,057	x	x	x	x								
Avenel	Middlesex	Woodbridge	16,920	17,011	17,552	15,504	x		5,379	3.532	3.517	0.015	40.584334, -74.271626	3402350	2389160
Barclay	Camden	Cherry Hill	4,656	4,428	x	x	x		1,651	1.659	1.659	0	39.901243, -75.000829	3402880	2389172
Bargaintown	Atlantic	Egg Harbor	5,360	x	x	x	x								
Barnegat	Ocean	Barnegat	3,894	2,817	1,690	1,160	1,012		1,132	2.667	2.655	0.012	39.753903, -74.221654	3403040	2389174
Basking Ridge	Somerset	Bernards	7,196	x	x	x	x	Listed as an unincorporated community in the 1950 U.S. census (pop. 1,899) and the 1960 U.S. census (pop. 2,438).							
Beach Haven West	Ocean	Stafford	4,143	3,896	4,444	4,237	3,020		4,571	2.143	1.597	0.546	39.670428, -74.233123	3404120	2389182
Beattystown	Warren	Mansfield	4,701	4,554	3,223	x	x		2,091	3.036	3.011	0.025	40.819412, -74.853676	3404252	2389184
Beckett	Gloucester	Logan	4,834	4,847	4,726	3,815	x		1,662	1.866	1.744	0.122	39.750105, -75.36482	3404400	2389189
Bedminster	Somerset	Bedminster	1,244	x	x	x	x								
Beesleys Point	Cape May	Upper	816	x	x	x	x								
Belford	Monmouth	Middletown	1,648	1,768	1,340	x	x	Listed as and unincorporated community in the 1950 U.S. census (pop. 1,832). The community was not listed in the 1960 U.S. census or the 1970 U.S. census.	616	1.313	1.279	0.034	40.428075, -74.078221	3404600	2389194
Belle Mead	Somerset	Hillsborough / Montgomery	5,569	216	x	x	x		80	0.74	0.74	0	40.462445, -74.6744	3404630	2583967
Belleplain	Cape May	Dennis	614	597	x	x	x		230	7.405	7.394	0.011	39.260327, -74.873713	3404660	2629044
Blackwells Mills	Somerset	Franklin / Hillsborough	9,473	803	x	x	x		241	1.296	1.222	0.074	40.483582, -74.567789	3406025	2583968
Blackwood	Camden	Gloucester	4,622	4,545	4,692	5,120	5,219	Listed as and unincorporated community in the 1950 U.S. census (pop. 1,344). The community was not listed in the 1960 U.S. census or the 1970 U.S. census.	1,800	1.235	1.226	0.009	39.799065, -75.063111	3406040	2389213
Blairstown	Warren	Blairstown	493	515	x	x	x		219	0.432	0.425	0.007	40.987381, -74.954581	3406130	2583969
Blawenburg	Somerset	Montgomery	287	280	x	x	x		115	0.612	0.608	0.004	40.402646, -74.698565	3406190	2583970
Bradley Gardens	Somerset	Bridgewater	14,077	14,206	x	x	x		5,081	4.616	4.487	0.129	40.572095, -74.663381	3407000	2583971
Brainards	Warren	Harmony	194	202	x	x	x		79	0.184	0.184	0	40.771764, -75.169933	3407120	2583972
Brass Castle	Warren	Washington	1,536	1,555	1,507	1,419	x		575	2.934	2.918	0.016	40.763125, -75.026248	3407360	2389234
Bridgeport	Gloucester	Logan	389	x	x	x	x								
Bridgeville	Warren	White	229	106	x	x	x		46	0.191	0.191	0	40.837104, -75.024417	3407660	2583973
Bridgewater Center	Somerset	Bridgewater	6,082	x	x	x	x								
Broadway	Warren	Franklin	213	244	x	x	x		127	0.371	0.371	0	40.73706, -75.048628	3408020	2583974
Brookdale	Essex	Bloomfield	9,854	9,239	x	x	x		3,583	1.607	1.603	0.004	40.834944, -74.179777	3408110	2583975
Brookfield	Warren	White	727	675	x	x	x		502	0.212	0.211	0.001	40.817384, -75.060848	3408140	2583976
Brookside	Morris	Mendham	1,737	x	x	x	x								
Browns Mills	Burlington	Pemberton	10,734	11,223	11,257	11,429	10,568	Listed as an unincorporated place in the 1970 U.S. census (pop. 7,144).	4,268	5.612	5.367	0.245	39.973499, -74.569492	3408455	2389252
Brownville	Middlesex	Old Bridge	2,383	2,383	2,660	x	x		1,028	1.003	1.002	0.001	40.399361, -74.29555	3408492	2389253
Budd Lake	Morris	Mount Olive	9,784	8,968	7,272	8,100	6,523	Listed as an unincorporated place in the 1950 U.S. census (pop. 1,032), 1960 U.S. census (pop. 1,520), and 1970 U.S. census (pop. 3,168).	3,423	6.424	5.443	0.981	40.873494, -74.736828	3408620	2389258
Burleigh	Cape May	Middle	766	725	x	x	x		321	1.55	1.518	0.032	39.047486, -74.846665	3408890	2583977
Buttzville	Warren	White	205	146	x	x	x		72	0.283	0.282	0.001	40.829846, -75.004178	3409100	2583978
Byram Center	Sussex	Byram	2,232	90	x	x	x		40	1.117	1.117	0	40.93989, -74.717073	3409170	2583979
Cape May Court House	Cape May	Middle	5,573	5,338	4,704	4,426	3,597	Listed as an unincorporated place in the 1950 U.S. census (pop. 1,093), 1960 U.S. census (pop. 1,749), and 1970 U.S. census (pop. 2,062).	2,603	9.899	8.926	0.973	39.07892, -74.820866	3410300	2389275
Carlls Corner	Cumberland	Upper Deerfield	911	x	x	x	x								
Carneys Point	Salem	Carneys Point	7,841	7,382	6,914	7,686	7,574		3,217	8.771	8.332	0.439	39.705469, -75.468143	3410600	2389281
Cedar Glen Lakes	Ocean	Manchester	1,517	1,421	1,617	1,611	1,987		1,234	0.699	0.693	0.006	39.953737, -74.400284	3411140	2389291
Cedar Glen West	Ocean	Manchester	1,379	1,267	1,376	1,396	x		985	1.07	1.059	0.011	40.038163, -74.28575	3411155	2389292
Cedar Knolls	Morris	Hanover	4,082	x	x	x	x								
Cedarville	Cumberland	Lawrence	702	776	793	x	x	Listed as an unincorporated community in the 1950 U.S. census (pop. 1,009) and the 1960 U.S. census (pop. 1,095).	300	2.277	2.236	0.041	39.338571, -75.214506	3411410	2389294
Centre Grove	Cumberland	Lawrence	1,281	x	x	x	x								
Cherry Hill Mall	Camden	Cherry Hill	14,805	14,171	13,238	x	x		5,941	3.646	3.642	0.004	39.938885, -75.011804	3412385	2389309
Clearbrook	Middlesex	Monroe	2,909	2,667	3,053	x	x		2,006	0.885	0.874	0.011	40.309995, -74.464629	3413399	2389330
Cliffwood Beach	Monmouth	Aberdeen	3,036	3,194	3,538	3,543	x	Listed as an unincorporated community in the 1950 U.S. census (pop. 1,448). It did not appear in the 1960 U.S. census. Listed as an unincorporated community under the name Cliffwood-Cliffwood Beach in the 1970 U.S. census (pop. 7,056). It did not appear in the 1980 U.S. census.	1,165	0.96	0.908	0.052	40.443266, -74.21796	3413630	2389331
Clyde	Somerset	Franklin	243	213	x	x	x		73	0.383	0.383	0	40.487341, -74.513189	3413990	2583980
Collings Lakes	Atlantic	Buena Vista	1,501	1,706	1,726	2,046	2,093		605	0.701	0.639	0.062	39.594668, -74.888626	3414230	2389344
Cologne	Atlantic	Galloway	1,461	x	x	x	x								
Colonia	Middlesex	Woodbridge	18,609	17,795	17,811	18,238	x		6,321	3.914	3.91	0.004	40.594133, -74.31377	3414380	2389346
Columbia	Warren	Knowlton	215	229	x	x	x		85	0.126	0.1	0.026	40.925868, -75.094062	3414590	2583981
Concordia	Middlesex	Monroe	2,455	3,092	3,658	2,683	x		2,261	1.065	1.039	0.026	40.312616, -74.44839	3414758	2389352
Connecticut Farms	Union	Union	545	x	x	x	x								
Cookstown	Burlington	New Hanover	900	x	x	x	x								
Country Lake Estates	Burlington	Pemberton	4,054	3,943	4,012	4,492	3,739		1,482	1.36	1.096	0.264	39.948988, -74.537929	3415250	2389364
Cranbury	Middlesex	Cranbury	2,200	2,181	2,008	x	1,255	Listed as an unincorporated community in the 1960 U.S. census (pop. 1,038) and under the name Cranbury Center in the 1970 U.S. census (pop. 1,253). Deleted after the 1980 U.S. census. Relisted in the 2000 U.S. census.	745	1.218	1.199	0.019	40.313448, -74.520224	3415520	2389369
Crandon Lakes	Sussex	Hampton / Stillwater	1,120	1,178	1,180	1,177	1,083		514	2.675	2.553	0.122	41.122688, -74.840523	3415610	2389370
Cranford	Union	Cranford	2,032	x	x	x	x								
Cream Ridge	Monmouth	Upper Freehold	630	x	x	x	x								
Crestwood Village	Ocean	Manchester	8,426	7,907	8,392	8,030	7,965		6,702	4.358	4.297	0.061	39.955606, -74.35323	3415910	2389373
Crosswicks	Burlington	Chesterfield	849	x	x	x	x								
Cumberland-Hesstown	Cumberland	Maurice River	315	x	x	x	x								
Dayton	Middlesex	South Brunswick	8,138	7,063	6,235	4,321	x		2,347	2.102	2.099	0.003	40.381014, -74.513355	3416630	2389397
Deans	Middlesex	South Brunswick	1,615	x	x	x	x								
Deerfield Street	Cumberland	Upper Deerfield	230	x	x	x	x								
Delaware	Warren	Knowlton	173	150	x	x	x		70	0.41	0.38	0.03	40.892562, -75.0693	3417200	2583982
Delaware Park	Warren	Lopatcong	739	700	x	x	x		278	0.246	0.246	0	40.705109, -75.188281	3417260	2583983
Delmont	Cumberland	Maurice River	122	x	x	x	x								
Dennisville	Cape May	Dennis	830	x	x	x	x								
Diamond Beach	Cape May	Lower	203	136	218	x	x		845	0.157	0.157	0	38.958852, -74.852009	3417815	2389406
Dividing Creek	Cumberland	Downe	345	x	x	x	x								
Dorchester	Cumberland	Maurice River	291	x	x	x	x								
Dorothy	Atlantic	Weymouth	1,057	x	x	x	x								
Dover Beaches North	Ocean	Toms River	1,277	1,239	1,785	x	x		4,071	1.587	0.922	0.665	39.991931, -74.07168	3418148	2389413
Dover Beaches South	Ocean	Toms River	1,331	1,209	1,594	x	x		2,658	1.03	0.62	0.41	39.955143, -74.07961	3418151	2389414
Dutch Neck	Cumberland	Hopewell	123	x	x	x	x								
East Franklin	Somerset	Franklin	9,788	8,669	x	x	x		2,646	1.088	1.086	0.002	40.492886, -74.471123	3419130	2583984
East Freehold	Monmouth	Freehold	4,987	4,894	4,936	3,842	2,990		1,685	2.973	2.965	0.008	40.275752, -74.241309	3419150	2389430
East Millstone	Somerset	Franklin	588	579	x	x	x		246	2.296	2.234	0.062	40.496444, -74.565986	3419330	2583985
East Rocky Hill	Somerset	Franklin	468	469	x	x	x		172	4.252	4.165	0.087	40.415133, -74.617903	3419490	2583986
East Vineland	Atlantic	Buena Vista	925	x	x	x	x								
Echelon	Camden	Voorhees	11,896	10,743	10,440	x	x		5,469	2.836	2.812	0.024	39.847836, -74.997249	3419900	2389457
Ellisburg	Camden	Cherry Hill	4,601	4,413	x	x	x		1,976	0.905	0.905	0	39.919889, -75.009336	3421120	2583987
Elwood	Atlantic	Mullica	1,215	1,437	1,392	1,487	1,538	Listed as Elwood-Magnolia in the 1980 U.S. census	477	3.206	3.205	0.001	39.569375, -74.707921	3421420	2389040
Encore at Monroe	Middlesex	Monroe	625	x	x	x	x								
English Creek	Atlantic	Egg Harbor	3,364	x	x	x	x								
Erma	Cape May	Lower	2,031	2,134	2,088	2,045	1,774		920	3.36	3.26	0.1	38.996931, -74.891122	3421660	2389049
Fairton	Cumberland	Fairfield	1,060	1,264	2,253	1,359	1,107		573	2.988	2.86	0.128	39.373352, -75.208845	3422530	2389066
Fairview	Monmouth	Middletown	3,731	3,806	3,942	3,853	x	Listed as an unincorporated community in the 1950 U.S. census (pop. 1,717) under the name Fairview-River Plaza which included the neighboring community of River Plaza.	1,346	1.289	1.28	0.009	40.365312, -74.080588	3422740	2389068
Finderne	Somerset	Bridgewater	6,392	5,600	x	x	x		2,324	4.336	4.095	0.241	40.561278, -74.574237	3423310	2583988
Finesville	Warren	Pohatcong	364	175	x	x	x		87	0.325	0.325	0	40.611199, -75.170672	3423340	2583989
Flagtown	Somerset	Hillsborough	1,070	x	x	x	x								
Flanders	Morris	Mount Olive	9,832	x	x	x	x								
Florence	Burlington	Florence	4,704	4,426	x	x	x		1,998	1.49	1.263	0.227	40.11916, -74.808773	3423880	2389090
Fords	Middlesex	Woodbridge	12,941	15,187	15,032	14,392	x		5,675	2.637	2.633	0.004	40.543794, -74.31292	3424030	2389094
Forked River	Ocean	Lacey	5,274	5,244	4,914	4,243	x	Listed as and unincorporated community in the 1970 U.S. census (pop. 1,422). Not listed in the 1980 U.S. census.	2,610	10.336	2.723	7.613	39.796991, -74.104637	3424180	2389100
Forsgate	Middlesex	Monroe	2,056	x	x	x	x								
Fort Dix	Burlington	New Hanover / Pemberton / Springfield	6,508	7,716	7,464	10,205	14,297	Listed as and unincorporated community in the 1970 U.S. census (pop. 26,290).	898	10.389	10.262	0.127	40.005611, -74.611072	3424300	2389104
Fortescue	Cumberland	Downe	189	x	x	x	x								
Franklin Center	Somerset	Franklin	6,803	4,460	x	x	x		2,141	6.682	6.579	0.103	40.531534, -74.54141	3424965	2583990
Franklin Park	Somerset	Franklin	13,430	13,295	x	x	x		5,529	2.607	2.605	0.002	40.444481, -74.542572	3425020	2583991
Franklinville	Gloucester	Franklin	1,927	x	x	x	x								
Gandys Beach	Cumberland	Downe	25	x	x	x	x								
Germania	Atlantic	Galloway	297	x	x	x	x								
Gibbstown	Gloucester	Greenwich	3,822	3,739	3,758	3,902	x	Listed as an unincorporated community in the 1950 U.S. census (pop. 2,546) and the 1960 U.S. census (pop. 2,820).	1,551	1.642	1.642	0	39.82454, -75.278082	3426100	2389839
Gillette	Morris	Long Hill	2,956	x	x	x	x								
Glendora	Camden	Gloucester	4,784	4,750	4,907	5,201	5,632		1,976	1.062	1.04	0.022	39.840937, -75.067211	3426520	2389851
Golden Triangle	Camden	Cherry Hill	4,769	4,145	3,511	x	x		1,826	2.949	2.837	0.112	39.93289, -75.03975	3426902	2389860
Goshen	Cape May	Middle	400	x	x	x	x								
Gouldtown	Cumberland	Fairfield	1,601	x	x	x	x								
Great Meadows	Warren	Independence	305	303	x	x	x		113	1.579	1.565	0.014	40.875812, -74.896582	3427360	2583992
Great Notch	Passaic	Little Falls	3,289	x	x	x	x								
Green Knoll	Somerset	Bridgewater	6,594	6,200	x	x	x		2,521	4.71	4.707	0.003	40.604725, -74.614511	3427840	2583993
Green Village	Morris	Chatham / Harding	1,103	x	x	x	x								
Greentree	Camden	Cherry Hill	12,012	11,367	11,536	x	x		4,134	4.666	4.659	0.007	39.898668, -74.96168	3427995	2389878
Greenwich	Warren	Greenwich	2,558	2,755	x	x	x		818	0.907	0.907	0	40.684907, -75.133821	3428250	2583994
Greenwich	Cumberland	Greenwich	251	x	x	x	x								
Grenloch	Camden / Gloucester	Gloucester / Washington	863	x	x	x	x								
Griggstown	Somerset	Franklin	835	819	x	x	x		364	2.519	2.447	0.072	40.439868, -74.598319	3428470	2583995
Groveville	Mercer	Hamilton	3,106	2,945	x	x	x		1,093	2.16	2.123	0.037	40.170048, -74.651278	3428620	2583996
Hainesburg	Warren	Blairstown / Knowlton	422	91	x	x	x		36	0.156	0.155	0.001	40.956141, -75.062061	3428920	2583997
Hamilton Square	Mercer	Hamilton	12,679	12,784	x	x	x		4,618	4.367	4.343	0.024	40.225029, -74.65048	3429370	2583998
Hancock's Bridge	Salem	Lower Alloways Creek	155	254	x	x	x		103	0.213	0.206	0.007	39.50562, -75.462261	3429520	2583999
Harlingen	Somerset	Montgomery	430	297	x	x	x		98	0.717	0.717	0	40.449363, -74.658505	3429940	2584000
Harmony	Warren	Harmony	374	441	x	x	x		180	1.24	1.24	0	40.750125, -75.140036	3430060	2584001
Harrisonville	Gloucester	South Harrison	306	x	x	x	x								
Heathcote	Middlesex	South Brunswick	7,154	5,821	4,755	3,112	x		2,427	2.592	2.585	0.007	40.389933, -74.57293	3430738	2389913
Heislerville	Cumberland	Maurice River	227	x	x	x	x								
Hewitt	Passaic	West Milford	1,912	x	x	x	x								
Hibernia	Morris	Rockaway	208	x	x	x	x								
Highland Lakes	Sussex	Vernon	4,816	4,933	5,051	4,550	2,888		2,342	6.099	5.071	1.028	41.174024, -74.455183	3431405	2389926
Hillsborough	Somerset	Hillsborough	22,214	x	x	x	x		x						
Holiday City South	Ocean	Berkeley	4,124	3,689	4,047	5,452	x		2,460	1.983	1.961	0.022	39.954094, -74.237294	3432418	2389941
Holiday City-Berkeley	Ocean	Berkeley	12,943	12,831	13,884	14,293	9,019		9,023	5.816	5.752	0.064	39.964154, -74.277814	3432415	2389942
Holiday Heights	Ocean	Berkeley	2,135	2,099	2,389	703	x		1,417	4.944	4.944	0	39.939383, -74.257272	3432424	2389943
Hope	Warren	Hope	256	195	x	x	x		102	0.615	0.614	0.001	40.912139, -74.95879	3433030	2584002
Hopelawn	Middlesex	Woodbridge	2,603	x	x	x	x								
Hutchinson	Warren	Harmony	103	135	x	x	x		65	0.198	0.138	0.06	40.781648, -75.124455	3433690	2584003
Iselin	Middlesex	Woodbridge	20,088	18,695	16,698	16,141	x		6,718	3.19	3.189	0.001	40.569294, -74.321106	3434470	2389973
Jobstown	Burlington	Springfield	369	x	x	x	x								
Johnsonburg	Warren	Frelinghuysen	381	101	x	x	x		45	0.196	0.196	0	40.965072, -74.878177	3436150	2584004
Juliustown	Burlington	Springfield	362	429	x	x	x		150	1.284	1.284	0	40.01181, -74.67116	3436300	2633184
Kean University	Union	Hillside / Union	1,522	x	x	x	x								
Keasbey	Middlesex	Woodbridge	3,027	x	x	x	x								
Kendall Park	Middlesex	South Brunswick	9,989	9,339	9,006	7,127	7,419	Listed as and unincorporated community in the 1970 U.S. census (pop. 7,412).	3,198	3.704	3.702	0.002	40.413404, -74.562457	3436660	2389993
Kenvil	Morris	Roxbury	1,806	3,009	x	x	x		1,149	1.581	1.33	0.251	40.870198, -74.631639	3436720	2584005
Kingston	Middlesex / Somerset	South Brunswick / Franklin	1,581	1,493	1,292	1,047	x		692	2.326	2.238	0.088	40.387103, -74.6152	3436930	2584006
Kingston Estates	Camden	Cherry Hill	6,322	5,685	x	x	x		2,553	1.164	1.162	0.002	39.918085, -74.990185	3436960	2584007
Lake Hiawatha	Morris	Parsippany-Troy Hills	10,194	x	x	x	x	Listed as and unincorporated community in the 1970 U.S. census (pop. 11,389).							
Lake Hopatcong	Morris	Jefferson	10,232	x	x	x	x	Listed as an unincorporated community under the name Esponong in the 1960 U.S. census (pop. 1,107) and the 1970 U.S. census (pop. 1,941).							
Lake Mohawk	Sussex	Byram / Sparta	9,759	9,916	9,755	8,930	8,498	Listed as an unincorporated place in the 1950 U.S. census (pop. 1,873), 1960 U.S. census (pop. 4,647), and 1970 U.S. census (pop. 6,262).	4,100	6.172	5.005	1.167	41.012138, -74.672558	3438040	2390020
Lake Telemark	Morris	Rockaway	1,172	1,255	1,202	1,121	1,216	Listed as and unincorporated community in the 1970 U.S. census (pop. 1,086).	464	2.257	2.2	0.057	40.960346, -74.497426	3438430	2390026
Lakeside-Beebe Run	Cumberland	Hopewell	403	x	x	x	x								
Lakewood	Ocean	Lakewood	69,398	53,805	36,065	26,095	22,863	Listed as an unincorporated place in the 1950 U.S. census (pop. 9,970), 1960 U.S. census (pop. 13,004), and 1970 U.S. census (pop. 17,874).	11,226	7.323	7.078	0.245	40.093975, -74.211478	3438580	2390031
Lamington	Somerset	Bedminster	135	x	x	x	x								
Landing	Morris	Roxbury	4,296	x	x	x	x								
Laurel Heights	Cumberland	Upper Deerfield	380	x	x	x	x								
Laurel Lake	Cumberland	Commercial	2,861	2,989	2,929	x	x		1,230	1.863	1.74	0.123	39.326293, -75.03062	3439120	2390038
Laurence Harbor	Middlesex	Old Bridge	6,635	6,536	6,227	6,361	6,737	Listed as an unincorporated place in the 1970 U.S. census (pop. 6,715)	2,650	2.953	2.897	0.056	40.447787, -74.248358	3439360	2390040
Lawrenceville	Mercer	Lawrence	3,751	3,887	4,081	6,446	x	Listed as and unincorporated community in the 1950 U.S. census (pop. 1,056).	1,805	1.043	1.042	0.001	40.302787, -74.738004	3439570	2390044
Layton	Sussex	Sandyston	692	x	x	x	x								
Ledgewood	Morris	Roxbury	4,903	x	x	x	x								
Leeds Point	Atlantic	Galloway	205	x	x	x	x								
Leesburg	Cumberland	Maurice River	601	x	x	x	x								
Leisure Knoll	Ocean	Manchester	2,562	2,490	2,467	2,707	x		1,627	0.895	0.888	0.007	40.018055, -74.28963	3439883	2390050
Leisure Village	Ocean	Lakewood	4,966	4,400	4,443	4,295	x		3,080	1.394	1.31	0.084	40.043765, -74.186217	3439900	2390051
Leisure Village East	Ocean	Lakewood	4,189	4,217	4,597	1,989	x		3,057	1.497	1.487	0.01	40.037777, -74.168192	3439910	2390052
Leisure Village West	Ocean	Manchester	3,692	3,493	x	x	x		2,665	1.222	1.21	0.012	40.010227, -74.281723	3439920	2390053
Leisuretowne	Burlington	Southampton	3,842	3,582	2,535	2,552	2,375		2,351	2.043	1.915	0.128	39.89342, -74.708177	3439885	2390054
Leonardo	Monmouth	Middletown	2,549	2,757	2,823	3,788	x	Listed as an unincorporated community in the 1950 U.S. census (pop. 1,887)	1,055	0.603	0.595	0.008	40.419287, -74.060197	3439990	2390059
Liberty Corner	Somerset	Bernards	1,877	x	x	x	x								
Lincroft	Monmouth	Middletown	7,060	6,135	6,255	6,193	x		2,159	5.799	5.58	0.219	40.335293, -74.132838	3440320	2390072
Llewellyn Park	Essex	West Orange	821	x	x	x	x								
Long Valley	Morris	Washington	1,827	1,879	1,818	1,744	1,682	Listed as an unincorporated place in the 1960 U.S. census (pop. 1,220) and the 1970 U.S. census (pop. 1,645).	709	4.623	4.566	0.057	40.78225, -74.776936	3441400	2390090
Lopatcong Overlook	Warren	Lopatcong	692	734	x	x	x		390	0.345	0.345	0	40.697399, -75.145302	3441495	2584008
Lower Berkshire Valley	Morris	Jefferson / Roxbury	617	x	x	x	x								
Lyons	Somerset	Bernards	5,345	x	x	x	x								
Macopin	Passaic	West Milford	2,199	x	x	x	x								
Madison Park	Middlesex	Old Bridge	8,050	7,144	6,929	7,490	7,447		2,734	1.687	1.659	0.028	40.445716, -74.296163	3442540	2390107
Malaga	Gloucester	Franklin	1,475	x	x	x	x								
Manahawkin	Ocean	Stafford	2,413	2,303	2,004	1,594	1,469	Listed as and unincorporated community in the 1970 U.S. census (pop. 1,278).	1,071	1.923	1.827	0.096	39.693472, -74.250229	3442930	2390114
Marksboro	Warren	Frelinghuysen	186	82	x	x	x		36	0.324	0.32	0.004	40.986418, -74.904367	3443980	2584009
Marlboro	Cumberland	Stow Creek	127	x	x	x	x								
Marlton	Burlington	Evesham	10,594	10,133	10,260	10,228	9,411	Listed as and unincorporated community in the 1970 U.S. census (pop. 10,180).	4,343	3.235	3.227	0.008	39.901885, -74.929277	3444100	2390126
Marmora	Cape May	Upper	2,413	x	x	x	x								
Marshallville	Cape May	Upper	376	x	x	x	x								
Martinsville	Somerset	Bridgewater	12,147	11,980	x	x	x		4,461	12.398	12.322	0.076	40.602946, -74.575794	3444430	2584010
Mauricetown	Cumberland	Commercial	403	x	x	x	x								
Mays Landing	Atlantic	Hamilton	5,603	2,135	2,321	2,090	2,054	Listed as an unincorporated place in the 1950 U.S. census (pop. 1,301), 1960 U.S. census (pop. 1,404), and 1970 U.S. census (pop. 1,272).	949	1.885	1.66	0.225	39.452862, -74.723936	3444820	2390140
McGuire AFB	Burlington	New Hanover / North Hanover	4,522	3,710	6,478	7,580	7,853	Listed as an unincorporated place in the 1970 U.S. census (pop. 10,933).	1,535	5.364	5.359	0.005	40.027987, -74.587795	3442390	2389460
McKee City	Atlantic	Hamilton	9,758	x	x	x	x								
Menlo Park Terrace	Middlesex	Woodbridge	2,806	x	x	x	x								
Mercerville	Mercer	Hamilton	13,447	13,230	x	x	x		5,246	3.73	3.687	0.043	40.235832, -74.692254	3445480	2389472
Mickleton	Gloucester	East Greenwich	2,285	x	x	x	x								
Middlebush	Somerset	Franklin	2,368	2,326	x	x	x		868	1.99	1.989	0.001	40.505696, -74.53337	3445870	2584011
Millington	Morris	Long Hill	3,038	x	x	x	x	Listed as an unincorporated place in the 1960 U.S. census (pop. 1,182).							
Milmay	Atlantic / Cumberland	Buena Vista / Maurice River	919	x	x	x	x								
Mizpah	Atlantic	Hamilton	479	x	x	x	x								
Money Island	Cumberland	Downe	22	x	x	x	x								
Monmouth Junction	Middlesex	South Brunswick	8,895	2,887	2,721	1,570	2,579		919	1.483	1.468	0.015	40.380344, -74.543237	3447190	2389493
Monroe Manor	Middlesex	Monroe	2,178	x	x	x	x								
Montclair State University	Passaic / Essex	Little Falls / Montclair	2,180	x	x	x	x								
Moorestown-Lenola	Burlington	Moorestown	14,240	14,217	13,860	13,242	13,695	Listed as and unincorporated community in the 1970 U.S. census (pop. 14,179).	5,595	7.118	7.01	0.108	39.966524, -74.962526	3447895	2389504
Morganville	Monmouth	Marlboro	6,203	5,040	x	x	x		1,583	5.429	5.423	0.006	40.375327, -74.23281	3448030	2389505
Mount Hermon	Warren	Hope	172	141	x	x	x		54	0.474	0.462	0.012	40.927747, -74.99027	3448840	2584013
Mount Hope	Morris	Rockaway	2,930	x	x	x	x								
Mount Royal	Gloucester	East Greenwich	777	x	x	x	x								
Mount Tabor	Morris	Denville / Parsippany-Troy Hills	1,244	x	x	x	x								
Mountain Lake	Warren	Liberty	494	575	x	x	x		315	1.305	1.13	0.175	40.859118, -74.98824	3448450	2584012
Mullica Hill	Gloucester	Harrison	4,698	3,982	1,658	1,117	1,050		1,502	3.626	3.603	0.023	39.725999, -75.21882	3449440	2389522
Mystic Island	Ocean	Little Egg Harbor	8,301	8,493	8,694	7,400	4,929		5,185	7.701	6.925	0.776	39.565839, -74.380959	3449560	2389525
Navesink	Monmouth	Middletown	2,004	2,020	1,962	x	x	Listed as and unincorporated community in the 1950 U.S. census (pop. 1,085).	732	0.896	0.885	0.011	40.401105, -74.040464	3449740	2389532
Nesco	Atlantic	Mullica	422	x	x	x	x								
Neshanic	Somerset	Hillsborough	854	x	x	x	x								
Neshanic Station	Hunterdon / Somerset	Branchburg / Readington	5,224	x	x	x	x								
New Egypt	Ocean	Plumsted	2,460	2,512	2,519	2,327	2,111	Listed as an unincorporated place in the 1950 U.S. census (pop. 1,294), 1960 U.S. census (pop. 1,737), and 1970 U.S. census (pop. 1,769).	972	4.071	4.015	0.056	40.065119, -74.527039	3451360	2389541
New Gretna	Burlington	Bass River	390	x	x	x	x								
New Village	Warren	Franklin	399	421	x	x	x		180	0.949	0.949	0	40.718409, -75.077244	3452050	2584014
Newfoundland	Morris / Passaic	Jefferson / West Milford	1,145	x	x	x	x								
Newport	Cumberland	Downe	487	x	x	x	x								
Newtonville	Atlantic	Buena Vista	742	x	x	x	x								
New Vernon	Morris	Harding	825	x	x	x	x								
North Beach Haven	Ocean	Long Beach	2,198	2,235	2,427	2,413	2,652		6,214	1.831	1.815	0.016	39.600412, -74.211614	3452410	2389563
North Cape May	Cape May	Lower	4,007	3,226	3,618	3,226	4,089	Listed as and unincorporated community in the 1970 U.S. census (pop. 3,812).	2,100	1.494	1.457	0.037	38.976427, -74.951503	3452650	2389569
North Middletown	Monmouth	Middletown	3,146	3,295	3,165	3,160	x		1,203	0.434	0.434	0	40.438991, -74.118523	3453205	2389577
Oak Ridge	Morris / Passaic	Jefferson / West Milford	10,996	x	x	x	x								
Oak Valley	Gloucester	Deptford	3,497	3,483	3,747	4,055	x		1,315	0.711	0.707	0.004	39.806271, -75.158815	3454060	2389602
Oakhurst	Monmouth	Ocean	4,069	3,995	4,152	4,130	x	Listed as an unincorporated place in the 1950 U.S. census (pop. 2,388), 1960 U.S. census (pop. 4,374), and 1970 U.S. census (pop. 5,558).	1,473	1.614	1.611	0.003	40.261486, -74.02655	3453790	2389604
Ocean Acres	Ocean	Barnegat / Stafford	18,185	16,142	13,155	5,587	4,850		5,923	5.956	5.848	0.108	39.741788, -74.280983	3454315	2389608
Ocean Grove	Monmouth	Neptune	2,549	3,342	4,256	4,818	x	Listed as and unincorporated community in the 1950 U.S. census (pop. 3,806).	3,132	0.428	0.372	0.056	40.21182, -74.006944	3454480	2389609
Ocean View	Cape May	Dennis	685	x	x	x	x								
Oceanville	Atlantic	Galloway	793	x	x	x	x								
Old Bridge	Middlesex	Old Bridge	27,210	23,753	22,833	22,151	21,815	Listed as and unincorporated community in the 1970 U.S. census (pop. 22,240).	7,987	7.274	7.1	0.174	40.396577, -74.334317	3454690	2389616
Oldwick	Hunterdon	Tewksbury	445	x	x	x	x								
Olivet	Salem	Pittsgrove	1,297	1,408	1,420	1,315	x		490	2.701	2.504	0.197	39.538101, -75.176334	3454960	2389619
Othello	Cumberland	Greenwich	132	x	x	x	x								
Oxford	Warren	Oxford	1,033	1,090	2,283	1,767	1,587	Listed as an unincorporated community in the 1950 U.S. census (pop. 1,041). It was not listed in the 1960 U.S. census. It was again listed as an unincorporated community under the name Oxford Center in the 1970 U.S. census (pop. 1,411). It was then listed as a census designated place in the 1980 U.S. census.	514	0.694	0.689	0.005	40.806004, -75.001467	3455500	2389632
Packanack Lake	Passaic	Wayne	6,261	x	x	x	x								
Palermo	Cape May	Upper	3,183	x	x	x	x								
Panther Valley	Warren	Allamuchy	4,391	3,327	x	x	x		1,710	2.978	2.964	0.014	40.911287, -74.840643	3455895	2584015
Parsippany	Morris	Parsippany-Troy Hills	22,778	x	x	x	x								
Pedricktown	Salem	Oldmans	487	524	x	x	x		220	0.905	0.903	0.002	39.76643, -75.407591	3457360	2584016
Pemberton Heights	Burlington	Pemberton	2,485	2,423	2,512	2,941	3,150		1,116	0.937	0.937	0	39.95792, -74.674924	3457540	2389655
Pennsville	Salem	Pennsville	12,043	11,888	11,657	12,218	12,467	Listed as an unincorporated place in the 1970 U.S. census (pop. 11,014).	5,209	10.422	10.065	0.357	39.652074, -75.509256	3457840	2389661
Pine Brook	Morris	Montville	5,675	x	x	x	x								
Pine Lake Park	Ocean	Manchester	8,913	8,707	x	x	x		3,017	2.57	2.57	0	40.001605, -74.258977	3458830	2584017
Pine Ridge at Crestwood	Ocean	Manchester	2,537	2,369	2,025	2,372	x		1,810	1.736	1.728	0.008	39.961557, -74.312016	3458852	2389676
Pines Lake	Passaic	Wayne	3,033	x	x	x	x								
Plainsboro Center	Middlesex	Plainsboro	2,760	2,712	2,209	x	x		1,311	0.762	0.759	0.003	40.332213, -74.589986	3459285	2389680
Pleasant Plains	Somerset	Franklin	792	922	x	x	x		257	3.221	3.215	0.006	40.45312, -74.576459	3459500	2584018
Pleasantdale	Essex	West Orange	2,329	x	x	x	x								
Pluckemin	Somerset	Bedminster	359	x	x	x	x								
Pomona	Atlantic	Galloway	7,416	7,124	4,019	2,624	2,358		2,202	2.797	2.797	0	39.468722, -74.550112	3460030	2389693
Pompton Plains	Morris	Pequannock	11,144	x	x	x	x								
Port Colden	Warren	Washington	260	122	x	x	x		59	0.197	0.197	0	40.768259, -74.954121	3460210	2584019
Port Elizabeth	Cumberland	Maurice River	290	x	x	x	x								
Port Monmouth	Monmouth	Middletown	3,745	3,818	3,742	3,558	x	Listed as and unincorporated community in the 1950 U.S. census (pop. 1,767).	1,441	1.343	1.302	0.041	40.436673, -74.098641	3460360	2389696
Port Morris	Morris	Roxbury	754	x	x	x	x								
Port Murray	Warren	Mansfield	227	129	x	x	x		63	0.168	0.167	0.001	40.793505, -74.913547	3460450	2584020
Port Norris	Cumberland	Commercial	1,111	1,377	1,507	1,701	1,730	Listed as an unincorporated place in the 1950 U.S. census (pop. 1,735), 1960 U.S. census (pop. 1,789), and 1970 U.S. census (pop. 1,955).	552	6.829	6.335	0.494	39.250469, -75.042457	3460510	2389697
Port Reading	Middlesex	Woodbridge	3,921	3,728	3,829	3,977	x		1,342	2.898	2.243	0.655	40.561643, -74.244018	3460540	2389698
Pottersville	Somerset / Hunterdon	Bedminster / Tewksbury	467	x	x	x	x								
Preakness	Passaic	Wayne	18,487	x	x	x	x								
Presidential Lakes Estates	Burlington	Pemberton	2,353	2,365	2,332	2,450	2,607		819	1.084	1.063	0.021	39.914955, -74.563509	3460840	2389705
Princeton Junction	Mercer	West Windsor	2,475	2,465	2,382	2,362	2,419		940	1.853	1.826	0.027	40.323294, -74.621157	3460960	2389708
Princeton Meadows	Middlesex	Plainsboro	14,776	13,834	13,436	x	x		6,290	2.115	2.077	0.038	40.333922, -74.566133	3460975	2389709
Quinton	Salem	Quinton	470	588	x	x	x		225	0.908	0.885	0.023	39.547478, -75.410915	3461440	2584021
Rainbow Lakes	Morris	Parsippany-Troy Hills	1,255	x	x	x	x								
Ramapo College of New Jersey	Bergen	Mahwah	2,200	x	x	x	x								
Ramblewood	Burlington	Mount Laurel	6,655	5,907	6,003	6,181	6,475	Listed as an unincorporated place 1970 U.S. census (pop. 5,558).	2,388	3.386	3.372	0.014	39.932053, -74.952749	3461650	2389722
Ramtown	Monmouth	Howell	6,329	6,242	5,932	x	x		1,963	2.203	2.192	0.011	40.114713, -74.150158	3461725	2389724
Regency at Monroe	Middlesex	Monroe	2,036	x	x	x	x								
Renaissance at Monroe	Middlesex	Monroe	637	x	x	x	x								
Richland	Atlantic	Buena Vista	623	x	x	x	x								
Richwood	Gloucester	Harrison / Mantua	3,577	3,459	x	x	x		1,101	8.91	8.85	0.06	39.715978, -75.172472	3462820	2584022
Ringoes	Hunterdon	East Amwell	849	x	x	x	x								
Rio Grande	Cape May	Lower / Middle	3,610	2,670	2,444	2,505	2,016	Listed as an unincorporated place 1970 U.S. census (pop. 1,203).	1,489	2.49	2.459	0.031	39.019051, -74.87787	3463180	2389752
Roadstown	Cumberland	Hopewell / Stow Creek	155	x	x	x	x								
Robbinsville Center	Mercer	Robbinsville	3,164	3,041	x	x	x		1,325	0.759	0.757	0.002	40.219971, -74.630225	3463840	2612511
Robertsville	Monmouth	Marlboro	11,399	11,297	x	x	x		3,941	5.932	5.919	0.013	40.338759, -74.294388	3463900	2634200
Roebling	Burlington	Florence	3,585	3,715	x	x	x		1,481	1.173	1.008	0.165	40.117217, -74.777844	3464350	2584023
Rosenhayn	Cumberland	Deerfield	1,150	1,098	1,099	1,053	x		404	2.654	2.654	0	39.47868, -75.13791	3464740	2389778
Ross Corner	Sussex	Frankford	120	13	x	x	x		7	0.495	0.492	0.003	41.127527, -74.713356	3464860	2584024
Rossmoor	Middlesex	Monroe	2,992	2,666	3,129	3,231	x		2,257	0.918	0.904	0.014	40.332747, -74.472422	3464865	2389783
Rutgers University-Busch Campus	Middlesex	Piscataway	4,586	x	x	x	x								
Rutgers University-Livingston Campus	Middlesex	Piscataway / Edison / Highland Park	3,545	x	x	x	x								
Seabrook Farms	Cumberland	Upper Deerfield	1,508	1,484	1,719	1,457	1,411	Listed as an unincorporated place in the 1950 U.S. census (pop. 2,284), 1960 U.S. census (pop. 1,798), and 1970 U.S. census (pop. 1,569).	548	2.177	2.167	0.01	39.501155, -75.220355	3466300	2390267
Seaville	Cape May	Upper	695	x	x	x	x								
Seeley	Cumberland	Upper Deerfield	152	x	x	x	x								
Sewaren	Middlesex	Woodbridge	2,885	2,756	2,780	2,569	x		1,043	1.004	0.954	0.05	40.550726, -74.259885	3466720	2390280
Sewell	Gloucester	Mantua / Washington	3,346	x	x	x	x								
Shark River Hills	Monmouth	Neptune	3,583	3,697	3,878	4,228	x		1,577	0.981	0.891	0.09	40.193066, -74.044461	3466840	2390285
Sheppards Mill	Cumberland	Greenwich / Hopewell	131	x	x	x	x								
Short Hills	Essex	Millburn	14,422	13,165	x	x	x		4,292	5.211	5.196	0.015	40.739157, -74.327442	3467320	2584025
Sicklerville	Camden	Winslow	45,084	x	x	x	x								
Silver Lake	Cumberland	Upper Deerfield	1,435	x	x	x	x								
Silver Lake	Essex	Belleville / Bloomfield	4,243	4,243	x	x	x		1,733	0.326	0.326	0	40.780434, -74.182817	3467590	2628225
Silver Lake	Warren	Hope	368	368	x	x	x		155	0.995	0.993	0.002	40.932374, -74.945098	3467650	2584026
Silver Ridge	Ocean	Berkeley	1,167	1,133	1,211	1,138	x		827	0.469	0.465	0.004	39.961716, -74.235938	3467665	2390300
Singac	Passaic	Little Falls	3,602	3,618	x	x	x		1,545	0.498	0.466	0.032	40.884254, -74.243539	3467770	2584027
Six Mile Run	Somerset	Franklin	3,383	3,184	x	x	x		1,218	7.484	7.476	0.008	40.469914, -74.532222	3467820	2584028
Skillman	Somerset	Montgomery	237	242	x	x	x		99	1.476	1.466	0.01	40.428191, -74.712293	3467860	2584029
Smithville	Atlantic	Galloway	7,242	7,242	x	x	x		3,548	5.055	5.001	0.054	39.494939, -74.478633	3468190	2584030
Somerset	Somerset	Franklin	22,968	22,083	22,083	22,070	21,731		8,883	6.444	6.327	0.117	40.508507, -74.500207	3468370	2390312
South Dennis	Cape May	Dennis	1,703	x	x	x	x								
South Seaville	Cape May	Dennis	695	x	x	x	x								
Springdale	Camden	Cherry Hill	14,811	14,518	14,409	x	x		5,434	5.353	5.349	0.004	39.876188, -74.972145	3469900	2390337
Springfield	Union	Springfield	1,518	x	x	x	x								
Stewartsville	Warren	Greenwich	636	349	x	x	x		144	0.129	0.129	0	40.693943, -75.111442	3470800	2584031
Stirling	Morris	Long Hill	2,555	x	x	x	x	Listed as an unincorporated community in the 1950 U.S. census (pop. 1,076). and the 1960 U.S. census (pop. 1,382). It did not appear again until it was again named a CDP in the 2020 U.S. census.							
Stockton University	Atlantic	Galloway	2,428	x	x	x	x								
Stonebridge	Middlesex	Monroe	1,616	x	x	x	x								
Strathmere	Cape May	Upper	137	158	175	x	x		447	0.76	0.598	0.162	39.19614, -74.659412	3471250	2390365
Strathmore	Monmouth	Aberdeen	7,225	7,258	6,740	7,060	x	Listed as an unincorporated community in the 1970 U.S. census (pop. 7,674). Not listed in the 1980 U.S. census	2,607	2.021	1.971	0.05	40.401587, -74.219349	3471280	2390366
Succasunna	Morris	Roxbury	10,338	9,152	x	x	x		3,163	5.187	5.128	0.059	40.851023, -74.658201	3471370	2584032
Sunset Lake	Cumberland	Upper Deerfield	494	x	x	x	x								
Sweetwater	Atlantic	Mullica	805	x	x	x	x								
Ten Mile Run	Somerset	Franklin	2,055	1,959	x	x	x		622	2.539	2.538	0.001	40.424136, -74.586348	3472435	2584033
The College of New Jersey	Mercer	Ewing	3,701	x	x	x	x								
The Hills	Somerset	Bedminster / Bernards	11,410	x	x	x	x								
The Ponds	Middlesex	Monroe	941	x	x	x	x								
Thorofare	Gloucester	West Deptford	2,806	x	x	x	x								
Three Bridges	Hunterdon	Readington	321	x	x	x	x								
Titusville	Mercer	Hopewell	633	x	x	x	x								
Toms River	Ocean	Toms River	92,830	88,791	7,524	7,303	7,465	Listed as an unincorporated place in the 1950 U.S. census (pop. 2,517), 1960 U.S. census (pop. 6,062), and 1970 U.S. census (pop. 7,303).	36,605	40.738	38.947	1.791	39.994856, -74.187754	3473110	2390394
Towaco	Morris	Montville	5,624	x	x	x	x								
Troy Hills	Morris	Parsippany-Troy Hills	5,081	x	x	x	x								
Tuckahoe	Cape May	Upper	357	x	x	x	x								
Turnersville	Gloucester	Washington	3,594	3,742	3,867	3,843	x		1,237	1.495	1.487	0.008	39.766445, -75.062003	3474270	2390410
Twin Rivers	Mercer	East Windsor	7,787	7,443	7,422	7,715	7,742		2,808	1.319	1.28	0.039	40.263194, -74.487843	3474330	2390412
Union	Union	Union	2,229	x	x	x	x								
Upper Greenwood Lake	Passaic / Sussex	Vernon / West Milford	3,687	x	x	x	2,734	Listed as an unincorporated community in the 1970 U.S. census (pop. 1,505); Became part of West Milford CDP prior to the 1990 U.S. census							
Upper Montclair	Essex	Montclair	13,146	11,565	x	x	x		4,310	2.536	2.535	0.001	40.842576, -74.201302	3475020	2584034
Upper Pohatcong	Warren	Pohatcong	1,714	1,781	x	x	x		732	0.656	0.656	0	40.677469, -75.155801	3475120	2584035
Upper Stewartsville	Warren	Greenwich	329	212	x	x	x		84	0.07	0.07	0	40.702784, -75.119379	3475145	2584036
Vauxhall	Union	Union	5,251	x	x	x	x								
Vernon Center	Sussex	Vernon	1,743	1,713	x	x	x		1,228	2.957	2.939	0.018	41.188789, -74.504046	3475745	2584037
Vernon Valley	Sussex	Vernon	1,491	1,626	1,737	1,696	1,169		577	2.705	2.677	0.028	41.242167, -74.486047	3475750	2390429
Victory Lakes	Gloucester	Monroe	1,999	2,111	2,118	2,160	x		779	2.521	2.402	0.119	39.630558, -74.969218	3475920	2390433
Vienna	Warren	Independence	881	981	x	x	x		337	2.933	2.922	0.011	40.872247, -74.872519	3475950	2584038
Villas	Cape May	Lower	9,134	9,483	9,064	8,136	5,909	Listed as an unincorporated community in the 1960 U.S. census (pop. 3,155) and the 1970 U.S. census (pop. 2,085)	5,849	3.909	3.883	0.026	39.016266, -74.935969	3476010	2390438
Vincentown	Burlington	Southampton	535	x	x	x	x								
Vista Center	Ocean	Jackson	2,370	2,095	541	x	x		948	3.427	3.388	0.039	40.158303, -74.324246	3476107	2390441
Voorhees	Somerset	Franklin	1,517	976	x	x	x		317	0.718	0.718	0	40.482176, -74.492506	3476250	2584039
Wanamassa	Monmouth	Ocean	4,344	4,532	4,551	4,530	x	Listed as an unincorporated place in the 1950 U.S. census (pop. 2,512) and the 1960 U.S. census (pop. 3,928)	1,709	1.152	1.114	0.038	40.236816, -74.028865	3476700	2390450
Waretown	Ocean	Ocean	1,483	1,569	1,582	1,283	1,175		836	0.925	0.899	0.026	39.789812, -74.193275	3476820	2390452
Washington Crossing	Mercer	Hopewell	371	x	x	x	x								
Watsessing	Essex	Bloomfield	8,078	x	x	x	x								
West Belmar	Monmouth	Wall	2,459	2,493	2,606	2,498	x	Listed as an unincorporated community in the 1950 U.S. census (pop. 2,058) and the 1960 U.S. census (pop. 2,511).	1,092	0.47	0.47	0	40.170665, -74.037579	3478350	2390466
West Berlin	Camden	Berlin	2,686	x	x	x	x								
West Freehold	Monmouth	Freehold	13,596	13,613	12,498	11,166	9,929		5,108	5.927	5.913	0.014	40.230905, -74.294073	3479100	2390471
Westmont	Camden	Haddon	13,726	x	x	x	x								
Weston	Somerset	Franklin	2,023	1,235	x	x	x		703	1.447	1.395	0.052	40.527045, -74.56718	3479715	2584040
West Park	Cumberland	Hopewell	1,506	x	x	x	x								
Whippany	Morris	Hanover	8,863	x	x	x	x								
White Horse	Mercer	Hamilton	9,791	9,494	9,373	9,397	10,098	Part of the unincorporated community of White Horse-Yardville in the 1970 U.S. census (pop. 18,680)	4,018	3.138	3.074	0.064	40.191823, -74.701372	3480630	2390504
Whitehouse Station	Hunterdon	Readington	3,152	2,089	1,951	1,287	x	Listed as an unincorporated community in the 1970 U.S. census; not isted in the 1980 U.S. census.	989	1.346	1.303	0.043	40.616169, -74.771893	3480720	2390505
White Meadow Lake	Morris	Rockaway	8,710	8,836	9,052	8,002	8,429	Listed as and unincorporated community in the 1970 U.S. census (8,499).	3,152	4.318	3.847	0.471	40.928477, -74.516762	3480750	2390507
Whitesboro	Cape May	Middle	2,300	2,205	x	x	x		1,072	3.632	3.614	0.018	39.042252, -74.868134	3480855	2390509
Whittingham	Middlesex	Monroe	2,348	2,476	2,783	x	x		1,564	1.003	0.997	0.006	40.330542, -74.445603	3481042	2390511
Williamstown	Gloucester	Monroe	15,082	15,567	11,812	10,891	5,768	Listed as and unincorporated community in the 1950 U.S. census (pop. 2,632); the 1960 U.S. census (pop. 2,722); and the 1970 U.S. census (4,075).	5,857	7.423	7.419	0.004	39.684113, -74.968819	3481380	2390518
William Paterson University of New Jersey	Passaic	Wayne	1,417	x	x	x	x								
Windsor	Mercer	Robbinsville	330	x	x	x	x								
Woodbridge	Middlesex	Woodbridge	19,839	19,265	18,309	17,434	x		7,728	3.861	3.846	0.015	40.554981, -74.285014	3481950	2390527
Yardville	Mercer	Hamilton	6,965	7,186	x	x	x		2,841	4.074	4.051	0.023	40.186645, -74.66308	3483170	2633183
Yorketown	Monmouth	Manalapan	6,617	6,535	6,712	6,313	5,330		2,014	2.397	2.388	0.009	40.305904, -74.338899	3483245	2390550
Zarephath	Somerset	Franklin	69	37	x	x	x		20	0.445	0.404	0.041	40.534573, -74.572191	3483290	2584041

== Former census-designated places ==
Former census-designated places in New Jersey
CDP name	County	Parent Township	Population (2020)	Population (2010)	Population (2000)	Population (1990)	Population (1980)	Notes
Aberdeen Township	Monmouth	Aberdeen	x	x	x	x	17,235	deleted; part used to form Cliffwood Beach CDP and Strathmore CDP
Allamuchy-Panther Valley	Warren	Allamuchy	x	x	3,125	2,764	x	split to Allamuchy and Panther Valley
Barclay-Kingston	Camden	Cherry Hill	x	x	10,728	x	x	split to Barclay and Kingston Estates
Belleville	Essex	Belleville	x	x	35,928	34,213	x	Deleted prior to the 2010 U.S. census as it was coextensive with a township of the same name
Berkeley Heights	Union	Berkeley Heights	x	x	13,407	11,980	12,549	Deleted prior to the 2010 U.S. census as it was coextensive with a township of the same name
Bloomfield	Essex	Bloomfield	x	x	47,683	45,061	x	Deleted prior to the 2010 U.S. census as it was coextensive with a township of the same name
Brick Township	Ocean	Brick	x	x	x	66,473	53,629	
Erlton-Ellisburg	Camden	Cherry Hill	x	x	8,168	x	x	part taken to create Ellisburg
Candlewood	Monmouth	Howell	x	x	x	x	6,750	Listed as an unincorporated community in the 1970 U.S. census (pop. 5,629); deleted prior to the 1990 U.S. census
Cedar Grove	Essex	Cedar Grove	x	x	12,300	12,053	12,600	Deleted prior to the 2010 U.S. census as it was coextensive with a township of the same name
Cherry Hill	Camden	Cherry Hill	x	x	x	69,319	68,785	Deleted; split to form Ashland, Barclay-Kingston, Cherry Hill Mall, Erlton-Ellisburg, Golden Triangle, Greentree, and Springdale CDP
Cinnaminson	Burlington	Cinnaminson	x	x	x	14,583	16,072	Deleted prior to the 2000 U.S. census as it was coextensive with a township of the same name
Clark	Union	Clark	x	x	14,597	14,629	16,699	Deleted prior to the 2010 U.S. census as it was coextensive with a township of the same name
Clover Hill	Monmouth	Colts Neck	x	x	x	x	2,056	
Cranford	Union	Cranford	x	x	22,578	22,624	24,573	Deleted prior to the 2010 U.S. census as it was coextensive with a township of the same name
Culvers Lake	Sussex	Frankford	x	x	x	x	1,062	
Cranbury	Middlesex	Cranbury	x	x	x	x	1,255	Listed as an unincorporated community in the 1970 U.S. census (pop. 1.253) and the 1960 U.S. census (pop. 1,038)
Delanco	Burlington	Delanco	x	x	x	3,316	3,730	
East Hanover	Morris	East Hanover	x	x	x	9,926	9,319	
Edgewater Park	Burlington	Edgewater Park	x	x	x	8,388	9,273	x
Ewing	Mercer		x	x	35,707	34,185	34,842	Deleted prior to the 2010 U.S. census as it was coextensive with a township of the same name
East Brunswick	Middlesex		x	x	46,756	43,548	37,711	Deleted prior to the 2010 U.S. census as it was coextensive with a township of the same name
Edison	Middlesex	Edison	x	x	97,687	88,680	70,193	Deleted prior to the 2010 U.S. census as it was coextensive with a township of the same name
Fairfield	Essex	Fairfield	x	x	7,063	7,583	7,987	Deleted prior to the 2010 U.S. census as it was coextensive with a township of the same name
Florence-Roebling	Burlington	Florence	x	x	8,200	8,564	7,677	First appeared as an unincorporated community in the 1950 U.S. census (pop. 6,785); Split into the separate communities of Florence and Roebling in the 1960 U.S. census (combined pop. 7,487); and recombined for the 1970 U.S. census (pop. 7,551). Split to Florence and Roebling prior to the 2010 U.S. census.
Gilford Park	Ocean		x	x	x	8,668	6,528	First appeared as an unincorporated community in the 1960 U.S. census (pop. 1,560) and the 1970 U.S. census (pop. 4,007); Deleted and merged into Toms River CDP prior to the 2000 U.S. census
Gordon's Corner	Monmouth	Manalapan	x	x	x	x	6,320	
Great Meadows-Vienna	Warren	Independence	x	x	1,264	1,108	x	split to Great Meadows and Vienna
Hanover Township	Morris	Hanover	x	x	x	11,538	11,846	
Hazlet	Monmouth		x	x	x	x	23,013	
Hillside	Union	Hillside	x	x	21,747	21,044	21,440	Deleted prior to the 2010 U.S. census as it was coextensive with a township of the same name
Irvington	Essex	Irvington	x	x	60,695	61,018	x	Deleted prior to the 2010 U.S. census as it was coextensive with a township of the same name
Leisure Village West-Pine Lake Park	Ocean	Manchester	x	x	11,085	10,139	x	split to Leisure Village West and Pine Lake Park
Livingston	Essex	Livingston	x	x	27,391	26,609	28,040	Deleted prior to the 2010 U.S. census as it was coextensive with a township of the same name
Little Falls	Passaic		x	x	10,855	11,294	11,496	Deleted prior to the 2010 U.S. census as it was coextensive with a township of the same name
Lyndhurst	Bergen	Lyndhurst	x	x	18,262	20,326	20,729	Deleted prior to the 2010 U.S. census as it was coextensive with a township of the same name
Maplewood	Essex	Maplewood	x	x	22,950	21,652	23,868	Deleted prior to the 2010 U.S. census as it was coextensive with a township of the same name
Maple Shade	Burlington	Maple Shade	x	x	x	19,211	20,525	
Mercerville-Hamilton Square	Mercer	Hamilton	x	x	26,419	26,873	25,446	Listed as an unincorporated community in the 1970 U.S. census (pop. 24.465); split to Hamilton Square and Mercerville
Middletown	Monmouth	Middletown	x	x	x	x	61,615	part used to form Fairview, Leonardo, Lincroft, North Middletown, and Port Monmouth CDPs
Millburn	Essex	Millburn	x	x	19,765	18,630	19,543	Deleted prior to the 2010 U.S. census as it was coextensive with a township of the same name
Montclair	Essex	Montclair	x	x	39,977	37,487	x	Deleted prior to the 2010 U.S. census as it was coextensive with a township of the same name
Mount Holly	Burlington	Mount Holly	x	x	x	10,639	10,818	
Neptune Township	Monmouth	Neptune	x	x	x	x	28,366	part used to form Ocean Grove and Shark River Hills CDPs
North Bergen	Hudson	North Bergen	x	x	x	48,414	47,019	
North Brunswick Township	Middlesex		x	x	36,287	31,287	x	Deleted prior to the 2010 U.S. census as it was coextensive with a township of the same name
Nutley	Essex	Nutley / Bloomfield	x	x	27,362	27,099	x	Deleted prior to the 2010 U.S. census as it was coextensive with a township of the same name
Ocean Beach	Ocean		x	x	x	x	1,629	
Ocean Township	Monmouth	Ocean	x	x	x	x	23,570	part used to form Oakhurst CDP and the Wanamassa CDP
Orange	Essex	City of Orange	x	x	32,868	29,925	x	Deleted prior to the 2010 U.S. census as it was coextensive with a township of the same name
Parsippany-Troy Hills Township	Morris	Parsippany-Troy Hills	x	x	x	48,478	49,868	First appeared as an unincorporated community in the 1970 U.S. census under the name Lake Parsippany (pop. 7,488). The CDP was deleted prior to the 1990 U.S. census as it was then coterminus with the township of the same name.
Pennsauken	Camden		x	x	35,737	34,733	33,775	Deleted prior to the 2010 U.S. census as it was coextensive with a township of the same name
Pequannock Township	Morris	Pequannock	x	x	x	12,844	13,776	
Piscatawy	Middlesex		x	x	x	x	42,223	deleted, part to Society Hill CDP
Princeton North	Mercer	Princeton	x	x	4,528	4,386	4,814	Listed as an unincorporated place under the name North Princeton in the 1950 U.S. census (pop. 1,721). The name was changed to Princeton North in the 1960 U.S. census (pop. 4,506) and 1970 U.S. census (pop. 5,488). Deleted prior to the 2010 U.S. census.
Riverside	Burlington		x	x	x	7,974	7,941	Listed as an unincorporated community in the 1950 U.S. census (pop. 7,199). Not listed in the 1960 U.S. census or the 1970 U.S. census.
River Vale	Bergen	River Vale	x	x	9,449	9,410	9,489	Deleted prior to the 2010 U.S. census as it was coextensive with a township of the same name
Rochelle Park	Bergen	Rochelle Park / Saddle Brook	x	x	5,528	5,587	5,603	Deleted prior to the 2010 U.S. census as it was coextensive with a township of the same name
Saddle Brook	Bergen		x	x	13,155	13,296	14,084	Deleted prior to the 2010 U.S. census as it was coextensive with a township of the same name
Scotch Plains	Union	Scotch Plains	x	x	22,732	21,150	20,774	Deleted prior to the 2010 U.S. census as it was coextensive with a township of the same name
Silverton	Ocean	Dover	x	x	x	9,175	7,236	
Society Hill	Middlesex	Piscataway	x	3,829	3,804	3,577	x	Deleted prior to the 2020 U.S. census
South Orange	Essex	South Orange	x	x	16,964	16,390	15,864	Deleted prior to the 2010 U.S. census as it was coextensive with a township of the same name
Springfield	Union	Springfield	x	x	14,429	13,420	13,955	Deleted prior to the 2010 U.S. census as it was coextensive with a township of the same name
Succasunna-Kenvil	Morris	Roxbury	x	x	12,569	11,781	10,931	Listed as an unincorporated community in the 1950 U.S. census (pop. 2,383). It did not appear in subsequent censuses until it was listed as census designated place in the 1980 U.S. census. Split to Kenvil and Succasunna prior to the 2010 U.S. census.
Teaneck	Bergen		x	x	39,260	37,825	39,007	Deleted prior to the 2010 U.S. census as it was coextensive with a township of the same name
Union	Union	Union	x	x	54,405	50,024	50,184	Deleted prior to the 2010 U.S. census as it was coextensive with a township of the same name
Verona	Essex	Verona	x	x	13,533	13,597	x	Deleted prior to the 2010 U.S. census as it was coextensive with a township of the same name
Washington Township	Bergen		x	x	8,938	9,245	9,550	Deleted prior to the 2010 U.S. census as it was coextensive with a township of the same name
Wayne	Passaic		x	x	54,069	47,025	46,474	Deleted prior to the 2010 U.S. census as it was coextensive with a township of the same name
Weehawken	Hudson	Weehawken	x	x	x	12,385	13,168	
West Caldwell	Essex	West Caldwell	x	x	11,233	10,461	x	Deleted prior to the 2010 U.S. census as it was coextensive with a township of the same name
West Milford	Passaic		x	x	26,410	25,430	x	Deleted prior to the 2010 U.S. census as it was coextensive with a township of the same name
West Orange	Essex	West Orange	x	x	44,943	39,103	x	Deleted prior to the 2010 U.S. census as it was coextensive with a township of the same name
Willingboro	Burlington	Willingboro	x	x	x	36,291	39,912	
Winfield	Union	Winfield	x	x	x	x	1,785	
Whitesboro-Burleigh	Cape May	Middle	x	x	1,836	2,080	1,583	split to Burleigh and Whitesboro
Woodbridge Township	Middlesex		x	x	x	x	90,074	deleted; part used to form Avenel, Colonia, Fords, Iselin, Port Reading, Sewaren, and Woodbridge CDPs
Wyckoff	Bergen		x	x	16,508	15,372	15,500	Deleted prior to the 2010 U.S. census as it was coextensive with a township of the same name
Yardville-Groveville	Mercer	Hamilton	x	x	9,208	9,414	x	split to Groveville and Yardville

== See also ==
- List of counties in New Jersey
- List of municipalities in New Jersey
- Local government in New Jersey
