= Society Hill (disambiguation) =

Society Hill is a historic neighborhood of Philadelphia.

Society Hill may also refer to:

- "Society Hill" (Body of Proof), an episode of Body of Proof
- Society Hill, Alabama, an unincorporated community
- Society Hill, Middlesex County, New Jersey, an unincorporated community
- Society Hill, South Carolina, a town in Darlington County
- Society Hill Historic District (Portage, Wisconsin)
- Society Hill, a housing development in Droyer's Point, Jersey City, New Jersey

== See also ==
- Society Hill Towers
- Society Hill Synagogue
