= Jim Curry (baseball) =

American baseball player (1886–1938)

- Second baseman
- Born: March 10, 1886; Camden, New Jersey, U.S.
- Died: August 2, 1938 (aged 52); Grenloch, New Jersey, U.S.
- Batted: Right Threw: Right

MLB debut
- October 2, 1909, for the Philadelphia Athletics

Last MLB appearance
- July 12, 1918, for the Detroit Tigers

MLB statistics
- Batting average: .229
- Home runs: 0
- Runs batted in: 0
- Stats at Baseball Reference

Teams
- Philadelphia Athletics (1909); New York Highlanders (1911); Detroit Tigers (1918)

James L. Curry (March 10, 1886 – August 2, 1938) was an American second baseman in Major League Baseball. He was born on March 10, 1886, in Camden, New Jersey. He was 5 foot 11 and 160 pounds. In 1909, Curry played one game for the Philadelphia Athletics. In 1911 he played with the New York Highlanders in four games, and in 1918 he played for the Detroit Tigers for five games. In his career, Curry went 8-for-35 for a .229 batting average.

Curry died on August 2, 1938, in Grenloch, New Jersey.

== Enternal links ==
- Career statistics from Baseball Reference · Baseball Reference (Minors) · Retrosheet · Baseball Almanac
