= Barclay-Kingston, New Jersey =

Populated place in Camden County, New Jersey, US

- Former census-designated place
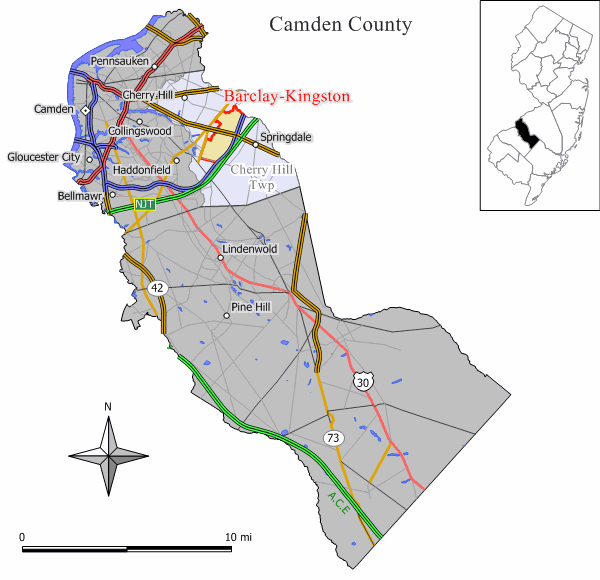
- Map of Barclay-Kingston CDP in Camden County
- Coordinates: 39°54′36″N 74°59′45″W
- Country: United States
- State: New Jersey
- County: Camden
- Township: Cherry Hill

Area
  - Total: 2.9 sq mi (7.4 km^{2})
  - Land: 2.9 sq mi (7.4 km^{2})
  - Water: 0 sq mi (0.0 km^{2})

Population (2000 census)
  - Total: 10,728
  - Density: 3,765/sq mi (1,453.6/km^{2})
- Time zone: UTC−05:00 (Eastern (EST))
  - Summer (DST): UTC−04:00 (EDT)
- FIPS code: 34-02905

Barclay-Kingston is an unincorporated community and former census-designated place (CDP) located within Cherry Hill Township, in Camden County, in the U.S. state of New Jersey. As of the 2000 United States census, the section population was 10,728. In the 2010 United States census, the Barclay-Kingston CDP was split into two new CDPs, Barclay and Kingston Estates.

== Geography ==
Barclay-Kingston is located at 39°54′36″N 74°59′45″W (39.909863, -74.995912).

According to the United States Census Bureau, the CDP has a total area of 7.4 km^{2} (2.9 sq mi), all of it land.

Some notable areas within Barclay-Kingston are Barclay Farms and Kingston Estates. Barclay Farm House is a historic farmhouse located in the Barclay Farms neighborhood.

== Demographics ==
Barclay-Kingston first appeared as a census designated place in the 2000 U.S. census created from part of the deleted Cherry Hill CDP. The CDP was split into the Barclay and Kingston Estates CDPs prior to the 2010 U.S. census.

As of the 2000 United States census there were 10,728 people, 4,106 households, and 3,034 families residing in the CDP. The population density was 1,453.4 people/km^{2} (3,764 people/mi^{2}). There were 4,214 housing units at an average density of 570.9 units/km^{2} (1,479 units/mi^{2}). The racial makeup of the CDP was 87.35% White, 3.60% African American, 0.17% Native American, 6.84% Asian, 0.01% Pacific Islander, 0.65% from other races, and 1.38% from two or more races. Hispanic or Latino of any race were 2.27% of the population.

There were 4,106 households, out of which 31.2% had children under the age of 18 living with them, 63.7% were married couples living together, 7.6% had a female householder with no husband present, and 26.1% were non-families. 22.6% of all households were made up of individuals, and 12.4% had someone living alone who was 65 years of age or older. The average household size was 2.60 and the average family size was 3.07.

In the CDP the population was spread out, with 23.7% under the age of 18, 5.6% from 18 to 24, 25.8% from 25 to 44, 25.3% from 45 to 64, and 19.5% who were 65 years of age or older. The median age was 42 years. For every 100 females there were 94.7 males. For every 100 females age 18 and over, there were 90.2 males.

The median income for a household in the CDP was $68,561, and the median income for a family was $78,465. Males had a median income of $52,403 versus $37,650 for females. The per capita income for the CDP was $32,259. About 2.1% of families and 2.6% of the population were below the poverty line, including 2.4% of those under age 18 and 3.3% of those age 65 or over.
