= Barclay, New Jersey =

Populated place in Camden County, New Jersey, US

Barclay Farm, New Jersey
- Census-designated place
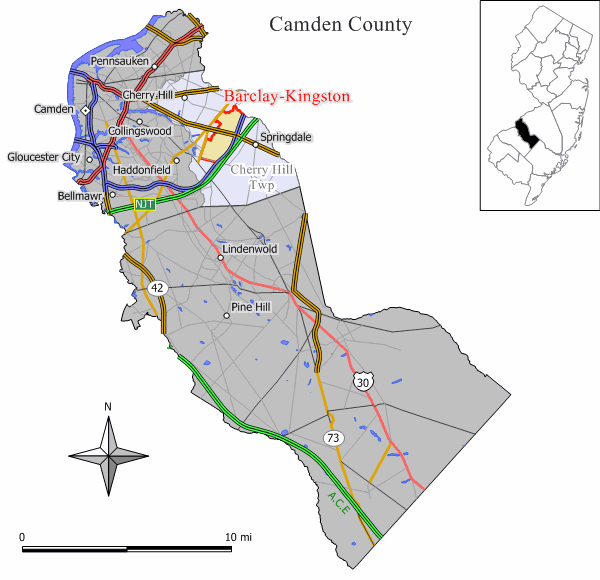
- Map of the former Barclay-Kingston CDP in Camden County. Inset: Location of Camden County in New Jersey.

- Location in Camden County Location in New Jersey Location in the United States
- Coordinates: 39.901243°N 75.000829°W
- Country: United States
- State: New Jersey
- County: Camden
- Township: Cherry Hill

Area
  - Total: 1.66 sq mi (4.30 km^{2})
  - Land: 1.66 sq mi (4.30 km^{2})
  - Water: 0 sq mi (0.00 km^{2}) 0.00%
- Elevation: 43 ft (13 m)

Population (2020)
  - Total: 4,656
  - Density: 2,806.7/sq mi (1,083.66/km^{2})
- Time zone: UTC−05:00 (Eastern (EST))
  - Summer (DST): UTC−04:00 (EDT)
- Area code: 856
- FIPS code: 34-02880
- GNIS feature ID: 02389172

Barclay Farm (or simply Barclay) is an unincorporated community and census-designated place (CDP) located within Cherry Hill, in Camden County, in the U.S. state of New Jersey, that had been part of the Barclay-Kingston CDP until 2000, which was split to form the CDPs of Barclay and Kingston Estates as of the 2010 Census. As of the 2020 census, Barclay had a population of 4,656.

Located on a 32-acre (13 ha) site, the Barclay Farm House is a historic farmhouse constructed in 1816. The property is listed on the National Register of Historic Places and is operated by the township to provide visitors with insight into Cherry Hill and its past as an agricultural center.

== Geography ==
According to the United States Census Bureau, Barclay Farm had a total area of 1.659 square miles (4.297 km^{2}), all of which was land.

== Demographics ==
Historical population
Census	Pop.	Note	%±
2010	4,428		—
2020	4,656		5.1%
source: 2010 2020

Barclay first appeared as a census designated place in the 2010 U.S. Census formed along with the Kingston Estates CDP from the deleted Barclay-Kingston CDP.

=== Racial and ethnic composition ===
Barclay CDP, New Jersey – Racial and ethnic composition Note: the US Census treats Hispanic/Latino as an ethnic category. This table excludes Latinos from the racial categories and assigns them to a separate category. Hispanics/Latinos may be of any race.
Race / Ethnicity (NH = Non-Hispanic)	Pop 2010	Pop 2020	% 2010	% 2020
White alone (NH)	4,095	4,030	92.48%	86.55%
Black or African American alone (NH)	45	99	1.02%	2.13%
Native American or Alaska Native alone (NH)	2	1	0.05%	0.02%
Asian alone (NH)	116	176	2.62%	3.78%
Native Hawaiian or Pacific Islander alone (NH)	0	1	0.00%	0.02%
Other race alone (NH)	12	35	0.27%	0.75%
Mixed race or Multiracial (NH)	44	136	0.99%	2.92%
Hispanic or Latino (any race)	114	178	2.57%	3.82%
Total	4,428	4,656	100.00%	100.00%

=== 2020 census ===
As of the 2020 census, Barclay had a population of 4,656. The median age was 42.5 years. 24.9% of residents were under the age of 18 and 19.1% of residents were 65 years of age or older. For every 100 females there were 95.2 males, and for every 100 females age 18 and over there were 93.7 males age 18 and over.

100.0% of residents lived in urban areas, while 0.0% lived in rural areas.

There were 1,626 households in Barclay, of which 37.6% had children under the age of 18 living in them. Of all households, 73.4% were married-couple households, 8.5% were households with a male householder and no spouse or partner present, and 14.6% were households with a female householder and no spouse or partner present. About 13.0% of all households were made up of individuals and 7.7% had someone living alone who was 65 years of age or older.

There were 1,663 housing units, of which 2.2% were vacant. The homeowner vacancy rate was 1.1% and the rental vacancy rate was 0.0%.

=== 2010 census ===
The 2010 United States census counted 4,428 people, 1,621 households, and 1,334 families in the CDP. The population density was 2,669.2 per square mile (1,030.6/km^{2}). There were 1,651 housing units at an average density of 995.2 per square mile (384.2/km^{2}). The racial makeup was 94.60% (4,189) White, 1.08% (48) Black or African American, 0.07% (3) Native American, 2.62% (116) Asian, 0.00% (0) Pacific Islander, 0.50% (22) from other races, and 1.13% (50) from two or more races. Hispanic or Latino of any race were 2.57% (114) of the population.

Of the 1,621 households, 33.2% had children under the age of 18; 73.3% were married couples living together; 7.0% had a female householder with no husband present and 17.7% were non-families. Of all households, 15.1% were made up of individuals and 8.3% had someone living alone who was 65 years of age or older. The average household size was 2.73 and the average family size was 3.04.

23.7% of the population were under the age of 18, 6.2% from 18 to 24, 19.3% from 25 to 44, 33.9% from 45 to 64, and 16.9% who were 65 years of age or older. The median age was 45.5 years. For every 100 females, the population had 96.8 males. For every 100 females ages 18 and older there were 93.6 males.
