= Renaissance at Monroe, New Jersey =

Populated place in Middlesex County, New Jersey, US

Renaissance at Monroe
- Census-designated place
- Location in Middlesex County Location in New Jersey Location in the United States
- Coordinates: 40°15′48″N 74°28′51″W
- Country: United States
- State: New Jersey
- County: Middlesex
- Township: Monroe

Area
  - Total: 0.17 sq mi (0.45 km^{2})
  - Land: 0.17 sq mi (0.45 km^{2})
  - Water: 0 sq mi (0.00 km^{2})
- Elevation: 115 ft (35 m)

Population (2020)
  - Total: 637
  - Density: 3,640.7/sq mi (1,405.67/km^{2})
- Time zone: UTC−05:00 (Eastern (EST))
  - Summer (DST): UTC−04:00 (EDT)
- ZIP Code: 08831 (Monroe Township)
- Area codes: 732/848
- FIPS code: 34-62605
- GNIS feature ID: 2806178

Renaissance at Monroe is a planned community and census-designated place (CDP) in Monroe Township, Middlesex County, New Jersey, United States. It was first listed as a CDP in the 2020 census with a population of 637.

== Geography ==
The community is in the southernmost part of Middlesex County, in the southwest part of Monroe Township, bordered to the east by Monroe Manor and to the west by East Windsor Township in Mercer County. New Jersey Route 33 forms the northern edge of the community; it leads 1.5 miles (2.4 km) west to Exit 8 on the New Jersey Turnpike and 11 miles (18 km) east to Freehold.

According to the U.S. Census Bureau, the CDP has an area of 0.175 square miles (0.453 km^{2}), all land. It sits on a slight rise between the Millstone River to the north and Rocky Brook, a tributary of the Millstone, to the south. Via the Millstone River, the community is part of the Raritan River watershed.

== Demographics ==
Historical population
Census	Pop.	Note	%±
2020	637		—
U.S. Decennial Census; 2020

Renaissance at Monroe first appeared as a census designated place in the 2020 U.S. census.

=== 2020 census ===
Renaissance at Monroe CDP, New Jersey – Racial and ethnic composition Note: the US Census treats Hispanic/Latino as an ethnic category. This table excludes Latinos from the racial categories and assigns them to a separate category. Hispanics/Latinos may be of any race.
Race / Ethnicity (NH = Non-Hispanic)	Pop 2020	% 2020
White alone (NH)	532	83.52%
Black or African American alone (NH)	11	1.73%
Native American or Alaska Native alone (NH)	1	0.16%
Asian alone (NH)	41	6.44%
Native Hawaiian or Pacific Islander alone (NH)	0	0.00%
Other Race alone (NH)	4	0.63%
Mixed race or Multiracial (NH)	8	1.26%
Hispanic or Latino (any race)	40	6.28%
Total	637	100.00%
