= Mount Tabor, New Jersey =

Populated place in Morris County, New Jersey, US

- Census-designated place
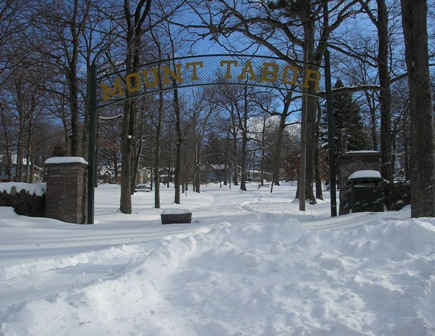
- The entrance to Mount Tabor on Route 53 as seen during the winter

- Location in Morris County Location in New Jersey Location in the United States
- Country: United States
- State: New Jersey
- County: Morris
- Township: Parsippany–Troy Hills
- Named for: Mount Tabor, Israel

Area
  - Total: 0.386 sq mi (1.00 km^{2})
  - Land: 0.385 sq mi (1.00 km^{2})
  - Water: 0.001 sq mi (0.0026 km^{2})

Population (2020)
  - Total: 1,244
- ZIP Codes: 07878 (Mount Tabor); 07950 (Morris Plains)
- FIPS code: 34-49290

Mount Tabor is an unincorporated community and census-designated place (CDP) in Parsippany–Troy Hills Township, Morris County, New Jersey, United States. As of the 2020 census, the population was 1,244. The community was originally established as a self-governing Methodist camp meeting site.

The Mount Tabor Historic District was listed on both the National Register of Historic Places and the state register in 2015.

== History ==
=== Founding ===
Camp meetings, which are outdoor religious revival services, began for the purpose of revitalizing faith, particularly in the aftermath of the American Civil War. In 1866, under the authority of the officers of the Newark Conference of the Methodist Episcopal Church, the "Newark Conference Camp Meeting Association of Methodists" operated several annual camp meetings at Lake Speedwell near Morristown, New Jersey. When the owner of the land eventually told the Camp Meeting Association that he was going to sell the property, a group began searching the countryside for a new campsite; they chose a wooded spread of land thick with underbrush and set upon a hill, which they named "Mount Tabor", after the location mentioned in the Bible as the place of Christ's Transfiguration.

The hill they found for the relocation of the Newark Conference camp meeting was part of a piece of farmland owned by Stephan Dickerson. Dickerson's farmhouse was located on what is now the first hole of the Mount Tabor Country Club. The house was torn down years ago, but its cornerstone is now located in the chimney of a house formerly owned by a member of the Dickerson family at the corner of Route 53 and Durbin Avenue. As part of the agreement of sale, the Dickersons were given the right to operate a store within the campground. The Dickerson family had owned the Foodtown store at the bottom of the hill on Route 53, however it was closed in 2018 due to dwindling business.

=== Incorporation of the camp meeting in 1869 ===
On March 17, 1869, the incorporation of the "Camp Meeting Association of the Newark Conference of the Methodist Episcopal Church" came about by virtue of the passage of New Jersey Chapter Law 185 of the Legislative Session of 1869, enacted into law by both the New Jersey Senate and the New Jersey General Assembly.

The chapter law gave the Newark Conference of the Methodist Episcopal Church the right to operate a religious camp meeting and allowed the church to exercise specific municipal powers with regard to its camp grounds in Mount Tabor.

The Mount Tabor camp meeting was located in what was then Hanover Township. In 1928, Hanover Township was divided into three municipalities, and Mount Tabor became part of the newly formed township of Parsippany–Troy Hills.

In 1869, the same year Mount Tabor was incorporated, the Newark Conference began to establish another camp meeting in Ocean Grove, at the Jersey Shore. This was the premier camp meeting of the Newark Conference and one of the jewels in the crown of the Methodist Episcopal Church.

Mount Tabor saw significant popularity as a religious retreat in its early days, but its popularity declined as the general interest in the Methodist religious revival movement gradually decreased over the years. Mount Tabor ceased to be a true religious camp meeting by about 1891, although a United Methodist church remains within the community, which had merged with two other Methodist churches (Methodist Episcopal Church, South, and the Methodist Protestant Church).

Mount Tabor's status as a municipality continued until December 31, 1979, when, as a result of a lawsuit brought against Ocean Grove regarding separation of church and state, the New Jersey Supreme Court took away most municipal powers from Mount Tabor and Ocean Grove. The state supreme court forced each community to become officially incorporated into the neighboring municipalities of Parsippany-Troy Hills and Neptune Township, respectively. Since then, the remaining municipal duties were transferred to Parsippany.

Today, the Camp Meeting Association of the Newark Conference of the Methodist Church, the "CMA", exists as a homeowner association, deriving its power from the homeowners, much like a typical condo or townhouse association. The CMA is governed by twelve elected homeowners, empowered to act as the board of trustees of the CMA. Mount Tabor homeowners own their houses but lease the land on which the homes are built (a land-lease arrangement). The land is leased yearly from the CMA for a nominal amount.

=== Camp meetings ===
In August 1869, crowds of Methodist campers, many of whom were from the large industrial cities in northern New Jersey, gathered in the rustic area for the ten-day camp meeting. Before living in tents, many members set up home in their horse-driven wagons in which they had ridden to the camp meeting. Many tent owners built wooden floors and cabinets inside their tents to protect belongings from the long, cold winter when the campers returned home. (This unique style of summer tent living can still be seen in Ocean Grove.) Over the years the more affluent members of the community, prominent lawyers, ministers and doctors from the Jersey City, Newark, Paterson, Elizabeth and Morristown areas, were building decorative Victorian-style homes (albeit small enough to fit on the 16-by-32-foot (4.9 by 9.8 m) tent lots), to make their encampment in the summer more comfortable.

The annual camp meetings, held for about ten days each August, were facilitated by the Camp Meeting Association trustees under the oversight of the Newark Conference of the Methodist Episcopal Church. The main focus of the camp meeting was to conduct religious services, which included preaching and prayer, and for the purpose of religious education.

Religious services were held once a day (Monday through Saturday), and three times on Sunday. During one early Sunday camp meeting it was said that such an enormous crowd of people (of up to 10,000) gathered that, besides the three regular services, two additional ministers preached simultaneously at different areas in Trinity Place, sometimes known as "The Circle". In addition to attending services, families strolled along trails which wound their way through the woodlands of Mount Tabor and Tabor Lake.

Those campers unaccustomed to "roughing it" in tents could choose to board at the new Arlington Hotel. The hotel was built in 1877 by Trustee David Campbell with the understanding that when he had reimbursed himself from its income, the building would become the property of the association. However, over time the quaint Arlington fell into such disrepair it had to be taken down many years ago. Part of the foundation remains and is being used as a retaining wall for the town's parking lot.

Over the years, the crowds that swarmed into Mount Tabor for the annual Camp Meeting diminished except for a few hundred persons who decided to stay and set up year-round homes where tents once stood. Some older residents who attended the camp meetings believed the decreasing crowds were caused by regulations such as the one that prohibited parking of wagons on the campgrounds. This measure was enacted to deal with the numbers of people who came to the camp meetings purely for the pleasure of the surroundings. Traffic in the town would be banned from midnight Sunday to midnight Monday, much as it was in Ocean Grove until 1980. In 1911, as allowed by the charter of 1869, homes were established under a 99-year lease to the Camp Meeting Association (home prices ranged from $300 to $2,500). In 1969, the 99-year leases ended and were renewed as a perpetual lease. Mount Tabor homeowners (known as "leaseholders") paid a yearly rent to the Camp Meeting Association for their lots with their town assessment and township taxes. The association rent is now proportionately low; two dollars per year for small lots and four dollars a year for the larger ones.

As the tents gave way to small cottages, development in Mount Tabor spread out from Trinity Place, an area that included three octagonal buildings - the Tabernacle, Bethel, and Ebenezer pavilions. Since there were no longer crowds of people, the Bethel was large enough to house the townspeople during Sunday service. A minister was hired each Sunday by the CMA to lead services in this building. Used as a court when Mount Tabor was a municipality (with the basement acting as the jail), the Bethel is now used for civic affairs, residents' use, and by the Board of Trustees for monthly public meetings.

=== Children's Day ===
What has come to be known as Children's Day started in the 1870s as a Sunday School parade around Trinity Place, the original location of the camp meeting religious services. Following the parade, the children were treated to ice cream, compliments of Day's ice cream tent (a Day's Ice Cream store still exists in Ocean Grove).

The Children's Day custom is known as "Walking Day" in England, where churches organize parades, provide refreshments to participants and generally have a holiday. Children's Day has evolved into a unique community festival in Mount Tabor and is still a focal point of summer on "The Hill".

=== Development as a community ===
Water has been, by necessity, an important aspect in the development of Mount Tabor. From the beginning, shallow lines existed to provide water to residents. However, they had to be drained for the winter for fear of freezing, thus preventing year-round occupancy. In 1909 deep water mains were laid in the streets and a standpipe erected, allowing water to be provided to winter residents. As the years passed, water from the Tabor wells became affected by vegetable matter, and it was found necessary to employ water from township wells. A contract was entered with Parsippany-Troy Hills Township, and this is how the community gets its water today. Now the water tower in St. John's park functions only as a reminder of the past.

During the Great Depression, many properties were allowed to decay and deteriorate, and large sums of unpaid assessments accumulated. In 1932 there was still $8,000 of the bonds of 1909 outstanding, but by careful management and diligent collection of back assessments these bonds were paid off and the mortgage burned on October 1, 1934. Since then there has been no debt and Mount Tabor is running strictly on a cash basis, with a budget of approximately a quarter million dollars. If assessments are paid promptly, the Board of Trustees expects to continue public improvement out of annual income.

As the years rolled by, many cottages were converted into winter residences by connection with deep water mains and by the modernization of walls and heating apparatus. A chestnut blight came and devastated the stately trees in the town. In 1935, 62 cottages were occupied during winter; in 1938 this number had increased to 109. The last summer residence was winterized in 2001.

The late 1940s brought many physical changes to Mount Tabor. Among these were the hard surfacing of the roads and the renovating of the basement of the Tabernacle for the CMA, the fire department, and the post office. After World War II, Mount Tabor felt that the time had come for a real church building. Former Pastor Robert Simpson recently related that they decided against putting the church in the midst of the Hill (St. Johns park area was under consideration) because they did not want it to be a "small town church", but rather one that would welcome everyone from both Tabor and the rest of the world.

Property was set aside in what was then the Main Park for the United Methodist Church of Mount Tabor, which rose in 1948 through the combined efforts of the members of the church and the citizens of Mount Tabor (many of whom were not members). This coalition, called the "Builder's Club" that has since dissolved, was another demonstration of the bond of friendship that guided the citizens of Mount Tabor through the years. When completed, it offered a practical and convenient meeting house: it was in Tabor; it was large enough; and it was heated. Thus, it replaced the other buildings for the purpose of services and other church-related functions.

=== Since the 1950s ===
In the 1950s, a parking lot was built in the Main Park to provide space for the influx of automobiles. This decade also saw the formation of the Tabor Junior Rifle Club. This organization proved its usefulness when, after the dump closed, it became rat infested. Each weekend, members practiced on these moving targets, thus controlling the varmint colony and keeping it from invading the town.

The 1960s evidenced Mount Tabor's concern for its children. A playground was constructed in the main park, a basketball court was built at the golf course, and a skating rink was built below the old pump house.

During the 1970s and 1980s, the changes that were occurring in the United States were reflected in Mount Tabor. Many houses and buildings were not maintained as well as they should have been, and rebellious youth made their presence known. Fortunately, this trend has been reversed in the last decades, and an appreciation for the past has become strongly evident. In this period septic systems (some of which were under the buildings they served, while others were community systems serving more than one residence) were filled in and replaced with a city sewer system. The unsightly steel tank next to the water tower was removed, and one by one, the CMA started refurbishing the buildings they owned to their former glory; so far the old firehouse, the Town Manager's house, and the Tabernacle have had facelifts and more. In addition, through the cooperative efforts of the citizens of Mount Tabor, the Trinity Park fountain was installed. The fountain was designed in the image of the previous fountain, which had been removed many years before.

In the early 1990s, Parsippany enacted an ordinance to designate the whole of Mount Tabor, along with a number of other sites, as having landmark status. After opposition from a handful of residents to the blanket designation, the ordinance was eventually amended to exclude Mount Tabor. This ordinance has been challenged and overturned since that time. A major portion of the community was listed on the National Register of Historic Places as a historic district in 2015.

== Community structure ==
=== Board of trustees ===
The Board of Trustees, composed of twelve resident leaseholders of Mount Tabor, manages affairs. The trustees are elected by leaseholders at the annual meeting in groups of four for three-year terms; the terms are divided so that four trustees are chosen each year. The officers of the CPO are President, Vice President, Secretary, and Treasurer. Each officer is elected annually by the Board of Trustees.

=== Mount Tabor Fire Department ===
The Mount Tabor Fire Department was organized on June 11, 1910, to provide fire protection services to the community. Today, the department has expanded to include a large portion of Parsippany, but still covers Mount Tabor. The Mount Tabor Fire Department has expanded beyond its single firehouse located on Simpson Avenue to a total of three fire houses throughout the southwest part of Parsippany. MTVFD is one of six fire districts in the Township of Parsippany–Troy Hills.

=== Mount Tabor Country Club ===
At the end of the summer of 1900, the Tabor Field Club was organized. Since its incorporation in 1904 the name has been changed to the Mount Tabor Country Club. In 1901, the club opened a golf course consisting of six holes and using tin cans as cups. In 1908, the lowest meadow, previously a marsh, was reclaimed and the golf course extended into nine holes. In 1911 the present club house was built. The property is leased from the CMA by the Mount Tabor Country Club.

=== Mount Tabor Record ===
The Mount Tabor Record was a local newspaper published between 1877 and 1887. It described events and life in Mount Tabor, such as the Sunday sermons, and sketches of everyday life. It was published at various times in Dover and Morristown. It is available for viewing at the Drew University Library Catalogue.

Today, a Mount Tabor Record is privately published by a resident.

== Geography ==
Mount Tabor is in central Morris County, in the western part of Parsippany–Troy Hills Township. A small portion of the Mount Tabor census-designated place extends into Denville Township to the northwest. New Jersey Route 53 passes through the community, leading south 3 miles (5 km) to Morris Plains and north less than 2 miles (3 km) to Denville. The center of Parsippany is 3 miles (5 km) to the east via local roads.

According to the U.S. Census Bureau, the Mount Tabor CDP has an area of 0.39 square miles (1.01 km^{2}), of which 0.001 square miles (0.003 km^{2}), or 0.26%, are water. Mount Tabor Lake and Powder Mill Pond lie outside the CDP, across the Morristown Line rail tracks. The community drains southward via Watnong Brook toward the Whippany River, part of the Passaic River watershed.

== Demographics ==
Historical population
Census	Pop.	Note	%±
2020	1,244		—
U.S. Decennial Census; 2020

Mount Tabor was first listed as a census designated place in the 2020 U.S. census.

Mount Tabor CDP, New Jersey – Racial and ethnic composition Note: the US Census treats Hispanic/Latino as an ethnic category. This table excludes Latinos from the racial categories and assigns them to a separate category. Hispanics/Latinos may be of any race.
Race / Ethnicity (NH = Non-Hispanic)	Pop 2020	2020
White alone (NH)	902	72.51%
Black or African American alone (NH)	44	3.54%
Native American or Alaska Native alone (NH)	1	0.08%
Asian alone (NH)	126	10.13%
Native Hawaiian or Pacific Islander alone (NH)	0	0.00%
Other race alone (NH)	13	1.05%
Mixed race or Multiracial (NH)	50	4.02%
Hispanic or Latino (any race)	108	8.68%
Total	1,244	100.00%
