= Crandon Lakes, New Jersey =

Populated place in Sussex County, New Jersey, US

- Census-designated place
- Map of Crandon Lakes in Sussex County. Inset: Location of Sussex County in New Jersey.

- Location in Sussex County Location in New Jersey Location in the United States
- Coordinates: 41.122688°N 74.840523°W
- Country: United States
- State: New Jersey
- County: Sussex
- Townships: Hampton; Stillwater

Area
  - Total: 2.68 sq mi (6.93 km^{2})
  - Land: 2.56 sq mi (6.62 km^{2})
  - Water: 0.12 sq mi (0.32 km^{2}) 4.57%
- Elevation: 869 ft (265 m)

Population (2020)
  - Total: 1,120
  - Density: 438.4/sq mi (169.26/km^{2})
- Time zone: UTC−05:00 (Eastern (EST))
  - Summer (DST): UTC−04:00 (Eastern (EDT))
- Area codes: 862/973
- FIPS code: 34-15610
- GNIS feature ID: 02389370

Crandon Lakes is an unincorporated community and census-designated place (CDP) split between Hampton Township and Stillwater Township, in Sussex County, in the U.S. state of New Jersey. As of the 2020 census, Crandon Lakes had a population of 1,120.

== Geography ==
According to the United States Census Bureau, the CDP had a total area of 2.675 square miles (6.93 km^{2}), including 2.553 square miles (6.61 km^{2}) of land and 0.122 square miles (0.32 km^{2}) of water (4.57%).

== Demographics ==
Historical population
Census	Pop.	Note	%±
1980	1,083		—
1990	1,177		8.7%
2000	1,180		0.3%
2010	1,178		−0.2%
2020	1,120		−4.9%
Population sources: 1950 1960 1970; 1980 1990 2000; 2010 2020

Crandon lakes first appeared as a census designated place in the 1980 U.S. census.

=== 2020 census ===
Crandon Lakes CDP, New Jersey – Racial and ethnic composition Note: the US Census treats Hispanic/Latino as an ethnic category. This table excludes Latinos from the racial categories and assigns them to a separate category. Hispanics/Latinos may be of any race.
Race / Ethnicity (NH = Non-Hispanic)	Pop 2000	Pop 2010	Pop 2020	% 2000	% 2010	% 2020
White alone (NH)	1,139	1,114	1,029	96.53%	94.57%	91.88%
Black or African American alone (NH)	4	7	3	0.34%	0.59%	0.27%
Native American or Alaska Native alone (NH)	4	0	1	0.34%	0.00%	0.09%
Asian alone (NH)	6	13	9	0.51%	1.10%	0.80%
Native Hawaiian or Pacific Islander alone (NH)	0	0	0	0.00%	0.00%	0.00%
Other race alone (NH)	1	0	3	0.08%	0.00%	0.27%
Mixed race or Multiracial (NH)	12	8	42	1.02%	0.68%	3.75%
Hispanic or Latino (any race)	14	36	33	1.19%	3.06%	2.95%
Total	1,180	1,178	1,120	100.00%	100.00%	100.00%

=== 2010 census ===
The 2010 United States census counted 1,178 people, 441 households, and 334 families in the CDP. The population density was 461.5 people per square mile (178.2 people/km^{2}). There were 514 housing units at an average density of 201.4 units per square mile (77.8 units/km^{2}). The racial makeup was 97.37% (1,147) White, 0.59% (7) Black or African American, 0.00% (0) Native American, 1.10% (13) Asian, 0.00% (0) Pacific Islander, 0.00% (0) from other races, and 0.93% (11) from two or more races. Hispanic or Latino of any race were 3.06% (36) of the population.

Of the 441 households, 32.7% had children under the age of 18; 63.5% were married couples living together; 6.6% had a female householder with no husband present and 24.3% were non-families. Of all households, 19.5% were made up of individuals and 6.6% had someone living alone who was 65 years of age or older. The average household size was 2.67 and the average family size was 3.05.

23.2% of the population were under the age of 18, 7.6% from 18 to 24, 24.2% from 25 to 44, 32.9% from 45 to 64, and 12.1% who were 65 years of age or older. The median age was 41.2 years. For every 100 females, the population had 97.7 males. For every 100 females ages 18 and older there were 98.9 males.

=== 2000 census ===
As of the 2000 United States census there were 1,180 people, 405 households, and 326 families living in the CDP. The population density was 180.1 people/km^{2} (466 people/mi^{2}). There were 492 housing units at an average density of 75.1 units/km^{2} (195 units/mi^{2}). The racial makeup of the CDP was 97.71% White, 0.34% African American, 0.34% Native American, 0.51% Asian, 0.08% from other races, and 1.02% from two or more races. Hispanic or Latino of any race were 1.19% of the population.

There were 405 households, out of which 45.9% had children under the age of 18 living with them, 66.2% were married couples living together, 10.4% had a female householder with no husband present, and 19.5% were non-families. 15.1% of all households were made up of individuals, and 6.7% had someone living alone who was 65 years of age or older. The average household size was 2.91 and the average family size was 3.26.

In the CDP the population was spread out, with 29.5% under the age of 18, 6.5% from 18 to 24, 33.1% from 25 to 44, 23.1% from 45 to 64, and 7.8% who were 65 years of age or older. The median age was 36 years. For every 100 females, there were 96.0 males. For every 100 females age 18 and over, there were 93.0 males.

The median income for a household in the CDP was $56,188, and the median income for a family was $60,114. Males had a median income of $50,281 versus $36,429 for females. The per capita income for the CDP was $22,642. About 0.9% of families and 1.5% of the population were below the poverty line, including 1.2% of those under age 18 and none of those age 65 or over.
