= Kingston Estates, New Jersey =

Populated place in Camden County, New Jersey, US

- Census-designated place
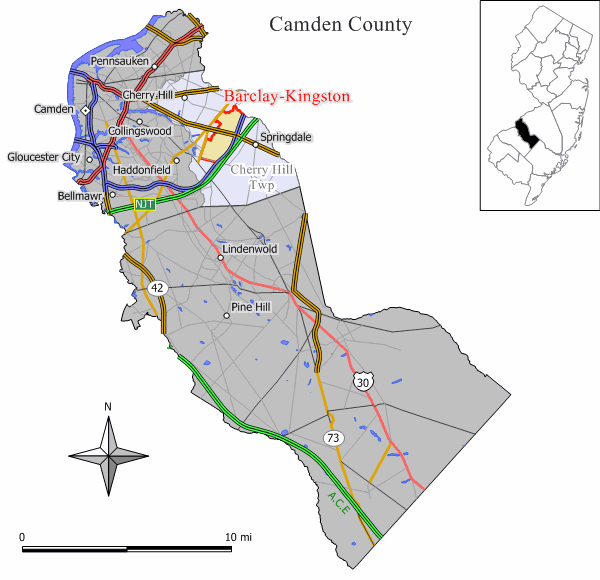
- Map of the former Barclay-Kingston CDP in Camden County. Inset: Location of Camden County in New Jersey.

- Location in Camden County Location in New Jersey Location in the United States
- Coordinates: 39.918085°N 74.990185°W
- Country: United States
- State: New Jersey
- County: Camden
- Township: Cherry Hill

Area
  - Total: 1.16 sq mi (3.00 km^{2})
  - Land: 1.16 sq mi (3.00 km^{2})
  - Water: 0 sq mi (0.00 km^{2}) 0.13%
- Elevation: 43 ft (13 m)

Population (2020)
  - Total: 6,322
  - Density: 5,459.4/sq mi (2,107.9/km^{2})
- Time zone: UTC−05:00 (Eastern (EST))
  - Summer (DST): UTC−04:00 (EDT)
- Area code: 856
- FIPS code: 34-36960
- GNIS feature ID: 02389172

Kingston Estates is an unincorporated community and census-designated place (CDP) located within Cherry Hill, in Camden County, in the U.S. state of New Jersey, that had been part of the Barclay-Kingston CDP until the 2000 census, which was split to form the CDPs of Barclay and Kingston Estates as of the 2010 Census. As of the 2020 census, Kingston Estates had a population of 6,322.

== Geography ==
According to the United States Census Bureau, the CDP had a total area of 1.164 square miles (3.013 km^{2}), including 1.162 square miles (3.009 km^{2}) of land and 0.002 square miles (0.004 km^{2}) of water (0.13%).

== Demographics ==
Historical population
Census	Pop.	Note	%±
2010	5,685		—
2020	6,322		11.2%
source: 2010 2020

Kingston Estates first appeared as a census designated place in the 2010 U.S. Census formed along with the Barclay CDP from the deleted Barclay-Kingston CDP.

=== Racial and ethnic composition ===
Kingston Estates CDP, New Jersey – Racial and ethnic composition Note: the US Census treats Hispanic/Latino as an ethnic category. This table excludes Latinos from the racial categories and assigns them to a separate category. Hispanics/Latinos may be of any race.
Race / Ethnicity (NH = Non-Hispanic)	Pop 2010	Pop 2020	% 2010	% 2020
White alone (NH)	4,175	3,893	73.44%	61.58%
Black or African American alone (NH)	386	616	6.79%	9.74%
Native American or Alaska Native alone (NH)	5	6	0.09%	0.09%
Asian alone (NH)	700	1,052	12.31%	16.64%
Native Hawaiian or Pacific Islander alone (NH)	1	0	0.02%	0.00%
Other race alone (NH)	6	38	0.11%	0.60%
Mixed race or Multiracial (NH)	117	213	2.06%	3.37%
Hispanic or Latino (any race)	295	504	5.19%	7.97%
Total	5,685	6,322	100.00%	100.00%

=== 2020 census ===
As of the 2020 census, Kingston Estates had a population of 6,322. The median age was 41.3 years. 19.5% of residents were under the age of 18 and 21.2% were 65 years of age or older. For every 100 females, there were 94.9 males, and for every 100 females age 18 and over, there were 89.1 males age 18 and over.

100.0% of residents lived in urban areas, while 0.0% lived in rural areas.

There were 2,485 households in Kingston Estates, of which 28.3% had children under the age of 18 living in them. Of all households, 49.4% were married-couple households, 17.6% were households with a male householder and no spouse or partner present, and 26.3% were households with a female householder and no spouse or partner present. About 27.0% of all households were made up of individuals and 12.4% had someone living alone who was 65 years of age or older.

There were 2,603 housing units, of which 4.5% were vacant. The homeowner vacancy rate was 0.8% and the rental vacancy rate was 6.4%.

=== 2010 census ===
The 2010 United States census counted 5,685 people, 2,191 households, and 1,510 families in the CDP. The population density was 4,893.3 per square mile (1,889.3/km^{2}). There were 2,553 housing units at an average density of 2,197.5 per square mile (848.5/km^{2}). The racial makeup was 76.66% (4,358) White, 6.95% (395) Black or African American, 0.19% (11) Native American, 12.52% (712) Asian, 0.02% (1) Pacific Islander, 1.27% (72) from other races, and 2.39% (136) from two or more races. Hispanic or Latino of any race were 5.19% (295) of the population.

Of the 2,191 households, 28.3% had children under the age of 18; 55.4% were married couples living together; 10.1% had a female householder with no husband present and 31.1% were non-families. Of all households, 27.5% were made up of individuals and 14.3% had someone living alone who was 65 years of age or older. The average household size was 2.55 and the average family size was 3.16.

21.7% of the population were under the age of 18, 7.2% from 18 to 24, 23.0% from 25 to 44, 28.2% from 45 to 64, and 19.9% who were 65 years of age or older. The median age was 43.5 years. For every 100 females, the population had 91.5 males. For every 100 females ages 18 and older there were 85.2 males.
