= Silver Lake, Warren County, New Jersey =

Populated place in Warren County, New Jersey, US

Silver Lake, New Jersey
- Census-designated place
- Location in Warren County Location in New Jersey Location in the United States
- Coordinates: 40.932374°N 74.945098°W
- Country: United States
- State: New Jersey
- County: Warren
- Township: Hope

Area
  - Total: 0.994 sq mi (2.575 km^{2})
  - Land: 0.993 sq mi (2.571 km^{2})
  - Water: 0.0015 sq mi (0.004 km^{2}) 0.16%
- Elevation: 554 ft (169 m)

Population (2010 census)
  - Total: 368
  - Density: 370.7/sq mi (143.1/km^{2})
- Time zone: UTC−05:00 (Eastern (EST))
  - Summer (DST): UTC−04:00 (EDT)
- Area code: 908
- FIPS code: 34-67650
- GNIS feature ID: 02584026

Silver Lake is an unincorporated community and census-designated place (CDP) located within Hope Township in Warren County, in the U.S. state of New Jersey, that was defined as part of the 2010 United States census. As of the 2010 Census, the CDP's population was 368.

== Geography ==
According to the United States Census Bureau, the CDP had a total area of 0.995 square miles (2.575 km^{2}), including 0.993 square miles (2.571 km^{2}) of land and 0.002 square miles (0.004 km^{2}) of water (0.16%).

== Demographics ==
Historical population
Census	Pop.	Note	%±
2010	368		—
2020	333		−9.5%

Silver Lake first appeared as a census designated place in the 2010 U.S. census.

=== 2020 census ===
Silver Lake CDP, New Jersey – Racial and ethnic composition Note: the US Census treats Hispanic/Latino as an ethnic category. This table excludes Latinos from the racial categories and assigns them to a separate category. Hispanics/Latinos may be of any race.
Race / Ethnicity (NH = Non-Hispanic)	Pop 2010	Pop 2020	% 2010	% 2020
White alone (NH)	332	298	90.22%	89.49%
Black or African American alone (NH)	1	2	0.27%	0.60%
Native American or Alaska Native alone (NH)	0	0	0.00%	0.00%
Asian alone (NH)	5	0	1.36%	0.00%
Native Hawaiian or Pacific Islander alone (NH)	0	0	0.00%	0.00%
Other race alone (NH)	0	1	0.00%	0.30%
Mixed race or Multiracial (NH)	1	10	0.27%	3.00%
Hispanic or Latino (any race)	29	22	7.88%	6.61%
Total	368	333	100.00%	100.00%

=== 2020 census ===
The 2010 United States census counted 368 people, 139 households, and 97 families in the township. The population density was 370.7 per square mile (143.1/km^{2}). There were 155 housing units at an average density of 156.1 per square mile (60.3/km^{2}). The racial makeup was 97.01% (357) White, 0.27% (1) Black or African American, 0.00% (0) Native American, 1.36% (5) Asian, 0.00% (0) Pacific Islander, 0.82% (3) from other races, and 0.54% (2) from two or more races. Hispanic or Latino of any race were 7.88% (29) of the population.

Of the 139 households, 33.8% had children under the age of 18; 54.7% were married couples living together; 9.4% had a female householder with no husband present and 30.2% were non-families. Of all households, 27.3% were made up of individuals and 9.4% had someone living alone who was 65 years of age or older. The average household size was 2.65 and the average family size was 3.22.

25.5% of the population were under the age of 18, 6.8% from 18 to 24, 19.3% from 25 to 44, 35.1% from 45 to 64, and 13.3% who were 65 years of age or older. The median age was 44.7 years. For every 100 females, the population had 97.8 males. For every 100 females ages 18 and older there were 98.6 males.
