= Monroe Manor, New Jersey =

Populated place in Middlesex County, New Jersey, US

- Census-designated place
- Location in Middlesex County Location in New Jersey Location in the United States
- Coordinates: 40°15′36″N 74°28′26″W
- Country: United States
- State: New Jersey
- County: Middlesex
- Township: Monroe

Area
  - Total: 0.29 sq mi (0.74 km^{2})
  - Land: 0.29 sq mi (0.74 km^{2})
  - Water: 0 sq mi (0.00 km^{2})
- Elevation: 112 ft (34 m)

Population (2020)
  - Total: 2,178
  - Density: 7,648.4/sq mi (2,953.07/km^{2})
- Time zone: UTC−05:00 (Eastern (EST))
  - Summer (DST): UTC−04:00 (EDT)
- ZIP Code: 08831 (Monroe Township)
- Area codes: 732/848
- FIPS code: 34-47380
- GNIS feature ID: 2806140

Monroe Manor is a census-designated place (CDP) in Monroe Township, Middlesex County, New Jersey, United States. As of the 2020 census, the first time it was listed as a CDP, it had a population of 2,178.

== Demographics ==
Monroe Manor first appeared as a census designated place in the 2020 U.S. census.

=== 2020 census ===
As of the 2020 census, Monroe Manor had a population of 2,178. The median age was 37.2 years. 35.0% of residents were under the age of 18 and 6.9% of residents were 65 years of age or older. For every 100 females there were 92.7 males, and for every 100 females age 18 and over there were 84.0 males age 18 and over.

100.0% of residents lived in urban areas, while 0.0% lived in rural areas.

There were 653 households in Monroe Manor, of which 58.3% had children under the age of 18 living in them. Of all households, 79.0% were married-couple households, 5.1% were households with a male householder and no spouse or partner present, and 13.6% were households with a female householder and no spouse or partner present. About 11.5% of all households were made up of individuals and 7.9% had someone living alone who was 65 years of age or older.

There were 666 housing units, of which 2.0% were vacant. The homeowner vacancy rate was 0.2% and the rental vacancy rate was 33.3%.

Monroe Manor CDP, New Jersey – Racial and ethnic composition Note: the US Census treats Hispanic/Latino as an ethnic category. This table excludes Latinos from the racial categories and assigns them to a separate category. Hispanics/Latinos may be of any race.
Race / Ethnicity (NH = Non-Hispanic)	Pop 2020	2020
White alone (NH)	400	18.37%
Black or African American alone (NH)	80	3.67%
Native American or Alaska Native alone (NH)	2	0.09%
Asian alone (NH)	1,594	73.19%
Native Hawaiian or Pacific Islander alone (NH)	0	0.00%
Other race alone (NH)	8	0.37%
Mixed race or Multiracial (NH)	19	0.87%
Hispanic or Latino (any race)	75	3.44%
Total	2,178	100.00%

== Geography ==
The community is in the southernmost part of Middlesex County and consists of the developments of Monroe Manor and Monroe Place. It is bordered to the south by Millstone Township in Monmouth County and to the west by the Renaissance at Monroe development. New Jersey Route 33 forms the northern border of the CDP, leading west 2.5 miles (4.0 km) to Hightstown and east 11 miles (18 km) to Freehold.

Historical population
Census	Pop.	Note	%±
2020	2,178		—
U.S. Decennial Census; 2020
