= Quinton (CDP), New Jersey =

Populated place in Salem County, New Jersey, US

Quinton, New Jersey
- Census-designated place
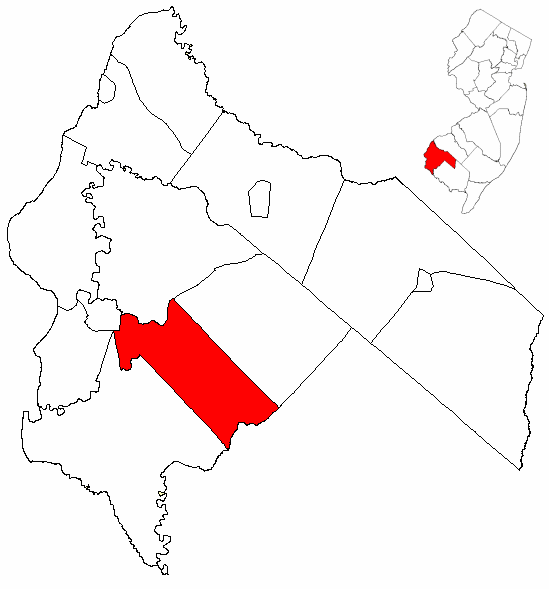
- Location of Quinton Township in Salem County highlighted in red (left). Inset map: Location of Salem County in New Jersey highlighted in red (right).

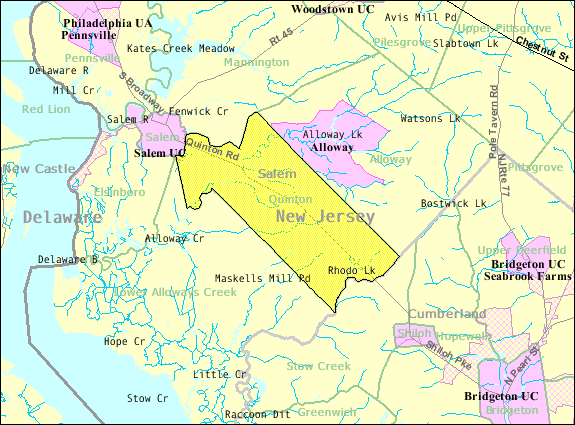
- Census Bureau map of Quinton Township, New Jersey

- Location in Salem County Location in New Jersey Location in the United States
- Coordinates: 39.547478°N 75.410915°W
- Country: United States
- State: New Jersey
- County: Salem
- Township: Quinton

Area
  - Total: 0.91 sq mi (2.35 km^{2})
  - Land: 0.88 sq mi (2.29 km^{2})
  - Water: 0.023 sq mi (0.06 km^{2}) 2.57%
- Elevation: 23 ft (7 m)

Population (2020)
  - Total: 470
  - Density: 530.8/sq mi (204.95/km^{2})
- Time zone: UTC−05:00 (Eastern (EST))
  - Summer (DST): UTC−04:00 (Eastern (EDT))
- ZIP Code: 08072
- Area code: 856
- FIPS code: 34-61440
- GNIS feature ID: 02584021

Quinton is an unincorporated community and census-designated place (CDP) located within Quinton Township, in Salem County, in the U.S. state of New Jersey. As of the 2010 United States census, the CDP's population was 1,402.

Quinton CDP and Quinton Township are not coextensive, with the CDP covering 3.7% of the 24.588 miles (39.571 km) of the township as a whole.

== Geography ==
According to the United States Census Bureau, Quinton CDP had a total area of 0.908 square miles (2.354 km^{2}), including 0.885 square miles (2.293 km^{2}) of land and 0.023 square miles (0.061 km^{2}) of water (2.57%).

== Demographics ==
Historical population
Census	Pop.	Note	%±
2010	588		—
2020	470		−20.1%
U.S. Decennial Census; 2010 2020

Quinton first appeared as a census designated place in the 2010 U.S. census.

Quinton CDP, New Jersey – Racial and ethnic composition Note: the US Census treats Hispanic/Latino as an ethnic category. This table excludes Latinos from the racial categories and assigns them to a separate category. Hispanics/Latinos may be of any race.
Race / Ethnicity (NH = Non-Hispanic)	Population		Percentage	
Race / Ethnicity (NH = Non-Hispanic)	2010	2020	2010	2020
White alone (NH)	497	342	84.52%	72.77%
Black or African American alone (NH)	41	41	6.97%	8.72%
Native American or Alaska Native alone (NH)	3	2	0.51%	0.43%
Asian alone (NH)	2	2	0.34%	0.43%
Native Hawaiian or Pacific Islander alone (NH)	0	0	0.00%	0.00%
Other race alone (NH)	0	0	0.00%	0.00%
Mixed race or Multiracial (NH)	27	50	4.59%	10.64%
Hispanic or Latino (any race)	18	33	3.06%	7.02%
Total	588	470	100.00%	100.00%

=== 2010 census ===
The 2010 United States census counted 588 people, 215 households, and 163 families in the CDP. The population density was 664.1 per square mile (256.4/km^{2}). There were 225 housing units at an average density of 254.1 per square mile (98.1/km^{2}). The racial makeup was 86.05% (506) White, 6.97% (41) Black or African American, 0.85% (5) Native American, 0.34% (2) Asian, 0.00% (0) Pacific Islander, 0.34% (2) from other races, and 5.44% (32) from two or more races. Hispanic or Latino of any race were 3.06% (18) of the population.

Of the 215 households, 36.3% had children under the age of 18; 54.0% were married couples living together; 14.4% had a female householder with no husband present and 24.2% were non-families. Of all households, 18.6% were made up of individuals and 7.0% had someone living alone who was 65 years of age or older. The average household size was 2.73 and the average family size was 3.12.

28.7% of the population were under the age of 18, 5.6% from 18 to 24, 26.5% from 25 to 44, 24.8% from 45 to 64, and 14.3% who were 65 years of age or older. The median age was 37.1 years. For every 100 females, the population had 100.0 males. For every 100 females ages 18 and older there were 94.0 males.
