= East Freehold, New Jersey =

Populated place in Monmouth County, New Jersey, US

- Census-designated place
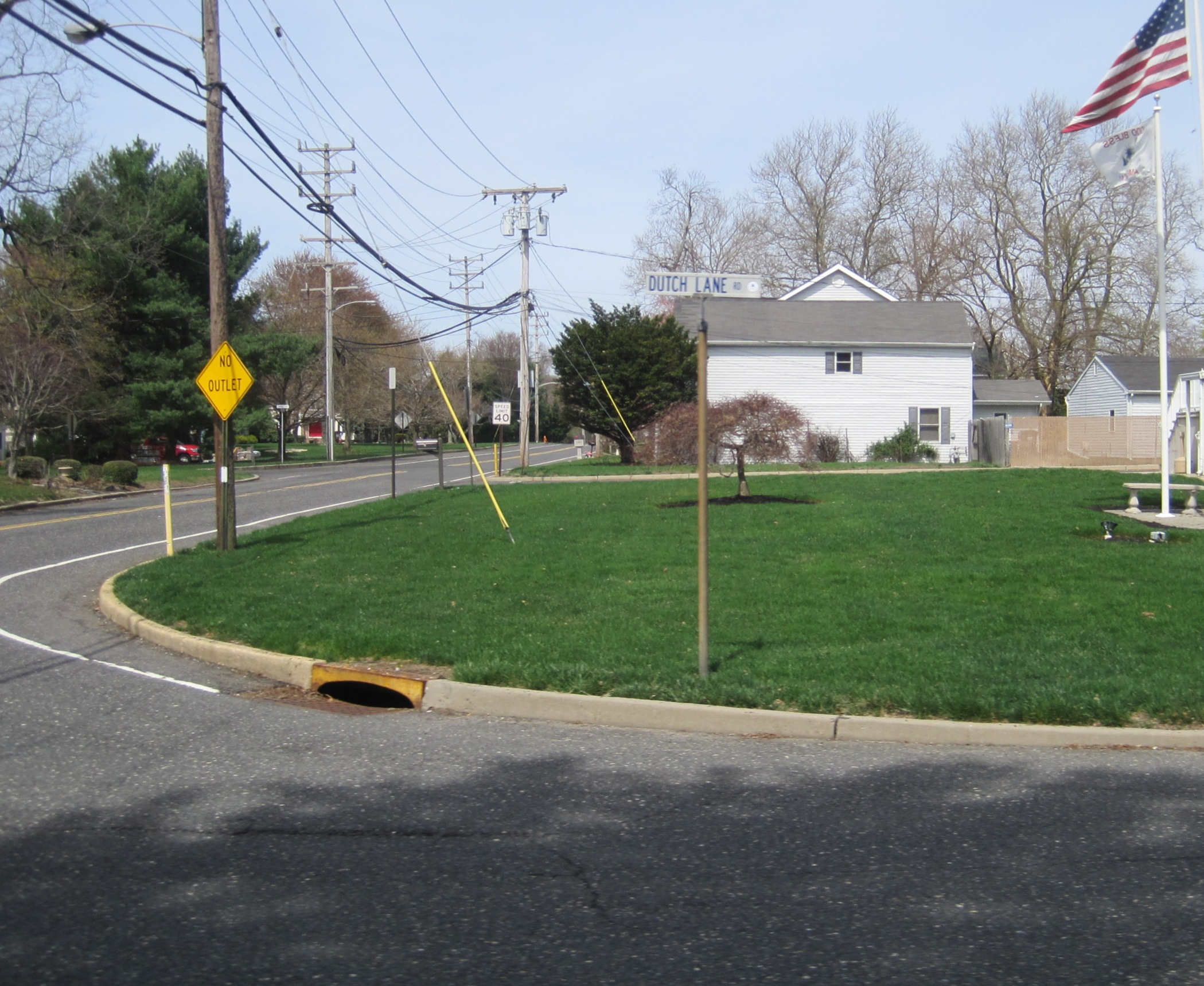
- Center of East Freehold at Dutch Lane Road and East Freehold Road

- Map of East Freehold CDP in Monmouth County. Inset: Location of Monmouth County in New Jersey.

- Location in Monmouth County Location in New Jersey Location in the United States
- Coordinates: 40.275752°N 74.241309°W
- Country: United States
- State: New Jersey
- County: Monmouth
- Township: Freehold

Area
  - Total: 2.99 sq mi (7.74 km^{2})
  - Land: 2.98 sq mi (7.72 km^{2})
  - Water: 0.0077 sq mi (0.02 km^{2}) 0.27%
- Elevation: 160 ft (50 m)

Population (2020)
  - Total: 4,987
  - Density: 1,673.4/sq mi (646.11/km^{2})
- Time zone: UTC−05:00 (Eastern (EST))
  - Summer (DST): UTC−04:00 (Eastern (EDT))
- ZIP Code: 07728 (Freehold)
- Area codes: 732/848
- FIPS code: 34-19150
- GNIS feature ID: 02389430

East Freehold is an unincorporated community and census-designated place (CDP) in Freehold Township, Monmouth County, New Jersey, United States. As of the 2020 census, the CDP population was 4,987.

== Geography ==
The community is in central Monmouth County and occupies the northeast corner of Freehold Township. It is bordered to the north by Marlboro Township, to the east by Colts Neck Township, and to the southwest by Freehold Borough. The New Jersey Route 18 freeway runs along the northeast border of the community, with access from Exit 22 (CR 537, Colts Neck Road).

According to the U.S. Census Bureau, the East Freehold CDP has an area of 2.99 square miles (7.74 km^{2}), of which 0.01 square miles (0.03 km^{2}), or 0.27%, are water. Most of the community drains east to Yellow Brook, a tributary of the Swimming River and thence the Navesink River estuary. The southwest corner of East Freehold drains to Debois Creek, a tributary of the Manasquan River.

== Demographics ==
Historical population
Census	Pop.	Note	%±
1980	2,990		—
1990	3,842		28.5%
2000	4,936		28.5%
2010	4,894		−0.9%
2020	4,987		1.9%
Population sources: 1950 1960 1970; 1980 1990 2000; 2010 2020

East Freehold first appeared as a census designated place in the 1980 U.S. census.

=== Racial and ethnic composition ===
East Freehold CDP, New Jersey – Racial and ethnic composition Note: the US Census treats Hispanic/Latino as an ethnic category. This table excludes Latinos from the racial categories and assigns them to a separate category. Hispanics/Latinos may be of any race.
Race / Ethnicity (NH = Non-Hispanic)	Pop 2000	Pop 2010	Pop 2020	% 2000	% 2010	% 2020
White alone (NH)	4,140	3,990	3,637	83.87%	81.53%	72.93%
Black or African American alone (NH)	181	124	186	3.67%	2.53%	3.73%
Native American or Alaska Native alone (NH)	2	1	1	0.04%	0.02%	0.02%
Asian alone (NH)	357	429	497	7.23%	8.77%	9.97%
Native Hawaiian or Pacific Islander alone (NH)	1	0	1	0.02%	0.00%	0.02%
Other race alone (NH)	7	14	23	0.14%	0.29%	0.46%
Mixed race or Multiracial (NH)	58	69	157	1.18%	1.41%	3.15%
Hispanic or Latino (any race)	190	267	485	3.85%	5.46%	9.73%
Total	4,936	4,894	4,987	100.00%	100.00%	100.00%

=== 2020 census ===
As of the 2020 census, East Freehold had a population of 4,987. The median age was 42.4 years. 23.0% of residents were under the age of 18 and 14.3% of residents were 65 years of age or older. For every 100 females there were 100.5 males, and for every 100 females age 18 and over there were 97.4 males age 18 and over.

100.0% of residents lived in urban areas, while 0.0% lived in rural areas.

There were 1,648 households in East Freehold, of which 39.2% had children under the age of 18 living in them. Of all households, 67.7% were married-couple households, 10.1% were households with a male householder and no spouse or partner present, and 18.7% were households with a female householder and no spouse or partner present. About 14.7% of all households were made up of individuals and 5.6% had someone living alone who was 65 years of age or older.

There were 1,698 housing units, of which 2.9% were vacant. The homeowner vacancy rate was 0.3% and the rental vacancy rate was 7.6%.

=== 2010 census ===
The 2010 United States census counted 4,894 people, 1,637 households, and 1,365 families in the CDP. The population density was 1,650.3 people per square mile (637.2 people/km^{2}). There were 1,685 housing units at an average density of 568.2 units per square mile (219.4 units/km^{2}). The racial makeup was 85.78% (4,198) White, 2.64% (129) Black or African American, 0.04% (2) Native American, 8.83% (432) Asian, 0.00% (0) Pacific Islander, 1.19% (58) from other races, and 1.53% (75) from two or more races. Hispanic or Latino of any race were 5.46% (267) of the population.

Of the 1,637 households, 43.5% had children under the age of 18; 73.0% were married couples living together; 7.9% had a female householder with no husband present and 16.6% were non-families. Of all households, 13.9% were made up of individuals and 4.5% had someone living alone who was 65 years of age or older. The average household size was 2.99 and the average family size was 3.32.

27.4% of the population were under the age of 18, 7.2% from 18 to 24, 21.6% from 25 to 44, 33.4% from 45 to 64, and 10.4% who were 65 years of age or older. The median age was 41.4 years. For every 100 females, the population had 96.9 males. For every 100 females ages 18 and older there were 96.2 males.

=== 2000 census ===
As of the 2000 United States census there were 4,936 people, 1,643 households, and 1,396 families living in the CDP. The population density was 646.0 people/km^{2} (1,673 people/mi^{2}). There were 1,664 housing units at an average density of 217.8 units/km^{2} (564 units/mi^{2}). The racial makeup of the CDP was 86.71% White, 3.69% African American, 0.04% Native American, 7.27% Asian, 0.02% Pacific Islander, 0.91% from other races, and 1.36% from two or more races. Hispanic or Latino of any race were 3.85% of the population.

There were 1,643 households, out of which 46.6% had children under the age of 18 living with them, 77.0% were married couples living together, 6.0% had a female householder with no husband present, and 15.0% were non-families. 12.4% of all households were made up of individuals, and 3.2% had someone living alone who was 65 years of age or older. The average household size was 3.00 and the average family size was 3.30.

In the CDP the population was spread out, with 29.9% under the age of 18, 5.3% from 18 to 24, 32.1% from 25 to 44, 25.6% from 45 to 64, and 7.2% who were 65 years of age or older. The median age was 37 years. For every 100 females, there were 95.9 males. For every 100 females age 18 and over, there were 94.3 males.

The median income for a household in the CDP was $93,548, and the median income for a family was $102,756. Males had a median income of $71,215 versus $38,060 for females. The per capita income for the CDP was $35,119. About 1.7% of families and 2.6% of the population were below the poverty line, including 3.5% of those under age 18 and 7.0% of those age 65 or over.
