= Grenloch, New Jersey =

Populated place in Gloucester County, New Jersey, US

- Census-designated place
- Location in Gloucester County Location in New Jersey Location in the United States
- Coordinates: 39°47′08″N 75°03′21″W
- Country: United States
- State: New Jersey
- County: Gloucester
- Township: Washington

Area
  - Total: 0.80 sq mi (2.06 km^{2})
  - Land: 0.76 sq mi (1.97 km^{2})
  - Water: 0.035 sq mi (0.09 km^{2})
- Elevation: 79 ft (24 m)

Population (2020)
  - Total: 863
  - Density: 1,136.8/sq mi (438.91/km^{2})
- Time zone: UTC−05:00 (Eastern (EST))
  - Summer (DST): UTC−04:00 (EDT)
- ZIP Code: 08032
- Area code: 856
- FIPS code: 34-28380
- GNIS feature ID: 876822

Grenloch is an unincorporated community and census-designated place (CDP) located within Washington Township, in Gloucester County, in the U.S. state of New Jersey. As of the 2020 census, Grenloch had a population of 863. Grenloch is located along New Jersey Route 168 10.25 miles (16.50 km) south-southeast of Camden. Grenloch has a post office with ZIP Code 08032.

Grenloch is Scottish for "green lake".

== Demographics ==
Historical population
Census	Pop.	Note	%±
2020	863		—
U.S. Decennial Census; 2020

Grenloch was first listed as a census designated place in the 2020 U.S. census.

Grenloch CDP, New Jersey – Racial and ethnic composition Note: the US Census treats Hispanic/Latino as an ethnic category. This table excludes Latinos from the racial categories and assigns them to a separate category. Hispanics/Latinos may be of any race.
Race / Ethnicity (NH = Non-Hispanic)	Pop 2020	2020
White alone (NH)	613	71.03%
Black or African American alone (NH)	83	9.62%
Native American or Alaska Native alone (NH)	0	0.00%
Asian alone (NH)	56	6.49%
Native Hawaiian or Pacific Islander alone (NH)	0	0.00%
Other race alone (NH)	3	0.35%
Mixed race or Multiracial (NH)	43	4.98%
Hispanic or Latino (any race)	65	7.53%
Total	863	100.00%

As of 2020, the area had a population of 863.
