= Society Hill, Middlesex County, New Jersey =

Populated place in Middlesex County, New Jersey, US

Society Hill, New Jersey
- Unincorporated community
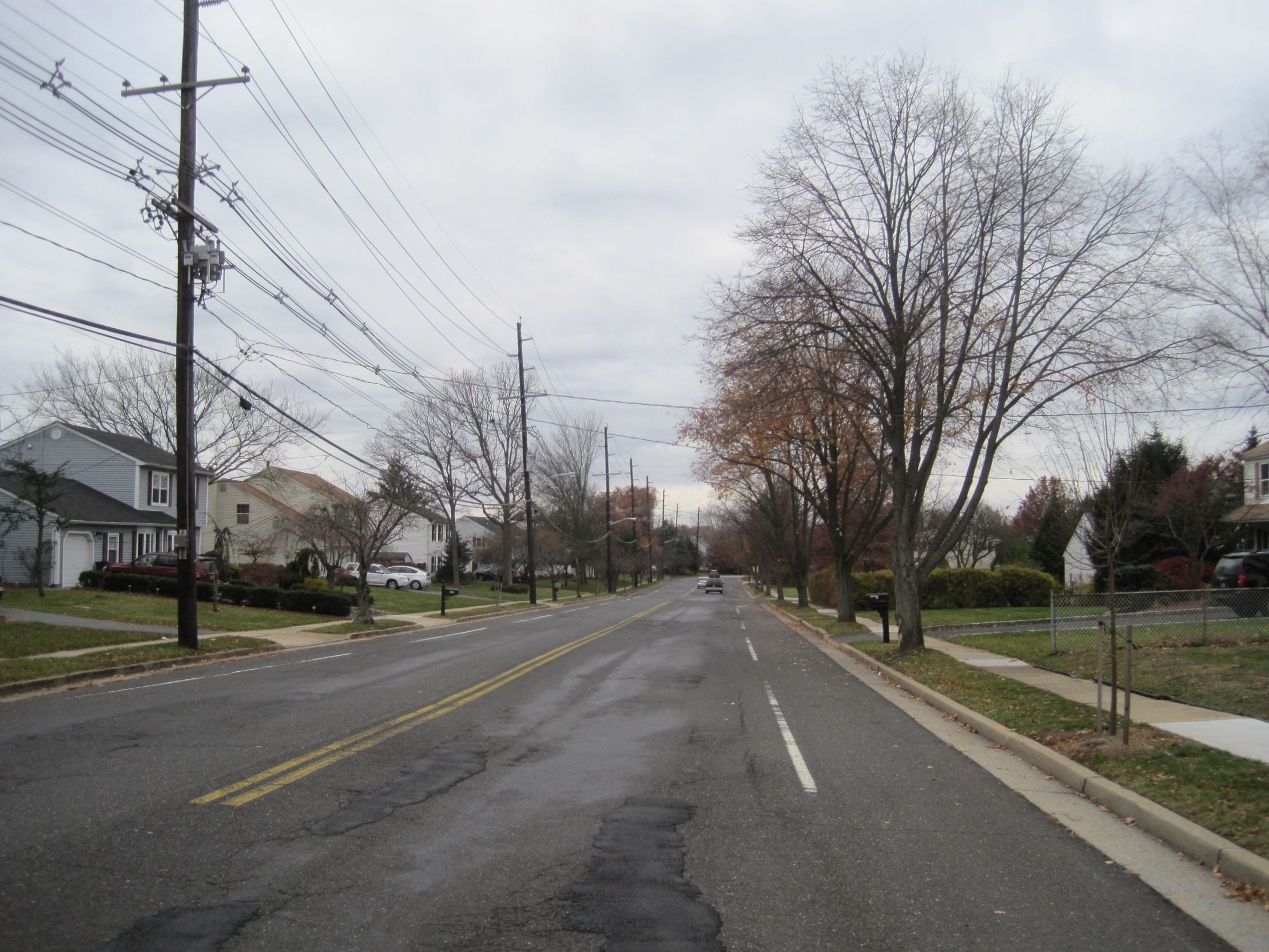
- Society Hill from Morris Avenue

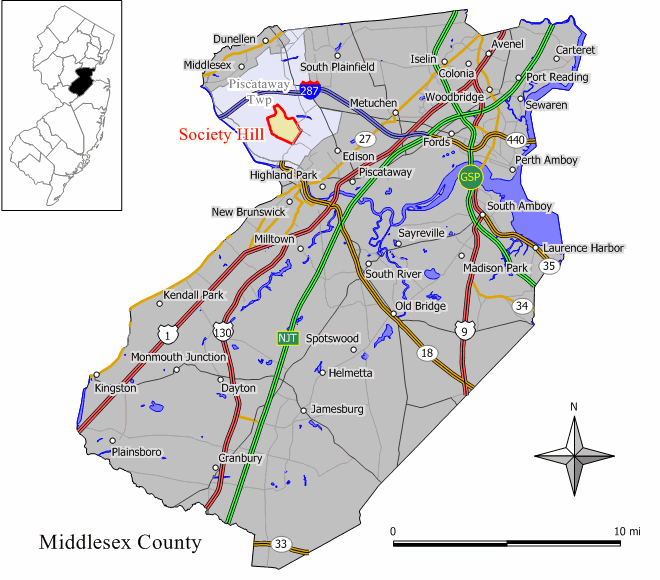
- 2010 map of Society Hill highlighted within Middlesex County. Inset: Location of Middlesex County in New Jersey.

- Location in Middlesex County Location in New Jersey Location in the United States
- Coordinates: 40.534508°N 74.45608°W
- Country: United States
- State: New Jersey
- County: Middlesex
- Township: Piscataway

Area
  - Total: 1.388 sq mi (3.594 km^{2})
  - Land: 1.387 sq mi (3.593 km^{2})
  - Water: 0.00039 sq mi (0.001 km^{2}) 0.03%
- Elevation: 95 ft (29 m)

Population (2010 census)
  - Total: 3,829
  - Density: 2,760.4/sq mi (1,065.8/km^{2})
- Time zone: UTC−05:00 (Eastern (EST))
  - Summer (DST): UTC−04:00 (Eastern (EDT))
- Area code: 732
- FIPS code: 34-68304
- GNIS feature ID: 02390310

Society Hill is an unincorporated community and former census-designated place (CDP) in Piscataway Township, Middlesex County, New Jersey, United States. As of the 2010 United States census, the CDP's population was 3,829. The area was not listed as a CDP for the 2020 census.

== Geography ==
According to the U.S. Census Bureau, in 2010 the CDP had a total area of 1.387 square miles (3.59 km^{2}), including 1.387 square miles (3.59 km^{2}) of land and less than 0.001 square miles (0.0026 km^{2}) of water (0.03%). The community is located near the center of the township north of New Jersey Route 18 and Rutgers University's Busch Campus. The area mainly consists of single-family homes, an apartment complex, and a cemetery.

== Demographics ==
Historical population
| Census | Pop. | Note | %± |
|---|---|---|---|
| 1990 | 3,577 | | — |
| 2000 | 3,804 | | 6.3% |
| 2010 | 3,829 | | 0.7% |
Population sources: 1950 1960 1970; 1980 1990 2000; 2010; Not listed as a CDP in 2020.

Society Hill first appeared as a census designated place in the 1990 U.S. census. It was deleted as a CDP for the 2020 U.S. census.

Society Hill CDP, New Jersey – Racial and ethnic composition Note: the US Census treats Hispanic/Latino as an ethnic category. This table excludes Latinos from the racial categories and assigns them to a separate category. Hispanics/Latinos may be of any race.
| Race / Ethnicity (NH = Non-Hispanic) | Pop 2000 | Pop 2010 | % 2000 | % 2010 |
|---|---|---|---|---|
| White alone (NH) | 1,622 | 1,194 | 42.64% | 31.18% |
| Black or African American alone (NH) | 598 | 570 | 15.72% | 14.89% |
| Native American or Alaska Native alone (NH) | 6 | 4 | 0.16% | 0.10% |
| Asian alone (NH) | 1,290 | 1,697 | 33.91% | 44.32% |
| Native Hawaiian or Pacific Islander alone (NH) | 0 | 0 | 0.00% | 0.00% |
| Other race alone (NH) | 1 | 3 | 0.03% | 0.08% |
| Mixed race or Multiracial (NH) | 95 | 88 | 2.50% | 2.30% |
| Hispanic or Latino (any race) | 192 | 273 | 5.05% | 7.13% |
| Total | 3,804 | 3,829 | 100.00% | 100.00% |

=== Census 2010 ===
The 2010 United States census counted 3,829 people, 1,226 households, and 905 families in the CDP. The population density was 2,760.4 people per square mile (1,065.8 people/km^{2}). There were 1,264 housing units at an average density of 911.2 units per square mile (351.8 units/km^{2}). The racial makeup was 34.79% (1,332) White, 15.57% (596) Black or African American, 0.13% (5) Native American, 44.63% (1,709) Asian, 0.00% (0) Pacific Islander, 2.17% (83) from other races, and 2.72% (104) from two or more races. Hispanic or Latino of any race were 7.13% (273) of the population.

Of the 1,226 households, 32.8% had children under the age of 18; 58.1% were married couples living together; 12.2% had a female householder with no husband present and 26.2% were non-families. Of all households, 16.6% were made up of individuals and 2.9% had someone living alone who was 65 years of age or older. The average household size was 2.85 and the average family size was 3.26.

19.6% of the population were under the age of 18, 18.9% from 18 to 24, 26.8% from 25 to 44, 26.2% from 45 to 64, and 8.5% who were 65 years of age or older. The median age was 33.5 years. For every 100 females, the population had 90.2 males. For every 100 females ages 18 and older there were 87.3 males.

=== Census 2000 ===
As of the 2000 United States census there were 3,804 people, 1,248 households, and 913 families living in the CDP. The population density was 1,072.1 people/km^{2} (2,777 people/mi^{2}). There were 1,269 housing units at an average density of 357.6 units/km^{2} (926 units/mi^{2}). The racial makeup of the CDP was 45.45% White, 15.96% African American, 0.24% Native American, 34.07% Asian, 1.42% from other races, and 2.87% from two or more races. Hispanic or Latino of any race were 5.05% of the population.

There were 1,248 households, out of which 38.5% had children under the age of 18 living with them, 59.7% were married couples living together, 10.4% had a female householder with no husband present, and 26.8% were non-families. 16.7% of all households were made up of individuals, and 2.6% had someone living alone who was 65 years of age or older. The average household size was 2.90 and the average family size was 3.34.

In the CDP the population was spread out, with 22.9% under the age of 18, 14.0% from 18 to 24, 33.8% from 25 to 44, 22.3% from 45 to 64, and 7.0% who were 65 years of age or older. The median age was 33 years. For every 100 females, there were 97.7 males. For every 100 females age 18 and over, there were 92.1 males.

The median income for a household in the CDP was $81,956, and the median income for a family was $89,411. Males had a median income of $60,000 versus $39,224 for females. The per capita income for the CDP was $31,143. About 1.8% of families and 4.3% of the population were below the poverty line, including 1.7% of those under age 18 and 2.3% of those age 65 or over.
