= Barclay Farm House =

Historic house in New Jersey, United States

- U.S. National Register of Historic Places
- New Jersey Register of Historic Places
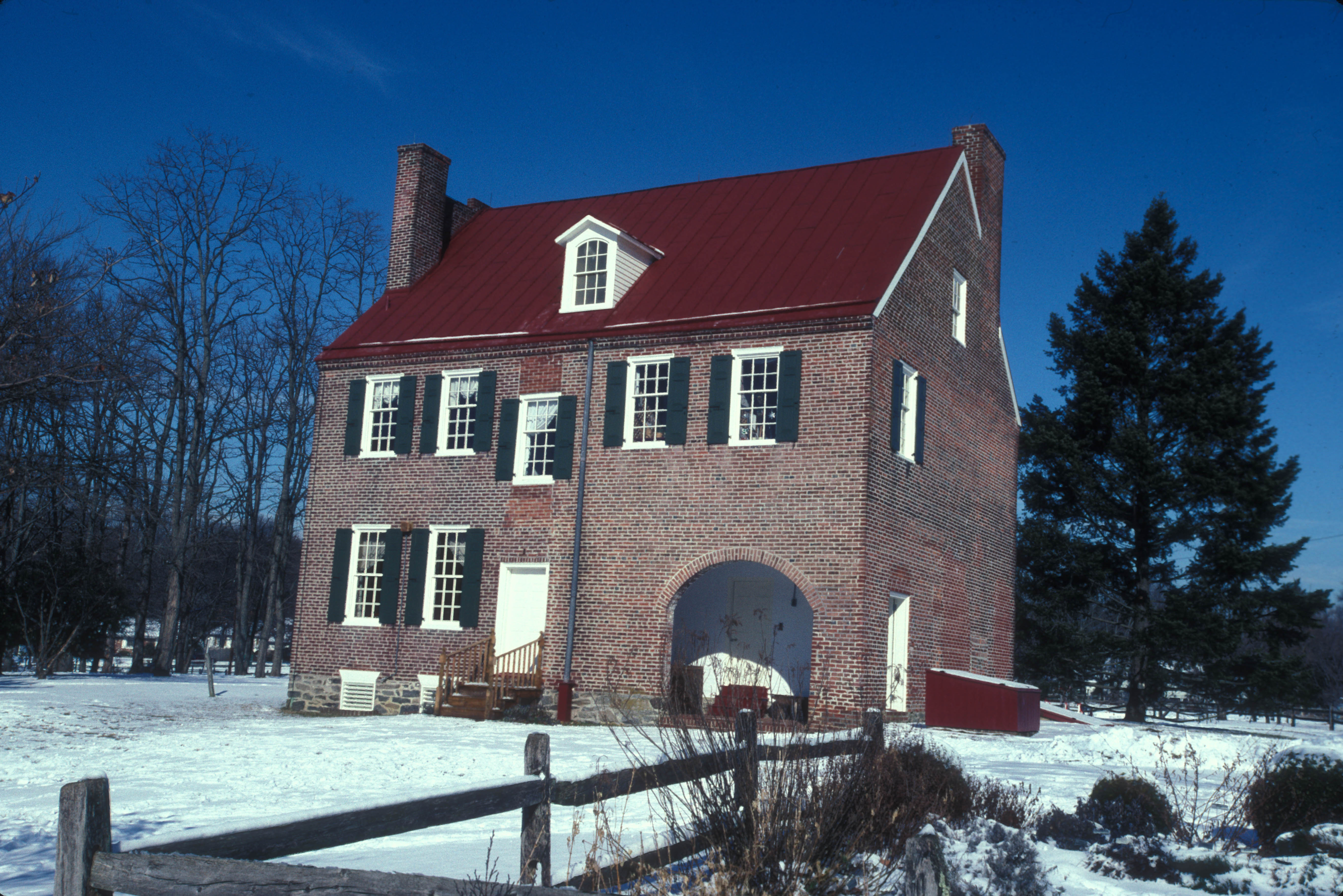

- Location within Camden County, New Jersey Location within New Jersey Location within the United States
- Location: 209 Barclay Lane, Cherry Hill, New Jersey
- Coordinates: 39°54′10″N 74°59′46″W
- Built: 1816
- Architectural style: Federal
- NRHP reference No.: 78001753
- NJRHP No.: 939

Significant dates
- Added to NRHP: January 26, 1978
- Designated NJRHP: June 20, 1976

The Barclay Farm House, also known as the Barclay Farmstead, is located at 209 Barclay Lane in Cherry Hill, Camden County, in the U.S. state of New Jersey. The historic Federal house was added to the National Register of Historic Places on January 26, 1978, for its significance in architecture.

== History ==
Constructed in 1816, the brick farmhouse is owned and operated by Cherry Hill as an early 19th-century house with living history programs.

The Barclay Farm home is open for tours throughout the year, and is the site of special events in the summer months, such as weekly outdoor concerts. At Christmas time, the home is decorated and hosts winter events, including an annual craft fair.

The Barclay Farmstead Museum is open to the public on Wednesdays from 12:00 to 4:00 p.m. and the first Sunday of each month from 1:00 to 4:00 p.m. (March to November). Calling is recommended before a visit.

The immediate area surrounding the farm house has marked light hiking trails, a playground and a number of vegetable gardens, cared for by area residents who rent space during the summer to grow produce.

== See also ==
- National Register of Historic Places listings in Camden County, New Jersey
