= Parsippany–Troy Hills, New Jersey =

Township in Morris County, New Jersey, US

- Township
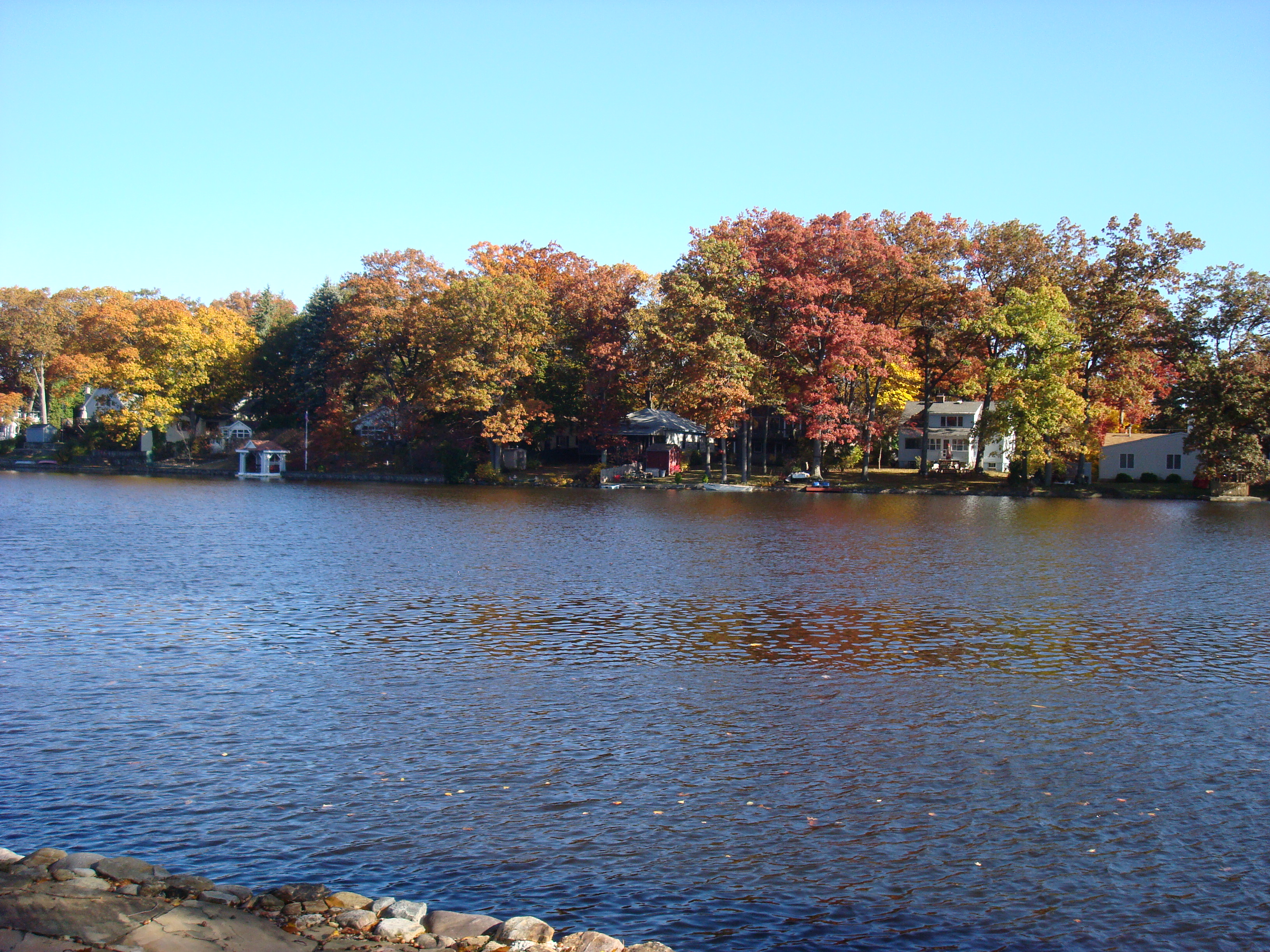
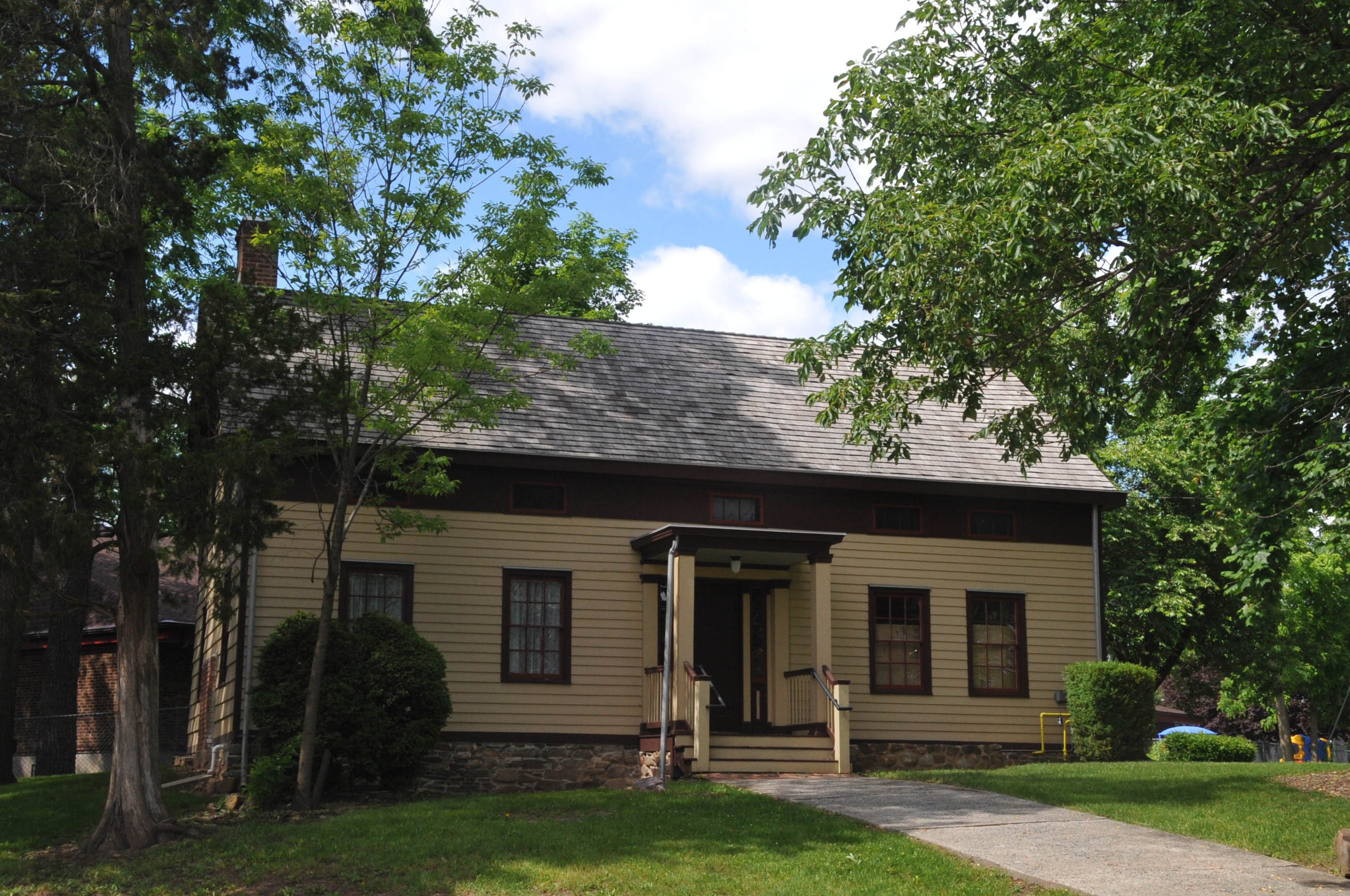
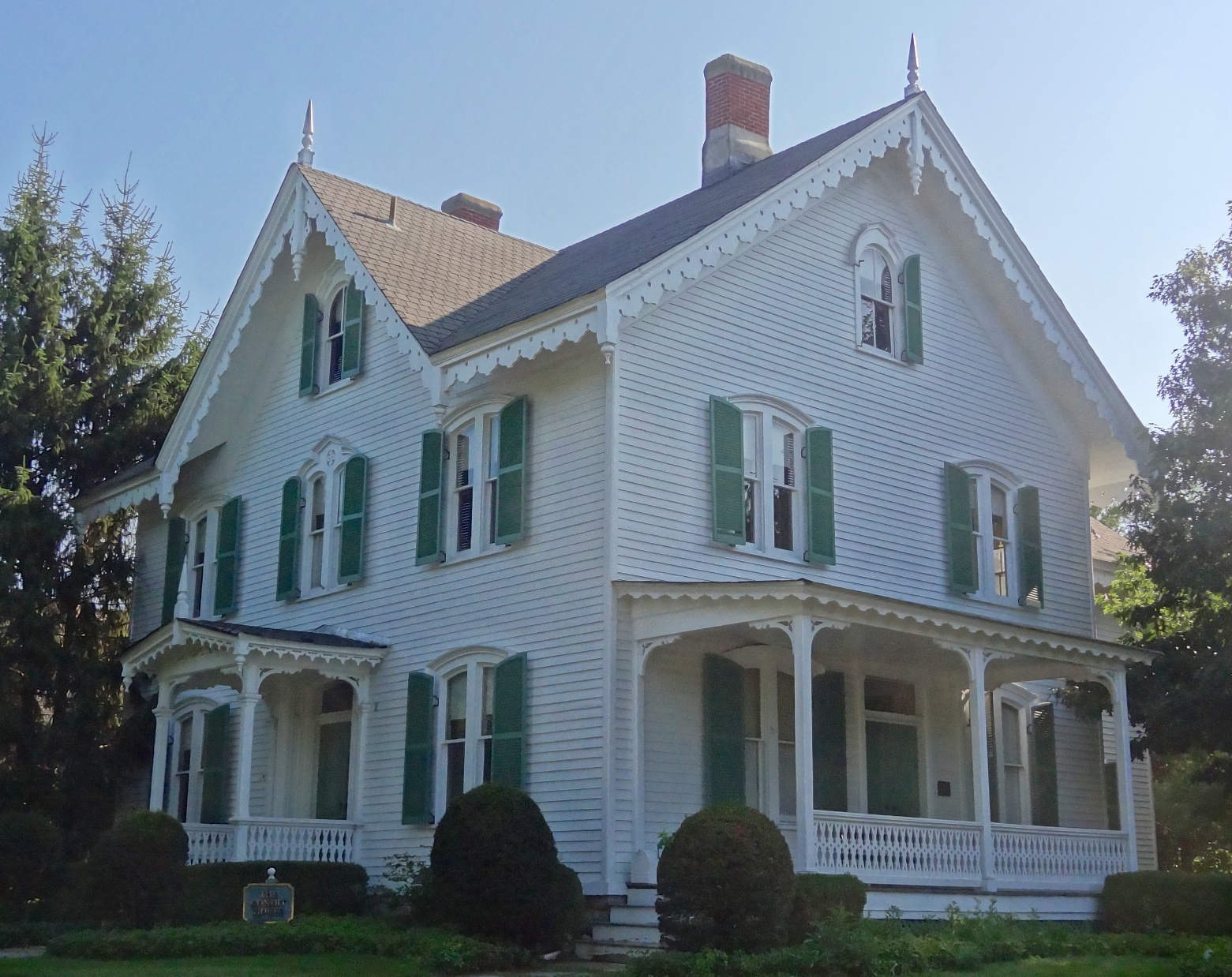
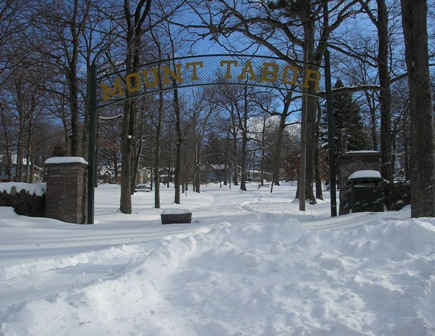
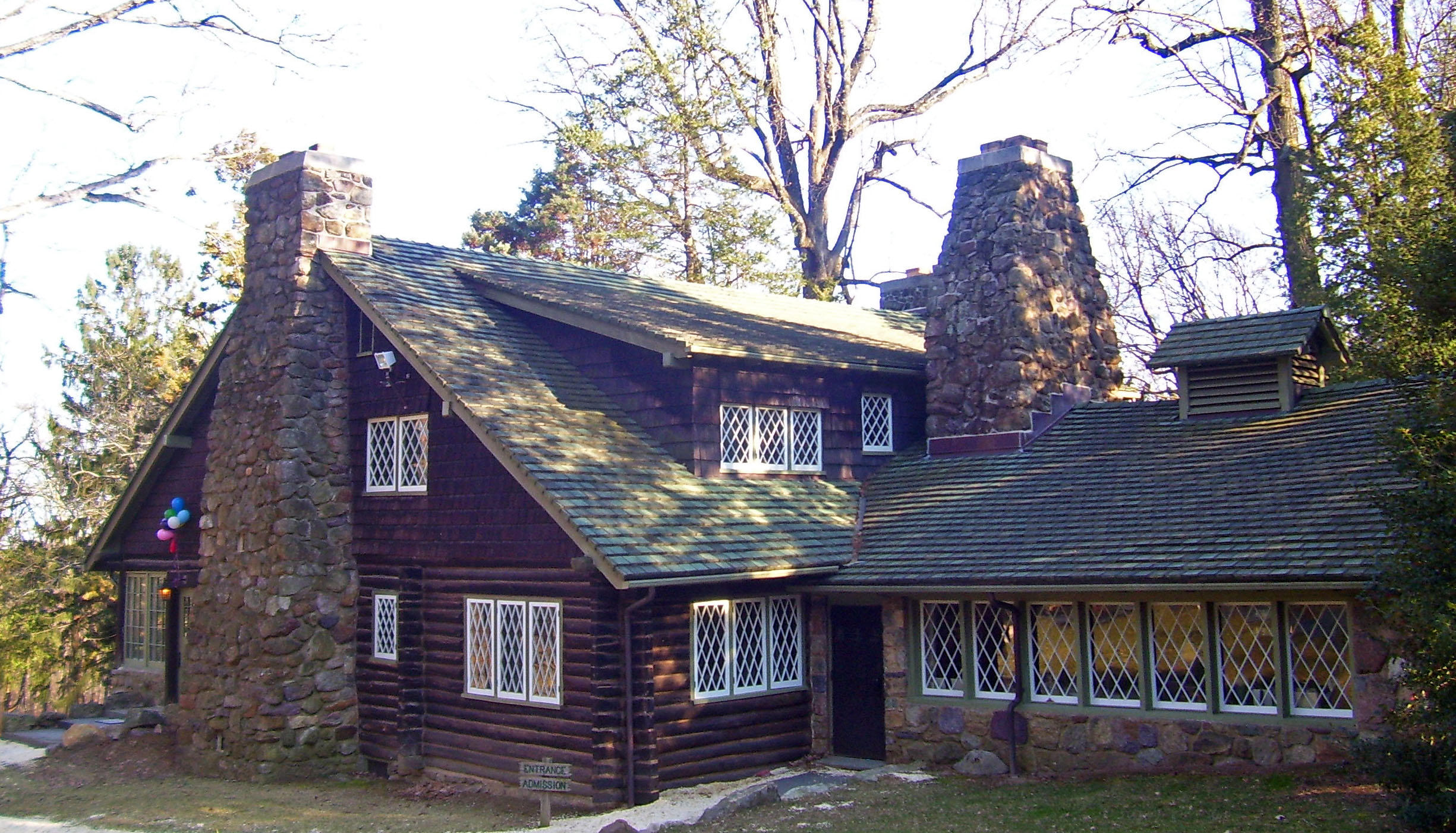
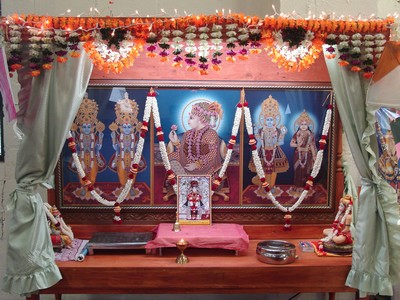
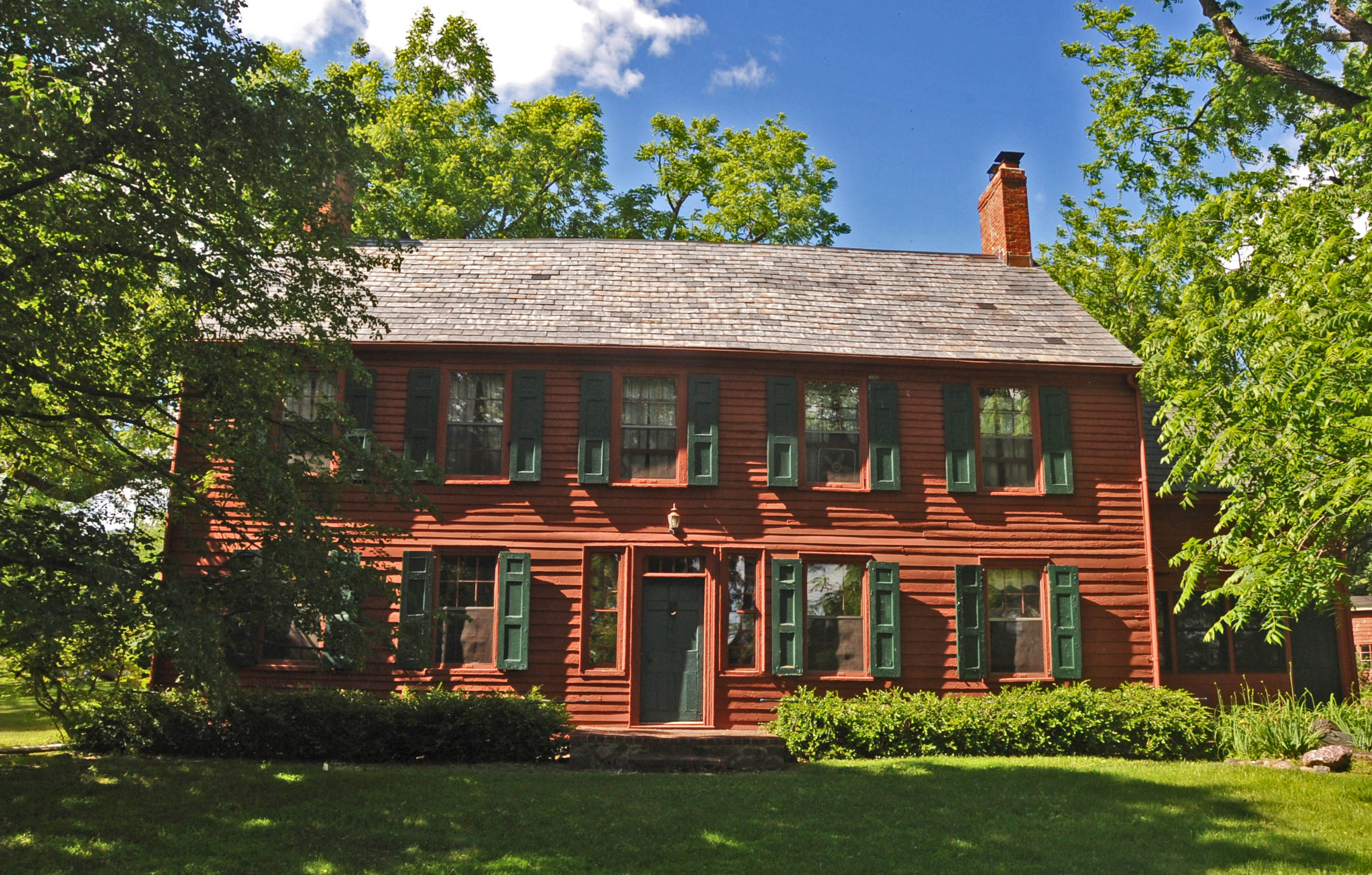
- Rainbow Lake Bowlsby–Degelleke House Stephen Condit House Mount Tabor Craftsman Farms Swaminarayan Hindu temple Benjamin Howell Homestead

- Seal
- Interactive map of Parsippany–Troy Hills, New Jersey
- Location in Morris County Location in New Jersey Location in the United States
- Coordinates: 40.859636°N 74.423348°W
- Country: United States
- State: New Jersey
- County: Morris
- Incorporated: May 9, 1928

Government
  - Type: Faulkner Act (mayor–council)
  - Body: Township Council
  - Mayor: Pulkit Desai (D, term ends December 31, 2029)
  - Administrator: Khaled Madin
  - Municipal clerk: Khaled Madin

Area
  - Total: 25.35 sq mi (65.65 km^{2})
  - Land: 23.63 sq mi (61.20 km^{2})
  - Water: 1.72 sq mi (4.45 km^{2}) 6.79%
  - Rank: 105th of 565 in state 6th of 39 in county
- Elevation: 302 ft (92 m)

Population (2020)
  - Total: 56,162
  - Estimate (2023): 56,289
  - Rank: 30th of 565 in state 1st of 39 in county
  - Density: 2,376.5/sq mi (917.6/km^{2})
  - Rank: 261st of 565 in state 13th of 39 in county
- Time zone: UTC−05:00 (Eastern (EST))
  - Summer (DST): UTC−04:00 (Eastern (EDT))
- ZIP Code: 07054
- Area code: 973
- FIPS code: 3402756460
- GNIS feature ID: 0882206
- Website: www.parsippany.net

Parsippany–Troy Hills, commonly known as Parsippany (/pɑːrˈsɪpəni/ par-SIP-ə-nee), is a township in Morris County, in the northern portion of the U.S. state of New Jersey. As of the 2020 census, the township's population was 56,162. An increase of 2,924 (+5.5%) from the 2010 census count of 53,238, which in turn had reflected an increase of 2,589 (+5.1%) from the 50,649 counted at the 2000 census.

The name Parsippany comes from the Lenape Native American sub-tribe, which comes from the word parsipanong, which means "the place where the river winds through the valley." Parsippany–Troy Hills is the most populous municipality in Morris County. The name Troy Hills was changed from Troy to avoid confusion of mail being sent erroneously to Troy, New York.

Parsippany–Troy Hills was incorporated as a township by an act of the New Jersey Legislature on March 12, 1928, from portions of Hanover Township, based on the results of a referendum held on May 9, 1928, that split off both East Hanover Township and Parsippany–Troy Hills from Hanover Township.

Since 2006, Parsippany–Troy Hills appeared eight times on Money magazine's list of "Best Places to Live in the United States", ranking 17th-best in 2006, 13th-best in 2008, 15th-best in 2012, 17th-best in 2014, fifth-best in 2016, 33rd-best in 2017, 26th-best in 2018, and 15th-best in 2022.

== History ==
After the Wisconsin Glacier melted around 13,000 BCE, half of Parsippany was filled with water, as this was Lake Passaic. Around the area, grasses grew, as the area was tundra, and then turned into a taiga/boreal forest as the area warmed.

=== Native Americans ===
Paleo-Indians moved in small groups into the area around 12,500 years ago, attracted by the diversity of plant and animal life.

Native Americans relocated to the area several thousand years ago, dwelling in the highlands and along the Rockaway River and the Whippany River, where they hunted and fished for the various game that lived in the area and migrated through the area in autumn. Paintings in a rock cave were found in the late 1970s in western Parsippany in the highlands.

=== Dutch settlement ===
From 1611 to 1614, the Netherlands established the colony of New Netherland, which claimed territory between the 40th and 45th parallels north, a zone that included all of North Jersey. Native Americans traded furs and food with the Dutch for various goods, including metal pots, knives, guns, axes, and blankets. Trading with the Native Americans occurred until 1643, when a series of wars broke out between them. There were hostile relations between the Dutch and Native Americans between 1643 and 1660, which prevented the colonization by the Dutch of present-day Morris County.

On August 27, 1664, three English ships approached Fort Amsterdam, and surrendered the fort to the English. The English took control of New Netherland, and Morris County was included in the colonial-era Province of New York.

Relations with the Native Americans improved briefly after New Jersey's independent establishment. In a war between the Dutch and British ten years later. However, the Dutch retook control of New Amsterdam. A year later, it returned to the British. Relations with the Native Americans and English improved for a while. Settlers from England began moving to the area around 1700. The Parsippany area had flat land and fertile soil, and a fresh water supply, which created a suitable location for successful farming.

=== Slavery in Parsippany ===
From the 1730s until the beginning of the 19th century, present-day Parsippany was known as Lake Hiawatha, and included a 2,000-acre (810 ha) slave plantation. The central street of Lake Hiawatha, Beverwyck Road, references the name of a Dutch slave owner and property manager, Lucas Von Beverhoudt.

Generations of African slaves were forced to labor on the Beverwyck property, including Phebe Ann Jacobs. Born enslaved in 1785 on the Beverwyck plantation, she later achieved freedom in Maine, laundering clothes for students of Bowdoin College. Her biography, Narrative of Phebe Ann Jacobs, published posthumously in 1850, is thought to have been a source of inspiration to Harriet Beecher Stowe, who authored the anti-slavery novel Uncle Tom's Cabin.

A 1768 newspaper advertisement for the property mentions a "Negro House," which was constructed to house over 20 slaves, including a blacksmith, a shoemaker, and a mason. A 1780 newspaper notice includes a description to aid in re-capturing "Jack," a slave who had escaped; this notice can be found at the Morristown National Historical Park.

Guests at the estate included George Washington, Nathaniel Greene, and Marquis de Lafayette.

== Geography ==
According to the United States Census Bureau, the township had a total area of 25.35 square miles (65.65 km^{2}), including 23.63 square miles (61.20 km^{2}) of land and 1.72 square miles (4.45 km^{2}) of water (6.79%).

Parsippany-Troy Hills is characterized as a suburban community with numerous residential neighborhoods and areas of commercial development. Approximately one-third of the townships is categorized as open space.

Unincorporated communities, localities and place names located partially or completely within the township include Greystone Park, Lake Hiawatha, Intervale, Lake Parsippany, Mount Tabor (also known as "Tabor"), Parsippany, Powder Mill, Rainbow Lakes, Rockaway Neck, and Troy Hills.

Lake Hiawatha and Mount Tabor are neighborhoods with their own ZIP codes. In 2000, 55% of Parsippany residents had a 07054 ZIP code. In 2011, Parsippany residents could live in one of 12 ZIP codes. Until 2000, there was a 13th ZIP code within Parsippany–Troy Hills, which was eliminated with changes at the Greystone Park Psychiatric Hospital.

Parsippany borders the municipalities of Boonton, Denville Township, East Hanover Township, Hanover Township, Montville, Morris Plains, Morris Township, Mountain Lakes and Randolph.

=== Climate ===
The township has a humid continental climate, with cold winters and very warm-to-hot summers. It is usually cooler than Manhattan at night and in the early morning. The record low temperature is −21 °F (−29 °C), and the record high is 104 °F (40 °C).

Climate data for Parsippany–Troy Hills (Boonton 1 SE), New Jersey (1991–2020 normals, extremes 1893–present)
Month	Jan	Feb	Mar	Apr	May	Jun	Jul	Aug	Sep	Oct	Nov	Dec	Year
Record high °F (°C)	71 (22)	75 (24)	83 (28)	93 (34)	98 (37)	99 (37)	102 (39)	103 (39)	104 (40)	90 (32)	80 (27)	77 (25)	104 (40)
Mean daily maximum °F (°C)	37.6 (3.1)	40.0 (4.4)	48.4 (9.1)	61.1 (16.2)	71.0 (21.7)	80.7 (27.1)	85.4 (29.7)	83.6 (28.7)	76.5 (24.7)	64.1 (17.8)	52.6 (11.4)	42.4 (5.8)	62.0 (16.7)
Daily mean °F (°C)	29.1 (−1.6)	30.9 (−0.6)	38.5 (3.6)	50.1 (10.1)	60.1 (15.6)	69.7 (20.9)	74.7 (23.7)	72.8 (22.7)	65.5 (18.6)	53.2 (11.8)	42.8 (6.0)	34.3 (1.3)	51.8 (11.0)
Mean daily minimum °F (°C)	20.6 (−6.3)	21.8 (−5.7)	28.7 (−1.8)	39.1 (3.9)	49.3 (9.6)	58.8 (14.9)	64.0 (17.8)	62.1 (16.7)	54.4 (12.4)	42.4 (5.8)	33.1 (0.6)	26.2 (−3.2)	41.7 (5.4)
Record low °F (°C)	−15 (−26)	−20 (−29)	−3 (−19)	8 (−13)	26 (−3)	32 (0)	42 (6)	36 (2)	29 (−2)	16 (−9)	6 (−14)	−21 (−29)	−21 (−29)
Average precipitation inches (mm)	3.73 (95)	2.79 (71)	4.16 (106)	3.63 (92)	3.95 (100)	4.91 (125)	4.70 (119)	3.67 (93)	4.68 (119)	4.54 (115)	4.06 (103)	4.36 (111)	49.18 (1,249)
Average precipitation days (≥ 0.01 in)	10.5	10.0	11.0	12.2	13.4	12.1	10.9	10.2	9.2	11.2	8.1	12.1	130.9
Source: NOAA

=== Geology ===
Parsippany–Troy Hills lies in the Newark Piedmont Basin. Around 500 million years ago, a chain of volcanic islands crashed into proto North America, riding over the North American Plate and creating the New Jersey Highlands, which start in the western portion of the township. This strike also created land formations in the rest of eastern New Jersey. Around 450 million years ago, a small continent, long and thin, collided with North America, creating folding and faulting in western New Jersey and southern Appalachia.

The swamps and meadows of Parsippany were created when the North American Plate separated from the African Plate. An aborted rift system or half-graben was created. The land area lowered between the Ramapo Fault in western Parsippany and a fault west of Paterson. The Ramapo Fault goes through the western part of the township.

The Wisconsin Glacier came into the area around 21,000 BCE and left around 13,000 BCE due to a warming climate. As the glacier slowly melted, this created rivers, streams and lakes, leaving most of the township under Lake Passaic, which was the biggest lake in New Jersey at that time, stretching from the edge of the Ramapo Fault in western Parsippany eastward to almost Paterson.

The area was first a tundra when the Wisconsin Glacier melted and then as the area warmed formed taiga/boreal forests, along with vast meadows. Slowly, Lake Passaic drained and formed swamps in the township; Troy Meadows and Lee Meadows (on the old Alderney Farm tract) are perfect examples. Swamps and meadows next to oak forests created a diverse flora and fauna spectrum.

As of 2026, the township is a member of Local Leaders for Responsible Planning in order to address the township's Mount Laurel doctrine-based housing obligations.

== Demographics ==
Historical population
Census	Pop.	Note	%±
1930	6,631		—
1940	10,976		65.5%
1950	15,290		39.3%
1960	25,557		67.1%
1970	55,112		115.6%
1980	49,868		−9.5%
1990	48,478		−2.8%
2000	50,649		4.5%
2010	53,238		5.1%
2020	56,162		5.5%
2023 (est.)	56,289	▲	0.2%
Population sources:1930 1940–2000 2000; 2010 2020

Based on the most recent U.S Census Bureau data, the racial makeup of Parsippany-Troy Hills was 26,787 (47.3%) White, 1,982 (3.5%) African American, 113 (0.2%) Native American, 21,520 (38%) Asian, 0 (0%) Pacific Islander, 113 (0.2%) from other races, and 1,223 (2.2%) from two or more races. Hispanic or Latino of any race were 5,210 persons (9.2%). Among the Asian population, largest ancestry groups were Indian, 14,373 (25.6%), followed by Chinese, 3,538 (6.3%), and Filipinos, 912 (1.6%). Among Hispanics and Latinos, the largest ancestry groups were Colombian, 900 (1.6%), followed by Puerto Rican, 586 (1%), and Mexican, 523 (0.9%).

=== 2020 census ===
Parsippany-Troy Hills township, Morris County, New Jersey – Racial and ethnic composition Note: the US Census treats Hispanic/Latino as an ethnic category. This table excludes Latinos from the racial categories and assigns them to a separate category. Hispanics/Latinos may be of any race.
Race / Ethnicity (NH = Non-Hispanic)	Pop 1990	Pop 2000	Pop 2010	Pop 2020	% 1990	% 2000	% 2010	% 2020
White alone (NH)	39,854	35,283	30,214	24,960	82.21%	69.66%	56.75%	44.44%
Black or African American alone (NH)	1,679	1,510	1,741	1,911	3.46%	2.98%	3.27%	3.40%
Native American or Alaska Native alone (NH)	61	43	81	77	0.13%	0.08%	0.15%	0.14%
Asian alone (NH)	4,847	9,124	15,443	21,694	10.00%	18.01%	29.01%	38.63%
Native Hawaiian or Pacific Islander alone (NH)	N/A	21	4	6	N/A	0.04%	0.01%	0.01%
Some Other Race alone (NH)	23	117	104	317	0.05%	0.23%	0.20%	0.56%
Mixed race or Multiracial (NH)	N/A	1,016	1,221	1,566	N/A	2.01%	2.29%	2.79%
Hispanic or Latino (any race)	2,014	3,535	4,430	5,631	4.15%	6.98%	8.32%	10.03%
Total	48,478	50,649	53,238	56,162	100.00%	100.00%	100.00%	100.00%

=== 2010 census ===
The 2010 United States census counted 53,238 people, 20,279 households, and 14,094 families in the township. The population density was 2,259.3 per square mile (872.3/km^{2}). There were 21,274 housing units at an average density of 902.8 per square mile (348.6/km^{2}). The racial makeup was 62.37% (33,204) White, 3.52% (1,874) Black or African American, 0.17% (92) Native American, 29.09% (15,487) Asian, 0.02% (8) Pacific Islander, 2.03% (1,082) from other races, and 2.80% (1,491) from two or more races. Hispanic or Latino of any race were 8.32% (4,430) of the population. As of 2010, 17.4% of the township's population self-identified as being Indian American, making them the largest minority group in the township; 6.6% of residents identified as being Chinese-American, which is the highest of any Morris County municipality.

Out of the total 20,279 households in the area, 30.9% of these households included children under the age of 18. Additionally, 58.3% of the households consisted of married couples living together, highlighting a majority presence of traditional family structures. In contrast, 7.9% of the households were led by a female householder without a husband present, suggesting a smaller portion of single-parent, female-led homes. Non-family households accounted for 30.5% of the total, indicating a significant portion of the population living without immediate family ties or living arrangements not involving nuclear families.

Furthermore, 25.0% of all households were composed of individuals living alone, demonstrating a notable share of single-person households. Within this segment, 7.9% of individuals were aged 65 or older and living alone, reflecting a portion of elderly residents who may require different community support or services. On average, household sizes were 2.58 individuals, while the average size for families specifically was slightly larger at 3.14 individuals, underscoring a pattern of smaller nuclear families and household groupings.

20.8% of the population were under the age of 18, 6.3% from 18 to 24, 29.7% from 25 to 44, 29.4% from 45 to 64, and 13.7% who were 65 years of age or older. The median age was 40.5 years. For every 100 females, the population had 97.1 males. For every 100 females ages 18 and older there were 95.7 males.

The Census Bureau's 2006–2010 American Community Survey showed that (in 2010 inflation-adjusted dollars) median household income was $85,760 (with a margin of error of +/− $2,882) and the median family income was $102,601 (+/− $4,650). Males had a median income of $67,109 (+/− $3,242) versus $50,415 (+/− $2,595) for females. The per capita income for the borough was $40,965 (+/− $1,434). About 1.8% of families and 3.2% of the population were below the poverty line, including 3.5% of those under age 18 and 5.7% of those age 65 or over.

=== 2000 census ===
As of the 2000 United States census, there were 50,649 people, 19,624 households, and 13,167 families residing in the township. The population density was 2,115.5 inhabitants per square mile (816.8/km^{2}). There were 20,066 housing units at an average density of 838.1 per square mile (323.6/km^{2}). The racial makeup of the township was 74.28% White, 3.11% African American, 0.12% Native American, 18.06% Asian, 0.06% Pacific Islander, 1.90% from other races, and 2.48% from two or more races. Hispanic or Latino of any race were 6.98% of the population.

There were 19,624 households, out of which 29.5% had children under the age of 18 living with them, 56.2% were married couples living together, 7.6% had a female householder with no husband present, and 32.9% were non-families. 27.1% of all households were made up of individuals, and 6.7% had someone living alone who was 65 years of age or older. The average household size was 2.53 and the average family size was 3.13.

In the township, the age distribution of the population shows 21.0% under the age of 18, 6.7% from 18 to 24, 35.2% from 25 to 44, 25.9% from 45 to 64, and 11.2% who were 65 years of age or older. The median age was 38 years. For every 100 females, there were 97.8 males. For every 100 females age 18 and over, there were 94.7 males.

The median income for a household in the township was $68,133 and the median income for a family was $81,041. Males had a median income of $51,175 versus $38,641 for females. The per capita income for the township was $32,220. About 2.6% of families and 3.9% of the population were below the poverty line, including 4.0% of those under age 18 and 6.3% of those age 65 or over.

Parsippany–Troy Hills has a large Indian American community, with 8.39% of Parsippany–Troy Hills's residents having identified themselves as being of Indian American ancestry in the 2000 Census, which was the eighth-highest of any municipality in New Jersey, for all places with 1,000 or more residents identifying their ancestry.

== Economy ==
From 1967 through 2015, the Vince Lombardi Trophy was exclusively handcrafted by Tiffany & Co. in Parsippany for the winning team of the Super Bowl, as is the Larry O'Brien Championship Trophy granted to the winner of the NBA Finals.

Allergan, B&G Foods, GAF Materials Corporation, Sun Chemical, Zoetis, Kings Food Markets, Lexus and Toyota Financial Services, Wyndham Worldwide Toys "R" Us, along with its parent company, Tru Kids, and PNY Technologies, a manufacturer of computer memory devices, are in Parsippany–Troy Hills.

The U.S. operations of Cadbury Adams, Ferrero, Reckitt Benckiser, Ricola and Safilo are located here.

Cendant Corporation moved its headquarters to Parsippany–Troy Hills in 2001; in 2006 Cendant separated into several different companies, including Avis Budget Group, parent company of Avis Rent a Car System and Budget Rent a Car.

== Sports ==
Parsippany SC is a soccer club that hosts teams in both the Super Y-League and the Super-20 League.

The Parsippany PAL offers a variety of recreational sports, programs, camps, and community events for all ages.

Par–Troy Little League East, one of Parsippany's two township Little League teams, competed in the 2012 Little League World Series, losing in the third round of play at South Williamsport, Pennsylvania, to a team from Petaluma, California.

== Government ==
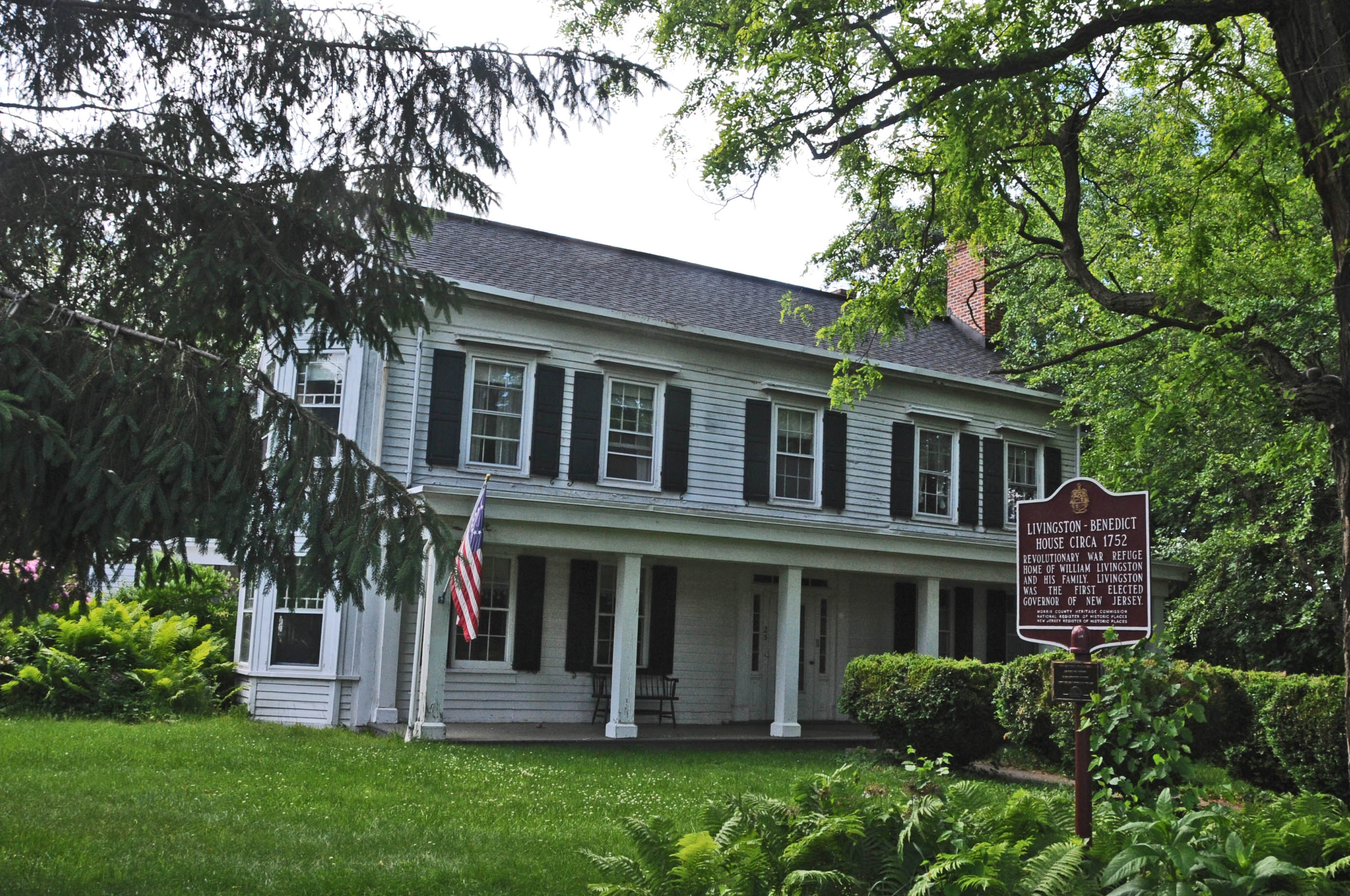
The Bowers–Livingston–Osborn House is on the U.S. National Register of Historic Places.

=== Local government ===
The township is governed within the Faulkner Act (formally known as the Optional Municipal Charter Law) under the Mayor-Council system of municipal government (Plan E), implemented based on the recommendations of a Charter Study Commission as of January 1, 1966. The township is one of 71 municipalities (of the 564) statewide that use this form of government. The governing body is comprised of the mayor and the five-member township council, all elected to four-year terms of office on an at-large basis in partisan elections held in odd-numbered years as part of the November general election. Either two or three council seats are up for vote each election, with the mayoral seat up for vote at the same time that two seats are up for vote. The mayor and council are separately elected, with the mayor, serving as the chief executive officer, and the council serving in the capacity of a legislative body.

Some responsibilities of the mayor include preparation of the budget, enforcement of the ordinances, supervision of municipal departments and property, execution of Council decisions, and oversight of other functions of the municipality. Some of the responsibilities of the Council include adopting ordinances, approval of contracts presented by the mayor, scheduling times and places for council meetings and designation of the official newspapers of the municipality.

As of 2026, the mayor of Parsippany–Troy Hills is Democrat Pulkit Desai, whose term of office ends December 31, 2029. Members of the Township Council are Council President Judy Hernandez (D, 2027), Council Vice President Diya Patel (D, 2029), Paul Carifi Jr. (R, 2027), Matt Kavanagh (D, 2029) and Matt McGrath (R, 2027).

==== List of mayors ====
- John E. J. Walsh (D) 1966 (died)
- Henry Luther (D) 1966–1974 (retired)
- Jack Fahy (D) 1974–1982 (lost reelection)
- Frank Priore (R) 1982–1994 (removed from office, indicted, served time)
- Mimi Letts (D) 1994–2005 (retired)
- Michael Luther (D) 2006–2010 (lost reelection)
- Jamie Barberio (R) 2010–2018 (lost reelection)
- Michael Soriano (D) 2018–2022 (lost reelection)
- Jamie Barberio (R) 2022–2026 (lost reelection)
- Pulkit Desai (D) 2026–present

=== Federal, state and county representation ===
Parsippany–Troy Hills Township is located in the 11th Congressional District and is part of New Jersey's 26th state legislative district.

For the 119th United States Congress, New Jersey's 11th congressional district is represented by Analilia Mejia (D, Glen Ridge) who was elected in a 2026 special election to serve for the remainder of the Congress following the resignation Mikie Sherrill (D, Montclair), who was elected Governor of New Jersey in 2025. New Jersey is represented in the United States Senate by Democrats Cory Booker (Newark, term ends 2027) and Andy Kim (Moorestown, term ends 2031).

For the 2026–2027 session, the 26th legislative district of the New Jersey Legislature is represented in the State Senate by Joseph Pennacchio (R, Rockaway Township) and in the General Assembly by Brian Bergen (R, Denville Township) and Jay Webber (R, Morris Plains).

Morris County is governed by a Board of County Commissioners comprised of seven members who are elected at-large in partisan elections to three-year terms on a staggered basis, with either one or three seats up for election each year as part of the November general election. Actual day-to-day operation of departments is supervised by County Administrator Deena Leary.

As of 2026, Morris County's Commissioners (with all terms ending December 31) are Director Stephen H. Shaw (R, Mountain Lakes, 2027), Deputy Director John Krickus (R, Washington Township, 2027), Douglas Cabana (R, Boonton Township, 2028), Thomas J. Mastrangelo (R, Montville, 2028), Christine Myers (R, Harding Township, 2028), Tayfun Selen (R, Chatham Township, 2026), and Deborah Smith (R, Denville Township, 2027).

The county's constitutional officers are County Clerk Ann F. Grossi (R, Parsippany–Troy Hills, 2028), Sheriff James M. Gannon (R, Boonton Township, 2028) and Surrogate Heather Darling (R, Roxbury, 2029).

=== Politics ===
United States presidential election results for Parsippany-Troy Hills 2024 2020 2016 2012 2008 2004
Year	Republican		Democratic		Third party(ies)	
Year	No.	%	No.	%	No.	%
2024	12,481	48.42%	12,642	49.04%	654	2.54%
2020	12,095	43.50%	15,369	55.28%	338	1.22%
2016	10,398	44.28%	12,291	52.34%	792	3.37%
2012	9,948	46.26%	11,324	52.66%	233	1.08%
2008	11,091	47.13%	12,219	51.92%	225	0.96%
2004	11,433	51.97%	10,397	47.26%	168	0.76%

As of March 2011, there were a total of 30,393 registered voters in Parsippany–Troy Hills Township, of which 7,022 (23.1%) were registered as Democrats, 10,046 (33.1%) were registered as Republicans and 13,310 (43.8%) were registered as Unaffiliated. There were 15 voters registered to other parties.

Gubernatorial election results for Parsippany-Troy Hills
Year	Republican		Democratic		Third party(ies)	
Year	No.	%	No.	%	No.	%
2025	8,447	41.46%	11,811	57.98%	114	0.56%
2021	8,161	49.61%	8,166	49.64%	122	0.74%
2017	6,632	47.37%	7,092	50.65%	277	1.98%
2013	9,083	65.54%	4,547	32.81%	228	1.65%
2009	8,384	54.20%	5,794	37.46%	1,290	8.34%
2005	7,477	51.00%	6,787	46.30%	396	2.70%

In the 2020 presidential election, out of 27,802 votes cast, Democrat Joe Biden received 55.3% of the vote (15,369 votes), Republican Donald Trump received 43.5% of the vote (12,095 votes) and other candidates received 1.2% of the vote (338 votes). In the 2012 presidential election, Democrat Barack Obama received 52.7% of the vote (11,324 cast), ahead of Republican Mitt Romney with 46.3% (9,948 votes), and other candidates with 1.1% (233 votes), among the 21,673 ballots cast by the township's 32,187 registered voters (168 ballots were spoiled), for a turnout of 67.3%. In the 2008 presidential election, Democrat Barack Obama received 51.7% of the vote (12,219 cast), ahead of Republican John McCain with 46.9% (11,091 votes) and other candidates with 1.0% (225 votes), among the 23,635 ballots cast by the township's 31,458 registered voters, for a turnout of 75.1%. In the 2004 presidential election, Republican George W. Bush received 51.8% of the vote (11,433 ballots cast), outpolling Democrat John Kerry with 47.1% (10,397 votes) and other candidates with 0.6% (168 votes), among the 22,061 ballots cast by the township's 30,505 registered voters, for a turnout percentage of 72.3.

In the 2013 gubernatorial election, Republican Chris Christie received 65.5% of the vote (9,083 cast), ahead of Democrat Barbara Buono with 32.8% (4,547 votes), and other candidates with 1.6% (228 votes), among the 14,280 ballots cast by the township's 32,046 registered voters (422 ballots were spoiled), for a turnout of 44.6%. In the 2009 gubernatorial election, Republican Chris Christie received 53.3% of the vote (8,384 ballots cast), ahead of Democrat Jon Corzine with 36.8% (5,794 votes), Independent Chris Daggett with 7.5% (1,176 votes) and other candidates with 0.7% (114 votes), among the 15,742 ballots cast by the township's 30,870 registered voters, yielding a 51.0% turnout.

United States Senate election results for Parsippany-Troy Hills1
Year	Republican		Democratic		Third party(ies)	
Year	No.	%	No.	%	No.	%
2024	11,205	46.61%	12,147	50.52%	690	2.87%
2018	8,726	46.53%	9,344	49.83%	683	3.64%
2012	8,892	45.23%	10,465	53.23%	304	1.55%
2006	7,023	51.65%	6,328	46.54%	247	1.82%

United States Senate election results for Parsippany-Troy Hills2
Year	Republican		Democratic		Third party(ies)	
Year	No.	%	No.	%	No.	%
2020	11,726	43.35%	14,954	55.28%	369	1.36%
2014	4,937	48.98%	4,961	49.22%	181	1.80%
2013	4,337	51.22%	4,052	47.86%	78	0.92%
2008	9,965	47.51%	10,621	50.64%	387	1.85%

== Fire protection ==
Parsippany–Troy Hills is protected by six different fire districts serving out of ten fire houses throughout the township. Each district operates as their own fire department with each having its own Chief and other line officers. Every district is 100% volunteer and are on call around the clock, with dispatching for all fire districts provided by the township police department.

- District 1: Mount Tabor Fire Department (Mount Tabor / west side of town), founded in 1910.
- District 2: Rainbow Lakes Fire Department (Rainbow Lakes section)
- District 3: Lake Parsippany Fire Department (Lake Parsippany Section), founded in 1935.
- District 4: Lake Hiawatha Fire Department (Lake Hiawatha Section), established in 1935.
- District 5: Parsippany District 5 Fire Department (East side of the township)
- District 6: Parsippany – Troy Hills Fire District 6 (Central part of the township), founded in 1929. Provides fire protection to Tivoli Gardens, Cambridge Village, Hills of Troy, Morris Hills Shopping Center, Green Hill Shopping Center, Hilton/Hampton Hotels, Sylvan way and Campus Drive Area, Jefferson Road Area, Lake Intervale, and Mazdabrook Housing and Senior centers, as well as sections of I-80, I-287, 46, 10, and 202, with stations at 60 Littleton Road (Main station) and Smith Road (sub-station).

== Education ==
=== Public schools ===
The Parsippany–Troy Hills School District serves students in pre-kindergarten through twelfth grade. The Parsippany Troy-Hills School District serves students in ten elementary schools, two middle schools, two high schools and an adult education center. The community served by the district is ethnically, culturally and linguistically diverse. As of the 2021–22 school year, the district, comprised of 14 schools, had an enrollment of 7,082 students and 634.8 classroom teachers (on an FTE basis), for a student–teacher ratio of 11.2:1. Schools in the district (with 2021–22 enrollment data from the National Center for Education Statistics) are Eastlake Elementary School (359 students; in grades PreK–5), Intervale Elementary School (255; K–5), Knollwood Elementary School (380; K–5), Lake Hiawatha Elementary School (417; PreK–5), Lake Parsippany Elementary School (271; K–5), Littleton Elementary School (422; K–5), Mount Tabor Elementary School (354; K–5), Northvail Elementary School (383; K–5), Rockaway Meadow Elementary School (258; K–5), Troy Hills Elementary School (290; K–5), Brooklawn Middle School (898; 6–8), Central Middle School (807; 6–8), Parsippany High School (898; 9–12) and Parsippany Hills High School (1,028; 9–12).

=== Private schools ===
Parsippany Christian School, established in 1970, served students in preschool through twelfth grade as a ministry of Parsippany Baptist Church prior to its closure in 2019.

All Saints' Academy serves preschool though eighth grade, as the result of a 2009 merger of Saint Christopher Parochial school and Saint Peter the Apostle School. St. Elizabeth School, founded in 1970, offers Montessori education to children in preschool through sixth grade. Both are Catholic schools operated under the auspices of the Roman Catholic Diocese of Paterson.

== Popular culture references ==
- In the Seinfeld episode “The Mom & Pop Store” (originally aired on November 17, 1994), Jerry loses his shoes and finds out that they ended up at a garage sale in Parsippany.
- In The Karate Kid, Daniel's Uncle Louie is said to be from Parsippany.
- In the movie The Ex, Wesley (Lucian Maisel) states, "So during the school year I live with my mom in New Jersey. And I spend the summer here with my dad. But he's at work all the time, and all my friends live back in Parsippany, so it's pretty gay."

== Transportation ==
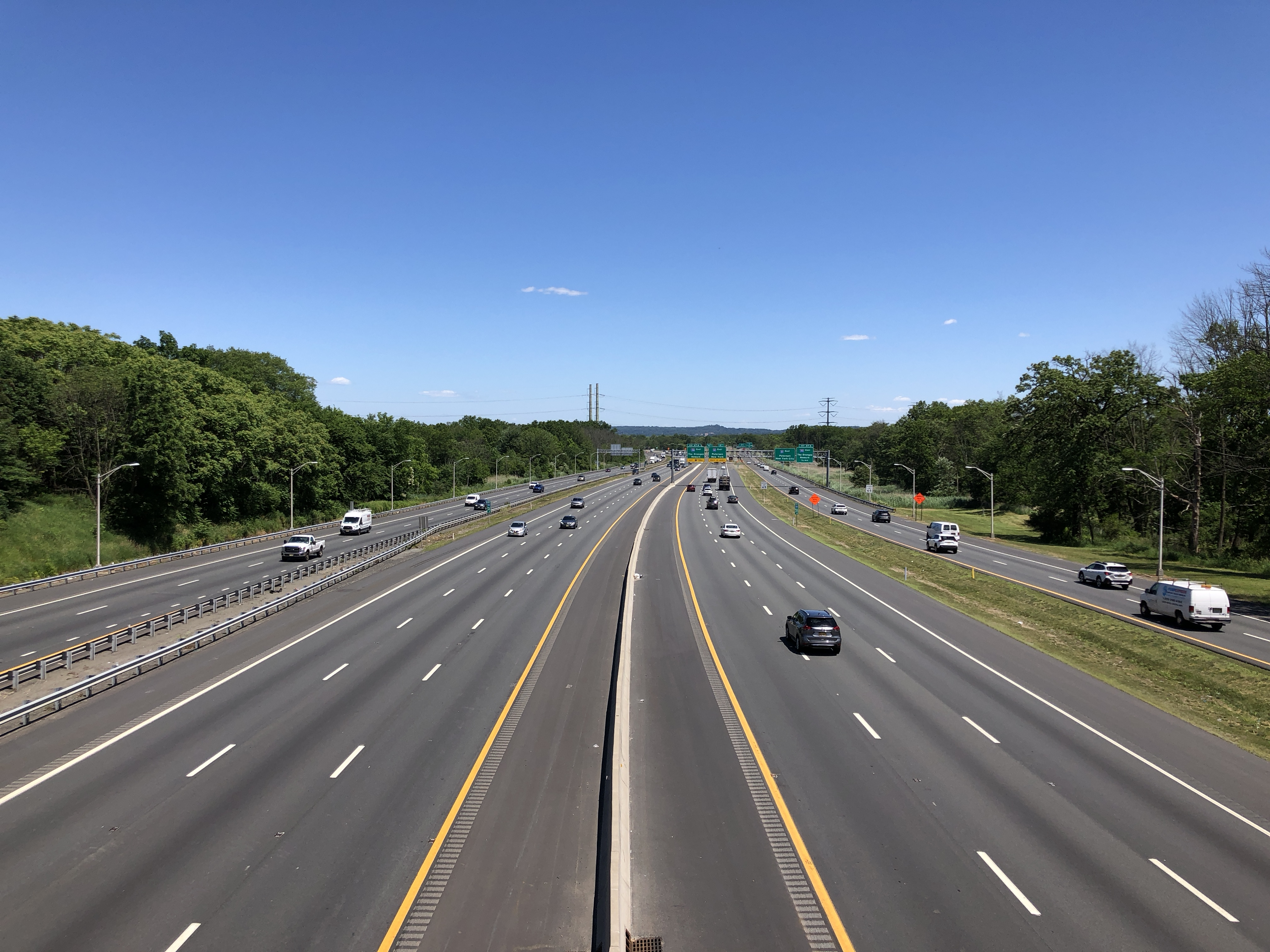
Interstate 80 eastbound between Interstate 287 and Interstate 280 in Parsippany–Troy Hills

=== Roads and highways ===
As of May 2010, the township had a total of 208.45 miles (335.47 km) of roadways, the most of any municipality in the county, of which 173.78 miles (279.67 km) are maintained by Parsippany–Troy Hills, 11.30 miles (18.19 km) by Morris County and 23.37 miles (37.61 km) by the New Jersey Department of Transportation.

Parsippany lies at the crossroads of many major roadways including Interstates 80, 280 (including its western terminus) and 287, U.S. Routes 46 and 202, New Jersey Routes 10 and 53, as well as County Route 511. In 2013, Route 53 was renamed as the "Alex DeCroce Memorial Highway" in honor of Alex DeCroce, a township resident who was a member of the New Jersey General Assembly from 1989 until his death in 2012.

=== Public transportation ===
The Mount Tabor station in neighboring Denville Township offers train service on the NJ Transit Morris & Essex Lines, with service to and from Penn Station in Midtown Manhattan and Hoboken Terminal.

NJ Transit provides bus service on the 29 and 79 route to and from Newark, with local service on the 871, 872, 873, 874, 875, 880 routes.

The Taiwanese airline China Airlines provides private bus service to John F. Kennedy International Airport from Parsippany to feed its flight to Taipei, Taiwan.

Parsippany runs a tax-payer-funded two-route bus system known as Parsippany Transit that offers bus service at no additional cost to all residents and operates only on weekdays. No Holidays or weekends.

Bus service to the Port Authority Bus Terminal in Midtown Manhattan is provided by Lakeland Bus Lines along Route 46 and Interstate 80.

Morristown Municipal Airport, a general aviation airport, is located 6.7 miles (10.8 km) from the township.

== Notable people ==
People who were born in, residents of, or otherwise closely associated with Parsippany–Troy Hills

- Charlie Ayers (born 1966), former executive chef for Google
- Joe Bernard (born 1963), college football coach who was head coach of the Fairfield Stags football team in 2001 and 2002
- Debbie Bramwell-Washington (born 1966), IFBB professional bodybuilder
- R. J. Cobbs (born 1982), defensive back who has played in the NFL for the New York Giants, person of interest in 2012 hit and run in Morristown, New Jersey
- Darron Collins (born 1970), human ecologist and academic administrator specializing in ethnobotany, who became president of the College of the Atlantic in 2011
- Clarence Curry (born 1981), defensive specialist who played in the NFL for the Arizona Cardinals
- Dillon Danis (born 1993), professional mixed martial artist who competes in the Welterweight division of Bellator MMA.
- Bobby Darin (1936–1973), singer, songwriter and actor known for such songs as "Splish Splash", "Dream Lover", "Mack the Knife", and "Beyond the Sea"
- Alex DeCroce (1936–2012), member of the New Jersey General Assembly from 1989 until his death in 2012, who was memorialized with the renaming of Route 53 as the "Alex DeCroce Memorial Highway"
- BettyLou DeCroce (born 1952), politician who was sworn into the General Assembly in 2012 to succeed her husband
- Michael Dogbe (born 1996), defensive end for the Arizona Cardinals
- Bobby Edwards (born 1995), soccer goalkeeper for FC Cincinnati in Major League Soccer
- Sherman Edwards (1919–1981), songwriter best known for writing the lyrics and music for the musical 1776
- Keith Ferris (born 1929), artist/creator of the B-17 mural "Fortresses Under Fire", World War II wing, National Air and Space Museum, Smithsonian Institution, Washington, D.C.
- Dean Gallo (1935–1994), represented New Jersey's 11th congressional district from 1985 until his death
- Jessica Lee Goldyn (born 1985), Broadway actress
- Bill Hands (1940–2017), Major League Baseball pitcher
- Phebe Ann Jacobs (1785–1850), Congregationalist born into slavery on the Beverwyck plantation in Lake Hiawatha, whose posthumous biography is thought to be one of the inspirations for Harriet Beecher-Stowe's abolitionist novel Uncle Tom's Cabin.
- James Jean (born 1979), award-winning artist and illustrator
- Danielle Jonas (born 1986), wife of Kevin Jonas and reality star who appears in Married to Jonas
- Jane Krakowski (born 1968), actress, best known for her roles on Ally McBeal and 30 Rock
- Al Krevis (born 1952), former American football player who played at offensive tackle in the NFL for the New York Jets and the Cincinnati Bengals
- Steve Krisiloff (born 1946), race car driver who started the Indianapolis 500 in 11 races
- George Kurtz (born c. 1970), co-founder and CEO of cybersecurity company CrowdStrike, who was the founder of Foundstone and chief technology officer of McAfee
- Robert Lazzarini (born 1965), sculptor and installation artist
- Fei-Fei Li (born 1976), professor of computer science at Stanford University, who is director of the Stanford Artificial Intelligence Lab (SAIL) and the Stanford Vision Lab
- Nelson Lyon (1939–2012), writer, actor, photographer and film director, known for his directorial debut The Telephone Book
- Paul Mirabella (born 1954), pitcher who played for 13 seasons in Major League Baseball
- Johnnie Morant (born 1981), wide receiver for the Oakland Raiders (2004–2006)
- Edward Mosberg (1926–2022), Polish-American Holocaust survivor, educator and philanthropist
- Jeff Okudah (born 1999), cornerback for the Detroit Lions
- Joe Orsulak (born 1962), major league baseball player
- Nimesh Patel (born 1986), comedian and television writer who was the first Indian American writer on Saturday Night Live
- Garrett Reisman (born 1968), NASA astronaut
- Zoogz Rift (1953–2011), musician, painter and professional wrestling personality
- Joe Rigoli (born 1956), baseball scout for the St. Louis Cardinals
- Angelo Savoldi (1914–2013), former professional wrestler
- Herb Scherer (1929–2012), professional basketball player for the Tri-Cities Blackhawks and New York Knicks
- Tony Sorrentino (born 1983), football coach who is the wide receivers coach for the Arizona Cardinals of the National Football League
- UmaSofia Srivastava, beauty pageant titleholder who won Miss Teen USA 2023
- Chris Singleton (born 1967), linebacker for the New England Patriots (1990–1992, 1993) and Miami Dolphins (1993, 1994–1996)
- Tommy Vigh Jr. (born 1964), race car driver in the ARCA Menards Series
- Richie Zisk (born 1949), former major league baseball player
