= Johnnie Morant =

American football player (born 1981)

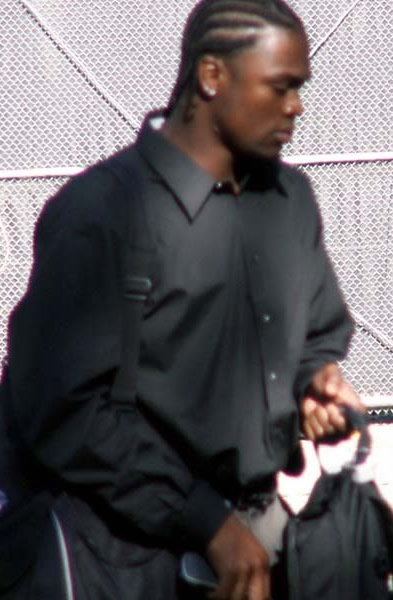

No. 19
- Position: Wide receiver

Personal information
- Born: December 7, 1981 (age 44); Newark, New Jersey, U.S.
- Listed height: 6 ft 4 in (1.93 m)
- Listed weight: 224 lb (102 kg)

Career information
- College: Syracuse
- NFL draft: 2004: 5th round, 134th overall pick

Career history
- 2004–2006: Oakland Raiders
- 2007: Oakland Raiders*
- 2008: Toronto Argonauts
- 2009: Hamilton Tiger-Cats*
- * Offseason or practice squad member only

Career NFL statistics
- Receptions: 8
- Receiving yards: 90
- Stats at Pro Football Reference
- Stats at CFL.ca

Johnnie Morant Jr. (born December 7, 1981) is an American former professional football player who was a wide receiver in the National Football League (NFL) and Canadian Football League (CFL). He was selected by the Oakland Raiders in the fifth round of the 2004 NFL draft. He played college football for the Syracuse Orange. He is the former head strength and conditioning coach at East Carter High School.

Morant was also a member of the Toronto Argonauts and Hamilton Tiger-Cats.

== Early life ==
Born in Newark and raised in Parsippany–Troy Hills, New Jersey, Morant graduated from Parsippany Hills High School in 2000. After an outstanding senior campaign, Morant was rated the best receiver in the East and third best in the nation.

== College career ==
He finished his career at Syracuse University with 88 receptions for 1,535 yards (17.4 avg) and seven touchdowns, adding 524 yards on 22 kickoff returns (23.8 avg) and 35 yards with a score on six carries (5.8 avg) while appearing in 35 games. His 1,535 yards ranks 10th on the school's career-record list, while his 17.4-yard average ranks seventh. Morant also had a string of at least one reception in 29 consecutive games.

== Professional career ==
=== Oakland Raiders ===
Morant was selected by the Oakland Raiders in the fifth round (134th overall) of the 2004 NFL draft. He played three seasons for the team before being released on August 28, 2007.

=== Toronto Argonauts ===
On June 22, 2008, Morant signed a contract with the Toronto Argonauts of the Canadian Football League He went on to play in 11 games for the Argonauts.

=== Hamilton Tiger-Cats ===
Morant was signed by the Hamilton Tiger-Cats on February 6, 2009. He then retired after the 2009 season.

== Coaching career ==
1. 2009-2011 Parsippany High School, assistant head coach.
2. 2012 Southern Tech, Morant was assistant head coach, offensive coordinator & head strength and conditioning coach
3. 2013-2014 Kentucky Christian University, head strength and conditioning coach and wide receivers coach
4. 2015-Present East Carter High School, strength and conditioning coach and wide receivers coach
