= Charlie Ayers =

American chef

- Ayers in 2006
- Born: Charles David Ayers, Jr. July 5, 1966 (age 60); Chicago, Illinois, U.S.
- Education: Johnson & Wales University

Charles David Ayers, Jr. (born July 5, 1966) is an American chef, cookbook author, and restaurateur. He is the former executive chef for Google, from 1999 until 2006. His work there was widely publicized in the media, and David Vise's corporate history The Google Story contains an entire chapter about him called "Charlie's Place." By the time he left Google in 2006, Ayers and his team of five chefs and 150 employees were serving 4,000 daily lunches and dinners in 10 cafes across the company's headquarters campus in Mountain View, California.

== Early life and education ==
Ayers was born on July 5, 1966, in Chicago. He grew up in Brooklyn and Parsippany, New Jersey, where he attended Parsippany High School and graduated in 1985.

== Career ==
Ayers worked as a private and personal chef to the rock band Grateful Dead in the 1980s. Ayers began his professional career in New Jersey working for Hilton Hotels, at their Meadowlands and Parsippany locations in New Jersey.

Later he left Hilton to attend culinary school at Johnson & Wales University in Providence, Rhode Island, where he graduated in 1990. He was a chef at several restaurants in the Providence and Boston areas, and then moved to California, where he worked as a chef at Stoddard's Brewhouse in Sunnyvale, Left in Albuquerque, New Mexico, and Blue Chalk Cafe and the Peninsula Creamery, both in downtown Palo Alto in the Silicon Valley.

From 1999 to 2006, Ayers worked as an executive chef at Google in its Mountain View, California headquarters. He obtained the job at Google after winning a cook-off that was judged by what were then the company's 40 employees. Ayers reportedly earned $26 million (USD) from his Google stock options.

On January 20, 2009, Ayers started Calafia Café/Calafia Market a Go Go in Palo Alto. It remained in operation until August 2018. The financing to open Calafia Café came from former Google employees and a couple that worked for Cisco.

Following the closure of Calafia Café in August 2018, Ayers transitioned to providing culinary consulting and private dining experiences.

== Publications ==
- Ayers, Charlie (2008). Food 2.0: Secrets From the Chef Who Fed Google. DK Cookery General. Penguin. ISBN 9780756643409.
- Ayers, Charlie (2008). Eat Yourself Smart: Power up your day with recipes from the chef who fed Google. Dorling Kindersley Limited. ISBN 9781405336178.
