= Michael Dogbe =

American football player (born 1996)

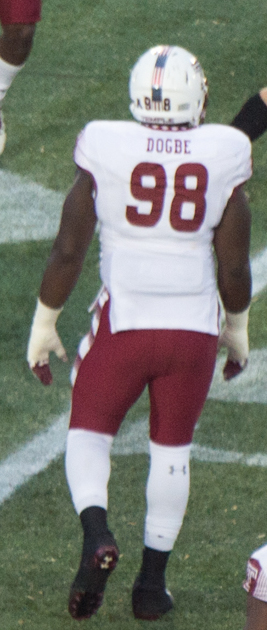
- Dogbe with the Temple Owls in 2016

No. 91, 97
- Position: Defensive end

Personal information
- Born: May 5, 1996 (age 30); Parsippany–Troy Hills, New Jersey, U.S.
- Listed height: 6 ft 3 in (1.91 m)
- Listed weight: 295 lb (134 kg)

Career information
- High school: Parsippany Hills (Parsippany–Troy Hills)
- College: Temple
- NFL draft: 2019: 7th round, 249th overall pick

Career history
- Arizona Cardinals (2019–2022); Jacksonville Jaguars (2023)*; Houston Texans (2023); Minnesota Vikings (2023)*
- * Offseason or practice squad member only

Career NFL statistics
- Total tackles: 62
- Sacks: 2
- Fumble recoveries: 1
- Stats at Pro Football Reference

Michael Dogbe (born May 5, 1996) is an American former professional football player who was a defensive end in the National Football League (NFL).

== Early life ==
Dogbe was born Parsippany–Troy Hills, New Jersey, and attended Parsippany Hills High School. He played college football for the Temple Owls and was selected by the Arizona Cardinals in the seventh round of the 2019 NFL draft.

== Professional career ==
Pre-draft measurables
Height	Weight	Arm length	Hand span	40-yard dash	10-yard split	20-yard split	20-yard shuttle	Three-cone drill	Broad jump	Bench press
6 ft 3 in (1.91 m)	284 lb (129 kg)	33 1/2 in (0.85 m)	9 1/8 in (0.23 m)	5.07 s	1.68 s	2.68 s	4.62 s	7.49 s	9 ft 2 in (2.79 m)	34 reps
All values from Pro Day

=== Arizona Cardinals ===
Dogbe was selected by the Arizona Cardinals in the seventh round (249th overall) of the 2019 NFL draft. He played in eight games for the Cardinals in his rookie year.

On September 8, 2020, Dogbe was waived by the Cardinals and re-signed to the practice squad the next day. He was elevated to the active roster on November 7, November 19, and November 28 for the team's weeks 9, 11, and 12 games against the Miami Dolphins, Seattle Seahawks, and New England Patriots. He recorded his first career sack against Seattle. On January 5, 2021, Dogbe signed a reserve/futures contract with the Cardinals.

On March 14, 2022, Dogbe signed a one-year contract extension with the Cardinals. He played in nine games before being released on November 10 and re-signed to the practice squad. He was promoted to the active roster on December 24.

=== Jacksonville Jaguars ===
On March 22, 2023, Dogbe signed a one-year contract with the Jacksonville Jaguars. He was released on August 29, 2023.

=== Houston Texans ===
On September 13, 2023, Dogbe signed with the Houston Texans, active roster but was released six days later.

=== Minnesota Vikings ===
On October 31, 2023, Dogbe was signed to the Minnesota Vikings practice squad. He was released on November 14.

== Personal life ==
Dogbe was born in the United States to Nigerian parents.
