= Chris Singleton (American football) =

American football player (born 1967)

No. 55
- Position: Linebacker

Personal information
- Born: February 20, 1967 (age 59); Parsippany, New Jersey, U.S.
- Listed height: 6 ft 2 in (1.88 m)
- Listed weight: 246 lb (112 kg)

Career information
- High school: Parsippany Hills (NJ)
- College: Arizona
- NFL draft: 1990: 1st round, 8th overall pick

Career history
- New England Patriots (1990–1993); Miami Dolphins (1993-1996)

Awards and highlights
- First-team All-Pac-10 (1988)

Career NFL statistics
- Tackles: 341
- Sacks: 7
- Interceptions: 2
- Stats at Pro Football Reference

Chris Singleton (born February 20, 1967) is an American former professional football player who was a linebacker for the New England Patriots (1990–1992, 1993) and the Miami Dolphins (1993, 1994–1996) in the National Football League (NFL).

== Playing career ==
Singleton graduated from Parsippany Hills High School in Parsippany–Troy Hills, New Jersey, and played college football at the University of Arizona. Singleton was selected by the Patriots as the eighth pick in the first round of the 1990 NFL draft. In week 11 of the 1992 season, he had 82-yard interception return for a touchdown against the Indianapolis Colts.
