= Troy Hills, New Jersey =

Populated place in Morris County, New Jersey, US

- Census-designated place
- Location in Morris County Location in New Jersey Location in the United States
- Coordinates: 40°51′9″N 74°23′32″W
- Country: United States
- State: New Jersey
- County: Morris
- Township: Parsippany–Troy Hills

Area
  - Total: 2.92 sq mi (7.55 km^{2})
  - Land: 2.88 sq mi (7.45 km^{2})
  - Water: 0.039 sq mi (0.10 km^{2})
- Elevation: 225 ft (69 m)

Population (2020)
  - Total: 5,081
  - Density: 1,765.3/sq mi (681.58/km^{2})
- Time zone: UTC−05:00 (Eastern (EST))
  - Summer (DST): UTC−04:00 (EDT)
- ZIP Code: 07054 (Parsippany)
- Area codes: 973/862
- FIPS code: 34-74150
- GNIS feature ID: 2806209

Troy Hills is a census-designated place (CDP) in the township of Parsippany–Troy Hills, Morris County, New Jersey, United States. As of the 2020 census, it had a population of 5,081.

== Geography ==
Troy Hills is in eastern Morris County, in the southeast part of Parsippany–Troy Hills Township. It is bordered to the north and west by the Parsippany CDP, to the south by Whippany in Hanover Township, and to the east by Troy Meadows, the largest freshwater marsh in New Jersey.

Interstate 80 forms the northern edge of the CDP, and Jefferson Road is the western edge. Troy Hills is 6 miles (10 km) northeast of Morristown and 17 miles (27 km) northwest of Newark.

According to the U.S. Census Bureau, the Troy Hills CDP has a total area of 2.92 square miles (7.56 km^{2}), of which 2.88 square miles (7.46 km^{2}) are land and 0.04 square miles (0.10 km^{2}), or 1.27%, are water. The community is drained by Troy Brook, which flows east into Troy Meadows and is a tributary of the Whippany River, part of the Passaic River watershed.

== Demographics ==
Historical population
Census	Pop.	Note	%±
2020	5,081		—
U.S. Decennial Census

Troy Hills first appeared as a census designated place in the 2020 U.S. census.

=== 2020 census ===
As of the 2020 census, Troy Hills had a population of 5,081. The median age was 45.1 years. 20.8% of residents were under the age of 18 and 19.1% of residents were 65 years of age or older. For every 100 females there were 94.2 males, and for every 100 females age 18 and over there were 91.6 males age 18 and over.

100.0% of residents lived in urban areas, while 0.0% lived in rural areas.

There were 1,576 households in Troy Hills, of which 40.6% had children under the age of 18 living in them. Of all households, 78.0% were married-couple households, 7.0% were households with a male householder and no spouse or partner present, and 12.9% were households with a female householder and no spouse or partner present. About 10.4% of all households were made up of individuals and 6.3% had someone living alone who was 65 years of age or older.

There were 1,620 housing units, of which 2.7% were vacant. The homeowner vacancy rate was 1.0% and the rental vacancy rate was 4.7%.

Troy Hills CDP, New Jersey – Racial and ethnic composition Note: the US Census treats Hispanic/Latino as an ethnic category. This table excludes Latinos from the racial categories and assigns them to a separate category. Hispanics/Latinos may be of any race.
Race / Ethnicity (NH = Non-Hispanic)	Pop 2020	2020
White alone (NH)	2,169	42.69%
Black or African American alone (NH)	91	1.79%
Native American or Alaska Native alone (NH)	11	0.22%
Asian alone (NH)	2,421	47.65%
Native Hawaiian or Pacific Islander alone (NH)	5	0.10%
Other race alone (NH)	15	0.30%
Mixed race or Multiracial (NH)	111	2.18%
Hispanic or Latino (any race)	258	5.08%
Total	5,081	100.00%
