= R. J. Cobbs =

American football player (born 1982)

No. 36, 88
- Position: Defensive back

Personal information
- Born: July 26, 1982 (age 44); Parsippany-Troy Hills, New Jersey, U.S.
- Listed height: 5 ft 11 in (1.80 m)
- Listed weight: 190 lb (86 kg)

Career information
- High school: Parsippany Hills (NJ)
- College: Massachusetts
- NFL draft: 2006: undrafted

Career history
- Minnesota Vikings (2006)*; New York Giants (2006)
- * Offseason or practice squad member only
- Stats at Pro Football Reference

Robert J. Cobbs (born July 26, 1982) is an American former professional football defensive back in the National Football League for the New York Giants. He played college football at the University of Massachusetts Amherst where he was a standout playing running back, wide receiver and defensive back. Cobbs was undrafted, but signed out of college with the Minnesota Vikings. Cobbs is a graduate of Parsippany Hills High School in Parsippany, New Jersey. Cobbs now coaches football at Delbarton School in Morristown, NJ.
