= Clarence Curry =

American football player (born 1981)

No. 41
- Position: Defensive back

Personal information
- Born: December 7, 1981 (age 44); Rochester, Michigan, U.S.
- Listed height: 6 ft 1 in (1.85 m)
- Listed weight: 210 lb (95 kg)

Career information
- High school: Parsippany (Parsippany–Troy Hills, New Jersey)
- College: Villanova
- NFL draft: 2004: undrafted

Career history
- Arizona Cardinals (2004–2005); Rhein Fire (2005); Philadelphia Soul (2006); Los Angeles Avengers (2007)*; New Orleans VooDoo (2007); Nashville Kats (2007)*; Albany Conquest (2007–2008); Mahoning Valley Thunder (2009); Reading Express (2010–2012); Lehigh Valley Steelhawks (2013)
- * Offseason or practice squad member only

Career NFL statistics
- Games played: 1
- Stats at Pro Football Reference

Career AFL statistics
- Tackles: 5
- Pass breakups: 1
- Stats at ArenaFan.com

Clarence Curry (born December 7, 1981) is an American former professional football player who was a defensive back for the Arizona Cardinals of the National Football League (NFL). He played college football for the Villanova Wildcats.

Curry was also a member of the Rhein Fire, Philadelphia Soul, Los Angeles Avengers, New Orleans VooDoo, Nashville Kats, Albany Conquest, Mahoning Valley Thunder, Reading Express, and Lehigh Valley Steelhawks.

== Early life ==
Curry attended Parsippany High School in Parsippany–Troy Hills, New Jersey, where he was a letterman in football, basketball, and track. In football, he was a Second-team All-County and Honorable mention All-Area selection. He was also named to the All-County and All-Area teams by the Daily Record, All-County by the Newark Star Ledger and All-State Group III. In track, as a senior, he was an All-Conference, All-Area, All-County, and All-Group III States selection. In basketball, he was an All-Conference, Second-team All-County and Honorable Mention All-Area selection.

== College career ==
Curry attended Villanova University, where he majored in communications and played with future Philadelphia Eagles Running back Brian Westbrook. As a freshman in 2000, Curry played mainly on special teams, recorded six tackles on the season, he also blocked a punt and recovered it in the endzone for a touchdown against William & Mary. As a sophomore in 2001, he recorded 32 tackles, 10 passes broken up and two interceptions. As a junior in 2002, he recorded 38 total tackles, two interceptions, nine passes broken up, one fumble recovery and one tackle-for-loss. As a senior in 2003, he helped lead the school to the #1 ranked scoring defense and total defense in the conference and to the Division I-AA National Championship Semi-Finals. During his career, he also helped the school win two conference championships, he was also an All-Conference selection.

== Professional career ==
=== National Football League ===
Curry went unselected in the 2004 NFL draft, however he was signed by the Arizona Cardinals as an undrafted free agent. As a rookie in 2004, he played in one game for the Cardinals. Then in 2005 he was released on August 9, 2005, during preseason cuts.

=== Arena Football League ===
In 2005, Curry signed with the Philadelphia Soul of the Arena Football League and joined their practice squad however, he was later promoted to their active roster and played in one game recording one tackle. After the season, on July 12, 2006, Curry was re-signed by the Soul, along with Eddie Moten. However, on February 23, he was released by the Soul during training camp.

On May 4, Curry was signed to the practice squad of the Los Angeles Avengers, along with Offensive lineman Phil Hawkins and Defensive back Kairi Cooper, after the team placed Defensive back Rushen Jones on Injured Reserve, however he did not stay with the team, and he joined the New Orleans VooDoo. A stop which also would not last, as he signed with the Nashville Kats prior to their Week 13 game. On June 6, he was signed to the Kats' practice squad.

=== af2 ===
In 2007, Curry played for the Albany Conquest of af2. For his rookie season in af2, he played in four games and started one and recorded 21 tackles, two interceptions and four passes broken up. He was reassigned to the Conquest in 2008, and played in 13 games, starting six and recorded 52 tackles, two interceptions, two tackles-for-losses, 10 passes broken up and one fumble recovery. He also recorded three kick returns for 53 yards and he also recorded one reception for a five-yard touchdown.

On January 21, 2009, he was assigned to the Mahoning Valley Thunder.

== Reading Express ==
For the 2010 season, Curry played for the Reading Express of the American Indoor Football Association. He will return in 2011 when the Express move to the Indoor Football League.

== Personal ==
Curry has two siblings, Felicia & Kimberly, and is the son of Clarence Jr. and Brenda Curry.

== See also ==
- List of alumni of Villanova University#Sports and athletics
- List of National Football League and Arena football players
