= Parsippany Hills High School =

Public high school in Morris County, New Jersey, United States

Location
- 20 Rita Drive; Parsippany-Troy Hills, Morris County, New Jersey 07950; United States; 40°51′41″N 74°27′22″W

Information
- Type: Public high school
- Motto: Knowledge is Power
- Established: 1969
- School district: Parsippany-Troy Hills School District
- NCES School ID: 341248004432
- Principal: Matthew Thompson
- Faculty: 103.0 FTEs
- Grades: 9-12
- Enrollment: 1,021 (as of 2023–24)
- Student to teacher ratio: 9.9:1
- Colors: Black; Columbia Blue and white
- Athletics conference: Northwest Jersey Athletic Conference (general); North Jersey Super Football Conference (football)
- Team name: Vikings
- Rivals: Parsippany High School; Sparta High School (New Jersey)
- Publication: Concept
- Newspaper: Voyager
- Yearbook: Aegis
- Website: phhs.pthsd.k12.nj.us/o/phhs

Parsippany Hills High School is a four-year comprehensive public high school in the township of Parsippany-Troy Hills, in Morris County, in the U.S. state of New Jersey, serving students in ninth through twelfth grade as one of the two secondary schools of the Parsippany-Troy Hills School District. Built in 1969, the school serves students who live in the western half of Parsippany. Its companion school in the district is Parsippany High School.

As of the 2023–24 school year, the school had an enrollment of 1,021 students and 103.0 classroom teachers (on an FTE basis), for a student–teacher ratio of 9.9:1. There were 109 students (10.7% of enrollment) eligible for free lunch and 50 (4.9% of students) eligible for reduced-cost lunch.

Enrollment by Grade:

| | 9 | 10 | 11 | 12 | Ungraded |
| Students | 221 | 257 | 278 | 265 | 7 |

Enrollment by Race/Ethnicity:

| | American Indian/ Alaska Native | Asian | Black | Hispanic | Native Hawaiian/ Pacific Islander | White | Two or More Races |
| Students | – | 382 | 28 | 151 | 4 | 429 | 34 |

Enrollment by Gender:

| | Male | Female |
| Students | 519 | 509 |

== History ==
Construction of a new high school was approved in a 1967 referendum. The name Parsippany Hills was chosen in February 1969 from a list of 28 alternatives that had been submitted, ending a plan that had named the schools as East and West.

Constructed at a cost of $4.75 million (equivalent to $41.7 million in 2025) and designed to accommodate an enrollment of 1,800, the school opened in September 1969 with 1,200 students in ninth through eleventh grades, primarily those living south of U.S. Route 46. In the 2008–09 school year, Parsippany Hills High School saw the opening of the New N-Wing, an addition off the back of the school.

== Awards, recognition and rankings ==
The school was the 58th-ranked public high school in New Jersey out of 339 schools statewide in New Jersey Monthly magazine's September 2014 cover story on the state's "Top Public High Schools", using a new ranking methodology. The school had been ranked 23rd in the state of 328 schools in 2012, after being ranked 50th in 2010 out of 322 schools listed. The magazine ranked the school 87th in 2008 out of 316 schools. The school was also ranked 87th in the magazine's September 2006 issue, which surveyed 316 schools across the state. PHHS was ranked #7 out of 98 schools in the 2010 "FG" District Factor Group (socioeconomic measure). Schooldigger.com ranked the school tied for 151st out of 381 public high schools statewide in its 2011 rankings (a decrease of 30 positions from the 2010 ranking) which were based on the combined percentage of students classified as proficient or above proficient on the mathematics (83.6%) and language arts literacy (93.4%) components of the High School Proficiency Assessment (HSPA).

== Academics ==
Parsippany Hills High School offers the basic math, science, English, and history courses, but also has a wide range of elective courses ranging from human development to choir to marketing. Parsippany Hills also offers its students a wide range of Advanced Placement (AP) courses.

During the 2023-24 school year, 59.9% of students at Parsippany Hills High School were enrolled in at least one Advanced Placement course, compared with 35.9% of students statewide.

96.8% of Parsippany Hills teachers hold a master's degree or doctorate in the field that they teach in. Parsippany Hills also has a student-to-faculty ratio of 10.6 students per every faculty member.

Parsippany Hills students can connect to the Internet, with most school computers having Internet connections. Most wall-mounted televisions in the school are equipped with cable television.

In order to graduate from Parsippany Hills High School, a student must take at least 24 credits of courses, where one credit equals a one period full-year class. A student must take four years of English, three years of mathematics, three years of science, three years of social sciences, one year of a career development course, one year of a foreign language, and one year of a visual and performing arts elective. In addition, all students must pass the New Jersey High School Proficiency Assessment (HSPA) in their junior or senior year.

Parsippany Hills High School uses a four marking-period year, which are known as quarters. Two quarters make up one semester. The school uses a rotating drop-block schedule, where each student attends 6 of their 8 classes each day. Each period is 56 minutes with a 4 minute passing period between classes.

== Arts ==
Parsippany Hills offers a wide range of artistic classes, from drawing to ceramics, offering 10 different courses in visual arts. The visual arts program offerings include AP Studio Art, Digital Photography, Animation, and Advanced Ceramics.

Parsippany Hills has a large drama club, known unofficially as the Parsippany Hills Players. Past productions have included The Odd Couple: Female Version, West Side Story, Guys and Dolls, South Pacific, Picnic, Zombie Prom, The Importance of Being Earnest, Bye Bye Birdie, Aida, Seussical, Legally Blonde, The Drowsy Chaperone, and 42nd Street. In the spring 2007 production of How to Succeed in Business Without Really Trying, the Parsippany Hills Players saw a record audience. In 2020, the drama club had to cancel their production of Newsies due to the COVID-19 Pandemic. In 2021, the Parsippany Hills Players performed Oklahoma! on an outdoor stage in the parking lot due to the pandemic. In 2022, the drama club was once again able to perform indoors in their production of Mary Poppins. The Parsippany Hills Players’ most recent production was Our Town, and in 2023 they will be performing The Music Man.

The marching band, in circuit from June to November, has taken a total of six Northern USSBA States Championship titles ('94, '97,'04, '06, '07, '08) and three state championship titles ('02, '04, '08). In both 2004 and 2008, PHHSMB captured two championship titles. At the All-state championships in 2006, they tied with long-standing rivals Verona High School, but won more captions than any other band. At the state championship competition in 2007, PHHSMB placed second (out of 17). A week later, the band finished first with a score of 94.85 and took first place in every caption except for color guard. In 2008, PHHSMB finally went an undefeated season for the first time in over 20 years, winning both titles of State Champions and Northern States Champions. In 2016, PHHSMB won the Tournament of Bands Region 10 NY Metropolitan Area regional championship, with their show, Valhalla.

== Athletics ==
The Parsippany Hills High School Vikings participate in the Northwest Jersey Athletic Conference, which is comprised of public and private high schools in Morris, Sussex and Warren counties, and was established by the New Jersey State Interscholastic Athletic Association (NJSIAA) following a reorganization of sports leagues in Northern New Jersey. Prior to the NJSIAA's 2010 realignment, the school had competed as part of the Iron Hills Conference, which included public and private high schools in Essex, Morris and Union counties. With 788 students in grades 10–12, the school was classified by the NJSIAA for the 2019–20 school year as Group III for most athletic competition purposes, which included schools with an enrollment of 761 to 1,058 students in that grade range. The football team competes in the Patriot White division of the North Jersey Super Football Conference, which includes 112 schools competing in 20 divisions, making it the nation's biggest football-only high school sports league. The school was classified by the NJSIAA as Group II North for football for 2024–2026, which included schools with 484 to 683 students.

Sports offered at Parsippany Hills include tennis, football, soccer, cross country running, field hockey, volleyball and cheerleading in the fall; swimming, basketball, ice hockey, wrestling, track and cheerleading in the winter; and baseball, softball, tennis and golf in the spring. The school's colors are black, Columbia blue and white.

The school participates as the host school / lead agency in a joint ice hockey team with Parsippany High School. The co-op program operates under agreements scheduled to expire at the end of the 2023–24 school year.

Parsippany Hills High School's primary rivals are Parsippany High School and in football, Wayne Hills High School. Rivalries have also been seen between the Vikings and Morris Hills High School and Morris Knolls High School during crucial football, basketball, and baseball games. Hanover Park High School is Parsippany Hills' rival in wrestling.

The boys cross country running team won the Group IV state championship in 1972 (as co-champion) and won the Group III title in 1974.

The softball team won the Group III state title in 1981 and 1982, defeating Cherokee High School both years in the final game of the playoff tournament. The 1981 team finished the season with a 27–0 record after winning the Group III title with a 4–2 win against Cherokee in the playoff finals. The 1982 team won the program's second consecutive Group III championship with a 3-1 one-hitter at Mercer County Park against Cherokee to finish the season 22–1. NJ.com / The Star-Ledger ranked Parsippany Hills as their number-one softball team in the state in both 1981 and 1982.

The boys swimming team won the Division B state championship in 1983.

The ice hockey team won the Haas Cup in 2002.

The 2007 boys' soccer team won the North II, Group III state sectional championship. In the semi-finals the team defeated heavy favorite Millburn High School by a score of 4–0 in Millburn to advance to the championship round. Then the team defeated West Morris Mendham High School with a 2–1 overtime win over to win the championship.

In 2007, the competition cheerleading squad captured the American National Championship in a competition in Baltimore, Maryland.

The football team won the North II Group III state championship in 2014 and 2019. After four losses in the championship game of a sectional round, the 2014 team defeated Cranford High School by a score of 20–13 in the tournament final to win the school's first sectional title. The team won the 2019 North II Group III title with a 28–21 win against West Essex High School in the playoff final.

The girls' soccer team won the Group II state sectional championship in 2016 (defeating Haddonfield Memorial High School in the finals) and 2019 (vs. Wall High School). The team beat Haddonfield by a score of 1–0 in the 2016 championship game, earning the program's first state title. The 2019 team finished the season with a 16-6-4 record after winning the Group II title with a 1–0 win against Wall High School on a goal scored late in the second overtime period of the championship game played at Kean University.

Parsippany Hills does not support random drug testing of participants in extracurricular activities.

== Extracurricular activities ==
Parsippany Hills offers many after-school activities, from Academic Decathlon, Junior State of America, FCCLA, DECA, Key Club, Habitat for Humanity to FBLA, along with a steering committee for each grade, which functions as a smaller student council for that grade along with two faculty advisors. Other clubs include the Peerleaders' Activities Council, Interact Club, Animal Lovers Club, Garden Club, Math Team, ERASE Club, Green Team, Computer Science Club, National English Honor Society, Space Club, and the Yearbook Club (Aegis). Parsippany Hills also has National Honor Society, National Art Honor Society, Tri-M Music Honor Society, and International Thespian Society chapters.

== Administration ==
The school's principal is Matthew Thompson. His core administration team includes three assistant principals.

== Notable alumni ==
- Beng Climaco (born 1966), Filipino politician who has served as the mayor of Zamboanga City in Mindanao, Philippines.
- R. J. Cobbs (born 1982), former defensive back for the New York Giants
- Darron Collins (born 1970), human ecologist and academic administrator specializing in ethnobotany, who became president of the College of the Atlantic in 2011
- Dillon Danis, professional mixed martial artist who competes in the Welterweight division of Bellator MMA
- Michael Dogbe (born 1996), defensive end who played for the Arizona Cardinals
- Johnnie Morant (born 1981), former wide receiver for the Oakland Raiders
- Joe Orsulak (born 1962), a Major League Baseball player from 1983 to 1997
- Nimesh Patel (born 1986), American comedian and television writer
- Chris Singleton (born 1967), linebacker who played in the NFL for the New England Patriots and the Miami Dolphins
- UmaSofia Srivastava, beauty pageant titleholder who won Miss Teen USA 2023
