= Parsippany–Troy Hills School District =

School district in Morris County, New Jersey, US

Parsippany-Troy Hills School District

Address
- 292 Parsippany Road Parsippany–Troy Hills, Morris County, New Jersey, 07054; United States
- Coordinates: 40.8566°N 74.426853°W

District information
- Motto: "Education Today, Success Tomorrow"
- Grades: PreK-12
- Superintendent: Karen Chase
- Business administrator: Steven Robinson
- Schools: 14
- NCES District ID: 3412480

Students and staff
- Enrollment: 7,082 (as of 2024–25)
- Faculty: 643.26 FTEs
- Student–teacher ratio: 11.01:1

Other information
- District Factor Group: GH
- Website: www.pthsd.k12.nj.us
Ind.	Per pupil	District spending	Rank (*)	K-12 average	%± vs. average
1A	Total Spending	$19,251	66	$18,891	1.9%
1	Budgetary Cost	15,310	66	14,783	3.6%
2	Classroom Instruction	9,168	72	8,763	4.6%
6	Support Services	2,793	83	2,392	16.8%
8	Administrative Cost	1,382	39	1,485	−6.9%
10	Operations & Maintenance	1,559	43	1,783	−12.6%
13	Extracurricular Activities	360	93	268	34.3%
16	Median Teacher Salary	67,185	64	64,043
Data from NJDoE 2014 Taxpayers' Guide to Education Spending. *Of K-12 districts with more than 3,500 students. Lowest spending=1; Highest=103

The Parsippany–Troy Hills School District is a comprehensive community public school district serving students in pre-kindergarten through twelfth grade from Parsippany–Troy Hills in Morris County, in the U.S. state of New Jersey. The Parsippany Troy-Hills School District serves students in ten elementary schools, two middle schools, two high schools and an adult education center. The community served by the district is ethnically, culturally and linguistically diverse.

As of the 2024–2025 school year, the district, comprising 14 schools, had an enrollment of 7,082 students and 643.26 classroom teachers (on an FTE basis), for a student–teacher ratio of 11.01:1.

The district is classified by the New Jersey Department of Education as being in District Factor Group "GH", the third-highest of eight groupings. District Factor Groups organize districts statewide to allow comparison by common socioeconomic characteristics of the local districts. From lowest socioeconomic status to highest, the categories are A, B, CD, DE, FG, GH, I and J.

== Schools ==
Schools in the district (with 2021–22 enrollment data from the National Center for Education Statistics) are:

Elementary schools

- Eastlake Elementary School (359 students; in grades PreK-5)
  - Sebastian Powell, Principal
- Intervale Elementary School (255; K-5)
  - Christopher Waack, Principal
- Knollwood Elementary School (380; K-5)
  - Steven Linzenbold, Principal
- Lake Hiawatha Elementary School (417; PreK-5)
  - Steve Figurelli, Principal
- Lake Parsippany Elementary School (271; K-5)
  - Michele Hoffman, Principal
- Littleton Elementary School (422; K-5)
  - Brian Staples, Principal
- Mount Tabor Elementary School (354; K-5)
  - Marlene Toomey, Principal
- Northvail Elementary School (383; K-5)
  - Natalie Betz, Principal
- Rockaway Meadow Elementary School (258; K-5)
  - Michael DiSanto, Principal
- Troy Hills Elementary School (290; K-5)
  - Keith Cortright, Principal
- Brooklawn Middle School (898; 6-8)
  - Carly Stout, Principal
- Central Middle School (807; 6-8)
  - Mark Gray, Principal

High schools

- Parsippany High School (898; 9-12)
  - Melissa Carucci, Principal
- Parsippany Hills High School (1,028; 9-12)
  - Matthew Thompson, Principal

== Administration ==
Core members of the district's administration are:

- Karen Chase, Superintendent.
- Steven Robinson, Interim business administrator / board secretary

== Board of education ==
The district's board of education, composed of nine members, sets policy and oversees the fiscal and educational operation of the district through its administration. As a Type II school district, the board's trustees are elected directly by voters to serve three-year terms of office on a staggered basis, with three seats up for election each year held (since 2012) as part of the November general election. The board appoints a superintendent to oversee the district's day-to-day operations and a business administrator to supervise the business functions of the district.
