= Rainbow Lakes, New Jersey =

Populated place in Morris County, New Jersey, US

- Census-designated place
- Location in Morris County Location in New Jersey Location in the United States
- Coordinates: 40°52′31″N 74°27′8″W
- Country: United States
- State: New Jersey
- County: Morris
- Township: Parsippany–Troy Hills

Area
  - Total: 1.20 sq mi (3.11 km^{2})
  - Land: 1.10 sq mi (2.84 km^{2})
  - Water: 0.10 sq mi (0.27 km^{2})
- Elevation: 520 ft (160 m)

Population (2020)
  - Total: 1,255
  - Density: 1,144.4/sq mi (441.87/km^{2})
- Time zone: UTC−05:00 (Eastern (EST))
  - Summer (DST): UTC−04:00 (EDT)
- ZIP Codes: 07054 (Parsippany); 07834 (Denville)
- Area codes: 973/862
- FIPS code: 34-61560
- GNIS feature ID: 2806173

Rainbow Lakes is a census-designated place (CDP) located in Parsippany–Troy Hills Township, Morris County, New Jersey, United States. It is in the western part of the township and consists of housing built around a cluster of lakes including Rainbow Lake, plus a zone of commercial buildings to the east of the lakes. As of the 2020 census, the population of the CDP was 1,255.

== Geography ==
Rainbow Lakes is in eastern Morris County and is bordered to the east by the Parsippany CDP, to the north by the borough of Mountain Lakes, and to the west by Denville Township. The northern edge of the CDP is formed by U.S. Route 46 and the NJ Transit Montclair-Boonton Line, and Interstate 80 forms the southern edge. It is 21 miles (34 km) northwest of Newark and 30 miles (48 km) west of the George Washington Bridge over the Hudson River.

According to the U.S. Census Bureau, the Rainbow Lakes CDP has a total area of 1.20 square miles (3.11 km^{2}), of which 1.10 square miles (2.85 km^{2}) are land and 0.10 square miles (0.26 km^{2}), or 8.51%, are water. The lakes for which the community is named include Rainbow Lake, Upper Rainbow Lake, Mirror Lake, Twilight Lake, Cabin Lake, and Fern Lake.

== Demographics ==
Historical population
Census	Pop.	Note	%±
2020	1,255		—
U.S. Decennial Census; 2020

Rainbow Lakes was first listed as a census designated place in the 2020 U.S. census.

Rainbow Lakes CDP, New Jersey – Racial and ethnic composition Note: the US Census treats Hispanic/Latino as an ethnic category. This table excludes Latinos from the racial categories and assigns them to a separate category. Hispanics/Latinos may be of any race.
Race / Ethnicity (NH = Non-Hispanic)	Pop 2020	2020
White alone (NH)	740	58.96%
Black or African American alone (NH)	14	1.12%
Native American or Alaska Native alone (NH)	1	0.08%
Asian alone (NH)	258	20.56%
Native Hawaiian or Pacific Islander alone (NH)	0	0.00%
Other race alone (NH)	18	1.43%
Mixed race or Multiracial (NH)	30	2.39%
Hispanic or Latino (any race)	194	15.46%
Total	1,255	100.00%
