= Nimesh Patel =

American comedian and writer (born 1986)

- Born: Nimesh Patel; 1986 (age 39–40); Parsippany, New Jersey, U.S.
- Education: New York University (B.S.)
- Occupations: Stand-up comedian; television writer
- Years active: 2009–present
- Children: 1

Nimesh S. Patel (born 1986) is an American comedian and television writer. In 2017, he became the first Indian-American writer on Saturday Night Live.

== Early life and education ==
Nimesh Patel was born in 1986 to an Indian Gujarati Hindu family in Parsippany–Troy Hills in New Jersey. His parents immigrated to the United States from India in the 1970s. His father first came to Newark, New Jersey, as a 17-year-old and worked as a cashier at a Macy's. He eventually opened a liquor store in a troubled neighborhood with heavy African-American organized crime and gang culture in Irvington, New Jersey, where he was often robbed and also shot at.

Patel graduated from Parsippany Hills High School in 2004. He then moved to New York City to attend New York University, initially as a pre-med student. He has lived in the city ever since. He graduated with a degree in finance in 2008.

== Career ==
After graduating during the 2008 financial crisis, Patel began working during the day and performing stand-up comedy at The Stress Factory at night.

In 2015, he was doing standup in Greenpoint, Brooklyn, when he was discovered by Chris Rock. Patel then joined Rock's writing team for the 88th Academy Awards ceremony.

In 2016, he was a finalist in Kevin Hart's Laugh Out Loud Network Pitch Panel at Just for Laughs ComedyPRO.

Patel also wrote material for Hasan Minhaj's 2017 White House Correspondents' Association Dinner appearance. In 2017, he began working as a full-time writer for Saturday Night Live, mainly writing jokes for Weekend Update. In 2018, Patel was nominated for an Emmy Award for Outstanding Writing for his work on SNL. He worked for SNL for just one season.

Patel has appeared on @midnight, Comedy Knockout and Late Night with Seth Meyers. He has also featured as a comedy and politics panelist at the Foreign Affairs Symposium at Johns Hopkins University.

Patel was invited to perform a comedy set hosted by the Asian American Alliance student organization at Columbia University on November 30, 2018. Mid-way through the set, Patel was interrupted and asked to leave by the organizers, who found his material offensive. The incident led to Patel's penning an editorial in the New York Times.

Patel was scheduled to participate in the 2025 Riyadh Comedy Festival, which received negative attention from organizations such as Human Rights Watch; Patel pulled before the start of the festival after "having a change of heart". Later that year, he provided the voice of Galen in the video game Dispatch.

== Influences ==
Patel's main comedic influences are Dave Chappelle, Mitch Hedberg, Chris Rock, Larry David and Patrice O’Neal.

== Personal life ==
Patel is a non practicing Hindu.

He used to live in Hell's Kitchen in New York City but now resides in Brooklyn. He is a regular comic at the Comedy Cellar, a comedy club in Greenwich Village in New York City.

== Awards and honors ==
- 2017 - Nominated for Writers Guild of America Award for Comedy/Variety (Music, Awards, Tributes) – Specials for the 88th Academy Awards
- 2018 - Nominated for Primetime Emmy Award for Outstanding Writing for a Variety Series for Saturday Night Live
