= Parsippany (CDP), New Jersey =

Populated place in Morris County, New Jersey, US

Parsippany, New Jersey
- Census-designated place
- Location in Morris County Location in New Jersey Location in the United States
- Coordinates: 40°51′26″N 74°25′37″W
- Country: United States
- State: New Jersey
- County: Morris
- Township: Parsippany-Troy Hills

Area
  - Total: 6.87 sq mi (17.79 km^{2})
  - Land: 6.08 sq mi (15.76 km^{2})
  - Water: 0.78 sq mi (2.03 km^{2})
- Elevation: 330 ft (100 m)

Population (2020)
  - Total: 22,778
  - Density: 3,742.5/sq mi (1,444.97/km^{2})
- Time zone: UTC−05:00 (Eastern (EST))
  - Summer (DST): UTC−04:00 (EDT)
- ZIP Code: 07054
- Area codes: 973/862
- FIPS code: 34-56430
- GNIS feature ID: 2806163

Parsippany is a census-designated place (CDP) and the central community in the township of Parsippany–Troy Hills, Morris County, in the U.S. state of New Jersey. As of the 2020 United States census, the population was 22,778, out of 56,162 in the entire township. It includes development around Lake Parsippany, as well as neighborhoods in the eastern part of the township, between Troy Hills to the south and Lake Hiawatha to the northeast. The southern end of Boonton Reservoir is also in the CDP. In common usage, "Parsippany" usually applies to the entire township.

== Geography ==
The Parsippany CDP is bordered to the south and east by Troy Hills, to the northeast by Lake Hiawatha, and to the west by Rainbow Lakes, all in Parsippany-Troy Hills Township. It is also bordered by the borough of Mountain Lakes to the northwest and by Whippany in Hanover Township to the south.

Interstate 80 and Interstate 287 intersect in the center of the CDP. I-80 leads east 24 miles (39 km) to its terminus at Interstate 95 in Teaneck and west 46 miles (74 km) to the Delaware Water Gap, while I-287 leads northeast 25 miles (40 km) to Suffern, New York, and southwest 26 miles (42 km) to Somerville. U.S. Route 202 passes through the center and western parts of the CDP, leading north 3 miles (5 km) to Boonton and southwest 5 miles (8 km) to Morris Plains. U.S. Route 46 also passes through the center of the CDP, leading east 4 miles (6 km) to Pine Brook and northwest 5 miles (8 km) to Rockaway.

According to the U.S. Census Bureau, the Parsippany CDP has a total area of 6.87 square miles (17.79 km^{2}), of which 6.09 square miles (15.77 km^{2}) are land and 0.78 square miles (2.02 km^{2}), or 11.41%, are water. Boonton Reservoir, in the north part of the CDP, drains north into the Rockaway River near Boonton. Lake Parsippany is in the southwest part of the CDP and drains southeast into Eastmans Brook. The entire CDP is within the watershed of the Passaic River.

== Demographics ==
Historical population
Census	Pop.	Note	%±
2020	22,778		—
U.S. Decennial Census 2020 2020

Parsippany was first listed as a census designated place in the 2020 U.S. census.

Parsippany CDP, New Jersey – Racial and ethnic composition Note: the US Census treats Hispanic/Latino as an ethnic category. This table excludes Latinos from the racial categories and assigns them to a separate category. Hispanics/Latinos may be of any race.
Race / Ethnicity (NH = Non-Hispanic)	Pop 2020	2020
White alone (NH)	8,784	38.56%
Black or African American alone (NH)	683	3.00%
Native American or Alaska Native alone (NH)	36	0.16%
Asian alone (NH)	10,273	45.10%
Native Hawaiian or Pacific Islander alone (NH)	1	0.00%
Other race alone (NH)	131	0.58%
Mixed race or Multiracial (NH)	566	2.48%
Hispanic or Latino (any race)	2,304	10.12%
Total	22,778	100.00%
