= Parsippany High School =

High school in Morris County, New Jersey, US

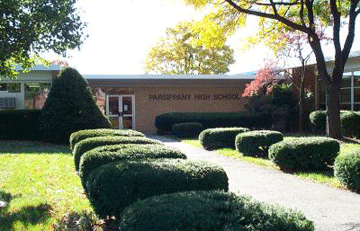

Location
- 309 Baldwin Road; Parsippany-Troy Hills, Morris County, New Jersey 07054; United States; 40.868506°N 74.394327°W

Information
- Type: Public high school
- Established: 1957
- School district: Parsippany-Troy Hills School District
- NCES School ID: 341248004430
- Principal: Melissa Carucci
- Faculty: 93.45 FTEs
- Grades: 9-12
- Enrollment: 900 (as of 2024–25)
- Student to teacher ratio: 9.63:1
- Colors: Red and Gray
- Athletics conference: Northwest Jersey Athletic Conference (general); North Jersey Super Football Conference (football)
- Team name: Redskins (1957-2001); Redhawks (2001-present)
- Rival: Parsippany Hills High School
- Publication: Totem (literary magazine)
- Newspaper: The Drumbeat
- Website: phs.pthsd.k12.nj.us

Parsippany High School (also known as PHS) is a four-year comprehensive public high school, one of two high schools in Parsippany-Troy Hills, in Morris County, in the U.S. state of New Jersey, operating as part of the Parsippany-Troy Hills School District. The school serves students in ninth through twelfth grades who live in the eastern half of Parsippany-Troy Hills. Its companion school in the district is Parsippany Hills High School.

As of the 2024–25 school year, the school had an enrollment of 900 students and 93.45 classroom teachers (on an FTE basis), for a student–teacher ratio of 9.63:1. There were 190 students (21.1% of enrollment) eligible for free lunch and 44 (4.89% of students) eligible for reduced-cost lunch.

Enrollment Characteristics (2024-2025 school year)

Enrollment by Grade:

	9	10	11	12
Students	209	251	226	214

Enrollment by Gender:

	Male	Female
Students	465	435

Enrollment by Race/Ethnicity:

	American Indian/ Alaska Native	Asian	Black	Hispanic	White	Native Hawaiian/ Pacific Islander	Two or More Races
Students	0	341	32	193	304	1	29

Free lunch eligible^{1}: 190 Reduced-price lunch eligible^{1}: 44

Free and reduced-price lunch eligible total^{1}: 234 Free lunch eligible by Direct Certification^{2}: –

Note: Details may not add to totals.

== History ==
Before the high school opened for the 1957-58 school year, students from the township attended Boonton High School, as part of a sending/receiving relationship.

== Awards and recognition ==
The school was the 105th-ranked public high school in New Jersey out of 339 schools statewide in New Jersey Monthly magazine's September 2014 cover story on the state's "Top Public High Schools", using a new ranking methodology. The school had been ranked 86th in the state of 328 schools in 2012, after being ranked 84th in 2010 out of 322 schools listed. The magazine ranked the school 104th in 2008 out of 316 schools. The school was ranked 84th in the magazine's September 2006 issue, which surveyed 316 schools across the state.

== Athletics ==
The Parsippany High School Red Hawks participate in the Northwest Jersey Athletic Conference, which is comprised of public and private high schools covering Morris, Sussex and Warren counties, and was established by the New Jersey State Interscholastic Athletic Association (NJSIAA) following a reorganization of sports leagues in Northern New Jersey. Prior to the NJSIAA's 2010 realignment, the school had competed as part of the Iron Hills Conference, which included public and private high schools in Essex, Morris and Union counties. With 672 students in grades 10-12, the school was classified by the NJSIAA for the 2019–20 school year as Group II for most athletic competition purposes, which included schools with an enrollment of 486 to 758 students in that grade range. The football team competes in the American Blue division of the North Jersey Super Football Conference, which includes 112 schools competing in 20 divisions, making it the nation's biggest football-only high school sports league. The school was classified by the NJSIAA as Group III North for football for 2024–2026, which included schools with 700 to 884 students.

Interscholastic sports and activities offered at Parsippany High include football, soccer, cross-country running, marching band, field hockey, volleyball and cheerleading in the fall, swimming, basketball, ice hockey, wrestling, track and cheerleading in the winter, and baseball, softball, track, tennis and golf in the spring. Michael DiBernard is the Athletic Director.

The school's mascot had been a caricature of a Native American and the school's athletic teams were referred to as the Redskins. In response to concerns that the mascot was a racist caricature, the official mascot was changed to that of a Redhawk in 2001, based on student body nominations.

The school participates in a joint ice hockey team in which Parsippany Hills High School is the host school / lead agency. The co-op program operates under agreements scheduled to expire at the end of the 2023–24 school year.

The boys cross country running team won the Group III state championship in 1982.

The 1986 softball team finished the season 27-3 after winning the Group III state title by defeating Central Regional High School by a score of 6-0 in the championship game at Trenton State College. NJ.com / The Star-Ledger ranked Parsippany as their number-one softball team in the state in 1986.

The boys' basketball team won the Group III state championship in 1999, after coming back from five point deficit in the final minute of the game to defeat Lawrence High School by a score of 57-55 in the final game of the tournament` and advanced to the Tournament of Champions as the fifth seed, falling in the quarterfinals to fourth-seed Holmdel High School by a score of 77-55 to finish the season with a record of 20-7.

The boys' wrestling team won the North II Group II state sectional title in 1999 and 2000, and won the North I Group II title in 2009. The team won the 2000 North II, Group III with a 29-26 win over Rahway High School in the tournament final.

The girls' track team won the indoor track Group II state championship in 2004 (as co-champion).

The girls' outdoor track and field team won the Group II state championship in 2006.

The school's marching band won the USBands Group IV A National & NJ State Championships in 2015 with their program Cloud 9.

== Administration ==
The school's principal is Melissa Carucci. Her administration team includes three assistant principals.

== Notable alumni ==
- Charles (Charlie) Ayers (born 1966, class of 1985), former executive chef for Google
- Clarence Curry (born 1981, Class of 2000), played for the Arizona Cardinals of the NFL in 2004 and 2005
- Jane Krakowski (born 1968), Golden Globe award-winning actress best known for her roles on 30 Rock and Ally McBeal
- Steve Krisiloff (born 1946, class of 1965), former driver in the USAC and CART Championship Car series
- George Kurtz (born 1970), co-founder and CEO of cybersecurity company CrowdStrike, who was the founder of Foundstone and chief technology officer of McAfee
- Fei-Fei Li (born 1976, class of 1995), professor of computer science at Stanford University, who is director of the Stanford Artificial Intelligence Lab (SAIL) and the Stanford Vision Lab
- Mike Maksudian (born 1966), former Major League Baseball player
- Paul Mirabella (born 1954), former Major League Baseball player
- Garrett Reisman (born 1968), former NASA astronaut, SpaceX engineer and executive, and currently a Professor of Human Space Flight at the University of Southern California
- Dean Steward (1923–1979), football player in the National Football League for the Steagles, a temporary World War II merger of the Philadelphia Eagles and Pittsburgh Steelers
- Richie Zisk (born 1949), former Major League Baseball player
