= Phebe Ann Jacobs =

American Congregationalist, laundress, and free woman (1785–1850)

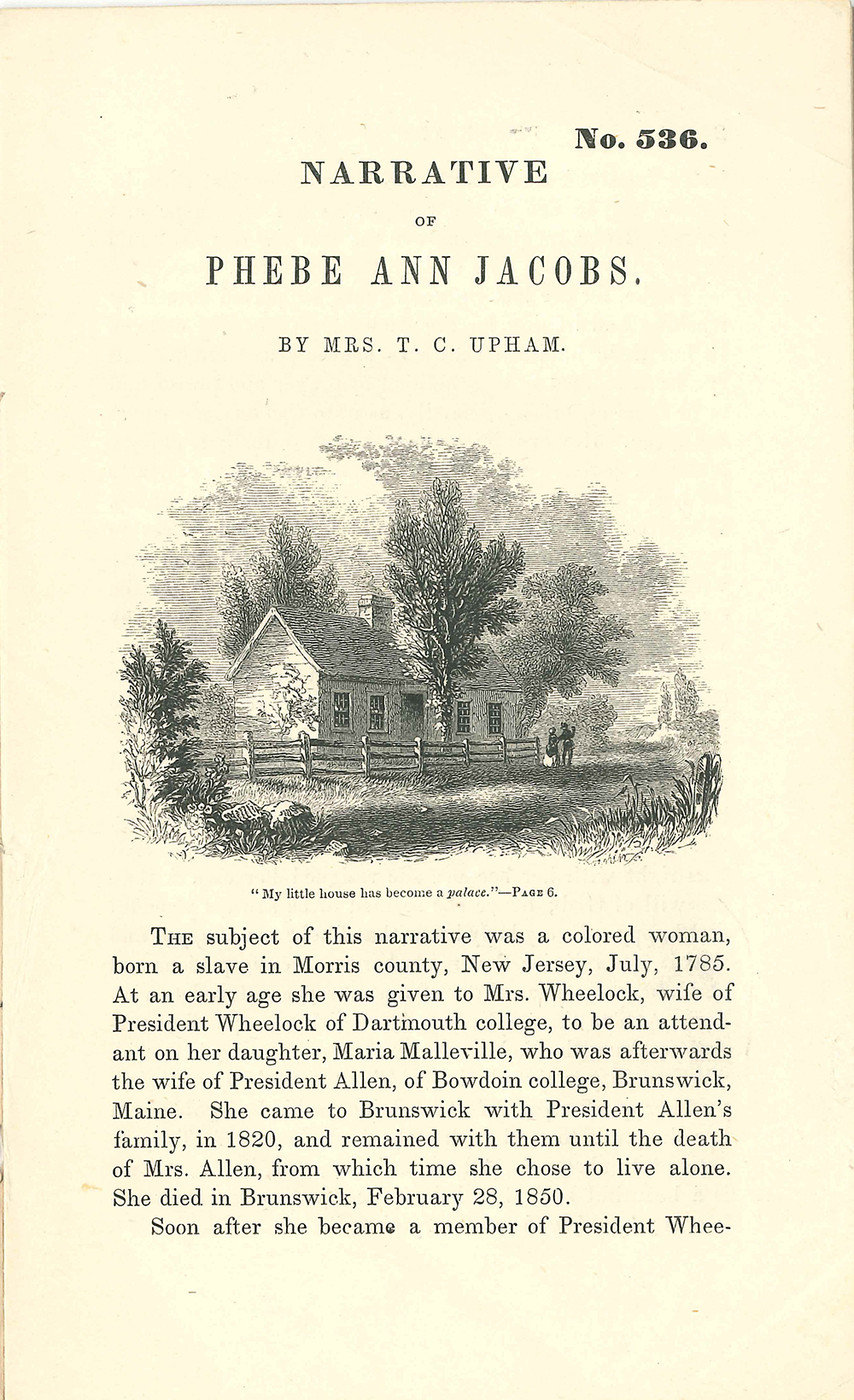
- The first page of Narrative of Phebe Ann Jacobs
- Born: July 1785; Hanover Township, New Jersey, U.S. (later Lake Hiawatha, New Jersey)
- Died: February 28, 1850 (aged 64); Brunswick, Maine, U.S.

Phebe Ann Jacobs (July 1785 – February 28, 1850) was an American Congregationalist, laundress, and free woman. Best known for her posthumous biography Narrative of Phebe Ann Jacobs, Jacobs was born into slavery on the Beverwyck plantation in Lake Hiawatha, New Jersey.

During her life, she was enslaved by the family of the President of Dartmouth, then the President of Bowdoin College in Brunswick, Maine. In the final years of her life, she achieved emancipation and worked in Brunswick laundering clothes for students of Bowdoin.

In 1919, the New Jersey Historical Society claimed Jacobs was significant for "her rare attainments as a Christian, the strength of her faith, and her spirit of devotion."

== Life ==
=== Early life and slavery ===
Jacobs was born a slave on the Beverwyck plantation in Lake Hiawatha, New Jersey, in 1785. Jacobs did not receive an education; she was instead trained to become a domestic slave. She had a sister named Peggy, who different persons presumably owned. Her parents' names are not stated in sources.

When Jacobs was a child, she was owned by Maria Malleville, daughter of President Wheelock of Dartmouth college. Maria Malleville was born on February 3, 1788; Malleville was three years younger than Jacobs.

On January 28, 1813, Maria Malleville married William Allen, president of Bowdoin College in Brunswick, Maine. Jacobs was 28 years old and continued to be owned by the Allens after they moved to their new home in Pittsfield, Maine.

Although some sources indicate Jacobs became free in Maine, her emancipation status was complicated. According to Professor of History James J. Gigantino II of the University of Arkansas, "Like many free blacks, [Jacobs] continued to serve her former owners as a domestic servant since, while free, she faced racism and a lack of economic opportunities."

=== Later years ===
Likely due to indentured servitude, Jacobs remained with the family until the death of her owner, Maria Allen.

For the last years of her life, Jacobs lived independently, washing and ironing clothes for students of Bowdoin. She lived in Pine Grove in a small cabin on a blueberry plain, now an airport site.

Shortly before 1850, Jacobs met Phebe Lord Upham, possibly because they both attended First Parish Church. Upham was a theologian, poet, and social activist best known for The Crystal Fountain (1887). A native of Kennebunkport, Upham married Bowdoin professor T. C. Upham. Around this time, Upham may have begun writing Jacobs's biography. Some sources describe the narrative as dictated, so it can be assumed that Jacobs was telling Upham her life stories to be recorded.

Jacobs died in Brunswick, on February 28, 1850, of an unspecified heart condition.

== Legacy ==
Jacobs's 1850 funeral was reported to have a significant amount of attendees. The Times Record reports, "At [Jacobs's] funeral, the [First Parish Church] was packed with people wanting to honor their beloved fellow citizen. Maine Gov. Robert Pinckney Dunlap served as one of the pallbearers. In fact, one person noted that Phoebe [sic] Ann Jacobs had as many people at her funeral as Joshua Chamberlain had."

Among the funeral's attendees were Allen and his family - relatives of Jacobs's enslaver Maria Allen - who were informed via telegraph. The Allens traveled over 200 miles to attend Jacobs's funeral.

In 1850, after Jacobs's death, Upham completed a pamphlet describing Jacobs's life, titled Narrative of Phebe Ann Jacobs, also called Happy Phebe. It was published in 1850 by W. & F. G. Cash in London. On September 25, 1850, the story was published in Volume VII of The Oberlin Evangelist, edited by Henry Cowles. In 1850, it was also published by the American Tract Society of New York and republished in 1854. According to Bowdoin College, the biography "documents Jacobs’ life after emancipation and emphasizes her piety and reliance on her Christian faith...[but] does not, however, document the laborious nature of being enslaved to the Wheelock family."

In 1854, Edinburgh catechism book The Shorter Catechism...with Proofs from the Scriptures advertised Jacobs's narrative in a collection of pamphlets for school use. This advertisement was for Johnstone & Hunter's Miniature Series of Interesting Narratives. Jacobs's narrative was sold in a pack of three pamphlets along with "John Rock, the Miner" and "Sabbath-School Fruit and a Death Song."

Circa 1850, Jacobs's biography inspired author Harriet Beecher Stowe as she wrote 1852 anti-slavery novel Uncle Tom's Cabin.

In 2010, Jacobs was added to the Brunswick Women's History Walking Trail alongside American Arctic explorer Miriam MacMillan, milliner Dolly Giddings, botanist and artist Catherine Furbish, St. John's teacher Sister Pauline Langelier, restaurateur Pauline Siatras, and abolitionist author Harriet Beecher Stowe.

In 2021, Jacobs's narrative was included in Bowdoin's There Is a Woman in Every Color: Black Women in Art exhibition as part of Black history month.

== See also ==
- Congregationalism in the United States
- Religion of Black Americans
- List of enslaved people
