= Cedar Glen Lakes, New Jersey =

Populated place in Ocean County, New Jersey, US

- Census-designated place
- Map of Cedar Glen Lakes CDP in Ocean County. Inset: Location of Ocean County in New Jersey.

- Location in Ocean County Location in New Jersey Location in the United States
- Coordinates: 39.953737°N 74.400284°W
- Country: United States
- State: New Jersey
- County: Ocean
- Township: Manchester

Area
  - Total: 0.70 sq mi (1.81 km^{2})
  - Land: 0.69 sq mi (1.80 km^{2})
  - Water: 0.0077 sq mi (0.02 km^{2}) 0.83%
- Elevation: 148 ft (45 m)

Population (2020)
  - Total: 1,517
  - Density: 2,184.5/sq mi (843.43/km^{2})
- Time zone: UTC−05:00 (Eastern (EST))
  - Summer (DST): UTC−04:00 (Eastern (EDT))
- FIPS code: 34-11140
- GNIS feature ID: 02389291

Cedar Glen Lakes is an unincorporated community and census-designated place (CDP) located within Manchester Township, in Ocean County, in the U.S. state of New Jersey. As of the 2020 census, Cedar Glen Lakes had a population of 1,517.

== Geography ==
According to the United States Census Bureau, the CDP had a total area of 0.699 square miles (1.81 km^{2}), including 0.693 square miles (1.79 km^{2}) of land and 0.006 square miles (0.016 km^{2}) of water (0.83%).

== Demographics ==
Historical population
Census	Pop.	Note	%±
1980	1,987		—
1990	1,611		−18.9%
2000	1,617		0.4%
2010	1,421		−12.1%
2020	1,517		6.8%
Population sources: 1950 1960 1970; 1980 1990 2000; 2010 2020

Cedar Glen lakes first appeared as a census designated place in the 1980 U.S. census.

=== 2020 census ===
Cedar Glen Lakes CDP, New Jersey – Racial and ethnic composition Note: the US Census treats Hispanic/Latino as an ethnic category. This table excludes Latinos from the racial categories and assigns them to a separate category. Hispanics/Latinos may be of any race.
Race / Ethnicity (NH = Non-Hispanic)	Pop 2000	Pop 2010	Pop 2020	% 2000	% 2010	% 2020
White alone (NH)	1,575	1,373	1,384	97.40%	96.62%	91.23%
Black or African American alone (NH)	11	9	13	0.68%	0.63%	0.86%
Native American or Alaska Native alone (NH)	1	0	6	0.06%	0.00%	0.40%
Asian alone (NH)	7	8	18	0.43%	0.56%	1.19%
Native Hawaiian or Pacific Islander alone (NH)	0	0	1	0.00%	0.00%	0.07%
Other race alone (NH)	0	0	0	0.00%	0.00%	0.00%
Mixed race or Multiracial (NH)	2	6	23	0.12%	0.42%	1.52%
Hispanic or Latino (any race)	21	25	72	1.30%	1.76%	4.75%
Total	1,617	1,421	1,517	100.00%	100.00%	100.00%

=== 2010 census ===
The 2010 United States census counted 1,421 people, 1,008 households, and 356 families in the CDP. The population density was 2,050.4 people per square mile (791.7 people/km^{2}). There were 1,234 housing units at an average density of 1,780.6 units per square mile (687.5 units/km^{2}). The racial makeup was 98.03% (1,393) White, 0.63% (9) Black or African American, 0.00% (0) Native American, 0.56% (8) Asian, 0.00% (0) Pacific Islander, 0.35% (5) from other races, and 0.42% (6) from two or more races. Hispanic or Latino of any race were 1.76% (25) of the population.

Of the 1,008 households, 0.1% had children under the age of 18; 29.2% were married couples living together; 5.4% had a female householder with no husband present and 64.7% were non-families. Of all households, 61.9% were made up of individuals and 53.8% had someone living alone who was 65 years of age or older. The average household size was 1.41 and the average family size was 2.07.

0.2% of the population were under the age of 18, 0.8% from 18 to 24, 1.8% from 25 to 44, 16.5% from 45 to 64, and 80.7% who were 65 years of age or older. The median age was 74.6 years. For every 100 females, the population had 60.6 males. For every 100 females ages 18 and older there were 60.6 males.

=== 2000 census ===
As of the 2000 United States census there were 1,617 people, 1,126 households, and 451 families living in the CDP. The population density was 931.8 people/km^{2} (2,413 people/mi^{2}). There were 1,242 housing units at an average density of 715.7 units/km^{2} (1,854 units/mi^{2}). The racial makeup of the CDP was 98.52% White, 0.68% African American, 0.06% Native American, 0.43% Asian, 0.19% from other races, and 0.12% from two or more races. Hispanic or Latino of any race were 1.30% of the population.

There were 1,126 households, of which 0.2% had children under the age of 18 living with them, 36.2% were married couples living together, 3.6% had a female householder with no husband present, and 59.9% were non-families. 58.5% of all households were made up of individuals, and 53.3% had someone living alone who was 65 years of age or older. The average household size was 1.44 and the average family size was 2.05.

In the CDP the population was spread out, with 0.2% under the age of 18, 0.1% from 18 to 24, 2.0% from 25 to 44, 15.8% from 45 to 64, and 82.0% who were 65 years of age or older. The median age was 75 years. For every 100 females, there were 58.7 males. For every 100 females age 18 and over, there were 58.7 males.

The median income for a household in the CDP was $20,378, and the median income for a family was $30,278. Males had a median income of $40,368 versus $35,833 for females. The per capita income for the CDP was $20,246. About 1.9% of families and 3.7% of the population were below the poverty line, including none of those under age 18 and 3.1% of those age 65 or over.
