= Manchester Township, New Jersey =

Township in Ocean County, New Jersey, US

- Township
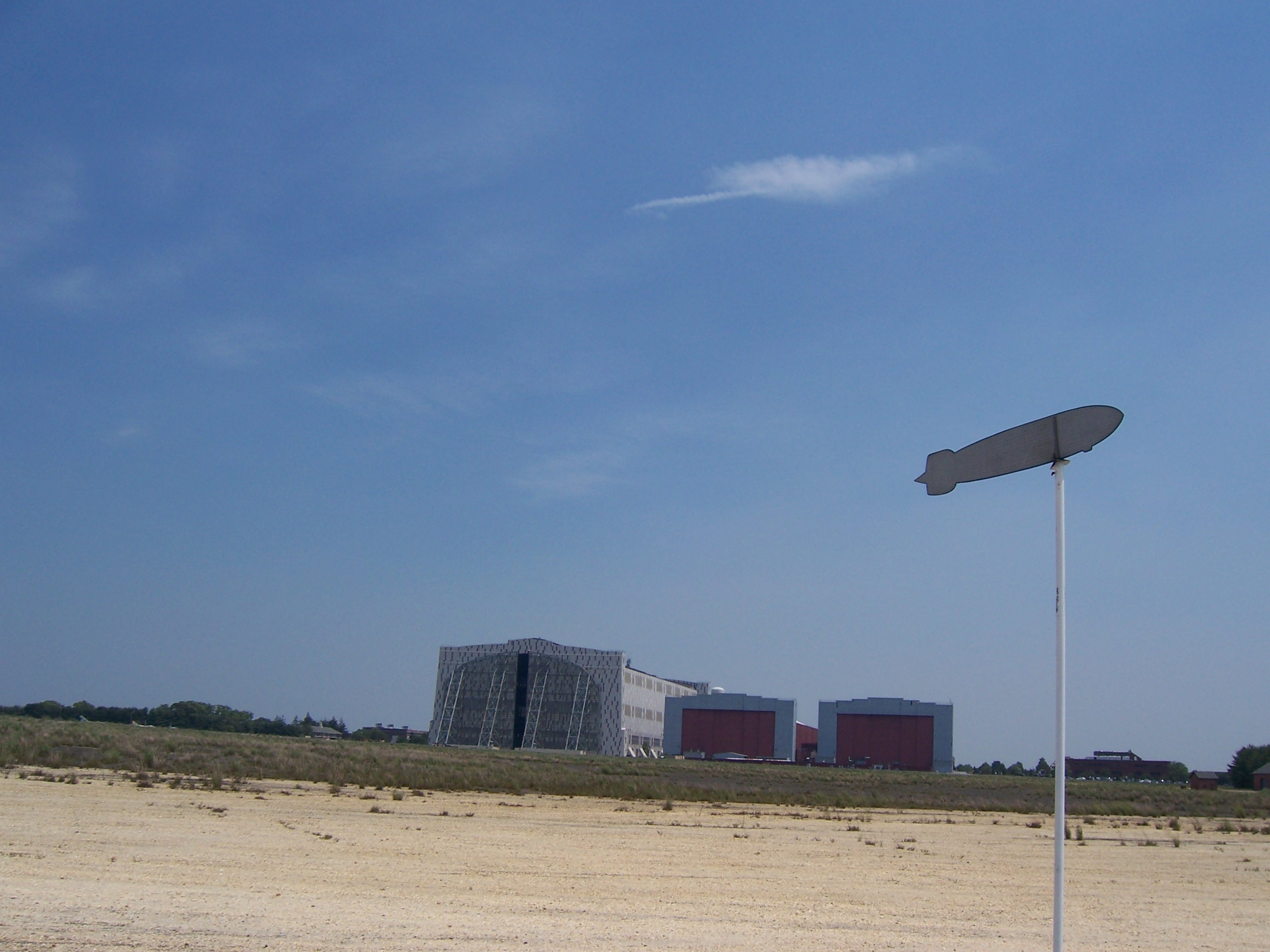
- Historical marker commemorating the site of the Hindenburg disaster in Manchester Township

- Seal
- Nickname: The Great Pine City
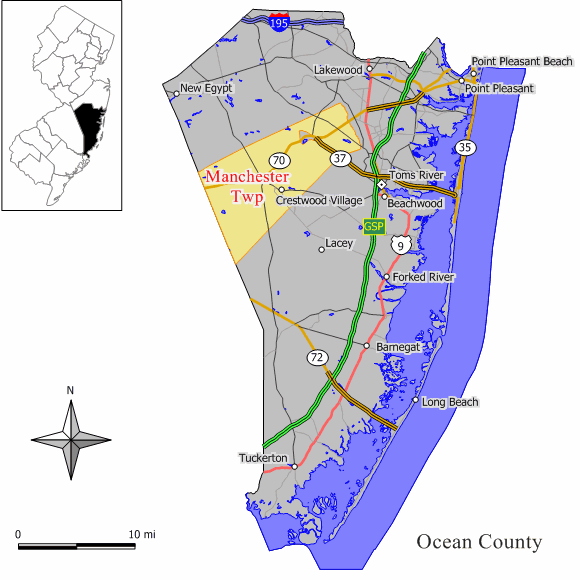
- Location of Manchester Township in Ocean County highlighted in yellow (right). Inset map: Location of Ocean County in New Jersey highlighted in black (left).

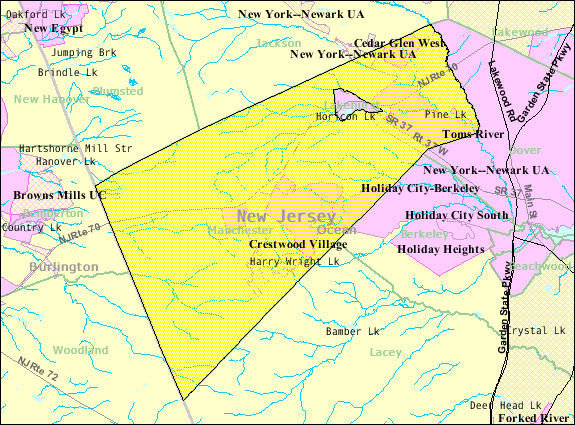
- Census Bureau map of Manchester Township, New Jersey

- Location in Ocean County Location in New Jersey Location in the United States
- Coordinates: 39.961624°N 74.375315°W
- Country: United States
- State: New Jersey
- County: Ocean
- Incorporated: April 6, 1865
- Named for: Manchester, England

Government
  - Type: Faulkner Act (mayor–council)
  - Body: Township Council
  - Mayor: Robert Arace (term ends December 31, 2026)
  - Municipal clerk: Teri Giercyk

Area
  - Total: 82.51 sq mi (213.70 km^{2})
  - Land: 81.42 sq mi (210.87 km^{2})
  - Water: 1.09 sq mi (2.83 km^{2}) 1.32%
  - Rank: 9th of 565 in state 3rd of 33 in county
- Elevation: 154 ft (47 m)

Population (2020)
  - Total: 45,115
  - Estimate (2023): 46,053
  - Rank: 48th of 565 in state 5th of 33 in county
  - Density: 554.1/sq mi (213.9/km^{2})
  - Rank: 436th of 565 in state 28th of 33 in county
- Time zone: UTC−05:00 (Eastern (EST))
  - Summer (DST): UTC−04:00 (Eastern (EDT))
- ZIP Codes: 08733 and 08759
- Area code: 732
- FIPS code: 3402943140
- GNIS feature ID: 0882077
- Website: www.manchestertwp.com

Manchester Township is a township in Ocean County, in the U.S. state of New Jersey. The township is noted for containing the Lakehurst Naval Air Station, the site of the infamous Hindenburg disaster of May 6, 1937. As of the 2020 United States census, the township's population was 45,115, the highest recorded in any decennial count and an increase of 2,045 (+4.7%) from the 2010 census count of 43,070, which in turn reflected an increase of 4,142 (+10.6%) from the 38,928 counted in the 2000 census.

== History ==
Manchester Township was incorporated as a township by an act of the New Jersey Legislature on April 6, 1865, from portions of Dover Township (now Toms River Township). The township was named by William Torrey for Manchester, England. Portions of the township were taken to form Lakehurst on April 7, 1921.

== Geography ==
According to the United States Census Bureau, the township had a total area of 82.51 square miles (213.70 km^{2}), including 81.42 square miles (210.87 km^{2}) of land and 1.09 square miles (2.83 km^{2}) of water (1.32%).

Cedar Glen Lakes (with a 2020 Census population of 1,517), Cedar Glen West (1,379), Crestwood Village (8,426), Leisure Knoll (2,562), Leisure Village West (3,692), Pine Lake Park (8,913) and Pine Ridge at Crestwood (2,537) are all unincorporated communities and census-designated places (CDPs) located within Manchester Township. Leisure Village West-Pine Lake Park had been a combined CDP through the 2000 United States census and was split as of the 2010 enumeration.

Other unincorporated communities, localities and place names located partially or completely within the township include Beckerville, Boyds Hotel, Brainards, Brick Yards, Buckingham, Giberson, Goose Pond, Horican, Keswick Grove, Old Halfway, Pasadena, Pine Lake Park Estates, Ridgeway, Roosevelt City and Whiting. Cedar Glen Lakes, Cedar Glen West, Crestwood Village, Pine Ridge, Fox Hollow, Lakewood Heights, Keswick Grove, Winwood, Timbergreen, and Roosevelt City are all within Whiting which makes up the largest territory in Manchester in geography and demographics with 33,180 out of 45,115 people.

The township borders Berkeley Township, Jackson Township, Lacey Township, Plumsted Township and Toms River Township in Ocean County; and both Pemberton Township and Woodland Township in Burlington County. The township completely surrounds the independent borough of Lakehurst, making it part of 21 pairs of "doughnut towns" in the state, where one municipality entirely surrounds another.

Manchester's largest development, Pine Lake Park, is known for its man-made lake, Pine Lake, built in the 1970s.

The township is one of 11 municipalities in Ocean County that are part of the Toms River watershed.

== Demographics ==
Historical population
Census	Pop.	Note	%±
1870	1,102		—
1880	1,057		−4.1%
1890	1,057		0.0%
1900	1,033		−2.3%
1910	1,112		7.6%
1920	1,034		−7.0%
1930	1,009	*	−2.4%
1940	918		−9.0%
1950	1,758		91.5%
1960	3,779		115.0%
1970	7,550		99.8%
1980	27,987		270.7%
1990	35,976		28.5%
2000	38,928		8.2%
2010	43,070		10.6%
2020	45,115		4.7%
2023 (est.)	46,053		2.1%
Population sources: 1870–2000 1870–1920; 1870 1880–1890; 1890–1910 1910–1930; 1940–2000 2000; 2010 2020 * = Lost territory in previous decade.

=== 2020 census ===
The 2020 United States census counted 45,115 people in the township.

=== 2010 census ===
The 2010 United States census counted 43,070 people, 22,840 households, and 11,694 families in the township. The population density was 527.7 per square mile (203.7/km^{2}). There were 25,886 housing units at an average density of 317.2 per square mile (122.5/km^{2}). The racial makeup was 92.00% (39,623) White, 3.84% (1,654) Black or African American, 0.09% (38) Native American, 1.78% (768) Asian, 0.02% (10) Pacific Islander, 1.11% (479) from other races, and 1.16% (498) from two or more races. Hispanic or Latino of any race were 4.79% (2,062) of the population.

Of the 22,840 households, 9.7% had children under the age of 18; 42.5% were married couples living together; 6.7% had a female householder with no husband present and 48.8% were non-families. Of all households, 45.4% were made up of individuals and 36.1% had someone living alone who was 65 years of age or older. The average household size was 1.85 and the average family size was 2.55.

10.3% of the population were under the age of 18, 3.7% from 18 to 24, 12.6% from 25 to 44, 23.3% from 45 to 64, and 50.2% who were 65 years of age or older. The median age was 65.1 years. For every 100 females, the population had 74.5 males. For every 100 females ages 18 and older there were 71.9 males.

The Census Bureau's 2006–2010 American Community Survey showed that (in 2010 inflation-adjusted dollars) median household income was $37,942 (with a margin of error of +/− $1,492) and the median family income was $54,114 (+/− $1,831). Males had a median income of $51,366 (+/− $2,772) versus $39,427 (+/− $3,352) for females. The per capita income for the borough was $27,264 (+/− $754). About 4.2% of families and 7.0% of the population were below the poverty line, including 9.9% of those under age 18 and 6.2% of those age 65 or over.

=== 2000 census ===
As of the 2000 United States census there were 38,928 people, 20,688 households, and 10,819 families residing in the township. The population density was 471.3 inhabitants per square mile (182.0/km^{2}). There were 22,681 housing units at an average density of 274.6 per square mile (106.0/km^{2}). The racial makeup of the township was 94.34% White, 3.06% African American, 0.12% Native American, 0.87% Asian, 0.03% Pacific Islander, 0.69% from other races, and 0.91% from two or more races. Hispanic or Latino of any race were 2.63% of the population.

There were 20,688 households, out of which 9.9% had children under the age of 18 living with them, 45.8% were married couples living together, 5.0% had a female householder with no husband present, and 47.7% were non-families. 45.0% of all households were made up of individuals, and 39.0% had someone living alone who was 65 years of age or older. The average household size was 1.85 and the average family size was 2.53.

In the township the population was spread out, with 10.7% under the age of 18, 3.5% from 18 to 24, 13.4% from 25 to 44, 17.8% from 45 to 64, and 54.5% who were 65 years of age or older. The median age was 68 years. For every 100 females, there were 73.3 males. For every 100 females age 18 and over, there were 70.1 males.

The median income for a household in the township was $29,525, and the median income for a family was $43,363. Males had a median income of $41,181 versus $30,523 for females. The per capita income for the township was $22,409. About 3.0% of families and 5.5% of the population were below the poverty line, including 6.5% of those under age 18 and 4.7% of those age 65 or over.

== Government ==
=== Local government ===
Manchester Township is governed within the Faulkner Act, formally known as the Optional Municipal Charter Law, under the Mayor-Council (Plan 6) system of municipal government, as enacted by direct petition as of July 1, 1990. The township is one of 71 municipalities (of the 564) statewide that use this form of government. The Township's governing body is comprised of the Mayor and the five-member Township Council. The mayor is elected directly by the voters to a four-year term. Councilmembers are elected at-large on a non-partisan basis to serve four-year staggered terms with either two or three council seats up for election in even-numbered years, with the mayoral seat up for vote at the same time that two council seats are up for vote. The township's municipal elections were shifted from May to November, with estimates of savings of $50,000 each election cycle and greater voter participation cited as justifications. A referendum on the ballot in November 2011 to shift the election date passed by a margin of 5,875 to 3,429.

As of 2024, the Mayor of Manchester Township is Robert Arace, who was elected in the run-off election of December 13, 2022. Members of the Township Council are Council President Roxy Conniff (2027), Council Vice President James A. Vaccaro Sr. (2024), Joseph Hankins (2026), Craig A. Wallis (2024; elected to serve an unexpired term) and Michele Zolezi (2026).

in February 2023, former councilmember Crag Wallis was appointed to fill the seat expiring in December 2024 that had been held by Samuel F. Fusaro until he resigned from office after moving out of the township. Wallis served on an interim basis until the November 2023 general election, when he was chosen to serve the balance of the ter.

The Township Council appointed Robert Hudak in June 2021 to fill the seat as mayor expiring in December 2022 that became vacant after Kenneth Palmer stepped down to take a seat as a judge on the New Jersey Superior Court. In turn, Michele Zolezi was appointed to fill the council seat expiring in December 2024 that was vacated by Robert Hudak. In the November 2021 general election, Hudak was elected as mayor and Zolezi as councilmember to serve the remainder of the terms of office.

In May 2019, the Township Council appointed Robert Hudak to fill the seat expiring in December 2020 that had been held by Charles Frattini Sr. until he resigned from office the previous month. In November 2019, Hudak was elected to serve the balance of the term of office.

In March 2017, Joan Brush was selected by the township council to fill the seat expiring in 2018 that had been held by Brendan Weiner, who was moving out of the township; Brush will serve on an interim basis until the November 2017 general election, when voters will select a candidate to serve the balance of the term.

In 2018, the township had an average property tax bill of $4,093, the lowest in the county, compared to an average bill of $6,313 in Ocean County and $8,767 statewide.

=== Federal, state and county representation ===
Manchester Township is located in the 4th Congressional District and is part of New Jersey's 9th state legislative district.

For the 119th United States Congress, New Jersey's 4th congressional district is represented by Chris Smith (R, Manchester Township). New Jersey is represented in the United States Senate by Democrats Cory Booker (Newark, term ends 2027) and Andy Kim (Moorestown, term ends 2031).

For the 2026–2027 session, the 9th legislative district of the New Jersey Legislature is represented in the State Senate by Carmen Amato (R, Berkeley Township) and in the General Assembly by Greg Myhre (R, Stafford Township) and Brian E. Rumpf (R, Little Egg Harbor Township).

Ocean County is governed by a Board of County Commissioners composed of five members who are elected on an at-large basis in partisan elections and serving staggered three-year terms of office, with either one or two seats coming up for election each year as part of the November general election. At an annual reorganization held in the beginning of January, the board chooses a director and a deputy director from among its members. As of 2025, Ocean County's Commissioners (with party affiliation, term-end year and residence) are:

John P. Kelly (R, 2025, Eagleswood Township), Virginia E. Haines (R, 2025, Toms River), Robert Arace (R, Manchester Township, 2027) Jennifer Bacchione (R, Berkeley Township, 2027) and Frank Sadeghi (R, 2026, Toms River).

Constitutional officers elected on a countywide basis are: Clerk Scott M. Colabella (R, 2025, Barnegat Light), Sheriff Michael G. Mastronardy (R, 2025; Toms River) and Surrogate Jeffrey Moran (R, 2028, Beachwood).

=== Politics ===
As of March 2011, there were a total of 31,380 registered voters in Manchester Township, of which 8,336 (26.6%) were registered as Democrats, 9,606 (30.6%) were registered as Republicans and 13,424 (42.8%) were registered as Unaffiliated. There were 14 voters registered as Libertarians or Greens. Among the township's 2010 Census population, 72.9% (vs. 63.2% in Ocean County) were registered to vote, including 81.2% of those ages 18 and over (vs. 82.6% countywide).

Gubernatorial election results for Manchester Township
Year	Republican		Democratic		Third party(ies)	
Year	No.	%	No.	%	No.	%
2025	13,931	59.11%	9,507	40.34%	130	0.55%
2021	12,414	63.55%	7,012	35.90%	108	0.55%
2017	10,188	66.19%	4,889	31.76%	315	2.05%
2013	12,678	77.49%	3,500	21.39%	182	1.11%
2009	11,988	63.57%	5,796	30.74%	1,073	5.69%
2005	9,593	52.55%	7,908	43.32%	755	4.14%

In the 2012 presidential election, Republican Mitt Romney received 55.9% of the vote (12,970 cast), ahead of Democrat Barack Obama with 43.3% (10,041 votes), and other candidates with 0.8% (186 votes), among the 23,439 ballots cast by the township's 32,513 registered voters (242 ballots were spoiled), for a turnout of 72.1%. In the 2008 presidential election, Republican John McCain received 56.2% of the vote (14,368 cast), ahead of Democrat Barack Obama with 41.2% (10,533 votes) and other candidates with 1.5% (372 votes), among the 25,569 ballots cast by the township's 33,796 registered voters, for a turnout of 75.7%. In the 2004 presidential election, Republican George W. Bush received 55.6% of the vote (13,652 ballots cast), outpolling Democrat John Kerry with 42.9% (10,537 votes) and other candidates with 0.7% (235 votes), among the 24,572 ballots cast by the township's 32,133 registered voters, for a turnout percentage of 76.5.

Presidential Elections Results
Year	Republican	Democratic	Third Parties
2024	60.0% 17,286	38.6% 11,123	1.4% 341
2020	58.8% 17,720	40.0% 12,058	1.2% 273
2016	62.4% 15,278	35.3% 8,639	2.3% 556
2012	55.9% 12,970	43.3% 10,041	0.8% 186
2008	56.2% 14,368	41.2% 10,533	1.5% 372
2004	55.6% 13,652	42.9% 10,537	0.7% 235

In the 2013 gubernatorial election, Republican Chris Christie received 77.5% of the vote (12,678 cast), ahead of Democrat Barbara Buono with 21.4% (3,500 votes), and other candidates with 1.1% (182 votes), among the 16,709 ballots cast by the township's 32,442 registered voters (349 ballots were spoiled), for a turnout of 51.5%. In the 2009 gubernatorial election, Republican Chris Christie received 62.9% of the vote (11,988 ballots cast), ahead of Democrat Jon Corzine with 30.4% (5,796 votes), Independent Chris Daggett with 4.7% (896 votes) and other candidates with 0.9% (177 votes), among the 19,070 ballots cast by the township's 32,422 registered voters, yielding a 58.8% turnout.

United States Senate election results for Manchester Township1
Year	Republican		Democratic		Third party(ies)	
Year	No.	%	No.	%	No.	%
2024	15,706	58.62%	10,835	40.44%	250	0.93%
2018	12,725	62.09%	7,202	35.14%	566	2.76%
2012	12,122	55.24%	9,475	43.18%	346	1.58%
2006	9,500	54.67%	7,398	42.58%	478	2.75%

United States Senate election results for Manchester Township2
Year	Republican		Democratic		Third party(ies)	
Year	No.	%	No.	%	No.	%
2020	17,047	58.66%	11,538	39.70%	476	1.64%
2014	8,485	58.23%	5,779	39.66%	308	2.11%
2013	7,097	61.56%	4,323	37.50%	109	0.95%
2008	13,430	57.64%	9,382	40.27%	488	2.09%

== Education ==
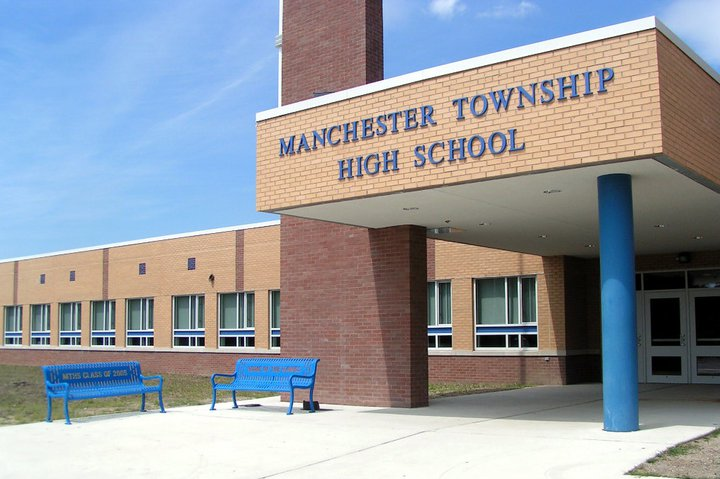
Manchester Township High School

The Manchester Township School District serves students in pre-kindergarten through twelfth grade. As of the 2024–25 school year, the district, comprised of six schools, had an enrollment of 2,916 students and 293.9 classroom teachers (on an FTE basis), for a student–teacher ratio of 9.9:1. Schools in the district (with 2024–25 enrollment data from the National Center for Education Statistics) are Manchester Township Elementary School with 573 students in grades PreK–5, Ridgeway Elementary School with 476 students in grades PreK–5, Whiting Elementary School with 266 students in grades PreK–5, Manchester Township Middle School with 586 students in grades 6–8, Manchester Township High School with 947 students in grades 9–12 and Regional Day School with 56 students in grades PreK-12, serves low incidence handicapped children. Students from neighboring Lakehurst attend the district's high school as part of a sending/receiving relationship with the Lakehurst School District.

St. Mary Academy in Manahawkin, a K–8 school of the Roman Catholic Diocese of Trenton, is in the area. From 1997, until 2019 it operated as All Saints Regional Catholic School and was collectively managed by five churches, with one being St. Elizabeth Ann Seton Church in Whiting. In 2019 St. Mary Church in Barnegat took entire control of the school, which remained on the same Manahawkin campus, and changed its name. The other churches no longer operate the school but still may send students there.

== Media ==
The Asbury Park Press provides daily news coverage of the township, as does WOBM-FM radio. The township provides materials and commentary to The Manchester Times, which also covers Lakehurst as one of seven weekly papers from Micromedia Publications.

== Transportation ==
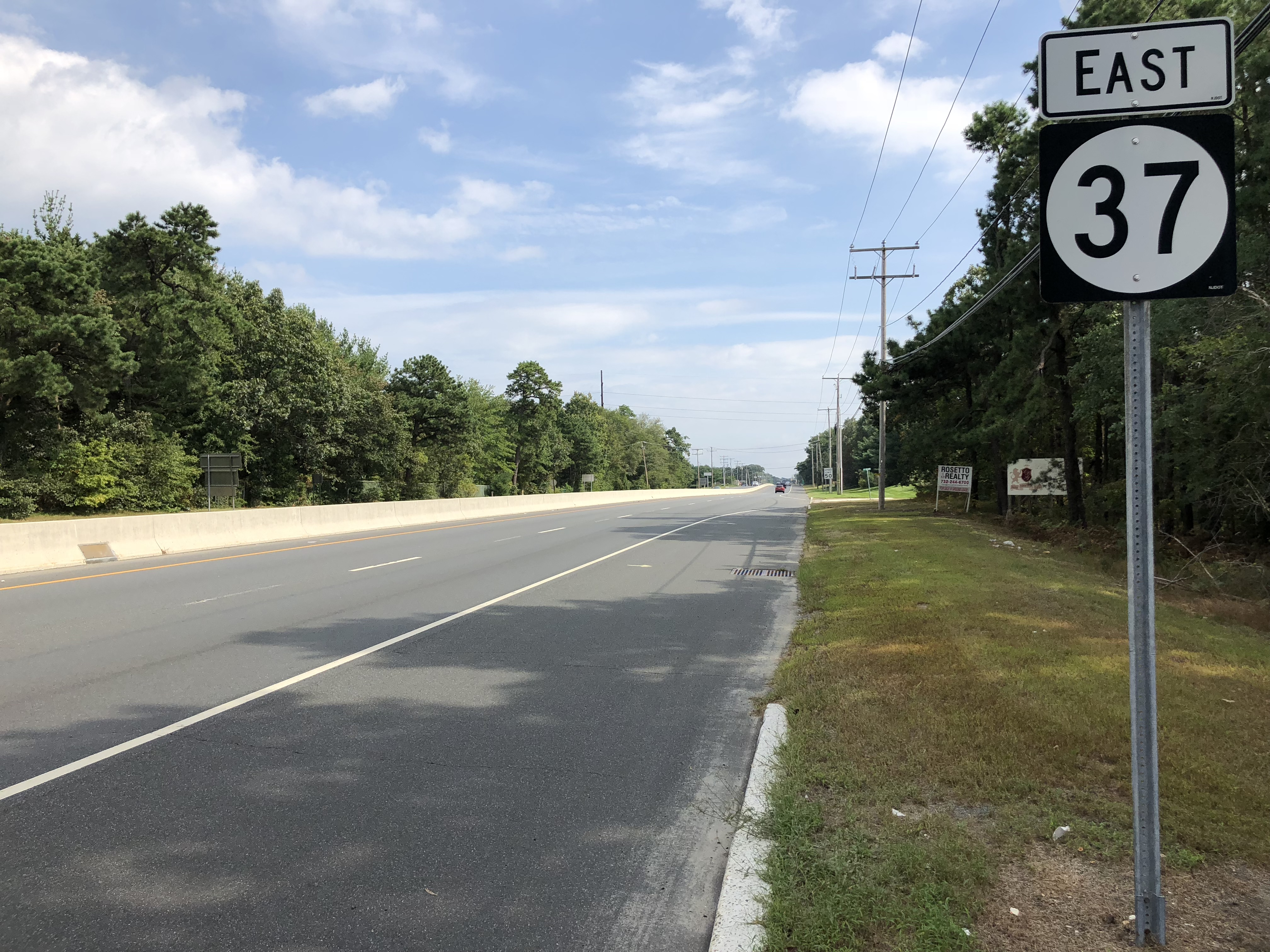
Route 37 eastbound in Manchester Township

=== Roads and highways ===
As of May 2010, the township had a total of 168.51 miles (271.19 km) of roadways, of which 109.71 miles (176.56 km) were maintained by the municipality, 43.56 miles (70.10 km) by Ocean County and 15.24 miles (24.53 km) by the New Jersey Department of Transportation.

Route 70 passes through the heart of the township while Route 37 goes through in the east. CR 530 travels along Route 70 and then veers off to the east, while CR 539 goes from north to south. In addition, both CR 547 and CR 571 run through the northeastern part.

No limited access roads run through the municipality, but the closest ones are accessible in neighboring communities such as the Garden State Parkway in Toms River, Berkeley and Lacey townships and Interstate 195 in Jackson Township.

=== Public transportation ===
Ocean Ride local service is provided on the OC1 Whiting, OC1A Whiting Express and OC2 Manchester routes.

== Notable people ==
People who were born in, residents of, or otherwise closely associated with Manchester Township include:

- Darius Adams (born 2006), college basketball player for the Maryland Terrapins
- Joe Cinderella (1927–2012), jazz guitarist
- George A. Krol (born 1956), former United States Ambassador to Belarus
- Kevin Malast (born 1986), former football linebacker who played in the NFL for the Chicago Bears, Jacksonville Jaguars and Tennessee Titans
- Shavar Reynolds Jr. (born 1998), basketball player for PAOK BC of the Greek Basket League
- Julia Scotti, transgender stand-up comedian
- Chris Smith (born 1953), U.S. representative
- George Tuska (1916–2009), comic book and newspaper comic strip artist
- Andrew Valmon (born 1965), Olympic gold medal-winning runner
