= Pine Ridge at Crestwood, New Jersey =

Populated place in Ocean County, New Jersey, US

- Census-designated place
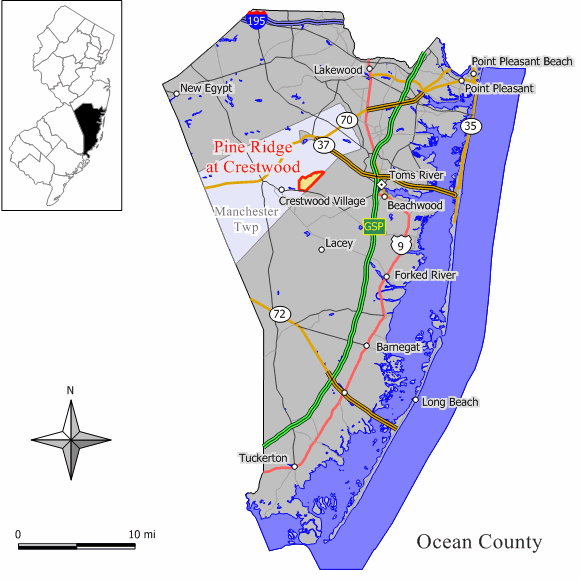
- Location of Pine Ridge at Crestwood in Ocean County highlighted in yellow (right). Inset map: Location of Ocean County in New Jersey highlighted in black (left).

- Location in Ocean County Location in New Jersey Location in the United States
- Coordinates: 39.961557°N 74.312016°W
- Country: United States
- State: New Jersey
- County: Ocean
- Township: Manchester

Area
  - Total: 1.59 sq mi (4.11 km^{2})
  - Land: 1.58 sq mi (4.09 km^{2})
  - Water: 0.0077 sq mi (0.02 km^{2}) 0.48%
- Elevation: 69 ft (21 m)

Population (2020)
  - Total: 2,537
  - Density: 1,605.8/sq mi (620.02/km^{2})
- Time zone: UTC−05:00 (Eastern (EST))
  - Summer (DST): UTC−04:00 (Eastern (EDT))
- FIPS code: 34-58852
- GNIS feature ID: 02389676

Pine Ridge at Crestwood is an unincorporated community and census-designated place (CDP) located within Manchester Township, in Ocean County, in the U.S. state of New Jersey. As of the 2020 census, Pine Ridge at Crestwood had a population of 2,537.

== Geography ==
According to the United States Census Bureau, the Pine Ridge at Crestwood CDP had a total area of 1.736 square miles (4.50 km^{2}), including 1.728 square miles (4.48 km^{2}) of land and 0.008 square miles (0.021 km^{2}) of water (0.48%).

== Demographics ==
Historical population
Census	Pop.	Note	%±
1990	2,372		—
2000	2,025		−14.6%
2010	2,369		17.0%
2020	2,537		7.1%
Population sources: 1950 1960 1970; 1980 1990 2000; 2010 2020

Pine Ridge first appeared as a census designated place in the 1990 U.S. census.

=== Racial and ethnic composition ===
Pine Ridge at Crestwood CDP, New Jersey – Racial and ethnic composition Note: the US Census treats Hispanic/Latino as an ethnic category. This table excludes Latinos from the racial categories and assigns them to a separate category. Hispanics/Latinos may be of any race.
Race / Ethnicity (NH = Non-Hispanic)	Pop 2000	Pop 2010	Pop 2020	% 2000	% 2010	% 2020
White alone (NH)	1,984	2,243	2,231	97.98%	94.68%	87.94%
Black or African American alone (NH)	10	37	72	0.49%	1.56%	2.84%
Native American or Alaska Native alone (NH)	1	1	3	0.05%	0.04%	0.12%
Asian alone (NH)	5	17	35	0.25%	0.72%	1.38%
Native Hawaiian or Pacific Islander alone (NH)	0	0	0	0.00%	0.00%	0.00%
Other race alone (NH)	0	0	11	0.00%	0.00%	0.43%
Mixed race or Multiracial (NH)	9	16	57	0.44%	0.68%	2.25%
Hispanic or Latino (any race)	16	55	128	0.79%	2.32%	5.05%
Total	2,025	2,369	2,537	100.00%	100.00%	100.00%

=== 2020 census ===
As of the 2020 census, Pine Ridge at Crestwood had a population of 2,537. The median age was 68.4 years. 0.3% of residents were under the age of 18 and 61.3% of residents were 65 years of age or older. For every 100 females there were 79.2 males, and for every 100 females age 18 and over there were 79.2 males age 18 and over.

100.0% of residents lived in urban areas, while 0.0% lived in rural areas.

There were 1,599 households in Pine Ridge at Crestwood, of which 2.0% had children under the age of 18 living in them. Of all households, 32.5% were married-couple households, 21.6% were households with a male householder and no spouse or partner present, and 42.0% were households with a female householder and no spouse or partner present. About 49.0% of all households were made up of individuals and 35.6% had someone living alone who was 65 years of age or older.

There were 1,760 housing units, of which 9.1% were vacant. The homeowner vacancy rate was 3.4% and the rental vacancy rate was 8.5%.

=== 2010 census ===
The 2010 United States census counted 2,369 people, 1,550 households, and 687 families in the CDP. The population density was 1,370.9 people per square mile (529.3 people/km^{2}). There were 1,810 housing units at an average density of 1,047.5 units per square mile (404.4 units/km^{2}). The racial makeup was 96.45% (2,285) White, 1.56% (37) Black or African American, 0.04% (1) Native American, 0.72% (17) Asian, 0.00% (0) Pacific Islander, 0.51% (12) from other races, and 0.72% (17) from two or more races. Hispanic or Latino of any race were 2.32% (55) of the population.

Of the 1,550 households, 0.1% had children under the age of 18; 35.7% were married couples living together; 6.8% had a female householder with no husband present and 55.7% were non-families. Of all households, 52.3% were made up of individuals and 40.7% had someone living alone who was 65 years of age or older. The average household size was 1.53 and the average family size was 2.10.

0.3% of the population were under the age of 18, 0.8% from 18 to 24, 3.5% from 25 to 44, 30.1% from 45 to 64, and 65.3% who were 65 years of age or older. The median age was 69.1 years. For every 100 females, the population had 75.0 males. For every 100 females ages 18 and older there were 74.7 males.

=== 2000 census ===
As of the 2000 United States census there were 2,025 people, 1,367 households, and 567 families living in the CDP. The population density was 457.2 people/km^{2} (1,184 people/mi^{2}). There were 1,514 housing units at an average density of 341.8 units/km^{2} (885 units/mi^{2}). The racial makeup of the CDP was 98.77% White, 0.49% African American, 0.05% Native American, 0.25% Asian, and 0.44% from two or more races. Hispanic or Latino of any race were 0.79% of the population.

There were 1,367 households, out of which none had children under the age of 18 living with them, 34.8% were married couples living together, 5.6% had a female householder with no husband present, and 58.5% were non-families. 55.4% of all households were made up of individuals, and 48.3% had someone living alone who was 65 years of age or older. The average household size was 1.48 and the average family size was 2.07.

In the CDP the population was spread out, with 0.2% under the age of 18, 0.4% from 18 to 24, 2.2% from 25 to 44, 17.7% from 45 to 64, and 79.5% who were 65 years of age or older. The median age was 75 years. For every 100 females, there were 62.4 males. For every 100 females age 18 and over, there were 62.3 males.

The median income for a household in the CDP was $22,019, and the median income for a family was $27,750. Males had a median income of $16,094 versus $31,071 for females. The per capita income for the CDP was $20,320. About 5.7% of families and 5.7% of the population were below the poverty line, including none of those under age 18 and 5.2% of those age 65 or over.
