= Leisure Knoll, New Jersey =

Populated place in Ocean County, New Jersey, US

- Census-designated place
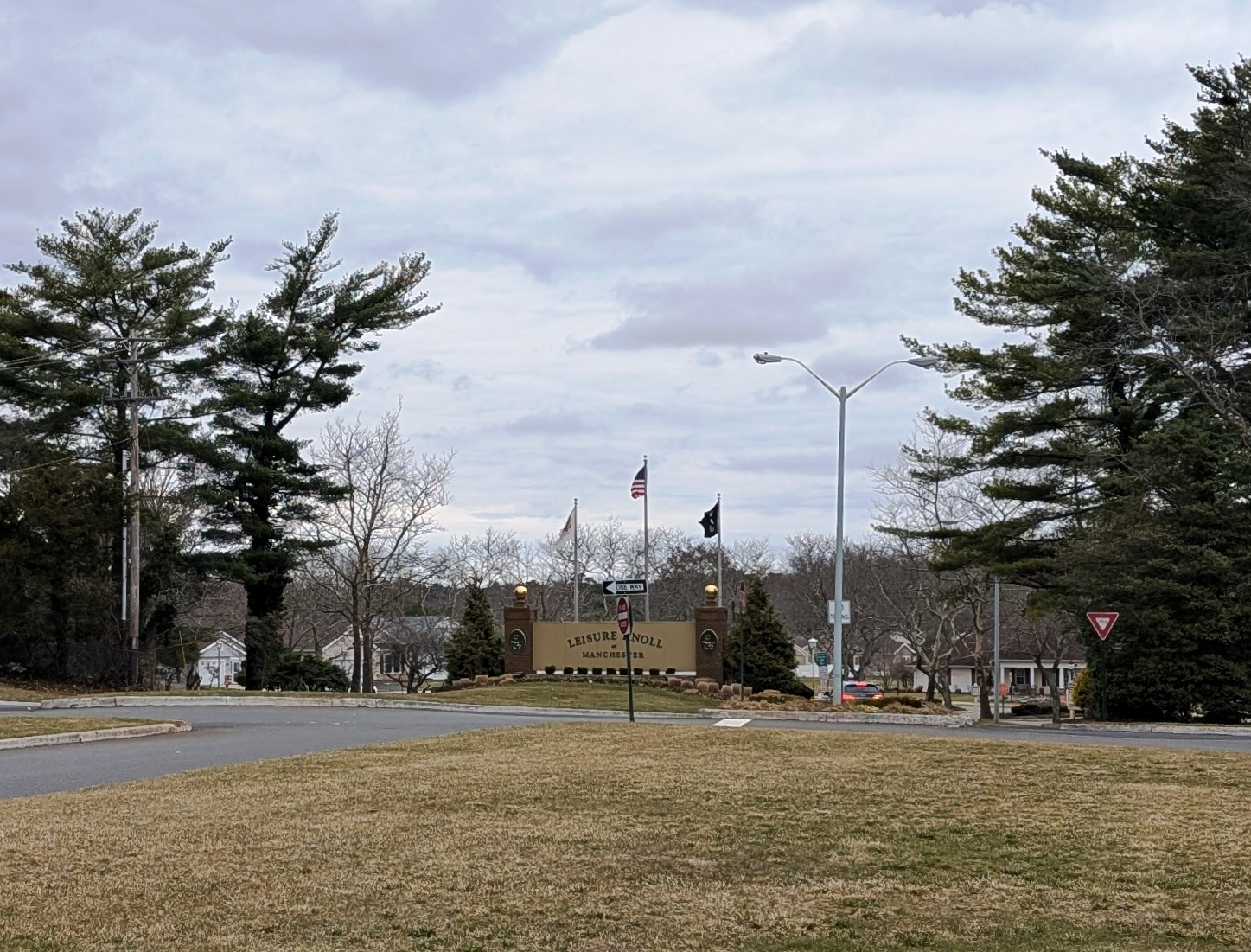
- Main entrance to community as seen from Route 70

- Map of Leisure Knoll CDP in Ocean County. Inset: Location of Ocean County in New Jersey.

- Location in Ocean County Location in New Jersey Location in the United States
- Coordinates: 40.018055°N 74.28963°W
- Country: United States
- State: New Jersey
- County: Ocean
- Township: Manchester

Area
  - Total: 0.90 sq mi (2.32 km^{2})
  - Land: 0.89 sq mi (2.30 km^{2})
  - Water: 0.0077 sq mi (0.02 km^{2}) 0.80%
- Elevation: 75 ft (23 m)

Population (2020)
  - Total: 2,562
  - Density: 2,885.1/sq mi (1,113.96/km^{2})
- Time zone: UTC−05:00 (Eastern (EST))
  - Summer (DST): UTC−04:00 (Eastern (EDT))
- FIPS code: 34-39883
- GNIS feature ID: 02390050

Leisure Knoll is an unincorporated community and census-designated place (CDP) located within Manchester Township, in Ocean County, in the U.S. state of New Jersey. As of the 2020 census, Leisure Knoll had a population of 2,562.

== Geography ==
According to the United States Census Bureau, the CDP had a total area of 0.895 square miles (2.32 km^{2}), including 0.888 square miles (2.30 km^{2}) of land and 0.007 square miles (0.018 km^{2}) of water (0.80%).

== Demographics ==
Historical population
Census	Pop.	Note	%±
1990	2,707		—
2000	2,467		−8.9%
2010	2,490		0.9%
2020	2,562		2.9%
Population sources: 1950 1960 1970; 1980 1990 2000; 2010 2020

Leisure Knoll first appeared as a census designated place in the 1990 U.S. census.

=== Racial and ethnic composition ===
Leisure Knoll CDP, New Jersey – Racial and ethnic composition Note: the US Census treats Hispanic/Latino as an ethnic category. This table excludes Latinos from the racial categories and assigns them to a separate category. Hispanics/Latinos may be of any race.
Race / Ethnicity (NH = Non-Hispanic)	Pop 2000	Pop 2010	Pop 2020	% 2000	% 2010	% 2020
White alone (NH)	2,425	2,388	2,326	98.30%	95.90%	90.79%
Black or African American alone (NH)	11	35	75	0.45%	1.41%	2.93%
Native American or Alaska Native alone (NH)	0	0	1	0.00%	0.00%	0.04%
Asian alone (NH)	7	9	25	0.28%	0.36%	0.98%
Native Hawaiian or Pacific Islander alone (NH)	1	0	0	0.04%	0.00%	0.00%
Other race alone (NH)	0	0	2	0.00%	0.00%	0.08%
Mixed race or Multiracial (NH)	5	11	37	0.20%	0.44%	1.44%
Hispanic or Latino (any race)	18	47	96	0.73%	1.89%	3.75%
Total	2,467	2,490	2,562	100.00%	100.00%	100.00%

=== 2020 census ===
As of the 2020 census, Leisure Knoll had a population of 2,562. The median age was 72.5 years. 0.7% of residents were under the age of 18 and 73.9% of residents were 65 years of age or older. For every 100 females there were 67.9 males, and for every 100 females age 18 and over there were 67.3 males age 18 and over.

100.0% of residents lived in urban areas, while 0.0% lived in rural areas.

There were 1,509 households in Leisure Knoll, of which 1.5% had children under the age of 18 living in them. Of all households, 42.8% were married-couple households, 11.7% were households with a male householder and no spouse or partner present, and 43.1% were households with a female householder and no spouse or partner present. About 45.0% of all households were made up of individuals and 37.9% had someone living alone who was 65 years of age or older.

There were 1,624 housing units, of which 7.1% were vacant. The homeowner vacancy rate was 2.8% and the rental vacancy rate was 5.6%.

=== 2010 census ===
The 2010 United States census counted 2,490 people, 1,499 households, and 738 families in the CDP. The population density was 2,805.5 people per square mile (1,083.2 people/km^{2}). There were 1,627 housing units at an average density of 1,833.1 units per square mile (707.8 units/km^{2}). The racial makeup was 97.59% (2,430) White, 1.41% (35) Black or African American, 0.00% (0) Native American, 0.36% (9) Asian, 0.00% (0) Pacific Islander, 0.20% (5) from other races, and 0.44% (11) from two or more races. Hispanic or Latino of any race were 1.89% (47) of the population.

Of the 1,499 households, 0.1% had children under the age of 18; 44.2% were married couples living together; 3.8% had a female householder with no husband present and 50.8% were non-families. Of all households, 48.0% were made up of individuals and 42.4% had someone living alone who was 65 years of age or older. The average household size was 1.57 and the average family size was 2.09.

0.2% of the population were under the age of 18, 0.5% from 18 to 24, 1.7% from 25 to 44, 18.0% from 45 to 64, and 79.5% who were 65 years of age or older. The median age was 75.0 years. For every 100 females, the population had 65.1 males. For every 100 females ages 18 and older there were 65.1 males.

=== 2000 census ===
As of the 2000 United States census there were 2,467 people, 1,540 households, and 845 families living in the CDP. The population density was 1,082.4 people/km^{2} (2,803 people/mi^{2}). There were 1,634 housing units at an average density of 716.9 units/km^{2} (1,857 units/mi^{2}). The racial makeup of the CDP was 98.87% White, 0.45% African American, 0.28% Asian, 0.04% Pacific Islander, 0.16% from other races, and 0.20% from two or more races. Hispanic or Latino of any race were 0.73% of the population.

There were 1,540 households, out of which none had children under the age of 18 living with them, 51.1% were married couples living together, 3.1% had a female householder with no husband present, and 45.1% were non-families. 43.1% of all households were made up of individuals, and 40.8% had someone living alone who was 65 years of age or older. The average household size was 1.60 and the average family size was 2.06.

In the CDP the population was spread out, with 0.1% under the age of 18, 0.2% from 18 to 24, 1.1% from 25 to 44, 13.9% from 45 to 64, and 84.7% who were 65 years of age or older. The median age was 75 years. For every 100 females, there were 68.7 males. For every 100 females age 18 and over, there were 68.8 males.

The median income for a household in the CDP was $36,207, and the median income for a family was $41,741. Males had a median income of $41,964 versus $27,727 for females. The per capita income for the CDP was $25,012. About 1.6% of families and 2.4% of the population were below the poverty line, including none of those under age 18 and 1.2% of those age 65 or over.
