= Leisure Village West, New Jersey =

Populated place in Ocean County, New Jersey, US

- Census-designated place
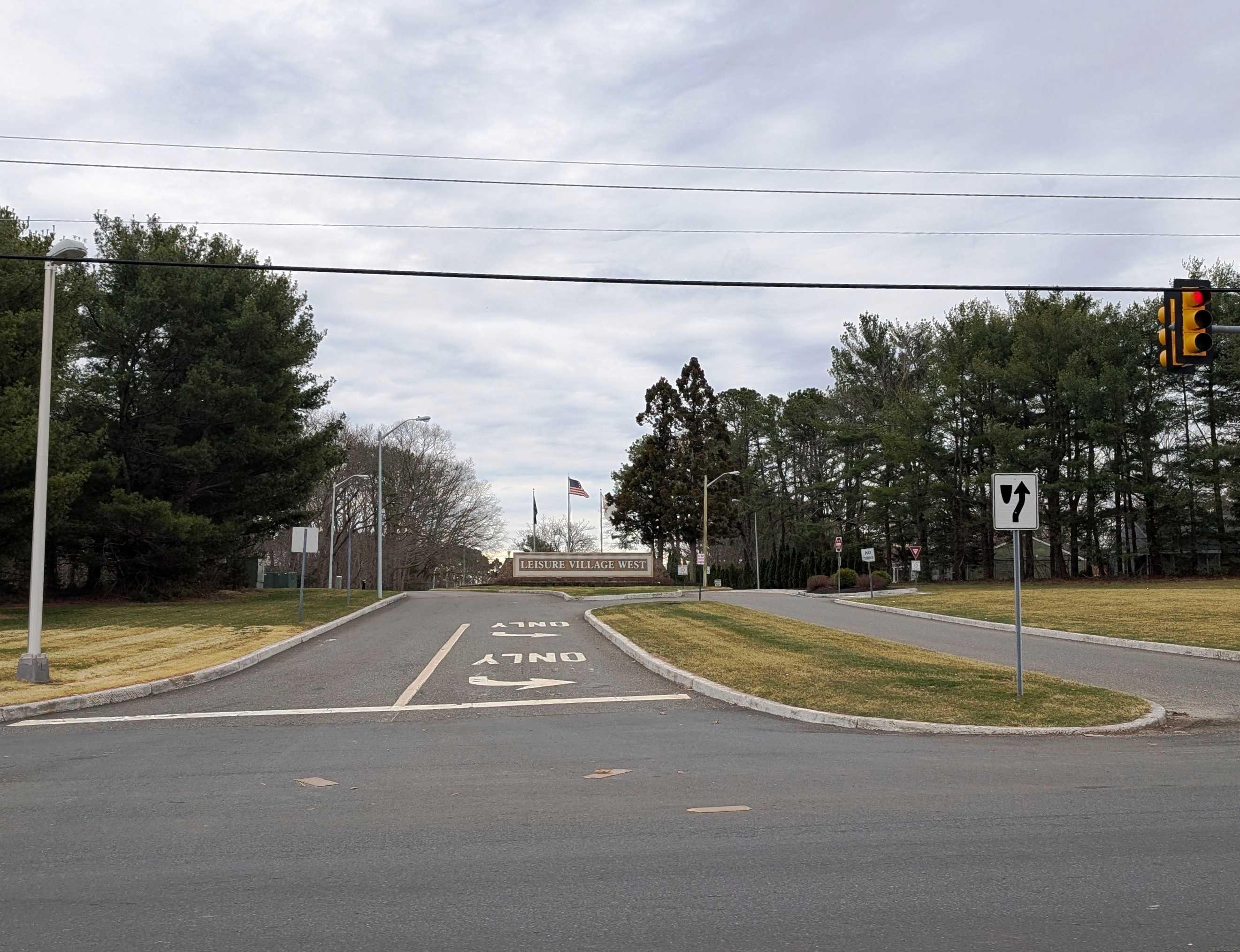
- Main entrance to community from Route 70

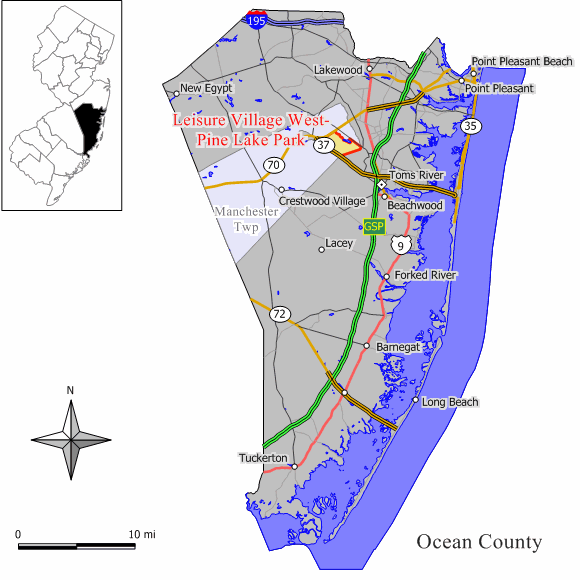
- Map of the former Leisure Village West-Pine Lake Park CDP in Ocean County. Inset: Location of Ocean County in New Jersey.

- Location in Ocean County Location in New Jersey Location in the United States
- Coordinates: 40°00′37″N 74°16′50″W
- Country: United States
- State: New Jersey
- County: Ocean
- Township: Manchester

Area
  - Total: 1.22 sq mi (3.16 km^{2})
  - Land: 1.21 sq mi (3.13 km^{2})
  - Water: 0.012 sq mi (0.03 km^{2}) 0.98%
- Elevation: 39 ft (12 m)

Population (2020)
  - Total: 3,692
  - Density: 3,051.9/sq mi (1,178.34/km^{2})
- Time zone: UTC−05:00 (Eastern (EST))
  - Summer (DST): UTC−04:00 (Eastern (EDT))
- FIPS code: 34-39920
- GNIS feature ID: 2652339

Leisure Village West is an unincorporated community and census-designated place (CDP) located within Manchester Township, in Ocean County, in the U.S. state of New Jersey. Until the 2000 census, the CDP had been part of the Leisure Village West-Pine Lake Park CDP, which was split for the 2010 enumeration into separate CDPs for Leisure Village West and Pine Lake Park. As of the 2020 census, Leisure Village West had a population of 3,692. Leisure Village West is one of several active adult communities bearing similar names. Leisure Village and Leisure Village East are the other two communities nearby.

== Geography ==
According to the United States Census Bureau, the CDP had a total area of 1.222 square miles (3.164 km^{2}), including 1.210 square miles (3.133 km^{2}) of land and 0.012 square miles (0.031 km^{2}) of water (0.98%).

== Demographics ==
Historical population
Census	Pop.	Note	%±
2010	3,493		—
2020	3,692		5.7%
Population sources: 2010 2020

Leisure Village West first appeared as a census designated place in the 2010 U.S. census formed from part of the deleted Leisure Village West-Pine Lake Park CDP.

=== Racial and ethnic composition ===
Leisure Village West CDP, New Jersey – Racial and ethnic composition Note: the US Census treats Hispanic/Latino as an ethnic category. This table excludes Latinos from the racial categories and assigns them to a separate category. Hispanics/Latinos may be of any race.
Race / Ethnicity (NH = Non-Hispanic)	Pop 2010	Pop 2020	% 2010	% 2020
White alone (NH)	3,335	3,246	95.48%	87.92%
Black or African American alone (NH)	55	143	1.57%	3.87%
Native American or Alaska Native alone (NH)	2	0	0.06%	0.00%
Asian alone (NH)	26	39	0.74%	1.06%
Native Hawaiian or Pacific Islander alone (NH)	1	0	0.03%	0.00%
Other race alone (NH)	2	6	0.06%	0.16%
Mixed race or Multiracial (NH)	7	83	0.20%	2.25%
Hispanic or Latino (any race)	65	175	1.86%	4.74%
Total	3,493	3,692	100.00%	100.00%

=== 2020 census ===
As of the 2020 census, the CDP had a population of 3,692.

The median age was 72.0 years. About 1.7% of residents were under the age of 18 and 71.9% were 65 years of age or older. For every 100 females, there were 58.0 males, and for every 100 females age 18 and over, there were 57.8 males.

Of residents, 100.0% lived in urban areas and 0.0% lived in rural areas.

There were 2,505 households, of which 3.7% had children under the age of 18 living in them. Of all households, 30.1% were married-couple households, 16.3% were households with a male householder and no spouse or partner present, and 51.2% were households with a female householder and no spouse or partner present. About 57.7% of all households were made up of individuals, and 48.3% had someone living alone who was 65 years of age or older.

There were 2,778 housing units, of which 9.8% were vacant. The homeowner vacancy rate was 3.9% and the rental vacancy rate was 3.2%.

=== 2010 census ===
The 2010 United States census counted 3,493 people, 2,347 households, and 979 families in the CDP. The population density was 2,887.4 per square mile (1,114.8/km^{2}). There were 2,665 housing units at an average density of 2,203.0 per square mile (850.6/km^{2}). The racial makeup was 97.05% (3,390) White, 1.60% (56) Black or African American, 0.06% (2) Native American, 0.74% (26) Asian, 0.03% (1) Pacific Islander, 0.20% (7) from other races, and 0.31% (11) from two or more races. Hispanic or Latino of any race were 1.86% (65) of the population.

Of the 2,347 households, 0.1% had children under the age of 18; 36.3% were married couples living together; 4.2% had a female householder with no husband present and 58.3% were non-families. Of all households, 54.5% were made up of individuals and 47.1% had someone living alone who was 65 years of age or older. The average household size was 1.49 and the average family size was 2.07.

0.2% of the population were under the age of 18, 0.6% from 18 to 24, 2.1% from 25 to 44, 17.1% from 45 to 64, and 80.0% who were 65 years of age or older. The median age was 76.3 years. For every 100 females, the population had 60.8 males. For every 100 females ages 18 and older there were 60.7 males.
