= Leisure Village West-Pine Lake Park, New Jersey =

Populated place in Ocean County, New Jersey, US

- Census-designated place(CDP)
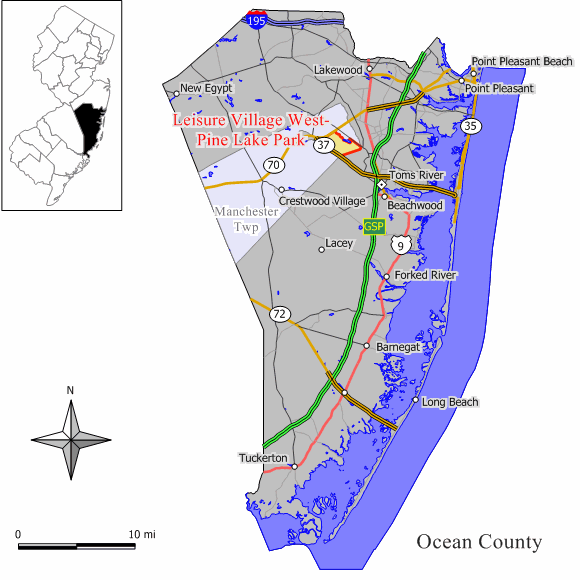
- Map of Leisure Village West-Pine Lake Park CDP in Ocean County
- Coordinates: 40°0′8″N 74°15′41″W
- Country: United States
- State: New Jersey
- County: Ocean
- Township: Manchester

Area
  - Total: 3.8 sq mi (9.8 km^{2})
  - Land: 3.8 sq mi (9.8 km^{2})
  - Water: 0 sq mi (0.0 km^{2})

Population (2000)
  - Total: 11,085
  - Density: 2,916/sq mi (1,125.9/km^{2})
- Time zone: UTC−05:00 (Eastern (EST))
  - Summer (DST): UTC−04:00 (Eastern (EDT))
- FIPS code: 34-39920

Leisure Village West-Pine Lake Park is an unincorporated community and census-designated place (CDP) located within Manchester Township, in Ocean County, in the U.S. state of New Jersey. As of the 2000 United States census, the CDP's population was 11,085. For the 2010 census the area was split into two CDPs, Leisure Village West and Pine Lake Park.

== Geography ==
According to the United States Census Bureau, the CDP had a total area of 9.8 km^{2} (3.8 sq mi), all of it land.

== Demographics ==
Historical population
Census	Pop.	Note	%±
1990	10,139		—
2000	11,085		9.3%
source: 2000

At the 2000 United States census, there were 11,085 people, 4,891 households and 3,135 families residing in the CDP. The population density was 1,126.3 people/km^{2} (2,917 people/mi^{2}). There were 5,236 housing units at an average density of 532.0 units/km^{2} (1,378 units/mi^{2}). The racial makeup of the CDP was 93.33% White, 2.86% African American, 0.18% Native American, 1.14% Asian, 0.05% Pacific Islander, 1.18% from other races, and 1.26% from two or more races. Hispanic or Latino of any race were 3.94% of the population.

There were 4,891 households, of which 21.3% had children under the age of 18 living with them, 56.1% were married couples living together, 5.8% had a female householder with no husband present, and 35.9% were non-families. 32.8% of all households were made up of individuals, and 27.5% had someone living alone who was 65 years of age or older. The average household size was 2.27 and the average family size was 2.86.

Age distribution was 18.6% under the age of 18, 6.0% from 18 to 24, 21.5% from 25 to 44, 17.7% from 45 to 64, and 36.3% who were 65 years of age or older. The median age was 48 years. For every 100 females, there were 84.9 males. For every 100 females age 18 and over, there were 80.4 males.

The median household income was $42,408, and the median family income was $51,831. Males had a median income of $41,846 versus $30,786 for females. The per capita income for the CDP was $22,149. About 2.8% of families and 4.1% of the population were below the poverty line, including 4.5% of those under age 18 and 3.6% of those age 65 or over.
