= Leisure Village, New Jersey =

Populated place in Ocean County, New Jersey, US

- Census-designated place
- Map of Leisure Village CDP in Ocean County. Inset: Location of Ocean County in New Jersey.

- Location in Ocean County Location in New Jersey Location in the United States
- Coordinates: 40.043765°N 74.186217°W
- Country: United States
- State: New Jersey
- County: Ocean
- Township: Lakewood

Area
  - Total: 1.38 sq mi (3.58 km^{2})
  - Land: 1.31 sq mi (3.38 km^{2})
  - Water: 0.077 sq mi (0.20 km^{2}) 6.00%
- Elevation: 49 ft (15 m)

Population (2020)
  - Total: 4,966
  - Density: 3,808.4/sq mi (1,470.45/km^{2})
- Time zone: UTC−05:00 (Eastern (EST))
  - Summer (DST): UTC−04:00 (Eastern (EDT))
- FIPS code: 34-39900
- GNIS feature ID: 02390051
- Website: www.leisurevillagenj.com

Leisure Village is an unincorporated community and census-designated place (CDP) located within Lakewood Township, in Ocean County, in the U.S. state of New Jersey. As of the 2020 census, Leisure Village had a population of 4,966. The sprawling active adult community is also locally known as "Original" Leisure Village because it was the first of three neighboring active adult communities bearing similar names. Leisure Village East, and Leisure Village West are the other two communities nearby. Original Leisure Village (OLV) is also referred to by the moniker "The Village of Seven Lakes."

== Geography ==
According to the United States Census Bureau, the CDP had a total area of 1.394 square miles (3.61 km^{2}), including 1.310 square miles (3.39 km^{2}) of land and 0.084 square miles (0.22 km^{2}) of water (6.00%).

== Demographics ==
Historical population
Census	Pop.	Note	%±
1990	4,295		—
2000	4,443		3.4%
2010	4,400		−1.0%
2020	4,966		12.9%
Population sources: 1950 1960 1970; 1980 1990 2000; 2010 2020

Leisure Village first appeared as a census designated place in the 1990 U.S. census.

=== Racial and ethnic composition ===
Leisure Village CDP, New Jersey – Racial and ethnic composition Note: the US Census treats Hispanic/Latino as an ethnic category. This table excludes Latinos from the racial categories and assigns them to a separate category. Hispanics/Latinos may be of any race.
Race / Ethnicity (NH = Non-Hispanic)	Pop 2000	Pop 2010	Pop 2020	% 2000	% 2010	% 2020
White alone (NH)	3,995	3,219	2,999	89.92%	73.16%	60.39%
Black or African American alone (NH)	140	408	339	3.15%	9.27%	6.83%
Native American or Alaska Native alone (NH)	1	1	7	0.02%	0.02%	0.14%
Asian alone (NH)	23	30	56	0.52%	0.68%	1.13%
Native Hawaiian or Pacific Islander alone (NH)	1	0	0	0.02%	0.00%	0.00%
Other race alone (NH)	0	2	15	0.00%	0.05%	0.30%
Mixed race or Multiracial (NH)	26	27	62	0.59%	0.61%	1.25%
Hispanic or Latino (any race)	257	713	1,488	5.78%	16.20%	29.96%
Total	4,443	4,400	4,966	100.00%	100.00%	100.00%

=== 2020 census ===
As of the 2020 census, Leisure Village had a population of 4,966. The median age was 63.8 years. 11.7% of residents were under the age of 18 and 47.2% of residents were 65 years of age or older. For every 100 females there were 73.3 males, and for every 100 females age 18 and over there were 70.0 males age 18 and over.

100.0% of residents lived in urban areas, while 0.0% lived in rural areas.

There were 2,684 households in Leisure Village, of which 9.3% had children under the age of 18 living in them. Of all households, 23.2% were married-couple households, 21.6% were households with a male householder and no spouse or partner present, and 51.0% were households with a female householder and no spouse or partner present. About 57.1% of all households were made up of individuals and 43.6% had someone living alone who was 65 years of age or older.

There were 3,069 housing units, of which 12.5% were vacant. The homeowner vacancy rate was 5.4% and the rental vacancy rate was 9.7%.

=== 2010 census ===
The 2010 United States census counted 4,400 people, 2,664 households, and 887 families in the CDP. The population density was 3,358.6 people per square mile (1,296.8 people/km^{2}). There were 3,080 housing units at an average density of 2,351.0 units per square mile (907.7 units/km^{2}). The racial makeup was 82.91% (3,648) White, 9.93% (437) Black or African American, 0.16% (7) Native American, 0.80% (35) Asian, 0.00% (0) Pacific Islander, 5.00% (220) from other races, and 1.20% (53) from two or more races. Hispanic or Latino of any race were 16.20% (713) of the population.

Of the 2,664 households, 5.3% had children under the age of 18; 21.8% were married couples living together; 8.7% had a female householder with no husband present and 66.7% were non-families. Of all households, 62.3% were made up of individuals and 51.6% had someone living alone who was 65 years of age or older. The average household size was 1.63 and the average family size was 2.65.

9.3% of the population were under the age of 18, 4.1% from 18 to 24, 10.1% from 25 to 44, 20.7% from 45 to 64, and 55.9% who were 65 years of age or older. The median age was 68.1 years. For every 100 females, the population had 60.2 males. For every 100 females ages 18 and older there were 57.6 males.

=== 2000 census ===
As of the 2000 United States census there were 4,443 people, 2,805 households, and 984 families living in the CDP. The population density was 1,394.7 people/km^{2} (3,612 people/mi^{2}). There were 3,122 housing units at an average density of 980.0 units/km^{2} (2,538 units/mi^{2}). The racial makeup of the CDP was 93.70% White, 3.26% African American, 0.02% Native American, 0.54% Asian, 0.02% Pacific Islander, 1.22% from other races, and 1.24% from two or more races. Hispanic or Latino of any race were 5.78% of the population.

There were 2,805 households, out of which 4.8% had children under the age of 18 living with them, 28.0% were married couples living together, 5.3% had a female householder with no husband present, and 64.9% were non-families. 62.3% of all households were made up of individuals, and 55.6% had someone living alone who was 65 years of age or older. The average household size was 1.56 and the average family size was 2.45.

In the CDP the population was spread out, with 7.3% under the age of 18, 2.4% from 18 to 24, 9.1% from 25 to 44, 15.5% from 45 to 64, and 65.7% who were 65 years of age or older. The median age was 72 years. For every 100 females, there were 54.6 males. For every 100 females age 18 and over, there were 51.4 males.

The median income for a household in the CDP was $24,496, and the median income for a family was $33,179. Males had a median income of $37,045 versus $24,816 for females. The per capita income for the CDP was $23,246. About 4.0% of families and 6.9% of the population were below the poverty line, including none of those under age 18 and 6.5% of those age 65 or over.
