= Leisure Village East, New Jersey =

Populated place in Ocean County, New Jersey, US

- Census-designated place
- Map of Leisure Village East CDP in Ocean County. Inset: Location of Ocean County in New Jersey.

- Location in Ocean County Location in New Jersey Location in the United States
- Coordinates: 40.037777°N 74.168192°W
- Country: United States
- State: New Jersey
- County: Ocean
- Township: Lakewood

Area
  - Total: 1.56 sq mi (4.04 km^{2})
  - Land: 1.55 sq mi (4.02 km^{2})
  - Water: 0.012 sq mi (0.03 km^{2}) 0.65%
- Elevation: 62 ft (19 m)

Population (2020)
  - Total: 4,189
  - Density: 2,701.7/sq mi (1,043.13/km^{2})
- Time zone: UTC−05:00 (Eastern (EST))
  - Summer (DST): UTC−04:00 (Eastern (EDT))
- FIPS code: 34-39910
- GNIS feature ID: 02390052

Leisure Village East is an unincorporated community and census-designated place (CDP) located within Lakewood Township, in Ocean County, in the U.S. state of New Jersey. As of the 2020 census, Leisure Village East had a population of 4,189. Leisure Village East is one of several active adult communities bearing similar names. Leisure Village and Leisure Village West are the other two communities nearby.

== Geography ==
According to the United States Census Bureau, the CDP had a total area of 1.497 square miles (3.88 km^{2}), including 1.487 square miles (3.85 km^{2}) of land and 0.010 square miles (0.026 km^{2}) of water (0.65%).

== Demographics ==
Historical population
Census	Pop.	Note	%±
1990	1,989		—
2000	4,597		131.1%
2010	4,217		−8.3%
2020	4,189		−0.7%
Population sources: 1950 1960 1970; 1980 1990 2000; 2010 2020

Leisure Village East first appeared as a census designated place in the 1990 U.S. census.

=== Racial and ethnic composition ===
Leisure Village East CDP, New Jersey – Racial and ethnic composition Note: the US Census treats Hispanic/Latino as an ethnic category. This table excludes Latinos from the racial categories and assigns them to a separate category. Hispanics/Latinos may be of any race.
Race / Ethnicity (NH = Non-Hispanic)	Pop 2000	Pop 2010	Pop 2020	% 2000	% 2010	% 2020
White alone (NH)	4,516	4,001	3,788	98.24%	94.88%	90.43%
Black or African American alone (NH)	14	59	90	0.30%	1.40%	2.15%
Native American or Alaska Native alone (NH)	0	2	0	0.00%	0.05%	0.00%
Asian alone (NH)	8	27	71	0.17%	0.64%	1.69%
Native Hawaiian or Pacific Islander alone (NH)	0	0	0	0.00%	0.00%	0.00%
Other race alone (NH)	0	2	6	0.00%	0.05%	0.14%
Mixed race or Multiracial (NH)	10	12	49	0.22%	0.28%	1.17%
Hispanic or Latino (any race)	49	114	185	1.07%	2.70%	4.42%
Total	4,597	4,217	4,189	100.00%	100.00%	100.00%

=== 2020 census ===
As of the 2020 census, Leisure Village East had a population of 4,189. The median age was 73.0 years. 0.7% of residents were under the age of 18 and 74.1% were 65 years of age or older. For every 100 females, there were 61.5 males, and for every 100 females age 18 and over there were 61.1 males.

100.0% of residents lived in urban areas, while 0.0% lived in rural areas.

There were 2,797 households, of which 1.4% had children under the age of 18. Of all households, 31.4% were married-couple households, 15.6% were households with a male householder and no spouse or partner present, and 50.4% were households with a female householder and no spouse or partner present. About 56.7% of all households were made up of individuals, and 48.4% had someone living alone who was 65 years of age or older.

There were 3,090 housing units, of which 9.5% were vacant. The homeowner vacancy rate was 2.6% and the rental vacancy rate was 3.7%.

=== 2010 census ===
The 2010 United States census counted 4,217 people, 2,743 households, and 1,251 families in the CDP. The population density was 2,836.2 people per square mile (1,095.1 people/km^{2}). There were 3,057 housing units at an average density of 2,056.0 units per square mile (793.8 units/km^{2}). The racial makeup was 97.27% (4,102) White, 1.47% (62) Black or African American, 0.05% (2) Native American, 0.64% (27) Asian, 0.00% (0) Pacific Islander, 0.24% (10) from other races, and 0.33% (14) from two or more races. Hispanic or Latino of any race were 2.70% (114) of the population.

Of the 2,743 households, 0.4% had children under the age of 18; 39.8% were married couples living together; 4.7% had a female householder with no husband present and 54.4% were non-families. Of all households, 50.9% were made up of individuals and 44.4% had someone living alone who was 65 years of age or older. The average household size was 1.54 and the average family size was 2.09.

0.6% of the population were under the age of 18, 0.7% from 18 to 24, 2.7% from 25 to 44, 16.1% from 45 to 64, and 79.9% who were 65 years of age or older. The median age was 75.2 years. For every 100 females, the population had 63.3 males. For every 100 females ages 18 and older there were 62.8 males.

=== 2000 census ===
As of the 2000 United States census there were 4,597 people, 2,826 households, and 1,574 families living in the CDP. The population density was 1,109.3 people/km^{2} (2,873 people/mi^{2}). There were 3,035 housing units at an average density of 732.4 units/km^{2} (1,897 units/mi^{2}). The racial makeup of the CDP was 99.22% White, 0.33% African American, 0.17% Asian, 0.02% from other races, and 0.26% from two or more races. Hispanic or Latino of any race were 1.07% of the population.

There were 2,826 households, out of which 0.2% had children under the age of 18 living with them, 51.6% were married couples living together, 3.6% had a female householder with no husband present, and 44.3% were non-families. 41.5% of all households were made up of individuals, and 35.5% had someone living alone who was 65 years of age or older. The average household size was 1.63 and the average family size was 2.07.

In the CDP the population was spread out, with 0.3% under the age of 18, 0.6% from 18 to 24, 2.3% from 25 to 44, 22.1% from 45 to 64, and 74.8% who were 65 years of age or older. The median age was 71 years. For every 100 females, there were 66.7 males. For every 100 females age 18 and over, there were 66.8 males.

The median income for a household in the CDP was $34,402, and the median income for a family was $50,510. Males had a median income of $50,833 versus $32,574 for females. The per capita income for the CDP was $28,879. About 0.5% of families and 2.2% of the population were below the poverty line, including none of those under age 18 and 2.7% of those age 65 or over.
