= Cedar Glen West, New Jersey =

Populated place in Ocean County, New Jersey, US

- Census-designated place
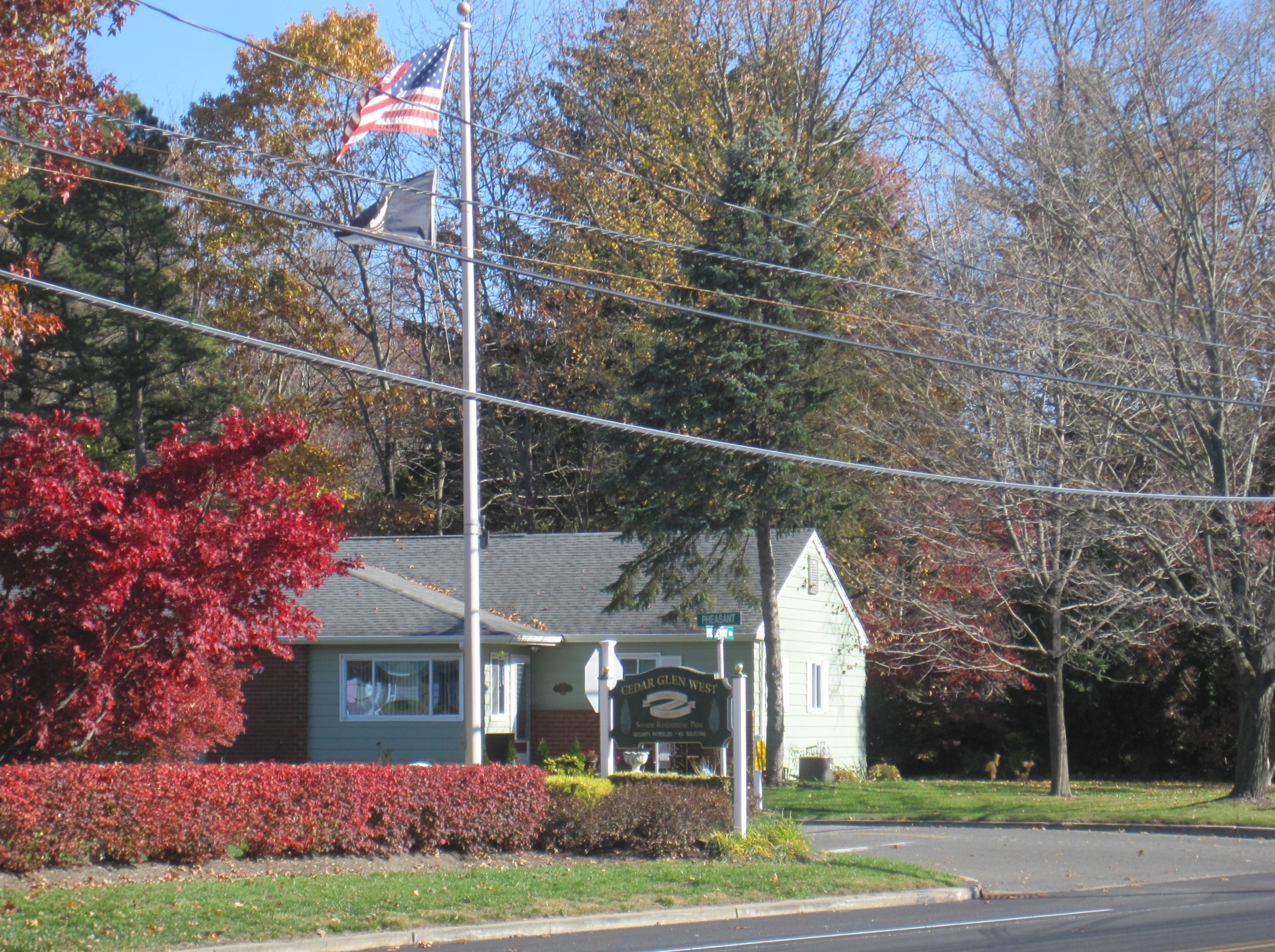
- Front of the Cedar Glen West Residential Park as seen from County Route 571

- Map of Cedar Glen West CDP in Ocean County. Inset: Location of Ocean County in New Jersey.
- Coordinates: 40.038163°N 74.28575°W
- Country: United States
- State: New Jersey
- County: Ocean
- Township: Manchester

Area
  - Total: 1.07 sq mi (2.78 km^{2})
  - Land: 1.06 sq mi (2.75 km^{2})
  - Water: 0.012 sq mi (0.03 km^{2}) 1.06%
- Elevation: 79 ft (24 m)

Population (2020)
  - Total: 1,379
  - Density: 1,300.2/sq mi (502.01/km^{2})
- Time zone: UTC−05:00 (Eastern (EST))
  - Summer (DST): UTC−04:00 (Eastern (EDT))
- FIPS code: 34-11155
- GNIS feature ID: 02389292

Cedar Glen West is an unincorporated community and census-designated place (CDP) located within Manchester Township, in Ocean County, in the U.S. state of New Jersey. As of the 2020 census, Cedar Glen West had a population of 1,379.

== Geography ==
According to the United States Census Bureau, the CDP had a total area of 1.070 square miles (2.77 km^{2}), including 1.059 square miles (2.74 km^{2}) of land and 0.011 square miles (0.028 km^{2}) of water (1.06%). Situated between Ridgeway Boulevard and Ridgeway Road (County Route 571) in the northern part of the township, most of the area consists of the private Cedar Glen West Inc. private residential park comprising smaller one-story single family homes. A mobile home park and other scattered homes are located in the CDP as well.

== Demographics ==
Historical population
Census	Pop.	Note	%±
1990	1,396		—
2000	1,376		−1.4%
2010	1,267		−7.9%
2020	1,379		8.8%
Population sources: 1950 1960 1970; 1980 1990 2000; 2010 2020

Cedar Glen Westfirst appeared as a census designated place in the 1990 U.S. census.

=== 2020 census ===
Cedar Glen West CDP, New Jersey – Racial and ethnic composition Note: the US Census treats Hispanic/Latino as an ethnic category. This table excludes Latinos from the racial categories and assigns them to a separate category. Hispanics/Latinos may be of any race.
Race / Ethnicity (NH = Non-Hispanic)	Pop 2000	Pop 2010	Pop 2020	% 2000	% 2010	% 2020
White alone (NH)	1,332	1,213	1,211	96.80%	95.74%	87.82%
Black or African American alone (NH)	18	10	28	1.31%	0.79%	2.03%
Native American or Alaska Native alone (NH)	2	2	1	0.15%	0.16%	0.07%
Asian alone (NH)	1	4	25	0.07%	0.32%	1.81%
Native Hawaiian or Pacific Islander alone (NH)	0	0	0	0.00%	0.00%	0.00%
Other race alone (NH)	0	0	0	0.00%	0.00%	0.00%
Mixed race or Multiracial (NH)	10	8	32	0.73%	0.63%	2.32%
Hispanic or Latino (any race)	13	30	82	0.94%	2.37%	5.95%
Total	1,376	1,267	1,379	100.00%	100.00%	100.00%

=== 2010 census ===
The 2010 United States census counted 1,267 people, 812 households, and 300 families in the CDP. The population density was 1,196.5 people per square mile (462.0 people/km^{2}). There were 985 housing units at an average density of 930.2 units per square mile (359.2 units/km^{2}). The racial makeup was 97.16% (1,231) White, 0.79% (10) Black or African American, 0.16% (2) Native American, 0.32% (4) Asian, 0.00% (0) Pacific Islander, 0.87% (11) from other races, and 0.71% (9) from two or more races. Hispanic or Latino of any race were 2.37% (30) of the population.

Of the 812 households, 5.7% had children under the age of 18; 25.7% were married couples living together; 9.0% had a female householder with no husband present and 63.1% were non-families. Of all households, 60.6% were made up of individuals and 50.9% had someone living alone who was 65 years of age or older. The average household size was 1.56 and the average family size was 2.40.

7.2% of the population were under the age of 18, 2.9% from 18 to 24, 8.4% from 25 to 44, 23.2% from 45 to 64, and 58.2% who were 65 years of age or older. The median age was 68.9 years. For every 100 females, the population had 62.2 males. For every 100 females ages 18 and older there were 60.4 males.

=== 2000 census ===
As of the 2000 United States census there were 1,376 people, 914 households, and 337 families living in the CDP. The population density was 487.4 people/km^{2} (1,262 people/mi^{2}). There were 1,015 housing units at an average density of 359.5 units/km^{2} (931 units/mi^{2}). The racial makeup of the CDP was 97.67% White, 1.38% African American, 0.15% Native American, 0.07% Asian, and 0.73% from two or more races. Hispanic or Latino of any race were 0.94% of the population.

There were 914 households, out of which 3.4% had children under the age of 18 living with them, 31.1% were married couples living together, 5.1% had a female householder with no husband present, and 63.1% were non-families. 60.2% of all households were made up of individuals, and 50.9% had someone living alone who was 65 years of age or older. The average household size was 1.51 and the average family size was 2.28.

In the CDP the population was spread out, with 5.0% under the age of 18, 1.4% from 18 to 24, 7.4% from 25 to 44, 18.0% from 45 to 64, and 68.2% who were 65 years of age or older. The median age was 73 years. For every 100 females, there were 57.1 males. For every 100 females age 18 and over, there were 54.1 males.

The median income for a household in the CDP was $21,840, and the median income for a family was $34,583. Males had a median income of $31,313 versus $29,583 for females. The per capita income for the CDP was $19,548. None of the families and 8.1% of the population were living below the poverty line, including no under eighteens and 9.0% of those over 64.
