= Crestwood Village, New Jersey =

CDP in Ocean County, New Jersey, US

- Census-designated place
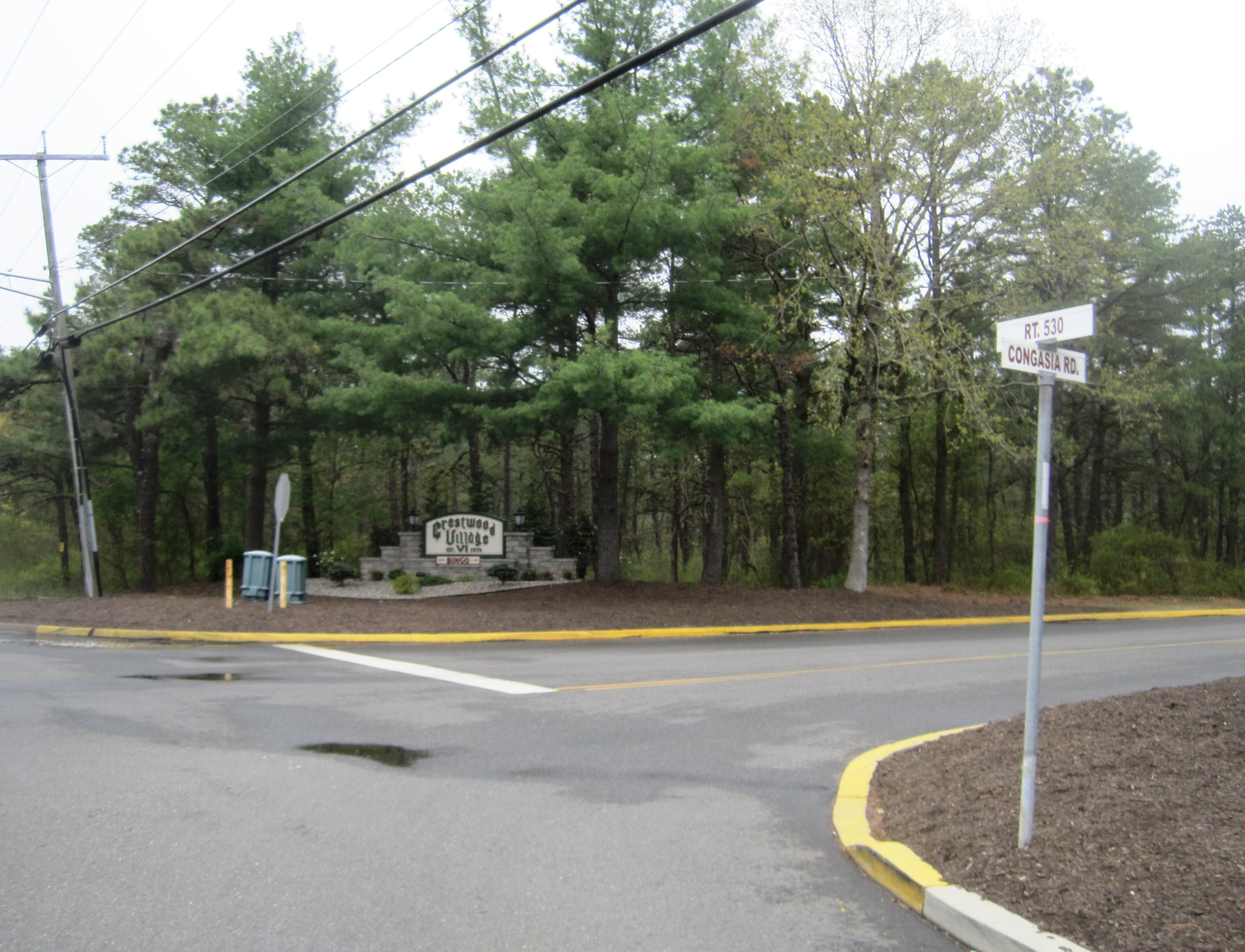
- Entrance to Crestwood Village VI, one of many retirement communities in the area

- Map of Crestwood Village CDP in Ocean County. Inset: Location of Ocean County in New Jersey.

- Location in Ocean County Location in New Jersey Location in the United States
- Coordinates: 39.955606°N 74.35323°W
- Country: United States
- State: New Jersey
- County: Ocean
- Township: Manchester

Area
  - Total: 4.32 sq mi (11.20 km^{2})
  - Land: 4.27 sq mi (11.07 km^{2})
  - Water: 0.050 sq mi (0.13 km^{2}) 1.40%
- Elevation: 112 ft (34 m)

Population (2020)
  - Total: 8,426
  - Density: 1,971.6/sq mi (761.22/km^{2})
- Time zone: UTC−05:00 (Eastern (EST))
  - Summer (DST): UTC−04:00 (Eastern (EDT))
- FIPS code: 34-15910
- GNIS feature ID: 02389373

Crestwood Village is an unincorporated community and census-designated place (CDP) located within Manchester Township, in Ocean County, in the U.S. state of New Jersey. As of the 2020 census, the CDP's population was 8,426.

== Geography ==
According to the United States Census Bureau, the CDP had a total area of 4.358 square miles (11.29 km^{2}), including 4.297 square miles (11.13 km^{2}) of land and 0.061 square miles (0.16 km^{2}) of water (1.40%).

== Demographics ==
Historical population
Census	Pop.	Note	%±
1980	7,965		—
1990	8,030		0.8%
2000	8,392		4.5%
2010	7,907		−5.8%
2020	8,426		6.6%
Population sources: 1950 1960 1970; 1980 1990 2000; 2010 2020

Crestwood Village first appeared as a census designated place in the 1980 U.S. census.

=== Racial and ethnic composition ===
Crestwood Village CDP, New Jersey – Racial and ethnic composition Note: the US Census treats Hispanic/Latino as an ethnic category. This table excludes Latinos from the racial categories and assigns them to a separate category. Hispanics/Latinos may be of any race.
Race / Ethnicity (NH = Non-Hispanic)	Pop 2000	Pop 2010	Pop 2020	% 2000	% 2010	% 2020
White alone (NH)	8,182	7,512	7,618	97.50%	95.00%	90.41%
Black or African American alone (NH)	64	114	190	0.76%	1.44%	2.25%
Native American or Alaska Native alone (NH)	6	8	12	0.07%	0.10%	0.14%
Asian alone (NH)	19	51	124	0.23%	0.64%	1.47%
Native Hawaiian or Pacific Islander alone (NH)	0	1	2	0.00%	0.01%	0.02%
Other race alone (NH)	0	6	14	0.00%	0.08%	0.17%
Mixed race or Multiracial (NH)	27	46	119	0.32%	0.58%	1.41%
Hispanic or Latino (any race)	94	169	347	1.12%	2.14%	4.12%
Total	8,392	7,907	8,426	100.00%	100.00%	100.00%

=== 2020 census ===
As of the 2020 census, Crestwood Village had a population of 8,426. The median age was 72.2 years. About 0.7% of residents were under the age of 18, while 72.9% were 65 years of age or older. For every 100 females, there were 65.7 males, and for every 100 females age 18 and over, there were 65.6 males.

100.0% of residents lived in urban areas, while 0.0% lived in rural areas.

There were 5,841 households, of which 1.1% had children under the age of 18 living in them. Of all households, 27.0% were married-couple households, 20.5% were households with a male householder and no spouse or partner present, and 49.5% were households with a female householder and no spouse or partner present. About 60.2% of all households were made up of individuals, and 49.4% had someone living alone who was 65 years of age or older.

There were 6,639 housing units, of which 12.0% were vacant. The homeowner vacancy rate was 3.7% and the rental vacancy rate was 8.8%.

=== 2010 census ===
The 2010 United States census counted 7,907 people, 5,615 households, and 1,960 families in the CDP. The population density was 1,840.0 people per square mile (710.4 people/km^{2}). There were 6,702 housing units at an average density of 1,559.6 units per square mile (602.2 units/km^{2}). The racial makeup was 96.93% (7,664) White, 1.47% (116) Black or African American, 0.10% (8) Native American, 0.64% (51) Asian, 0.01% (1) Pacific Islander, 0.20% (16) from other races, and 0.64% (51) from two or more races. Hispanic or Latino of any race were 2.14% (169) of the population.

Of the 5,615 households, 0.1% had children under the age of 18; 28.8% were married couples living together; 5.1% had a female householder with no husband present and 65.1% were non-families. Of all households, 61.9% were made up of individuals and 51.9% had someone living alone who was 65 years of age or older. The average household size was 1.41 and the average family size was 2.07.

0.3% of the population were under the age of 18, 0.6% from 18 to 24, 2.0% from 25 to 44, 19.8% from 45 to 64, and 77.4% who were 65 years of age or older. The median age was 74.4 years. For every 100 females, the population had 59.5 males. For every 100 females ages 18 and older there were 59.4 males.

=== 2000 census ===
As of the 2000 United States census there were 8,392 people, 5,694 households, and 2,277 families living in the CDP. The population density was 738.1 people/km^{2} (1,912 people/mi^{2}). There were 6,448 housing units at an average density of 567.1 units/km^{2} (1,469 units/mi^{2}). The racial makeup of the CDP was 98.38% White, 0.76% African American, 0.07% Native American, 0.24% Asian, 0.14% from other races, and 0.41% from two or more races. Hispanic or Latino of any race were 1.12% of the population.

There were 5,694 households, out of which 0.2% had children under the age of 18 living with them, 35.5% were married couples living together, 3.5% had a female householder with no husband present, and 60.0% were non-families. 58.1% of all households were made up of individuals, and 53.0% had someone living alone who was 65 years of age or older. The average household size was 1.45 and the average family size was 2.08.

In the CDP the population was spread out, with 0.4% under the age of 18, 0.3% from 18 to 24, 2.1% from 25 to 44, 13.3% from 45 to 64, and 84.0% who were 65 years of age or older. The median age was 76 years. For every 100 females, there were 57.3 males. For every 100 females age 18 and over, there were 57.2 males.

The median income for a household in the CDP was $22,615, and the median income for a family was $30,617. Males had a median income of $33,875 versus $26,359 for females. The per capita income for the CDP was $23,841. About 2.2% of families and 7.1% of the population were below the poverty line, including none of those under age 18 and 5.8% of those age 65 or over.
