= Pine Lake Park, New Jersey =

Populated place in Ocean County, New Jersey, US

- Census-designated place
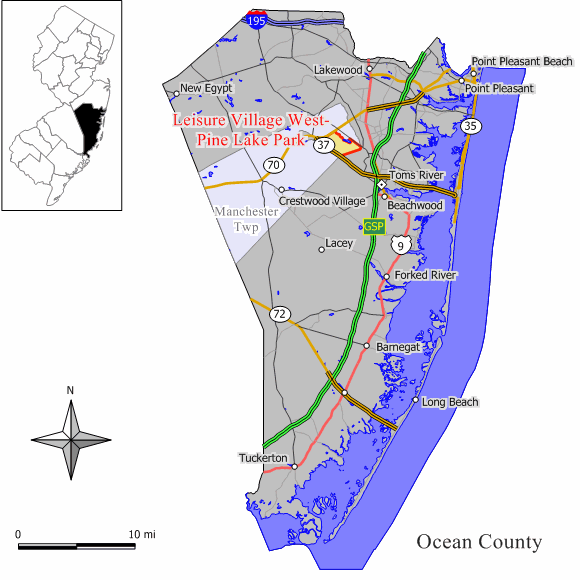
- Map of the former Leisure Village West-Pine Lake Park CDP in Ocean County. Inset: Location of Ocean County in New Jersey.

- Location in Ocean County Location in New Jersey Location in the United States
- Coordinates: 40.001605°N 74.258977°W
- Country: United States
- State: New Jersey
- County: Ocean
- Township: Manchester

Area
  - Total: 2.55 sq mi (6.61 km^{2})
  - Land: 2.48 sq mi (6.42 km^{2})
  - Water: 0.073 sq mi (0.19 km^{2}) 2.87%
- Elevation: 69 ft (21 m)

Population (2020)
  - Total: 8,913
  - Density: 3,593.0/sq mi (1,387.28/km^{2})
- Time zone: UTC−05:00 (Eastern (EST))
  - Summer (DST): UTC−04:00 (Eastern (EDT))
- FIPS code: 34-58830
- GNIS feature ID: 02584017

Pine Lake Park is an unincorporated community and census-designated place (CDP) located within Manchester Township, in Ocean County, in the U.S. state of New Jersey. Until the 2000 census, the CDP had been part of the Leisure Village West-Pine Lake Park CDP, which was split for the 2010 enumeration into separate CDPs for Leisure Village West and Pine Lake Park. As of the 2020 census, Pine Lake Park had a population of 8,913.

== Geography ==
According to the United States Census Bureau, the CDP had a total area of 2.570 square miles (6.657 km^{2}), all of which was land.

== Demographics ==
Historical population
Census	Pop.	Note	%±
2010	8,707		—
2020	8,913		2.4%
Population sources: 2010 2020

Pine Lake Park first appeared as a census designated place in the 2010 U.S. census formed from part of the deleted Leisure Village West-Pine Lake Park CDP.

=== Racial and ethnic composition ===
Pine Lake Park CDP, New Jersey – Racial and ethnic composition Note: the US Census treats Hispanic/Latino as an ethnic category. This table excludes Latinos from the racial categories and assigns them to a separate category. Hispanics/Latinos may be of any race.
Race / Ethnicity (NH = Non-Hispanic)	Pop 2010	Pop 2020	% 2010	% 2020
White alone (NH)	6,930	6,336	79.59%	71.09%
Black or African American alone (NH)	453	501	5.20%	5.62%
Native American or Alaska Native alone (NH)	9	11	0.10%	0.12%
Asian alone (NH)	354	394	4.07%	4.42%
Native Hawaiian or Pacific Islander alone (NH)	4	0	0.05%	0.00%
Other race alone (NH)	8	37	0.09%	0.42%
Mixed race or Multiracial (NH)	139	358	1.60%	4.02%
Hispanic or Latino (any race)	810	1,276	9.30%	14.32%
Total	8,707	8,913	100.00%	100.00%

=== 2020 census ===
As of the 2020 census, Pine Lake Park had a population of 8,913. The median age was 40.2 years. 22.9% of residents were under the age of 18 and 15.5% were 65 years of age or older. For every 100 females, there were 95.7 males, and for every 100 females age 18 and over, there were 93.2 males.

100.0% of residents lived in urban areas, while 0.0% lived in rural areas.

There were 3,029 households, of which 35.4% had children under the age of 18 living in them. Of all households, 57.6% were married-couple households, 12.4% were households with a male householder and no spouse or partner present, and 23.2% were households with a female householder and no spouse or partner present. About 18.5% of all households were made up of individuals, and 9.9% had someone living alone who was 65 years of age or older.

There were 3,189 housing units, of which 5.0% were vacant. The homeowner vacancy rate was 1.9% and the rental vacancy rate was 11.0%.

=== 2010 census ===
The 2010 United States census counted 8,707 people, 2,859 households, and 2,230 families in the CDP. The population density was 3,387.9 per square mile (1,308.1/km^{2}). There were 3,017 housing units at an average density of 1,173.9 per square mile (453.2/km^{2}). The racial makeup was 85.56% (7,450) White, 5.49% (478) Black or African American, 0.11% (10) Native American, 4.09% (356) Asian, 0.05% (4) Pacific Islander, 2.60% (226) from other races, and 2.10% (183) from two or more races. Hispanic or Latino of any race were 9.30% (810) of the population.

Of the 2,859 households, 39.2% had children under the age of 18; 61.6% were married couples living together; 11.4% had a female householder with no husband present and 22.0% were non-families. Of all households, 17.3% were made up of individuals and 8.0% had someone living alone who was 65 years of age or older. The average household size was 2.97 and the average family size was 3.37.

26.0% of the population were under the age of 18, 7.9% from 18 to 24, 28.7% from 25 to 44, 26.9% from 45 to 64, and 10.5% who were 65 years of age or older. The median age was 37.7 years. For every 100 females, the population had 92.8 males. For every 100 females ages 18 and older there were 88.6 males.
