= Seabrook =

Seabrook may refer to:

== Places ==
=== Australia ===
- Seabrook, Victoria
- Seabrook, Tasmania

=== United Kingdom ===
- Seabrook, Kent

=== United States ===
- Seabrook, Georgia
- Seabrook, Maryland
  - Seabrook station (MARC)
- Seabrook, Massachusetts
- Seabrook, New Hampshire
  - Seabrook Station Nuclear Power Plant
- Seabrook, New Jersey
- Seabrook Farms, New Jersey
- Seabrook, South Carolina, in Beaufort County
- Seabrook Island, South Carolina, in Charleston County
- Seabrook, Texas
- Seabrook, Washington

== Other ==
- Seabrook, a fictional location in the Disney Channel Zombies franchise
- MV Seabrook, an Empire F type coaster in service with Seaway Coasters Ltd, 1946–54
- Seabrook Bridge in New Orleans
- Seabrook Potato Crisps, a brand of crisps in the United Kingdom

== People with the surname Seabrook ==
- Seabrook (surname)
