= Silver Lake, Cumberland County, New Jersey =

Populated place in Cumberland County, New Jersey, US

Silver Lake, New Jersey
- Census-designated place
- Location in Cumberland County Location in New Jersey Location in the United States
- Coordinates: 39°28′1″N 75°14′28″W
- Country: United States
- State: New Jersey
- County: Cumberland
- Township: Upper Deerfield

Area
  - Total: 1.44 sq mi (3.74 km^{2})
  - Land: 1.43 sq mi (3.71 km^{2})
  - Water: 0.015 sq mi (0.04 km^{2})
- Elevation: 72 ft (22 m)

Population (2020)
  - Total: 1,435
  - Density: 1,003/sq mi (387.3/km^{2})
- Time zone: UTC−05:00 (Eastern (EST))
  - Summer (DST): UTC−04:00 (EDT)
- ZIP Code: 08302 (Bridgeton)
- Area code: 856
- FIPS code: 34-67583
- GNIS feature ID: 2812755

Silver Lake is a census-designated place (CDP) in Cumberland County, in the U.S. state of New Jersey. It is in the northern part of the county, in the southwest part of Upper Deerfield Township. It is bordered to the west by the Cohansey River, which forms the boundary with Hopewell Township, to the north by Seeley, and to the south by Sunset Lake. Bridgeton, the Cumberland county seat, is 3 miles (5 km) to the south.

Silver Lake was first listed as a CDP prior to the 2020 census.

== Demographics ==
Historical population
Census	Pop.	Note	%±
2020	1,435		—
U.S. Decennial Census

Silver Lake was first listed as a census designated place in the 2020 U.S. census.

Silver Lake CDP, Cumberland County, New Jersey – Racial and ethnic composition Note: the US Census treats Hispanic/Latino as an ethnic category. This table excludes Latinos from the racial categories and assigns them to a separate category. Hispanics/Latinos may be of any race.
Race / Ethnicity (NH = Non-Hispanic)	Pop 2020	2020
White alone (NH)	1,064	74.15%
Black or African American alone (NH)	78	5.44%
Native American or Alaska Native alone (NH)	18	1.25%
Asian alone (NH)	75	5.23%
Native Hawaiian or Pacific Islander alone (NH)	0	0.00%
Other race alone (NH)	2	0.14%
Mixed race or Multiracial (NH)	59	4.11%
Hispanic or Latino (any race)	139	9.69%
Total	1,435	100.00%

== Education ==
Students are zoned to Upper Deerfield Township School District (for elementary school) and Cumberland Regional School District (for high school).
