= Seabrook Farms, New Jersey =

Populated place in Cumberland County, New Jersey, US

- Census-designated place
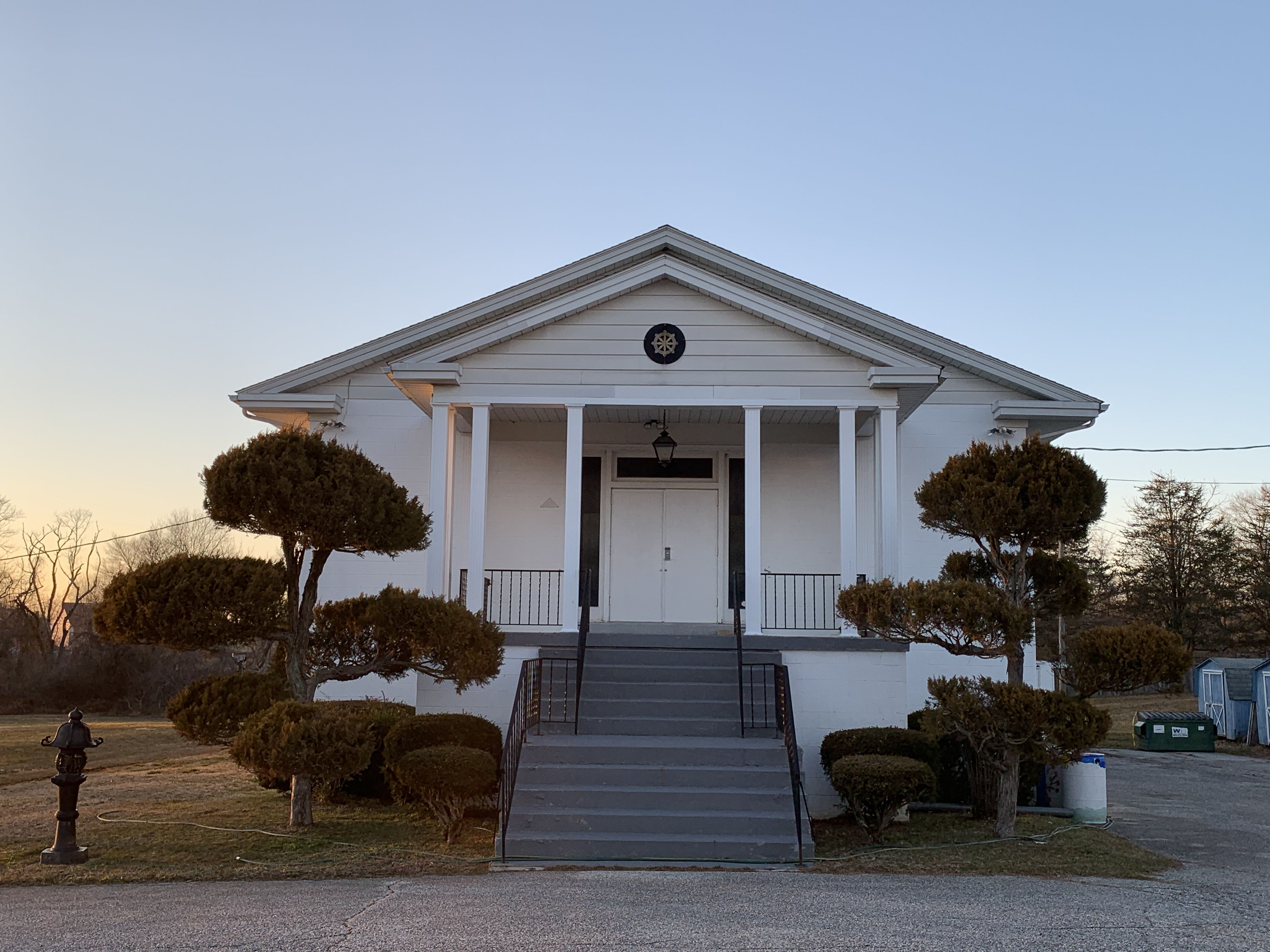
- Seabrook Buddhist Temple

- Map of Seabrook Farms highlighted within Cumberland County. Right: Location of Cumberland County in New Jersey.

- Location in Cumberland County Location in New Jersey Location in the United States
- Coordinates: 39.501155°N 75.220355°W
- Country: United States
- State: New Jersey
- County: Cumberland
- Township: Upper Deerfield

Area
  - Total: 2.18 sq mi (5.64 km^{2})
  - Land: 2.17 sq mi (5.61 km^{2})
  - Water: 0.012 sq mi (0.03 km^{2}) 0.47%
- Elevation: 108 ft (33 m)

Population (2020)
  - Total: 1,508
  - Density: 695.8/sq mi (268.64/km^{2})
- Time zone: UTC−05:00 (Eastern (EST))
  - Summer (DST): UTC−04:00 (EDT)
- FIPS code: 34-66300
- GNIS feature ID: 02390267

Seabrook Farms is an unincorporated community and census-designated place (CDP) located within Seabrook, which is in turn located in Upper Deerfield Township, in Cumberland County, in the U.S. state of New Jersey. It is part of the Vineland-Bridgeton metropolitan statistical area for statistical purposes. As of the 2020 census, Seabrook Farms had a population of 1,508. Seabrook Farms is named after Charles F. Seabrook, a businessman who ran a truck farm that was one of the state's largest.

== Geography ==
According to the United States Census Bureau, Seabrook Farms had a total area of 2.177 square miles (5.64 km^{2}), including 2.167 square miles (5.61 km^{2}) of it is land and 0.010 square miles (0.026 km^{2}) of water (0.47%) is water.

=== Climate ===
Climate data for Seabrook Farms, New Jersey (1991–2020)
| Month | Jan | Feb | Mar | Apr | May | Jun | Jul | Aug | Sep | Oct | Nov | Dec | Year |
|---|---|---|---|---|---|---|---|---|---|---|---|---|---|
| Mean daily maximum °F (°C) | 41.1 (5.1) | 43.6 (6.4) | 51.3 (10.7) | 63.2 (17.3) | 72.6 (22.6) | 81.6 (27.6) | 86.2 (30.1) | 84.4 (29.1) | 78.4 (25.8) | 66.5 (19.2) | 55.5 (13.1) | 45.9 (7.7) | 64.2 (17.9) |
| Daily mean °F (°C) | 33.1 (0.6) | 35.1 (1.7) | 42.2 (5.7) | 52.8 (11.6) | 62.5 (16.9) | 71.8 (22.1) | 76.7 (24.8) | 74.9 (23.8) | 68.5 (20.3) | 56.7 (13.7) | 46.5 (8.1) | 37.9 (3.3) | 54.9 (12.7) |
| Mean daily minimum °F (°C) | 25.0 (−3.9) | 26.7 (−2.9) | 33.2 (0.7) | 42.4 (5.8) | 52.4 (11.3) | 61.9 (16.6) | 67.3 (19.6) | 65.3 (18.5) | 58.6 (14.8) | 46.9 (8.3) | 37.6 (3.1) | 29.9 (−1.2) | 45.6 (7.6) |
| Average precipitation inches (mm) | 3.37 (86) | 2.73 (69) | 4.58 (116) | 3.67 (93) | 3.61 (92) | 4.41 (112) | 4.56 (116) | 4.93 (125) | 4.25 (108) | 4.00 (102) | 3.19 (81) | 4.40 (112) | 47.7 (1,212) |
| Average snowfall inches (cm) | 3.9 (9.9) | 3.6 (9.1) | 1.8 (4.6) | 0.2 (0.51) | 0.0 (0.0) | 0.0 (0.0) | 0.0 (0.0) | 0.0 (0.0) | 0.0 (0.0) | 0.0 (0.0) | 0.1 (0.25) | 2.2 (5.6) | 11.8 (29.96) |
Source: NOAA

== Demographics ==
Historical population
| Census | Pop. | Note | %± |
|---|---|---|---|
| 1950 | 2,284 | | — |
| 1960 | 1,798 | | −21.3% |
| 1970 | 1,569 | | −12.7% |
| 1980 | 1,411 | | −10.1% |
| 1990 | 1,457 | | 3.3% |
| 2000 | 1,719 | | 18.0% |
| 2010 | 1,484 | | −13.7% |
| 2020 | 1,508 | | 1.6% |
Population sources: 1950 1960 1970; 1980 1990 2000; 2010 2020

Seabrook Farms first appeared as an unincorporated community in the 1950 U.S. census; and then listed as a census designated place in the 1980 U.S. census.

=== Census 2010 ===
The 2010 United States census counted 1,484 people, 508 households, and 388 families in the CDP. The population density was 684.7 people per square mile (264.4 people/km^{2}). There were 548 housing units at an average density of 252.8 units per square mile (97.6 units/km^{2}). The racial makeup was 32.41% (481) White, 44.54% (661) Black or African American, 1.21% (18) Native American, 1.15% (17) Asian, 0.00% (0) Pacific Islander, 13.01% (193) from other races, and 7.68% (114) from two or more races. Hispanic or Latino of any race were 21.50% (319) of the population.

Of the 508 households, 46.1% had children under the age of 18; 28.9% were married couples living together; 40.7% had a female householder with no husband present and 23.6% were non-families. Of all households, 19.5% were made up of individuals and 5.1% had someone living alone who was 65 years of age or older. The average household size was 2.92 and the average family size was 3.31.

37.1% of the population were under the age of 18, 11.4% from 18 to 24, 25.1% from 25 to 44, 20.3% from 45 to 64, and 6.1% who were 65 years of age or older. The median age was 25.9 years. For every 100 females, the population had 84.8 males. For every 100 females ages 18 and older there were 73.4 males.

=== Census 2000 ===
At the 2000 census there were 1,719 people, 582 households, and 451 families residing in Seabrook Farms. The population density was 304.5 people/km^{2} (789 people/mi^{2}). There were 607 housing units at an average density of 107.5 units/km^{2} (278 units/mi^{2}). The racial makeup of Seabrook Farms was 33.86% White, 54.22% African American, 0.76% Native American, 2.04% Asian, 0.06% Pacific Islander, 6.52% from other races, and 2.56% from two or more races. Hispanic or Latino of any race were 12.91% of the population.

Of the 582 households, 55.3% had children under the age of 18 living with them, 29.7% were married couples living together, 41.4% had a female householder with no husband present, and 22.5% were non-families. 19.8% of households were one person, and 8.4% were one person aged 65 or older. The average household size was 2.95 and the average family size was 3.33.

In Seabrook Farms the population was spread out, with 42.8% under the age of 18, 10.1% from 18 to 24, 26.2% from 25 to 44, 14.9% from 45 to 64, and 6.1% 65 or older. The median age was 23 years. For every 100 females, there were 85.2 males. For every 100 females age 18 and over, there were 67.5 males.

The median household income was in Seabrook Farms was $16,558, and the median family income was $22,500. Males had a median income of $24,479 versus $24,643 for females. The per capita income for Seabrook Farms was $12,499. About 28.3% of families and 34.3% of the population were below the poverty line, including 42.2% of those under age 18 and 16.8% of those age 65 or over.

== Education ==
Students are zoned to Upper Deerfield Township School District (for elementary school) and Cumberland Regional School District (for high school).
