= Carlls Corner, New Jersey =

Populated place in Cumberland County, New Jersey, US

- Census-designated place
- Location in Cumberland County Location in New Jersey Location in the United States
- Coordinates: 39°27′47″N 75°12′20″W
- Country: United States
- State: New Jersey
- County: Cumberland
- Township: Upper Deerfield

Area
  - Total: 1.67 sq mi (4.32 km^{2})
  - Land: 1.67 sq mi (4.32 km^{2})
  - Water: 0 sq mi (0.00 km^{2})
- Elevation: 108 ft (33 m)

Population (2020)
  - Total: 911
  - Density: 545.7/sq mi (210.71/km^{2})
- Time zone: UTC−05:00 (Eastern (EST))
  - Summer (DST): UTC−04:00 (EDT)
- ZIP Code: 08302 (Bridgeton)
- Area code: 856
- FIPS code: 34-10450
- GNIS feature ID: 2806059

Carlls Corner is a census-designated place (CDP) located in Upper Deerfield Township in Cumberland County, in the U.S. state of New Jersey. It is bordered at its southwest corner by the city of Bridgeton, the county seat.

New Jersey Routes 77 and 56 intersect at the center of the community, with NJ 56 leading east 10 miles (16 km) to Vineland and NJ 77 leading south 3 miles (5 km) to the center of Bridgeton and north 20 miles (32 km) to Mullica Hill.

Carlls Corner was first listed as a CDP prior to the 2020 census with a population of 911.

== Demographics ==
Historical population
Census	Pop.	Note	%±
2020	911		—
U.S. Decennial Census; 2020

Carlls Corner first appeared as a census designated place in the 2020 U.S. census.

=== 2020 census ===
Carlls Corner CDP, New Jersey – Racial and ethnic composition Note: the US Census treats Hispanic/Latino as an ethnic category. This table excludes Latinos from the racial categories and assigns them to a separate category. Hispanics/Latinos may be of any race.
Race / Ethnicity (NH = Non-Hispanic)	Pop 2020	% 2020
White alone (NH)	637	69.92%
Black or African American alone (NH)	42	4.61%
Native American or Alaska Native alone (NH)	7	0.77%
Asian alone (NH)	32	3.51%
Native Hawaiian or Pacific Islander alone (NH)	0	0.00%
Other race alone (NH)	2	0.22%
Mixed race Multiracial (NH)	46	5.05%
Hispanic or Latino (any race)	145	15.92%
Total	911	100.00%

== Education ==
Students are zoned to Upper Deerfield Township School District (for elementary school) and Cumberland Regional School District (for high school).
