= Sunset Lake, New Jersey =

Populated place in Cumberland County, New Jersey, US

- Census-designated place
- Location in Cumberland County Location in New Jersey Location in the United States
- Coordinates: 39°27′7″N 75°14′1″W
- Country: United States
- State: New Jersey
- County: Cumberland
- Township: Upper Deerfield

Area
  - Total: 0.66 sq mi (1.72 km^{2})
  - Land: 0.60 sq mi (1.55 km^{2})
  - Water: 0.066 sq mi (0.17 km^{2})
- Elevation: 70 ft (21 m)

Population (2020)
  - Total: 494
  - Density: 826.4/sq mi (319.08/km^{2})
- Time zone: UTC−05:00 (Eastern (EST))
  - Summer (DST): UTC−04:00 (EDT)
- ZIP Code: 08302 (Bridgeton)
- Area code: 856
- FIPS code: 34-71628
- GNIS feature ID: 2806195

Sunset Lake is a census-designated place (CDP) in Cumberland County, in the U.S. state of New Jersey. As of the 2020 census, Sunset Lake had a population of 494. It is in the northern part of the county, in the southwest corner of Upper Deerfield Township. It is bordered to the south by the city of Bridgeton, the county seat. It is bordered to the east by Laurel Heights, to the north by Silver Lake, and to the west by Sunset Lake, an impoundment on the Cohansey River. Across the lake is Hopewell Township.

Sunset Lake was first listed as a CDP prior to the 2020 census.

== Demographics ==
Historical population
Census	Pop.	Note	%±
2020	494		—
U.S. Decennial Census

Sunset Lake was first listed as a census designated place in the 2020 U.S. census.

Sunset Lake CDP, New Jersey – Racial and ethnic composition Note: the US Census treats Hispanic/Latino as an ethnic category. This table excludes Latinos from the racial categories and assigns them to a separate category. Hispanics/Latinos may be of any race.
Race / Ethnicity (NH = Non-Hispanic)	Pop 2020	2020
White alone (NH)	362	73.28%
Black or African American alone (NH)	11	2.23%
Native American or Alaska Native alone (NH)	3	0.61%
Asian alone (NH)	12	2.43%
Native Hawaiian or Pacific Islander alone (NH)	0	0.00%
Other race alone (NH)	2	0.40%
Mixed race or Multiracial (NH)	33	6.68%
Hispanic or Latino (any race)	71	14.37%
Total	494	100.00%

== Education ==
Students are zoned to Upper Deerfield Township School District (for elementary school) and Cumberland Regional School District (for high school).
