= Laurel Heights, New Jersey =

Populated place in Cumberland County, New Jersey, US

- Census-designated place
- Location in Cumberland County Location in New Jersey Location in the United States
- Coordinates: 39°27′25″N 75°13′25″W
- Country: United States
- State: New Jersey
- County: Cumberland
- Township: Upper Deerfield

Area
  - Total: 0.26 sq mi (0.67 km^{2})
  - Land: 0.26 sq mi (0.67 km^{2})
  - Water: 0 sq mi (0.00 km^{2})
- Elevation: 90 ft (27 m)

Population (2020)
  - Total: 380
  - Density: 1,471.9/sq mi (568.31/km^{2})
- Time zone: UTC−05:00 (Eastern (EST))
  - Summer (DST): UTC−04:00 (EDT)
- ZIP Code: 08302 (Bridgeton)
- Area code: 856
- FIPS code: 34-39045
- GNIS feature ID: 2806114

Laurel Heights is a census-designated place (CDP) located in Cumberland County, in the U.S. state of New Jersey. It is in the northern part of the county, in the southwestern part of Upper Deerfield Township, 2 miles (3 km) north of Bridgeton, the county seat. It is bordered to the west by the community of Sunset Lake.

As of the 2020 census, Laurel Heights had a population of 380.

Laurel Heights was first listed as a CDP prior to the 2020 census.

== Demographics ==
Historical population
| Census | Pop. | Note | %± |
|---|---|---|---|
| 2020 | 380 | | — |
U.S. Decennial Census; 2020

Laurel Heights was first listed as a census designated place in the 2020 U.S. census.

Laurel Heights CDP, New Jersey – Racial and ethnic composition Note: the US Census treats Hispanic/Latino as an ethnic category. This table excludes Latinos from the racial categories and assigns them to a separate category. Hispanics/Latinos may be of any race.
| Race / Ethnicity (NH = Non-Hispanic) | Pop 2020 | 2020 |
|---|---|---|
| White alone (NH) | 253 | 66.58% |
| Black or African American alone (NH) | 18 | 4.74% |
| Native American or Alaska Native alone (NH) | 13 | 3.42% |
| Asian alone (NH) | 6 | 1.58% |
| Native Hawaiian or Pacific Islander alone (NH) | 0 | 0.00% |
| Other race alone (NH) | 0 | 0.00% |
| Mixed race or Multiracial (NH) | 12 | 3.16% |
| Hispanic or Latino (any race) | 78 | 20.53% |
| Total | 380 | 100.00% |

As of 2020, the population was 380.

== Education ==
Students are zoned to Upper Deerfield Township School District (for elementary school) and Cumberland Regional School District (for high school).
