= Deerfield Street, New Jersey =

Populated place in Cumberland County, New Jersey, US

- Census-designated place
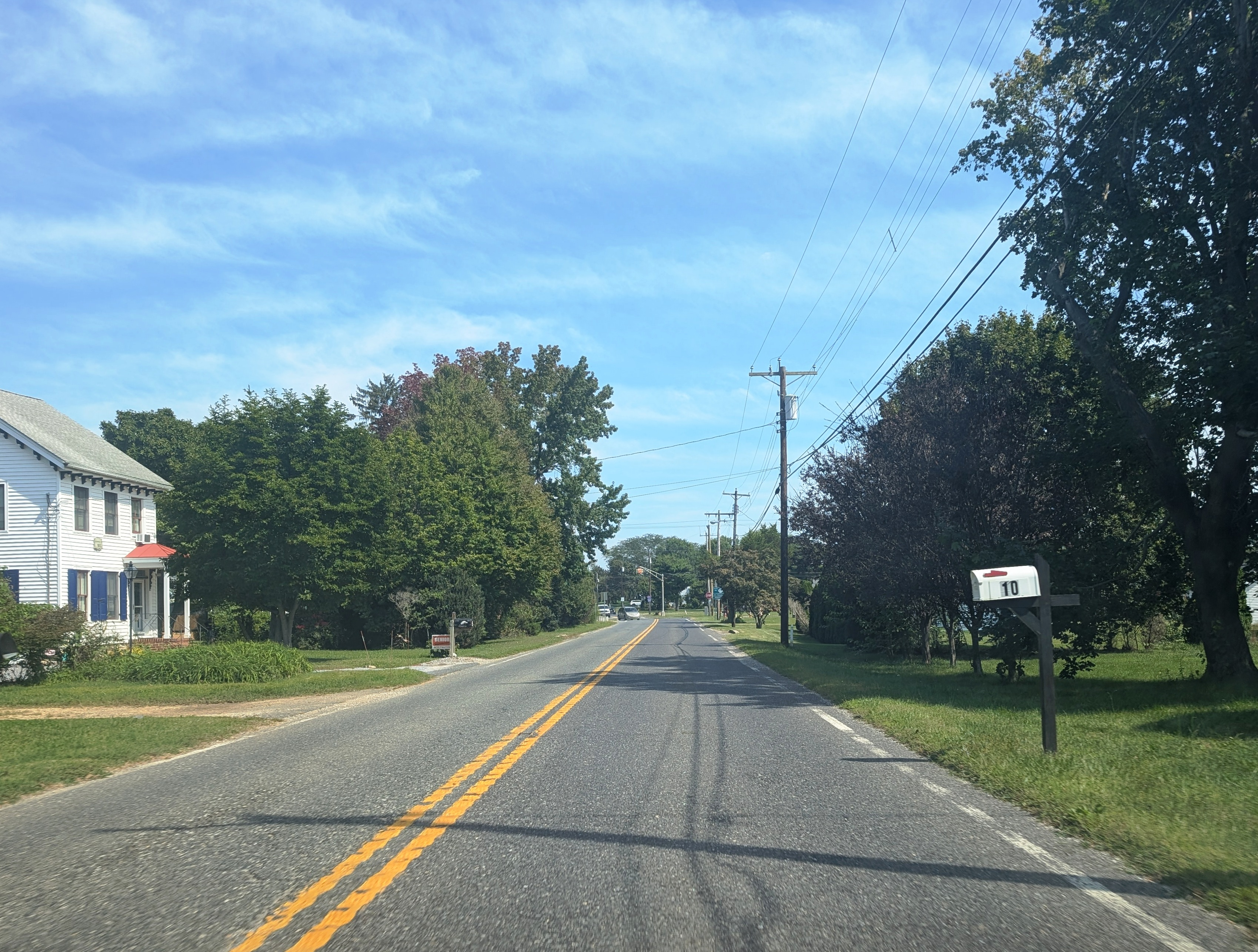
- CR 540 eastbound in Deerfield Street

- Location in Cumberland County Location in New Jersey Location in the United States
- Coordinates: 39°31′25″N 75°14′10″W
- Country: United States
- State: New Jersey
- County: Cumberland
- Township: Upper Deerfield

Area
  - Total: 1.76 sq mi (4.55 km^{2})
  - Land: 1.76 sq mi (4.55 km^{2})
  - Water: 0 sq mi (0.00 km^{2})
- Elevation: 115 ft (35 m)

Population (2020)
  - Total: 230
  - Density: 131.0/sq mi (50.57/km^{2})
- Time zone: UTC−05:00 (Eastern (EST))
  - Summer (DST): UTC−04:00 (EDT)
- ZIP Code: 08313
- Area code: 856
- FIPS code: 34-16960
- GNIS feature ID: 2806069

Deerfield (also known as Deerfield Street) is an unincorporated community and census-designated place (CDP) located within Upper Deerfield Township, Cumberland County, in the U.S. state of New Jersey. It was first listed as a CDP in the 2020 census with a population of 230.

Deerfield is located on New Jersey Route 77, 6.6 miles (10.6 km) north of Bridgeton. Deerfield has a post office with ZIP Code 08313; the post office uses the Deerfield Street name.

== Demographics ==
Historical population
Census	Pop.	Note	%±
2020	230		—
U.S. Decennial Census; 2020

Deerfield Street first appeared as a census designated place in the 2020 U.S. census.

Deerfield Street CDP, New Jersey – Racial and ethnic composition Note: the US Census treats Hispanic/Latino as an ethnic category. This table excludes Latinos from the racial categories and assigns them to a separate category. Hispanics/Latinos may be of any race.
Race / Ethnicity (NH = Non-Hispanic)	Pop 2020	2020
White alone (NH)	194	84.35%
Black or African American alone (NH)	3	1.30%
Native American or Alaska Native alone (NH)	0	0.00%
Asian alone (NH)	2	0.87%
Native Hawaiian or Pacific Islander alone (NH)	0	0.00%
Other race alone (NH)	4	1.74%
Mixed race or Multiracial (NH)	5	2.17%
Hispanic or Latino (any race)	22	9.57%
Total	230	100.00%

As of 2020, the population of the area was 230.

== Education ==
Students are zoned to Upper Deerfield Township School District (for elementary school) and Cumberland Regional School District (for high school).
