= Deerfield Presbyterian Church =

Historic church in New Jersey, United States

- U.S. National Register of Historic Places
- New Jersey Register of Historic Places
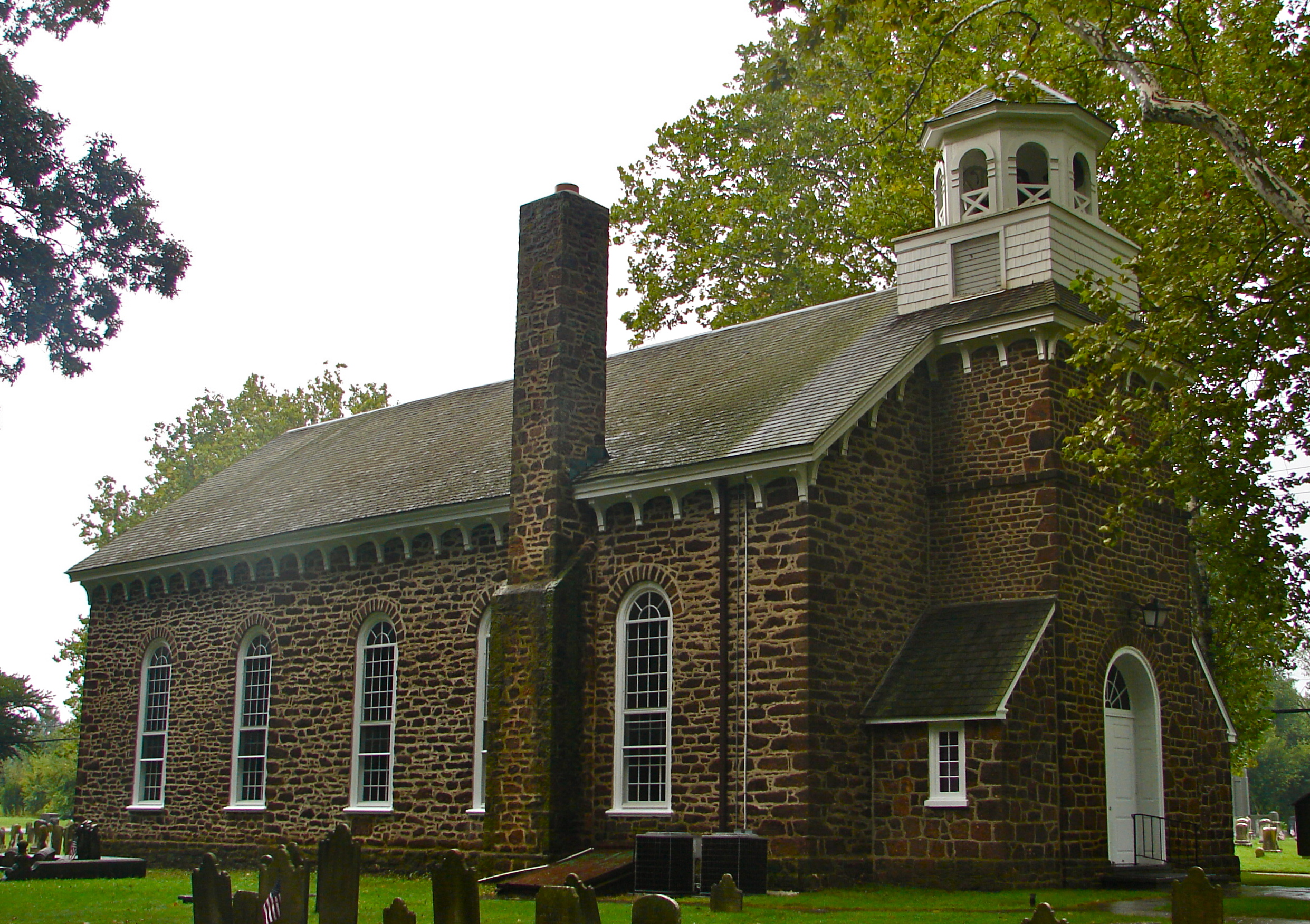

- Location within Cumberland County, New Jersey Location within New Jersey Location within the United States
- Nearest city: Seabrook, New Jersey
- Coordinates: 39°30′42″N 75°14′17″W
- Area: 5.9 acres (2.4 ha)
- Built: 1771
- Architectural style: Colonial
- NRHP reference No.: 80002481
- NJRHP No.
- Added to NRHP: September 29, 1980

Deerfield Presbyterian Church is a historic church in the Seabrook section of Upper Deerfield Township in Cumberland County, New Jersey, United States.

It was built 1771 and added to the National Register of Historic Places in 1980.

== See also ==
- National Register of Historic Places listings in Cumberland County, New Jersey
