= Seabrook (surname) =

Seabrook is a locational surname from Seabrook, Buckinghamshire.

== Notable people with this surname ==
- Arthur Seabrook (1895–1981), English footballer
- Brent Seabrook (born 1985), a Canadian born ice hockey defenceman for the Chicago Blackhawks
- Charles F. Seabrook (1881–1964), American businessman and farming innovator
- David Seabrook (1960–2009), a British writer and journalist
- Ian Seabrook, a Canadian-British underwater cinematographer
- John Seabrook (born 1959), an American writer
- John Jarvis Seabrook (1899–1975), an American pastor and educator
- Jordan Seabrook (born 1987), American soccer player
- Keith Seabrook (born 1988), a Canadian born ice hockey defenceman for the Abbotsford Heat and younger brother of Brent Seabrook
- Larry Seabrook, an American politician, member of New York City Council
- Peter Seabrook (1935–2022), British gardening writer
- Robert Seabrook, early colonial south carolina politician, planter and soldier
- Whitemarsh Benjamin Seabrook (1793–1855), an antebellum Democratic Governor of South Carolina
- William Buehler Seabrook (1884–1945), an American explorer, traveller, and journalist
- Wil Seabrook (born 1976), an American indie rock artist

== See also ==
- Zeebroek, Dutch surname with a similar etymology
