= Seabrook Buddhist Temple =

Buddhist temple in New Jersey, United States

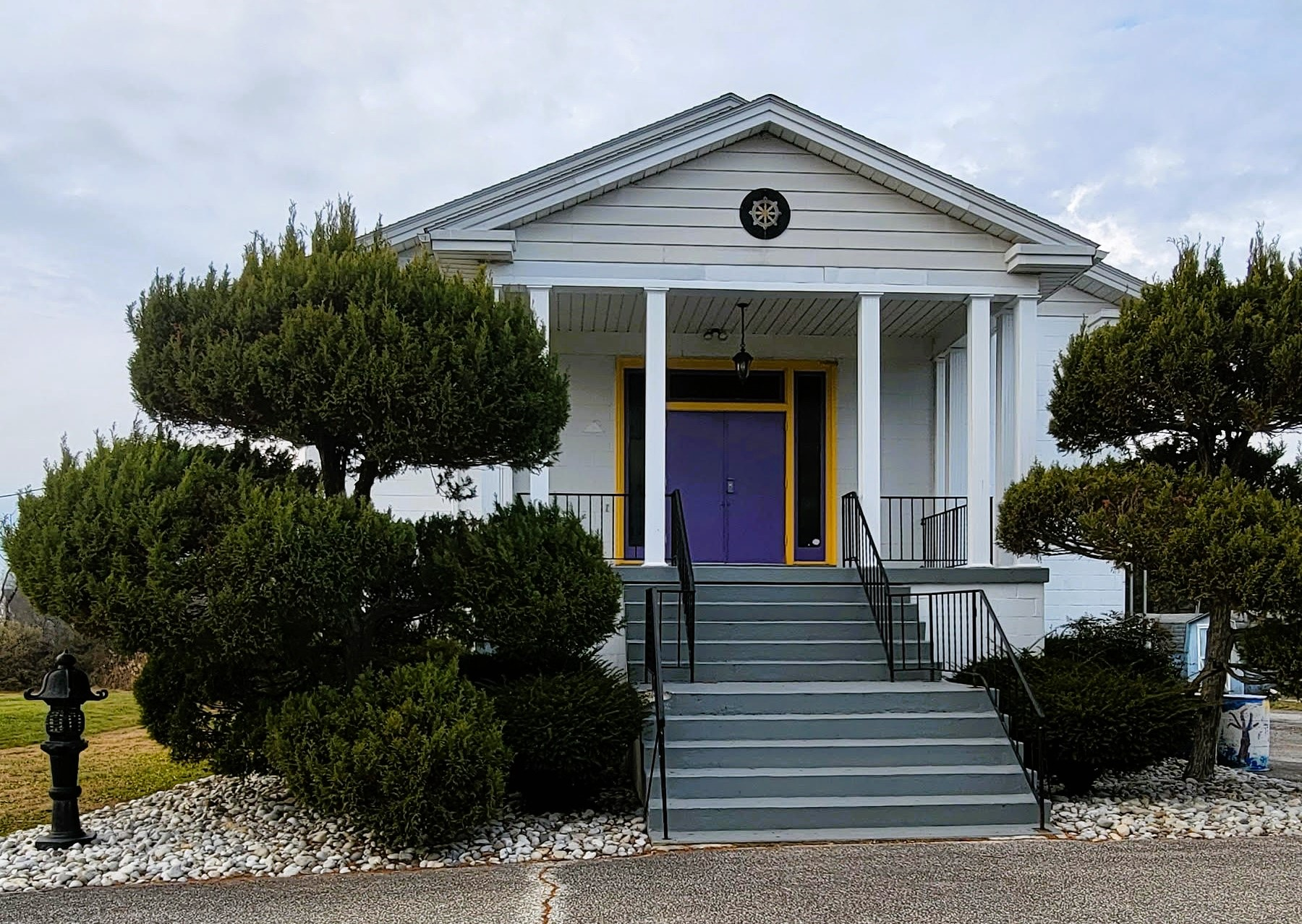

Religion
- Affiliation: Jōdo Shinshū Buddhism
- Leadership: Supervising Minister: Reverend Kurt Rye

Location
- Location: 9 Northville Rd; Upper Deerfield Township, New Jersey
- Country: United States
- Interactive map of Seabrook Buddhist Temple
- Coordinates: 39°30′27.0″N 75°13′16.0″W

Architecture
- Established: 1969

Website
- http://sbtnj.org/

The Seabrook Buddhist Temple is a Buddhist temple of the Jōdo Shinshū Hongwanji-ha sect in the Seabrook section of Upper Deerfield Township, New Jersey. It is an affiliate of the Buddhist Churches of America.

== History ==
=== Establishment ===
Between 1944 and 1947, during the US Government relocation program, about 600 families (an estimated 2,500 Japanese-Americans) had been living and working at Seabrook Farms. In response to the community's spiritual concerns, Shosetsu Tsufura and Zaishin Mukushina began holding non-denominational Buddhist services. Initially services took place in a Child Care Center building, funded by the Federal Public Housing Authority, in Hoover Village, north of the Upper Deerfield Township Municipal Building. The Buddhist church was formed in the winter of 1945 and Kaoru Kamikawa was selected as president of the organization.

In 1946, the Seabrook chapter of the Young Buddhist Association was formed with Kiyomi Nakamura as its chairperson.

By 1965, the Seabrook Buddhist Sangha was officially recognized as an independent temple. On October 6, 1966, members of the congregation planned for the construction of an independent temple building and purchased more than 7 acres of land.

In 1968, the groundbreaking of the current temple began and construction was completed in 1969 The temple was officially dedicated on November 27,1969 with all Buddhist Ministers of the Eastern District in attendance, along with twenty-third Monshu Ōtani Kōshō and Lady Yoshiko Ōtani.

In 1983 the temple was incorporated as a nonprofit organization. 1986 saw the addition of a residential home for the presiding sensei. A meditation garden was constructed in 1988.

=== Outreach ===
The temple served as host for the 2016 Eastern Buddhist League Conference entitled "Come As You Are: Buddhism and Daily Life." The keynote speaker was Kenneth K. Tanaka.

The temple serves as the headquarters for the taiko drumming troupe Hoh Daiko and Seabrook Minyo Dance Group.

== See also ==
- Buddhism in the United States
- Buddhism in the West
- Glossary of Japanese Buddhism
