= Seeley, New Jersey =

Populated place in Cumberland County, New Jersey, US

- Census-designated place
- Location in Cumberland County Location in New Jersey Location in the United States
- Coordinates: 39°29′15″N 75°15′19″W
- Country: United States
- State: New Jersey
- County: Cumberland
- Township: Upper Deerfield

Area
  - Total: 0.58 sq mi (1.51 km^{2})
  - Land: 0.56 sq mi (1.44 km^{2})
  - Water: 0.023 sq mi (0.06 km^{2})
- Elevation: 55 ft (17 m)

Population (2020)
  - Total: 152
  - Density: 272.6/sq mi (105.26/km^{2})
- Time zone: UTC−05:00 (Eastern (EST))
  - Summer (DST): UTC−04:00 (EDT)
- ZIP Code: 08302 (Bridgeton)
- Area code: 856
- FIPS code: 34-66615
- GNIS feature ID: 2806184

Seeley is a census-designated place (CDP) in Cumberland County, in the U.S. state of New Jersey. It is in the northern part of the county, on the west side of Upper Deerfield Township. The western border of the CDP is the Cohansey River, which forms the border with Hopewell Township to the west. Seeley is 5 miles (8 km) north of Bridgeton, the county seat, and 13 miles (21 km) west of Vineland. As of the 2020 census, Seeley had a population of 152.

Seeley was first listed as a CDP prior to the 2020 census.

== Demographics ==
Historical population
Census	Pop.	Note	%±
2020	152		—
U.S. Decennial Census; 2020

Seeley was first listed as a census designated place in the 2020 U.S. census.

Seeley CDP, New Jersey – Racial and ethnic composition Note: the US Census treats Hispanic/Latino as an ethnic category. This table excludes Latinos from the racial categories and assigns them to a separate category. Hispanics/Latinos may be of any race.
Race / Ethnicity (NH = Non-Hispanic)	Pop 2020	2020
White alone (NH)	115	75.66%
Black or African American alone (NH)	5	3.29%
Native American or Alaska Native alone (NH)	0	0.00%
Asian alone (NH)	3	1.97%
Native Hawaiian or Pacific Islander alone (NH)	0	0.00%
Other race alone (NH)	0	0.00%
Mixed race or Multiracial (NH)	10	6.58%
Hispanic or Latino (any race)	19	12.50%
Total	152	100.00%

As of the 2020 census, the population of Seeley was 152.

== Education ==
Students are zoned to Upper Deerfield Township School District (for elementary school) and Cumberland Regional School District (for high school).
