= Zeebroek =

Zeebroek, Zeebroeck or Van Zeebroeck is a Dutch surname. Notable people with the surname include:

- Axel Zeebroek (born 1978), Belgian triathlete
- Boris Zeebroek (born 1985), Belgian musician under the name Bolis Pupul
- Julien Vanzeebroeck (born 1946), Belgian motorcycle racer
- Luc Zeebroek (born 1956), Belgian cartoonist under the name Kamagurka
- Robert Van Zeebroeck (1909–1991), Belgian figure skater

== See also ==
- Seabrook, English-language surname with a similar etymology
