= Deerfield Pike Tollgate House =

Historic house in New Jersey, United States

- U.S. National Register of Historic Places
- New Jersey Register of Historic Places
- Location within Cumberland County, New Jersey Location within New Jersey Location within the United States
- Location: 89 Old Deerfield Pike, Upper Deerfield Township, New Jersey
- Coordinates: 39°27′9″N 75°13′45″W
- Area: less than one acre
- Built: 1853
- Architectural style: Salt Box
- NRHP reference No.: 75001131
- NJRHP No.: 1052

Significant dates
- Added to NRHP: May 21, 1975
- Designated NJRHP: March 25, 1975

Deerfield Pike Tollgate House was located in Upper Deerfield Township, Cumberland County, New Jersey, United States. The house was built in 1853 and was added to the National Register of Historic Places on May 21, 1975. The house was demolished in 2001.

== See also ==
- National Register of Historic Places listings in Cumberland County, New Jersey
