= Arthur Seabrook =

English footballer (1895–1981)

Personal information
- Full name: Arthur Seabrook
- Date of birth: 12 October 1895
- Place of birth: Luton, England
- Date of death: 1981 (aged 85–86)
- Position: Inside forward

Senior career*
Years	Team	Apps	(Gls)
1920–1921	Luton Clarence		
1921–1924	Northampton Town	36	(9)
1924–1928	Halifax Town	104	(35)
1928–1929	Crewe Alexandra	35	(7)
1929–1930	Stockport County	3	(1)
Total		178	(52)
- * Club domestic league appearances and goals

Arthur Seabrook (12 October 1895 – 1981) was an English footballer who played in the Football League for Crewe Alexandra, Halifax Town, Northampton Town and Stockport County.
