= Upper Deerfield Township, New Jersey =

Township in Cumberland County, New Jersey, US

- Township
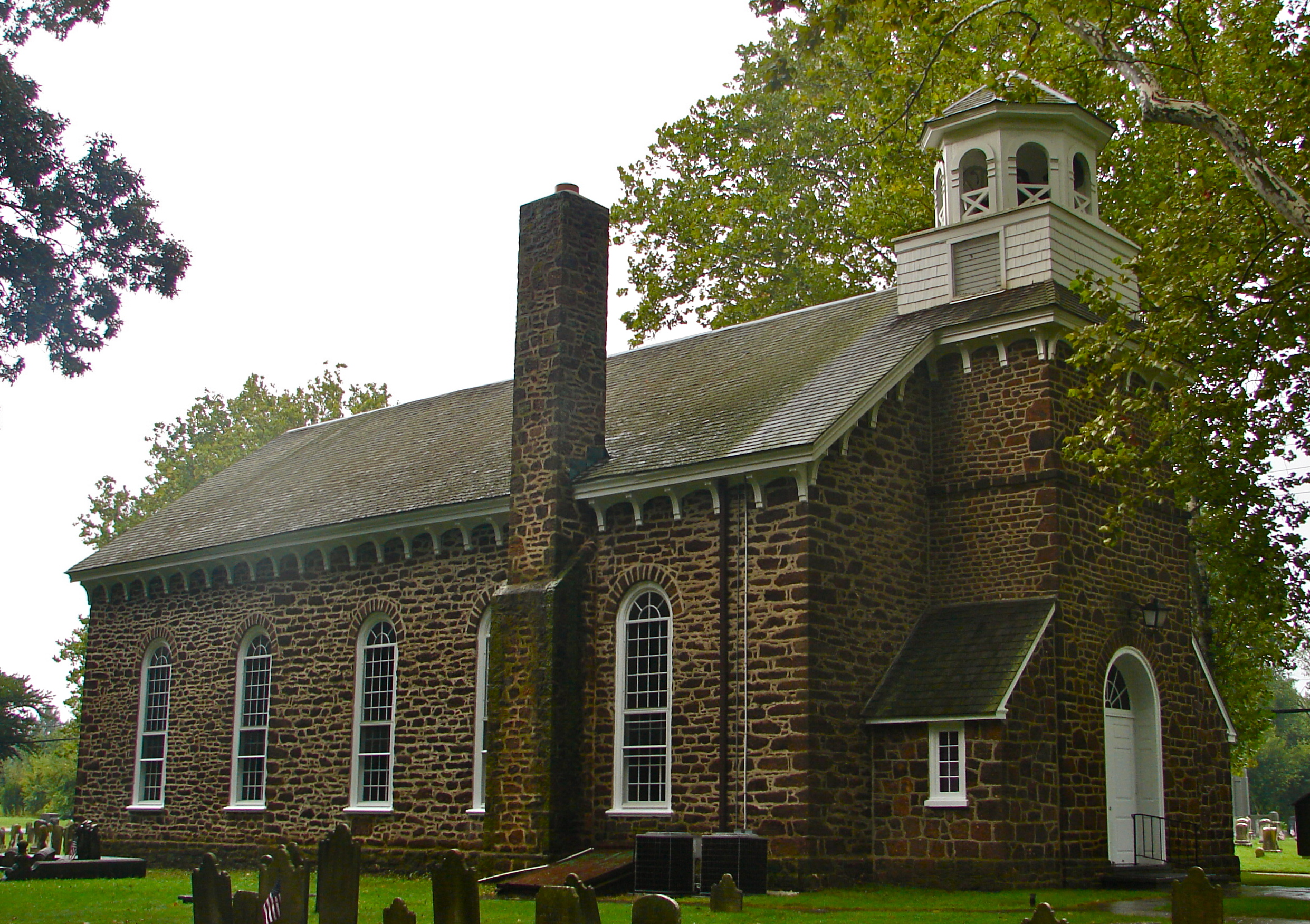
- Deerfield Presbyterian Church

- Seal

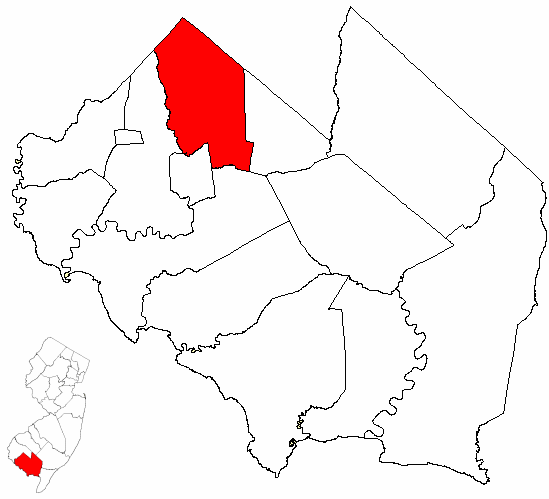
- Location of Upper Deerfield Township in Cumberland County highlighted in red (right). Inset map: Location of Cumberland County in New Jersey highlighted in red (left).

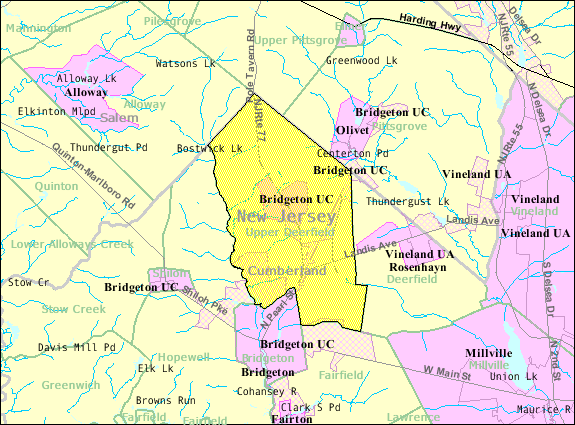
- Census Bureau map of Upper Deerfield Township, New Jersey

- Location in Cumberland County Location in New Jersey Location in the United States
- Coordinates: 39.494923°N 75.216943°W
- Country: United States
- State: New Jersey
- County: Cumberland
- Incorporated: April 3, 1922

Government
  - Type: Township
  - Body: Township Committee
  - Mayor: James P. Crilley (R, term ends December 31, 2023)
  - Administrator / Municipal clerk: Roy J. Spoltore

Area
  - Total: 31.39 sq mi (81.31 km^{2})
  - Land: 31.24 sq mi (80.92 km^{2})
  - Water: 0.15 sq mi (0.39 km^{2}) 0.48%
  - Rank: 82nd of 565 in state 8th of 14 in county
- Elevation: 92 ft (28 m)

Population (2020)
  - Total: 7,645
  - Estimate (2023): 7,830
  - Rank: 304th of 565 in state 4th of 14 in county
  - Density: 244.7/sq mi (94.5/km^{2})
  - Rank: 491st of 565 in state 5th of 14 in county
- Time zone: UTC−05:00 (Eastern (EST))
  - Summer (DST): UTC−04:00 (Eastern (EDT))
- ZIP Code: 08302 – Seabrook
- Area code: 856
- FIPS code: 3401174870
- GNIS feature ID: 0882055
- Website: upperdeerfield.com

Upper Deerfield Township is a township in Cumberland County, in the U.S. state of New Jersey. It is part of the Vineland-Bridgeton metropolitan statistical area, which encompasses those cities and all of Cumberland County for statistical purposes and which constitutes a part of the Philadelphia metropolitan area. As of the 2020 United States census, the township's population was 7,645, a decrease of 15 (−0.2%) from the 2010 census count of 7,660, which in turn reflected an increase of 104 (+1.4%) from the 7,556 counted in the 2000 census.

Upper Deerfield Township was incorporated as a township by an act of the New Jersey Legislature on February 23, 1922, from portions of Deerfield Township, based on the results of a referendum held on April 3, 1922. The township was named for Deerfield Township, which in turn was named for Deerfield, Massachusetts.

It is a dry town, where alcohol cannot be sold, as affirmed by a referendum passed in 1972. Upper Deerfield does not have its own police force and is protected by the New Jersey State Police.

== Geography ==
According to the United States Census Bureau, the township had a total area of 31.39 square miles (81.31 km^{2}), including 31.24 square miles (80.92 km^{2}) of land and 0.15 square miles (0.39 km^{2}) of water (0.48%).

Carlls Corner (2020 population of 911), Deerfield Street (230), Laurel Heights (380), Seabrook Farms (1,580), Seeley (152), Silver Lake (1,435), and Sunset Lake (494) are unincorporated communities and census-designated places (CDPs) within Upper Deerfield Township.

Other unincorporated communities, localities and place names located partially or completely within the township include Beals Mills, Delaby, Finley, Friendship, Grammel Mills, Husted Station, Pleasant Grove, Seabrook, Seeley, Sunset, Watsons Corner and Woodruff.

The township borders Bridgeton, Deerfield Township, Fairfield Township and Hopewell Township in Cumberland County; and Alloway Township, Pittsgrove Township and Upper Pittsgrove Township in Salem County.

== Demographics ==
Historical population
Census	Pop.	Note	%±
1930	2,051		—
1940	2,020		−1.5%
1950	5,203		157.6%
1960	6,040		16.1%
1970	6,648		10.1%
1980	6,810		2.4%
1990	6,927		1.7%
2000	7,556		9.1%
2010	7,660		1.4%
2020	7,645		−0.2%
2023 (est.)	7,830		2.4%
Population sources:1930–2010 1930 1940–2000 2000; 2010 2020

=== 2010 census ===
The 2010 United States census counted 7,660 people, 2,866 households, and 2,104 families in the township. The population density was 246.3 inhabitants per square mile (95.1/km^{2}). There were 3,025 housing units at an average density of 97.3 per square mile (37.6/km^{2}). The racial makeup was 74.67% (5,720) White, 12.96% (993) Black or African American, 1.27% (97) Native American, 2.65% (203) Asian, 0.00% (0) Pacific Islander, 5.38% (412) from other races, and 3.07% (235) from two or more races. Hispanic or Latino of any race were 9.43% (722) of the population.

Of the 2,866 households, 28.4% had children under the age of 18; 53.9% were married couples living together; 15.3% had a female householder with no husband present and 26.6% were non-families. Of all households, 22.1% were made up of individuals and 10.9% had someone living alone who was 65 years of age or older. The average household size was 2.65 and the average family size was 3.08.

23.5% of the population were under the age of 18, 8.2% from 18 to 24, 23.2% from 25 to 44, 28.8% from 45 to 64, and 16.4% who were 65 years of age or older. The median age was 41.2 years. For every 100 females, the population had 93.0 males. For every 100 females ages 18 and older there were 89.6 males.

The Census Bureau's 2006–2010 American Community Survey showed that (in 2010 inflation-adjusted dollars) median household income was $53,646 (with a margin of error of +/− $6,771) and the median family income was $61,974 (+/− $9,964). Males had a median income of $45,532 (+/− $5,633) versus $36,741 (+/− $10,855) for females. The per capita income for the borough was $26,033 (+/− $2,581). About 8.9% of families and 12.4% of the population were below the poverty line, including 18.0% of those under age 18 and 4.8% of those age 65 or over.

=== 2000 census ===
As of the 2000 United States census there were 7,556 people, 2,757 households, and 2,125 families residing in the township. The population density was 242.9 inhabitants per square mile (93.8/km^{2}). There were 2,881 housing units at an average density of 92.6 per square mile (35.8/km^{2}). The racial makeup of the township was 75.77% White, 16.41% African American, 0.81% Native American, 3.06% Asian, 0.01% Pacific Islander, 1.83% from other races, and 2.12% from two or more races. Hispanic or Latino of any race were 4.54% of the population.

There were 2,757 households, out of which 35.8% had children under the age of 18 living with them, 57.1% were married couples living together, 15.6% had a female householder with no husband present, and 22.9% were non-families. 20.0% of all households were made up of individuals, and 10.4% had someone living alone who was 65 years of age or older. The average household size was 2.73 and the average family size was 3.12.

In the township the population was spread out, with 27.8% under the age of 18, 7.4% from 18 to 24, 25.5% from 25 to 44, 25.1% from 45 to 64, and 14.2% who were 65 years of age or older. The median age was 38 years. For every 100 females, there were 94.1 males. For every 100 females age 18 and over, there were 87.5 males.

The median income for a household in the township was $47,861, and the median income for a family was $51,472. Males had a median income of $37,064 versus $23,719 for females. The per capita income for the township was $18,884. About 10.1% of families and 13.7% of the population were below the poverty line, including 23.2% of those under age 18 and 10.8% of those age 65 or over.

== Parks and recreation ==
Sunset Lake is a reservoir located primarily in Hopewell Township and Upper Deerfield Township that was created by damming a stream that feeds to the area from Seeley Lake.

== Government ==
=== Local government ===
Upper Deerfield Township is governed under the Township form of New Jersey municipal government, one of 141 municipalities (of the 564) statewide that use this form, the second-most commonly used form of government in the state. The governing body is comprised of the five-member Township Committee, whose members are elected at-large directly by the voters in partisan elections to serve three-year terms of office on a staggered basis, with either one or seats coming up for election each year as part of the November general election. At an annual reorganization meeting, the Township Committee selects one of its members to serve as Mayor and another as Deputy Mayor.

As of 2023, members of the Upper Deerfield Township Committee are Mayor James P. Crilley (R, term on committee and as mayor ends December 31, 2023), Deputy Mayor John L. Daddario (R, term on committee ends 2025; term as deputy mayor ends 2023), Scott R. Smith (R, 2024), Thomas R. Speranza (R, 2024) and Joseph L. Spoltore (R, 2025).

=== Federal, state and county representation ===
Upper Deerfield Township is located in the 2nd Congressional District and is part of New Jersey's 3rd state legislative district.

For the 119th United States Congress, New Jersey's 2nd congressional district is represented by Jeff Van Drew (R, Dennis Township). New Jersey is represented in the United States Senate by Democrats Cory Booker (Newark, term ends 2027) and Andy Kim (Moorestown, term ends 2031).

For the 2026–2027 session, the 3rd legislative district of the New Jersey Legislature is represented in the State Senate by John Burzichelli (D, Paulsboro) and in the General Assembly by David Bailey (D, Woodstown) and Heather Simmons (D, Glassboro).

Cumberland County is governed by a Board of County Commissioners composed of seven members who are elected at large by the citizens of Cumberland County in partisan elections and serve staggered three-year terms in office, with either two or three seats coming up for election each year in a three-year cycle. Annually, the seven board members select a Director and Deputy Director for one-year terms. As of 2025, members of the Cumberland County Board of County Commissioners (with party affiliation, residence and term-end year listed in parentheses) are:

Douglas A. Albrecht (R, Vineland, 2025), Deputy Director Antonio Romero (R, Vineland, 2027), Sandra Taylor (R, Downe Township; 2026), Victoria Groetsch-Lods (R, Vineland, 2025), Arthur Marchand (R, Hopewell Township, 2026), James Sauro (R, Vineland, 2026) and Robert A. Austino (D, Bridgeton, 2027).

The county's constitutional officers are: Clerk Celeste Riley (D, Bridgeton, 2029), Sheriff Michael Donato (R, Bridgeton, 2026) and Surrogate Rudolph Luisi (R, Vineland, 2028).

=== Politics ===
As of March 2011, there were a total of 5,179 registered voters in Upper Deerfield Township, of which 1,296 (25.0%) were registered as Democrats, 1,189 (23.0%) were registered as Republicans and 2,693 (52.0%) were registered as Unaffiliated. There was one voter registered to another party.

Gubernatorial election results for Upper Deerfield Township
Year	Republican		Democratic		Third party(ies)	
Year	No.	%	No.	%	No.	%
2025	1,653	57.58%	1,202	41.87%	16	0.56%
2021	1,545	67.67%	716	31.36%	22	0.96%
2017	1,030	53.04%	841	43.31%	71	3.66%
2013	1,397	65.99%	687	32.45%	33	1.56%
2009	1,213	50.86%	959	40.21%	213	8.93%
2005	1,081	49.09%	995	45.19%	126	5.72%

In the 2012 presidential election, Republican Mitt Romney received 52.7% of the vote (1,839 cast), ahead of Democrat Barack Obama with 46.2% (1,614 votes), and other candidates with 1.1% (37 votes), among the 3,513 ballots cast by the township's 5,361 registered voters (23 ballots were spoiled), for a turnout of 65.5%. In the 2008 presidential election, Republican John McCain received 51.2% of the vote (1,864 cast), ahead of Democrat Barack Obama, who received 46.5% (1,694 votes), with 3,640 ballots cast among the township's 5,150 registered voters, for a turnout of 70.7%. In the 2004 presidential election, Republican George W. Bush received 54.5% of the vote (1,842 ballots cast), outpolling Democrat John Kerry, who received around 43.2% (1,460 votes), with 3,377 ballots cast among the township's 4,734 registered voters, for a turnout percentage of 71.3.

United States presidential election results for Upper Deerfield Township 2024 2020 2016 2012 2008 2004
Year	Republican		Democratic		Third party(ies)	
Year	No.	%	No.	%	No.	%
2024	2,312	60.81%	1,432	37.66%	58	1.53%
2020	2,308	58.17%	1,607	40.50%	53	1.34%
2016	2,053	58.46%	1,336	38.04%	123	3.50%
2012	1,839	52.69%	1,614	46.25%	37	1.06%
2008	1,864	51.21%	1,694	46.54%	82	2.25%
2004	1,842	54.55%	1,460	43.23%	75	2.22%

In the 2013 gubernatorial election, Republican Chris Christie received 66.0% of the vote (1,397 cast), ahead of Democrat Barbara Buono with 32.5% (687 votes), and other candidates with 1.6% (33 votes), among the 2,147 ballots cast by the township's 5,158 registered voters (30 ballots were spoiled), for a turnout of 41.6%. In the 2009 gubernatorial election, Republican Chris Christie received 50.3% of the vote (1,213 ballots cast), ahead of both Democrat Jon Corzine with 39.8% (959 votes) and Independent Chris Daggett with 7.0% (169 votes), with 2,411 ballots cast among the township's 5,064 registered voters, yielding a 47.6% turnout.

United States Senate election results for Upper Deerfield Township1
Year	Republican		Democratic		Third party(ies)	
Year	No.	%	No.	%	No.	%
2024	2,087	56.96%	1,389	37.91%	188	5.13%
2018	1,673	61.92%	956	35.38%	73	2.70%
2012	1,556	47.77%	1,639	50.32%	62	1.90%
2006	1,182	52.98%	988	44.29%	61	2.73%

United States Senate election results for Upper Deerfield Township2
Year	Republican		Democratic		Third party(ies)	
Year	No.	%	No.	%	No.	%
2020	2,213	56.85%	1,572	40.38%	108	2.77%
2014	1,183	56.55%	858	41.01%	51	2.44%
2013	663	61.39%	403	37.31%	14	1.30%
2008	1,555	47.11%	1,671	50.62%	75	2.27%

== Education ==
The Upper Deerfield Township Schools serves public school students in pre-kindergarten through eighth grade.As of the 2023–24 school year, the district, comprised of three schools, had an enrollment of 979 students and 84.2 classroom teachers (on an FTE basis), for a student–teacher ratio of 11.6:1. Schools in the district (with 2023–24 enrollment data from the National Center for Education Statistics) are Charles F. Seabrook School with 432 students in grades PreK–3, Elizabeth E. Moore School with 274 students in grades 4–5 and Woodruff School with 263 students in grades 6–8.

Public school students in ninth through twelfth grades attend Cumberland Regional High School, which also serves students from Deerfield Township, Fairfield Township, Greenwich Township, Hopewell Township, Shiloh Borough and Stow Creek Township. As of the 2023–24 school year, the high school had an enrollment of 1,178 students and 83.5 classroom teachers (on an FTE basis), for a student–teacher ratio of 14.1:1. The high school district has a nine-member board of education, with board seats allocated to the constituent municipalities based on population; Upper Deerfield Township has two seats on the board.

Students are also eligible to attend Cumberland County Technical Education Center in Vineland, serving students from the entire county in its full-time technical training programs, which are offered without charge to students who are county residents.

== Transportation ==
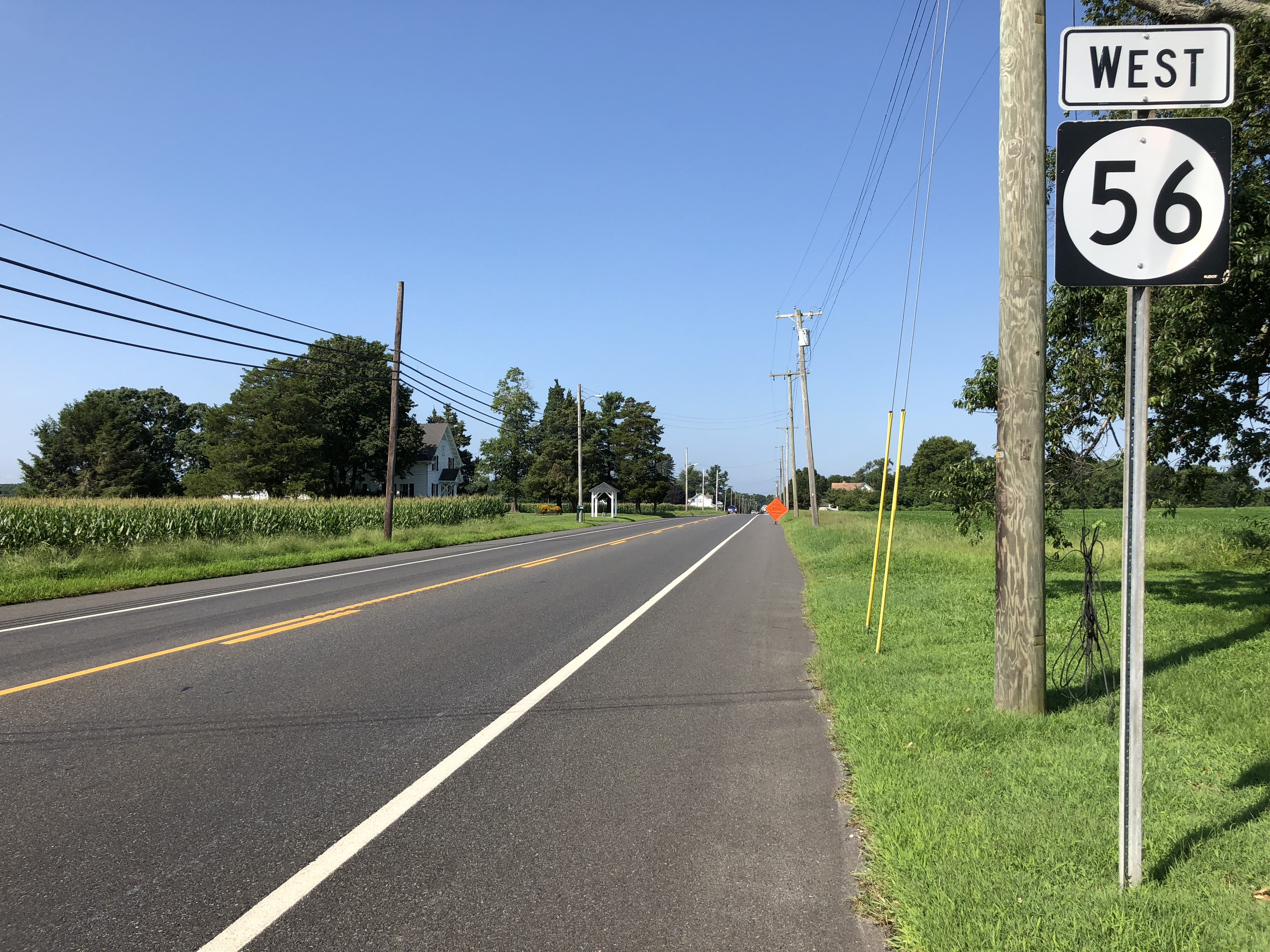
Route 56 (Landis Avenue) westbound in Upper Deerfield Township

=== Roads and highways ===
As of May 2010, the township had a total of 103.73 miles (166.94 km) of roadways, of which 29.56 miles (47.57 km) were maintained by the municipality, 64.38 miles (103.61 km) by Cumberland County and 9.79 miles (15.76 km) by the New Jersey Department of Transportation.

Route 77 enters from Bridgeton on the township's southern border and heads north through the center of the township for 7.6 miles (12.2 km) to Upper Pittsgrove Township at the northern tip of Upper Deerfield Township. Route 56 (Landis Avenue) branches off from Route 77 near the township's border with Bridgeton and heads northeast for 4.8 miles (7.7 km) towards Pittsgrove Township.

County Route 540 (Deerfield Road) traverses the northern quarter of the township for 4.6 miles (7.4 km) from Hopewell Township in the west towards Pittsgrove Township on the east. County Route 553 (South Woodruff Road / East Finley Road / Centerton Road) runs along the eastern side of the township for 6.6 miles (10.6 km) from Fairfield Township in the south towards Pittsgrove Township in the northeast corner. County Route 552 (Irving Avenue) follows the southern border of the township for 2.3 miles (3.7 km) from Bridgeton in the west towards Fairfield Township in the southeast corner of the township.

=== Public transportation ===
NJ Transit offers service on the 410 route between Bridgeton and Philadelphia, and the 553 route between Upper Deerfield Township and Atlantic City.

== Notable people ==
People who were born in, residents of, or otherwise closely associated with Upper Deerfield Township include:

- Charles F. Seabrook (1881–1964), business man and owner of Seabrook Farms, a family-owned frozen vegetable packing plant that at one point was the largest irrigated truck farm in the world, who was the namesake of Seabrook community and the Charles F. Seabrook School

== Points of interest ==
- Deerfield Pike Tollgate House – added to the National Register of Historic Places in 1975, it was demolished in 2001.
- Deerfield Presbyterian Church
