= Charles F. Seabrook =

American frozen vegetable magnate (1881–1964)

Charles Franklin Seabrook (28 May 1881 – 1964), known professionally as C. F. Seabrook, was an American businessman and owner of Seabrook Farms, a family-owned frozen vegetable packing plant in New Jersey that at one point was the largest irrigated truck farm in the world. Seabrook Farms became famous for recruiting Japanese Americans from internment camps beginning in January 1944 and other immigrants displaced from World War II. He was nicknamed the "Henry Ford of agriculture" by B.C. Forbes, the founder of Forbes magazine, and the town of Seabrook, New Jersey, is named after him.

== Early life ==
Seabrook was born in Cumberland County, New Jersey, to parents Arthur P. and Elizabeth (known as "Riley") Seabrook. His father was an Englishman who started an unnamed truck farm in 1870. In 1893, his father bought a 57-acre (23 ha) piece of land in Upper Deerfield to expand his farming business. C. F. Seabrook left school at the age of 12 to work as a farmhand for his father's farm in Upper Deerfield, Cumberland County. He is often described as a "reluctant farmer", who had interests in engineering instead.

== Career ==
During the early 1920s, he briefly worked overseas in Europe as an engineering consultant for civil projects.

=== Seabrook Farms ===
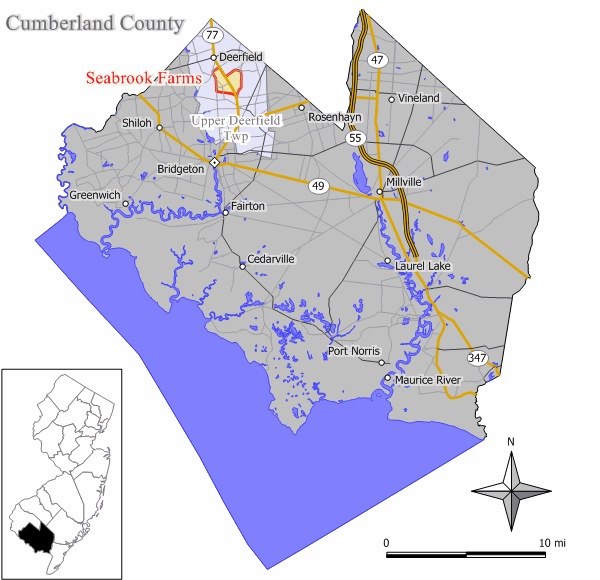
Seabrook Farms outlined in red

At the age of 14, Seabrook was an early proponent of novel irrigation methods in farming. He installed a single pipe with punched holes that fed water droplets over a celery bed in 1907 that increased production by approximately 300% and continued to be used until the mid-1930s. In the 1910s, C. F. bought his father's farm and had it incorporated in 1913.

The farm briefly was sold and renamed Del Bay Farms in 1919; however, Seabrook bought back ownership as well as a local cannery business. He was instrumental in the creation of highways that linked New Jersey to larger cities where his produce was sold, such as Philadelphia and New York City.

Seabrook expanded his father's business of growing and selling fresh vegetables by buying out surrounding plots of land. In the 1930s, he expanded the company to include the production of canned and frozen vegetables. His frozen food venture led to a partnership with Clarence Birdseye. By the 1940s, Seabrook was operating one of the largest farm and food businesses in the United States. At its height, it was producing agriculture on over 54,000 acres of land across three states and employing over 4,000 workers. The company also pioneered the use of gasoline-powered tractors and trucks.

Seabrook Farms became the supplier of frozen food for General Foods Corporation under their Birdseye brand, and under this name began supplying food for national and international markets. Seabrook had previously filled labor shortages with people of diverse backgrounds from the United States, including Italian immigrants and southern African Americans. During the Second World War, Seabrook worked with the War Relocation Authority to employ Japanese Americans released from internment camps. These laborers helped fill government orders of food to feed the troops overseas. After one year, over 1,000 Japanese Americans had relocated to south New Jersey to work for Seabrook. By 1947, Seabrook Farms employed over 2,500 Japanese Americans. Other employees included émigrés from Russia and German prisoners of war.

In 1955, LIFE magazine called Seabrook Farms the "Biggest Vegetable Factory on Earth".

Seabrook sold the company to Seeman Brothers in 1959. The company ceased operating under the name Seabrook Farms in 1963, when the name was changed to Seabrook Foods.

==== Bridgeton Strike ====
In early April 1934, over 300 workers for Seabrook Farms who had formed a union, most of whom were Italian and African Americans, began a peaceful strike for higher wages. Donald Henderson, a former professor at Columbia University, was the organizer of the strike. Seabrook agreed to double the wages after four days. However, after a few months he laid off over 100 workers, the majority of African-American descent, and again lowered wages. This reversal led to picketing and protests by some workers. Seabrook contacted police to end the strikes, which led to violent clashes on July 9. Eventually, these clashes made it to the front page of The New York Times. There was a photograph of the event taken, named Strikers at Seabrook Farms, Bridgeton, New Jersey (With a Stone in One Hand...), July 9, 1934, by an unknown photographer. The next day, a federal negotiator settled a deal with the strikers. Contrary to what was promised in the agreement, Seabrook Farms did not re-hire many of the workers who went on strike and many of its previous African-American workers remained unemployed afterwards.

== Personal life ==
Seabrook married Norma Dale Ivins on November 22, 1905. He and his wife had three sons: Belford, Charles Courtney, and John "Jack" Martin. Belford Seabrook was in charge of the engineering and construction of new Seabrook Farms plants. Charles Courtney Seabrook was born in 1909 and died in Woodstown, New Jersey while visiting a friend's house on October 4, 2003. He was in charge of sales. Jack earned a degree in chemical engineering at Princeton University and started working as a general manager at Seabrook Farms after graduation. Jack was nicknamed the "Spinach King" for his work at Seabrook Farms, and became the president of Seabrook Farms in 1954.

On 3 October 1941, Seabrook had a stroke. He continued to have health problems into the 1950s until his death in 1964.

== Honors and awards ==
The town of Seabrook, New Jersey, is named after him. The town has a Pre-K to 3rd grade elementary school named after him called the Charles F. Seabrook School. The town also has the Seabrook Educational and Cultural Center (SECC), a museum that houses historical information about the community that was created in Seabrook in 1994. The museum was founded by Japanese Americans whose families had moved to South Jersey to work in Seabrook Farms.

The Princeton Theological Seminary houses "The Charles F. Seabrook Manuscript Collection". It was established in 1996 from donations made by John Seabrook, one of Charles Seabrook's son. The seminary also created the C. F. Seabrook Director of Music and Lecturer in Church Music position in his honor.

The New Jersey Historical Commission also produced a radio documentary about Seabrook called Seabrook at War with writer Kurt Vonnegut as the narrator.

== Bibliography ==
- Seabrook, John (2025). The Spinach King: The Rise and Fall of an American Dynasty. W.W. Norton & Company. ISBN 978-1-324-00352-6.
- His son, John M. Seabrook wrote a biography about his father and Seabrook Farms, entitled Henry Ford of Agriculture: Charles F. Seabrook 1881–1964 and Seabrook Farms 1893–1959.
