= Seabrook, New Jersey =

School district in Cumberland County, New Jersey, US

- Unincorporated community
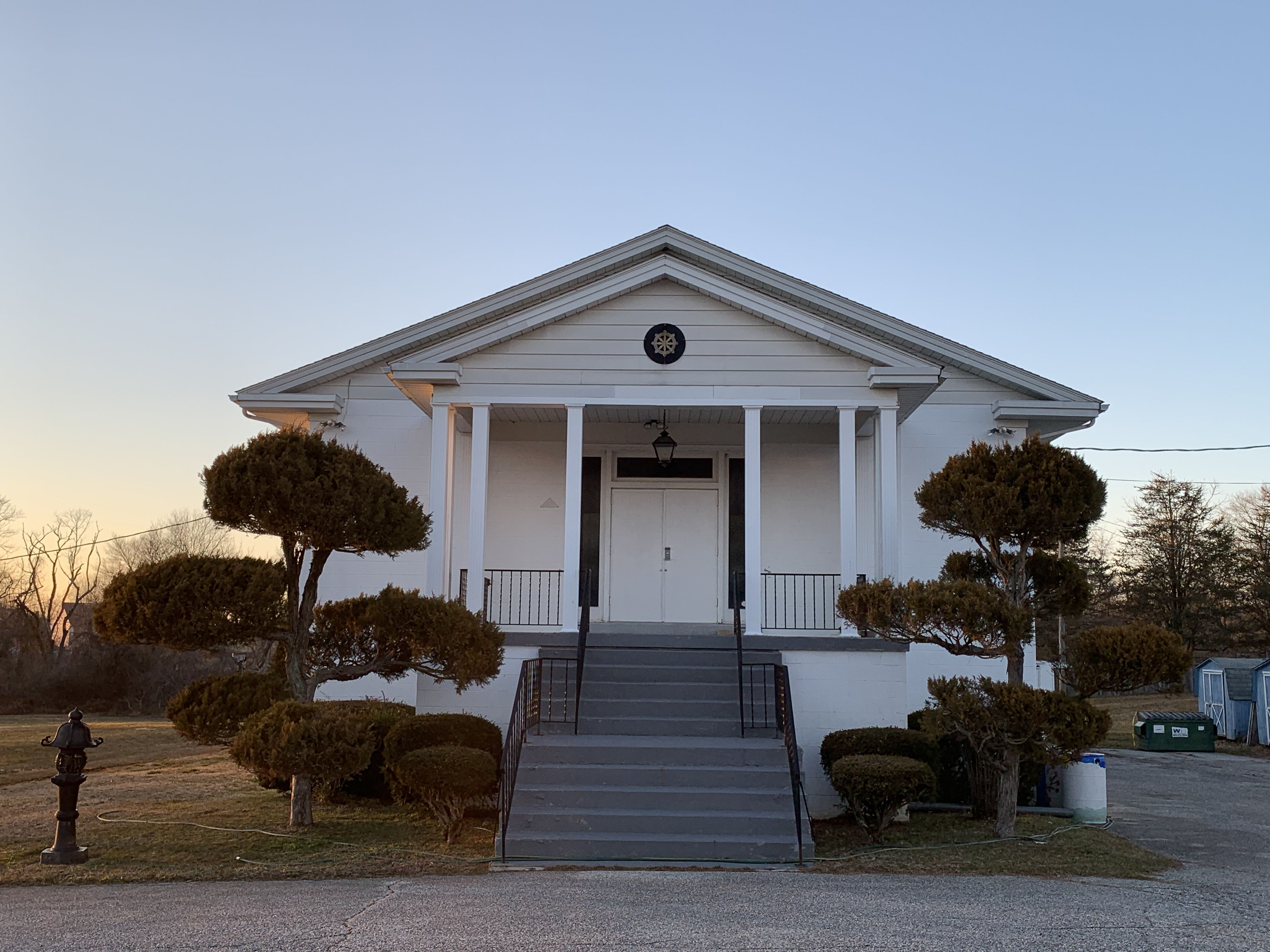
- Seabrook Buddhist Temple

- Location in Cumberland County Location in New Jersey Location in the United States
- Coordinates: 39°30′06″N 75°13′09″W
- Country: United States
- State: New Jersey
- County: Cumberland
- Township: Upper Deerfield
- Named for: Charles F. Seabrook
- Elevation: 108 ft (33 m)

Population (2010)
  - Total: 46,872
- Time zone: UTC-5 (Eastern (EST))
  - Summer (DST): UTC-4 (EDT)
- ZIP code: 08302
- GNIS feature ID: 0880448

Seabrook is an unincorporated community located within Upper Deerfield Township in Cumberland County, in the U.S. state of New Jersey. The area is served as United States Postal Service ZIP code 08302. The unincorporated community and the census-designated place Seabrook Farms within it are each named after Charles F. Seabrook, a businessman who at one point ran the largest irrigated truck farm in the world in this region.

As of the 2010 United States census, the population for ZIP Code Tabulation Area 08302 was 46,872. As of the 2000 United States census, the population was 44,450.

== Climate ==
The climate in this area is characterized by hot, humid summers and generally mild to cool winters. According to the Köppen Climate Classification system, Seabrook has a humid subtropical climate, abbreviated "Cfa" on climate maps.

== Seabrook Farms ==
Charles F. Seabrook and his three sons ran a frozen foods business in Seabrook. During World War II, they faced a labor shortage for their food processing plants. This led the company to recruit interned Japanese Americans starting in late 1943 and to bring in after the war. Within a year, nearly 1,000 workers had relocated to Seabrook from Japanese American internment camps, and the total number of Japanese Americans resettled there reached close to 3,000. Many transplanted families remained at Seabrook after the war where the company continued to grow and prosper.

Also recruited were Latin Americans of Japanese ancestry who had been rounded up and transported to American internment camps run by the U.S. Justice Department. These Latin American internees were eventually, through the efforts of civil rights attorney Wayne M. Collins, offered "parole" relocation to Seabrook. Many eventually became naturalized American citizens.

In October 1994, some area residents who used to work at Seabrook Farms opened a small museum called the Seabrook Educational and Cultural Center. The museum has two rooms with displays and video kiosks that tell the story of Seabrook Farms and the people who worked and lived there.
