= Upper Deerfield Township Schools =

School district in Cumberland County, New Jersey, US

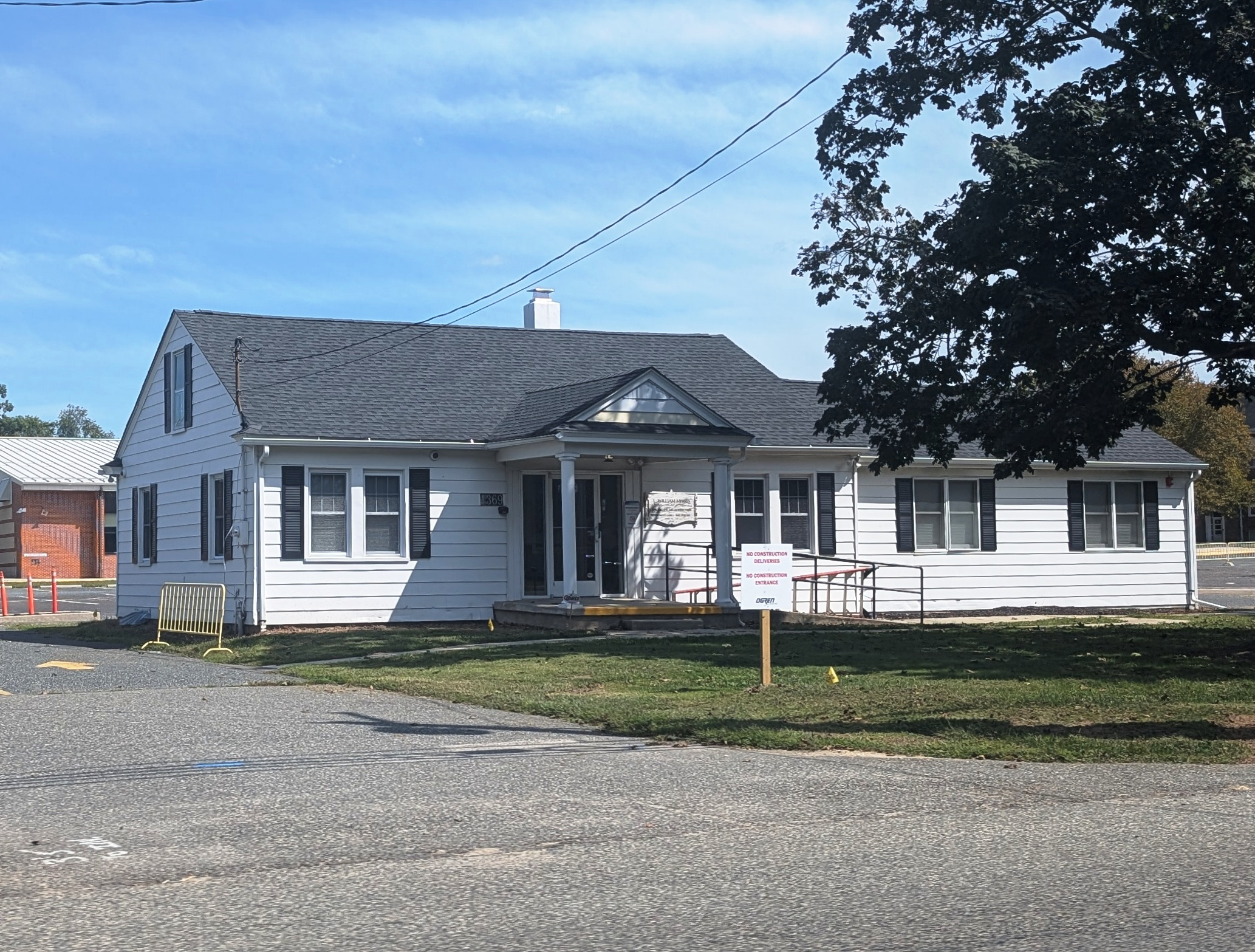
- Main district office

Address
- 1369 Route 77 Upper Deerfield Township, New Jersey, 08302; United States
- Coordinates: 39.502295°N 75.21922°W

District information
- Grades: PreK to 8
- Superintendent: Peter L. Koza
- Business administrator: Frank Badessa
- Schools: 3

Students and staff
- Enrollment: 979 (as of 2023–24)
- Faculty: 84.2 FTEs
- Student–teacher ratio: 11.6:1

Other information
- District Factor Group: B
- Website: www.udts.org
Ind.	Per pupil	District spending	Rank (*)	K-8 average	%± vs. average
1A	Total Spending	$17,617	49	$18,891	−6.7%
1	Budgetary Cost	13,639	37	14,159	−3.7%
2	Classroom Instruction	8,492	40	8,659	−1.9%
6	Support Services	1,592	15	2,167	−26.5%
8	Administrative Cost	1,786	71	1,547	15.4%
10	Operations & Maintenance	1,769	63	1,612	9.7%
16	Median Teacher Salary	60,730	40	61,136
Data from NJDoE 2014 Taxpayers' Guide to Education Spending. *Of K-8 districts with more than 750 students. Lowest spending=1; Highest=84

The Upper Deerfield Township Schools are a community public school district that serves students in pre-kindergarten through eighth grade from Upper Deerfield Township, in Cumberland County, in the U.S. state of New Jersey.

As of the 2023–24 school year, the district, comprised of three schools, had an enrollment of 979 students and 84.2 classroom teachers (on an FTE basis), for a student–teacher ratio of 11.6:1.

The district had been classified by the New Jersey Department of Education as being in District Factor Group "B", the second-lowest of eight groupings. District Factor Groups organize districts statewide to allow comparison by common socioeconomic characteristics of the local districts. From lowest socioeconomic status to highest, the categories are A, B, CD, DE, FG, GH, I and J.

Public school students in ninth through twelfth grades attend Cumberland Regional High School, which also serves students from Deerfield Township, Fairfield Township, Greenwich Township, Hopewell Township, Shiloh Borough and Stow Creek Township. As of the 2023–24 school year, the high school had an enrollment of 1,178 students and 83.5 classroom teachers (on an FTE basis), for a student–teacher ratio of 14.1:1. The high school district has a nine-member board of education, with board seats allocated to the constituent municipalities based on population; Upper Deerfield Township has two seats on the board.

== Schools ==
Schools in the district (with 2023–24 enrollment data from the National Center for Education Statistics) are:

Elementary schools

- Charles F. Seabrook School with 432 students in grades PreK–3
  - Lisa Frassetto, principal
- Elizabeth E. Moore School with 274 students in grades 4–5
  - Kimberly Rivera, principal
- Woodruff School with 263 students in grades 6–8
  - Harold Hill, principal

== Administration ==
Core members of the district's administration are:

- Peter L. Koza, superintendent
- Frank Badessa, business administrator and board secretary

== Board of education ==
The district's board of education is comprised of nine members who set policy and oversee the fiscal and educational operation of the district through its administration. As a Type II school district, the board's trustees are elected directly by voters to serve three-year terms of office on a staggered basis, with three seats up for election each year held (since 2012) as part of the November general election. The board appoints a superintendent to oversee the district's day-to-day operations and a business administrator to supervise the business functions of the district.

== Controversies ==
In 2023, parents started a petition calling for the resignation of superintendent Peter Koza, criticizing school leadership’s "slow and inadequate" response to a series of videos which showed a janitor at Elizabeth F. Moore School tampering with cafeteria food. One video showed the janitor rubbing bread meant to be served to students on his intimate parts, while another showed him putting bleach on cucumbers.
