= Cumberland Regional High School =

High school in Cumberland County, New Jersey, US

Address
- 90 Silver Lake Road Upper Deerfield Township, Cumberland County, New Jersey, 08302; United States
- Coordinates: 39.476663°N 75.220723°W

District information
- Grades: 9-12
- Superintendent: Carl Dolente
- Business administrator: Wayne Knight
- Schools: 1

Students and staff
- Enrollment: 1,215 (as of 2024–25)
- Faculty: 84.5 FTEs
- Student–teacher ratio: 14.4:1

Other information
- District Factor Group: B
- Website: www.crhsd.org
Ind.	Per pupil	District spending	Rank (*)	9-12 average	%± vs. average
1A	Total Spending	$20,464	24	$18,891	8.3%
1	Budgetary Cost	13,227	6	15,592	−15.2%
2	Classroom Instruction	7,330	4	8,807	−16.8%
6	Support Services	1,804	9	2,294	−21.4%
8	Administrative Cost	1,741	30	1,592	9.4%
10	Operations & Maintenance	1,771	16	1,954	−9.4%
13	Extracurricular Activities	567	7	873	−35.1%
16	Median Teacher Salary	61,474	9	71,726
Data from NJDoE 2014 Taxpayers' Guide to Education Spending. *Of 9-12 districts with any number of students. Lowest spending=1; Highest=47

Cumberland Regional High School

Information
- Type: Public high school
- Motto: "Scientiae Caritas"
- Established: 1977–78 school year
- NCES School ID: 340362001820
- Principal: Justin Martin
- Faculty: 84.5 FTEs
- Enrollment: 1,161 (as of 2024–25)
- Student to teacher ratio: 13.7:1
- Colors: Orange and brown
- Athletics conference: Tri-County Conference (general); West Jersey Football League (football)
- Team name: Colts

Cumberland Regional High School is a comprehensive regional public high school and school district, serving students in ninth through twelfth grades from seven communities in Cumberland County, New Jersey, United States. The district serves students from Deerfield Township, Fairfield Township, Greenwich Township, Hopewell Township, Shiloh Borough, Stow Creek Township and Upper Deerfield Township and encompasses 162 square miles (420 km^{2}). The school is located in the Seabrook section of Upper Deerfield Township.

As of the 2024–25 school year, the school had an enrollment of 1,161 students and 84.5 classroom teachers (on an FTE basis), for a student–teacher ratio of 13.7:1. There were 351 students (30.2% of enrollment) eligible for free lunch and 78 (6.7% of students) eligible for reduced-cost lunch.

The district participates in the Interdistrict Public School Choice Program, which allows non-resident students to attend the district's school without cost to their parents, with tuition covered by the State of New Jersey. Available slots are announced annually by grade.

== History ==
All seven constituent districts had sent their ninth through twelfth grade students to Bridgeton High School as part of sending/receiving relationships, until the school faced overcrowding issues in the 1970s. The initial school board was selected by the County Superintendent in December 1974, with the expectation that construction of a school could take as much as four years. By a margin of 11 votes, residents of the constituent communities approved a $10.2 million referendum to cover the cost of the new high school building.

Ground was broken on the school's Upper Deerfield Township site in May 1976. The school, constructed at a cost of $10 million (equivalent to $53.1 million in 2025) opened in September 1977 with an enrollment of 1,750 students. The first twelfth-grade class of 322 students graduated in June 1978.

The district had been classified by the New Jersey Department of Education as being in District Factor Group "B", the second lowest of eight groupings. District Factor Groups organize districts statewide to allow comparison by common socioeconomic characteristics of the local districts. From lowest socioeconomic status to highest, the categories are A, B, CD, DE, FG, GH, I and J.

== Awards, recognition and rankings ==
The school was the 274th-ranked public high school in New Jersey out of 339 schools statewide in New Jersey Monthly magazine's September 2014 cover story on the state's "Top Public High Schools", using a new ranking methodology. The school had been ranked 312th in the state of 328 schools in 2012, after being ranked 291st in 2010 out of 322 schools listed. The magazine ranked the school 279th in 2008 out of 316 schools. The school was ranked 282nd in the magazine's September 2006 issue, which surveyed 316 schools across the state.

== Extracurricular activities ==
Cumberland Regional High School offers students an extensive range of programs and activities, including the Future Business Leaders of America (FBLA), Future Farmers of America (FFA), the Student Council, Drama Guild, Team Theater, Indoor Ensemble, Concert Band, Choir, Mock trial, National Junior Classical League, Spanish Club, Leo Club, Interact Club, Key Club, CAST Club, Book Club, Sci-fi Club, Chess Club, Helping Hands Club, Rare Pearls Club, Young Men Can Make a Difference, Gay-Straight Alliance (GSA) and Yearbook Club.

== Athletics ==
The Cumberland Regional High School Colts compete as one of the member schools in the Tri-County Conference, which is comprised of public and private high schools located in Camden, Cape May, Cumberland, Gloucester and Salem counties. The conference is overseen by the New Jersey State Interscholastic Athletic Association (NJSIAA). With 813 students in grades 10-12, the school was classified by the NJSIAA for the 2019–20 school year as Group III for most athletic competition purposes, which included schools with an enrollment of 761 to 1,058 students in that grade range. The football team competes in the Royal Division of the 94-team West Jersey Football League superconference and was classified by the NJSIAA as Group IV South for football for 2024–2026, which included schools with 890 to 1,298 students.

The school participates in a joint wrestling team with Arthur P. Schalick High School as the host school / lead agency. The co-op program operates under agreements scheduled to expire at the end of the 2023–24 school year.

The field hockey team won the South Jersey Group IV state sectional title in 1985 and won in South Jersey Group III in 2000. The 2000 team finished the season with a 20-4 record after winning the Group III state championship by defeating runner-up Warren Hills Regional High School by a score of 1-0 in the tournament finals.

The 2001 softball team the Group III state title, defeating Morris Hills High School by a score of 4-0 in the final of the playoffs.

The boys tennis team won the 2001 South Jersey Group I championship, defeating Mainland Regional High School in the final by 4–1. The team won the 2005 tournament in Group III, edging Moorestown High School, 3–2 in the tournament final.

The boys soccer team won the 2002 South Jersey Group III sectional championship.

== Administration ==
Core members of the district's / school's administration are:

- Carl Dolente, superintendent and chief educational officer
- Wayne Knight, school business administrator and board secretary
- Justin Martin, principal. His core administration team includes three assistant principals.

== Board of education ==
The district's board of education, comprised of nine members, sets policy and oversees the fiscal and educational operation of the district through its administration. As a Type II school district, the board's trustees are elected directly by voters to serve three-year terms of office on a staggered basis, with three seats up for election each year held (since 2012) as part of the November general election. The board appoints a superintendent to oversee the district's day-to-day operations and a business administrator to supervise the business functions of the district. Board seats are allocated based on population, with each constituent municipality allocated at least one seat. Fairfield and Upper Deerfield townships have two seats, with the other five municipalities each assigned one seat on the board.

== Notable alumni ==
- Randy Byers (born 1964, class of 1982), outfielder who played for the San Diego Padres in 1987 and 1988
- Celeste Riley (born 1960, class of 1978), politician, who serves as the County Clerk of Cumberland County, after having served in the New Jersey General Assembly from 2009 to 2015, where she was the first woman to represent the 3rd Legislative District
- Jason Winrow (1971-2012), offensive guard who played in the NFL for the New York Giants
